= Economy of Mumbai =

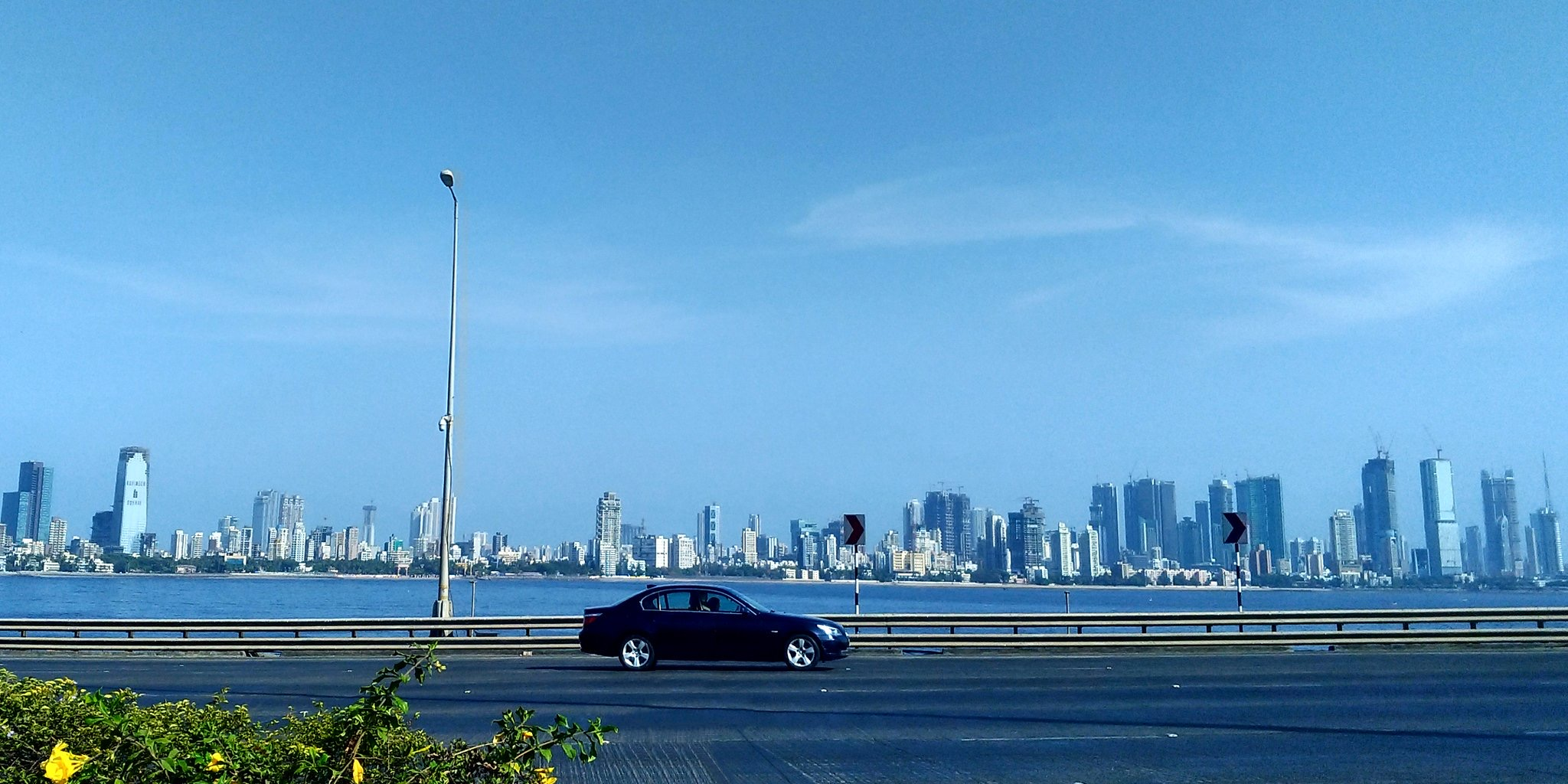
- The Skyline of Worli and Dadar as viewed from Bandra
- Currency: Indian rupee (INR, ₹)
- Fiscal year: 1 April – 31 March

Statistics
- Population: 23,748,395
- GDP: $277.98 billion (nominal GDP) (Metro) (2024-25) $400 billion (PPP Metro GDP) (2017-18)
- Main industries: Financial services Maritime trade Entertainment; Manufacturing
- All values, unless otherwise stated, are in US dollars.

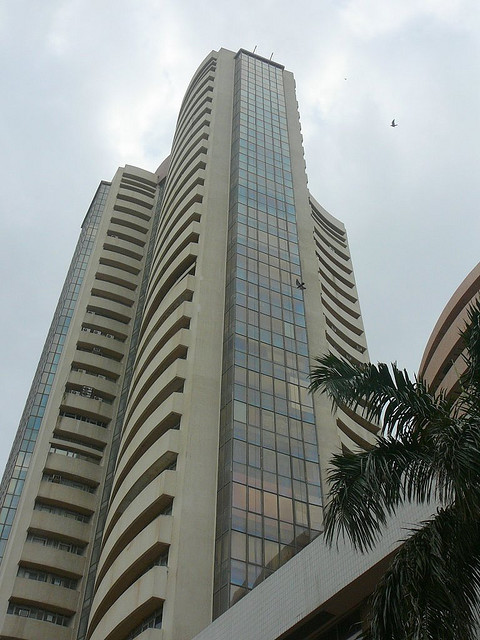
Bombay Stock Exchange

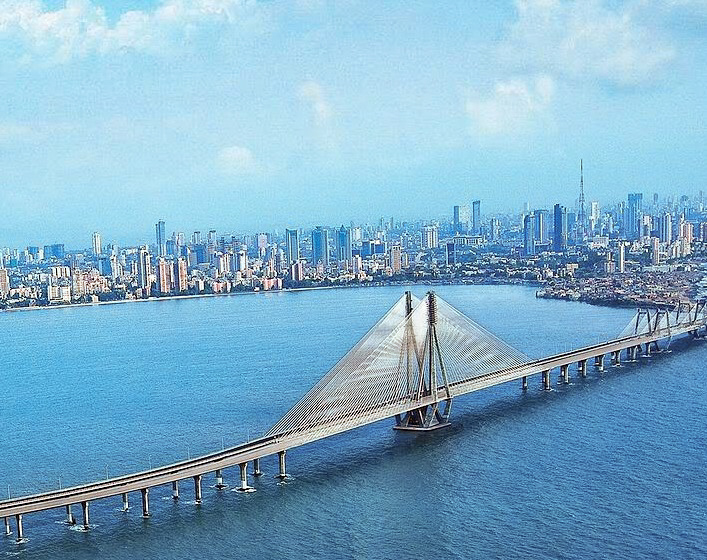
Bandra–Worli Sea Link

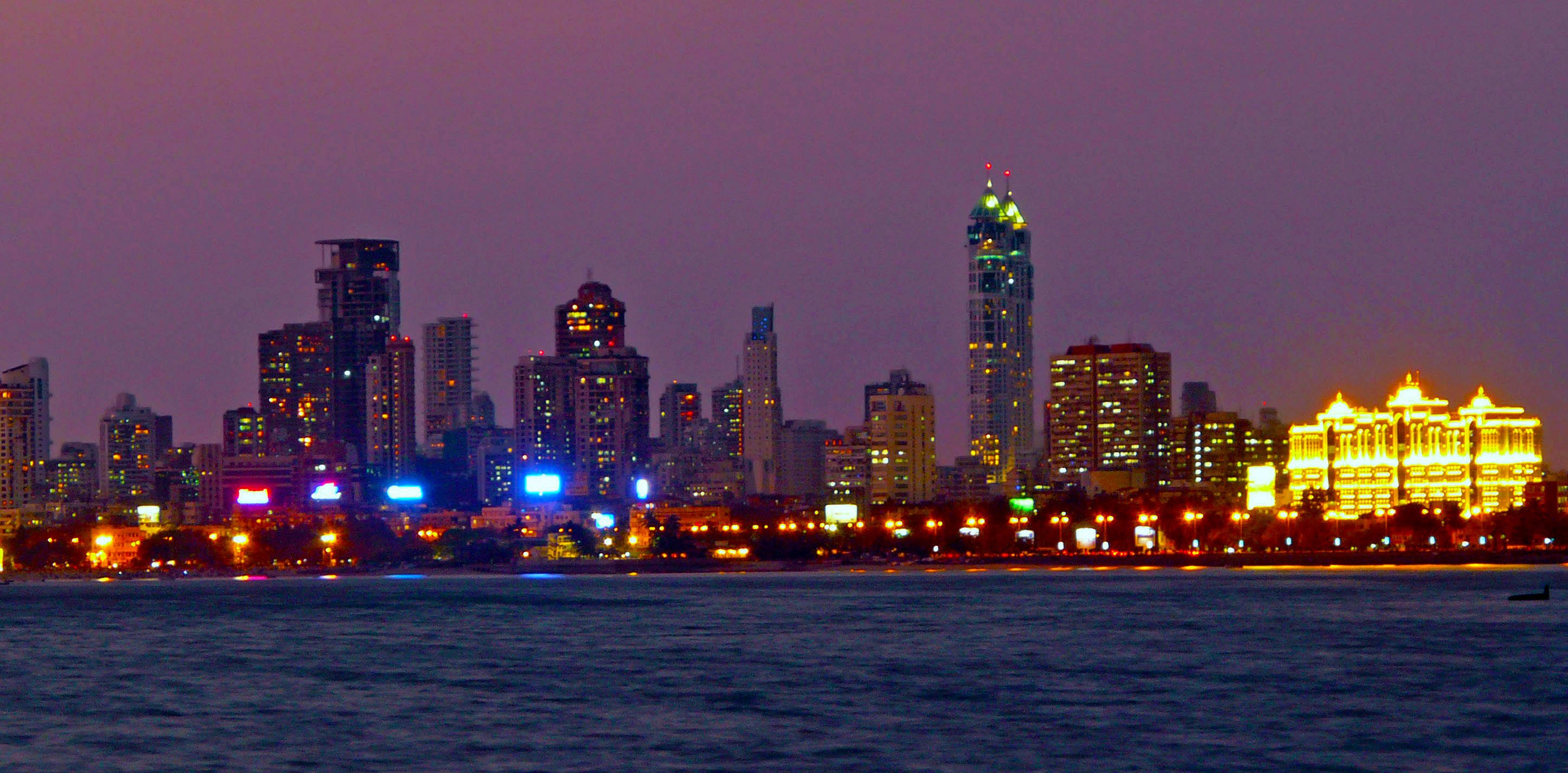
Skyline of South Mumbai, across Back Bay

Mumbai, often described as the "New York of India", is the country's most populous city, with an estimated city proper population of 12.5 million (1.25 crore) and the Mumbai Metropolitan Region is among the most populous Metropolitan regions in the world with a population of over 23 million (2.3 crore) , Mumbai is the financial centre and commercial capital of the country, generating 6.16 % of the total national GDP. The city is also the entertainment, cultural, fashion, and commercial centre of South Asia. Mumbai hosts the largest urban economy of any South Asian city, contributing the largest GDP share out of a US$4 trillion total Indian economy in nominal GDP terms. According to recent estimates, the Mumbai Metropolitan Region's nominal GDP is estimated to be US$277.98 billion, and its GDP (PPP) is estimated to be US$400 billion, Mumbai's GDP (PPP) per capita rounds up to around US$23,000. It is the richest Indian city and the 12th richest city in the world, with a net wealth of approximately US$1 trillion, with 46,000 millionaires and 92 billionaires. Mumbai accounts for 10% of Indian factory employment, 30% of Indian income tax collections, 45% of entertainment tax, 60% of customs duty collections, 20% of central excise tax collections, 40% of foreign trade, 100% of Indian stock market assets, and contributes 1,60,000 crore rupees (US$20 billion) in corporate taxes to the Indian economy.

The headquarters of several Indian financial institutions, such as the Bombay Stock Exchange, the Reserve Bank of India, the National Stock Exchange, the Mumbai Mint, as well as numerous Indian companies, such as the Tata Group, Essel Group, and Reliance Industries, are located in Mumbai. Most of these offices are located in downtown South Mumbai, which is the nerve centre of the Indian economy. Dalal Street, nicknamed the Wall Street of Mumbai, is home to the Bombay Stock Exchange and several financial institutions. Many foreign corporations also have their branch headquarters in the South Bombay area. Mumbai is also home to some of India's richest people, including Mukesh Ambani. Mumbai was ranked among the fastest cities in India for business startups in 2009.

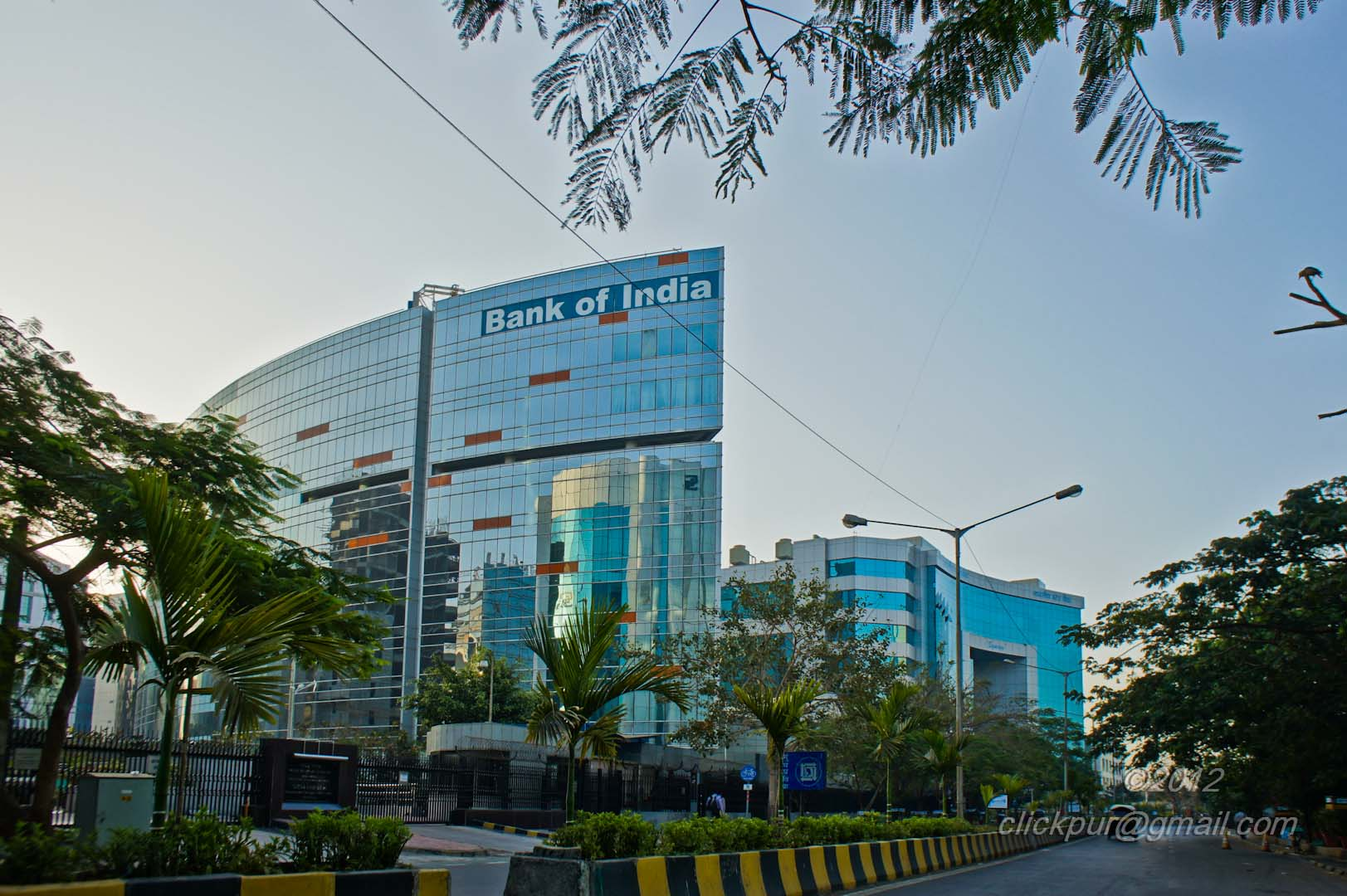
Bank of India at Bandra Kurla Complex

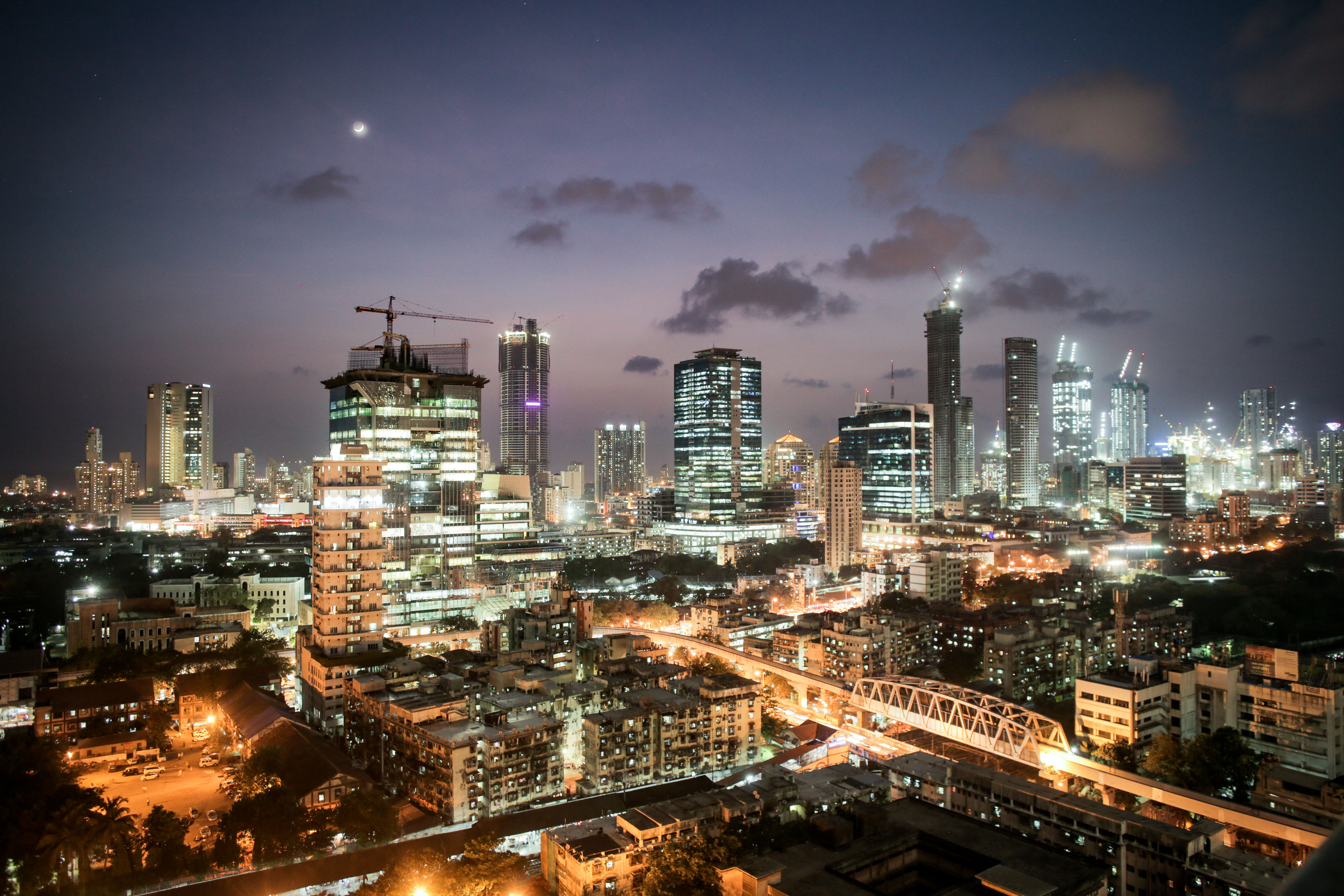
Mumbai is witnessing a massive skyscraper boom, with more than 250 currently under construction.

== Occupations ==
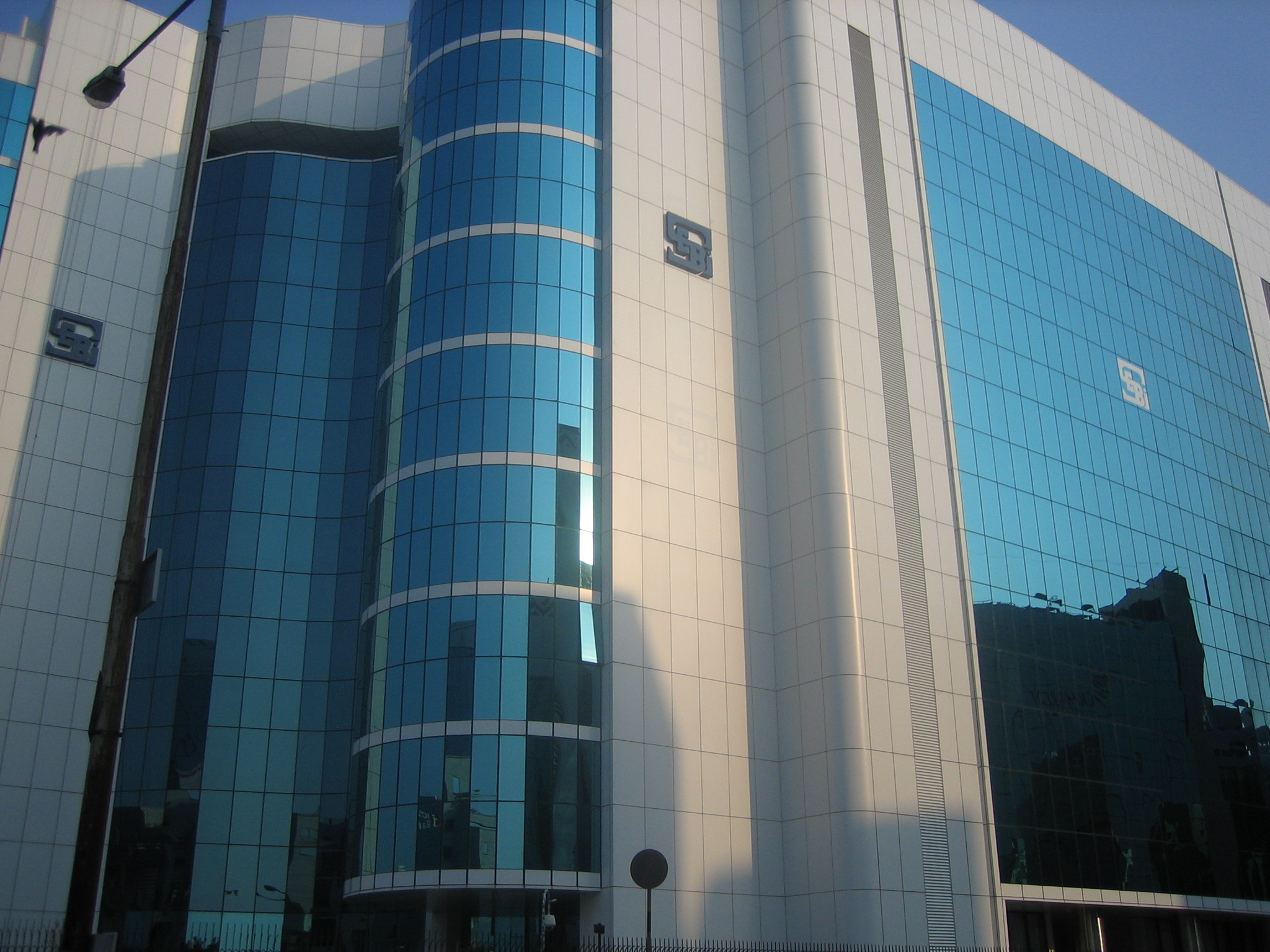
Securities and Exchange Board of India headquarters (SEBI)

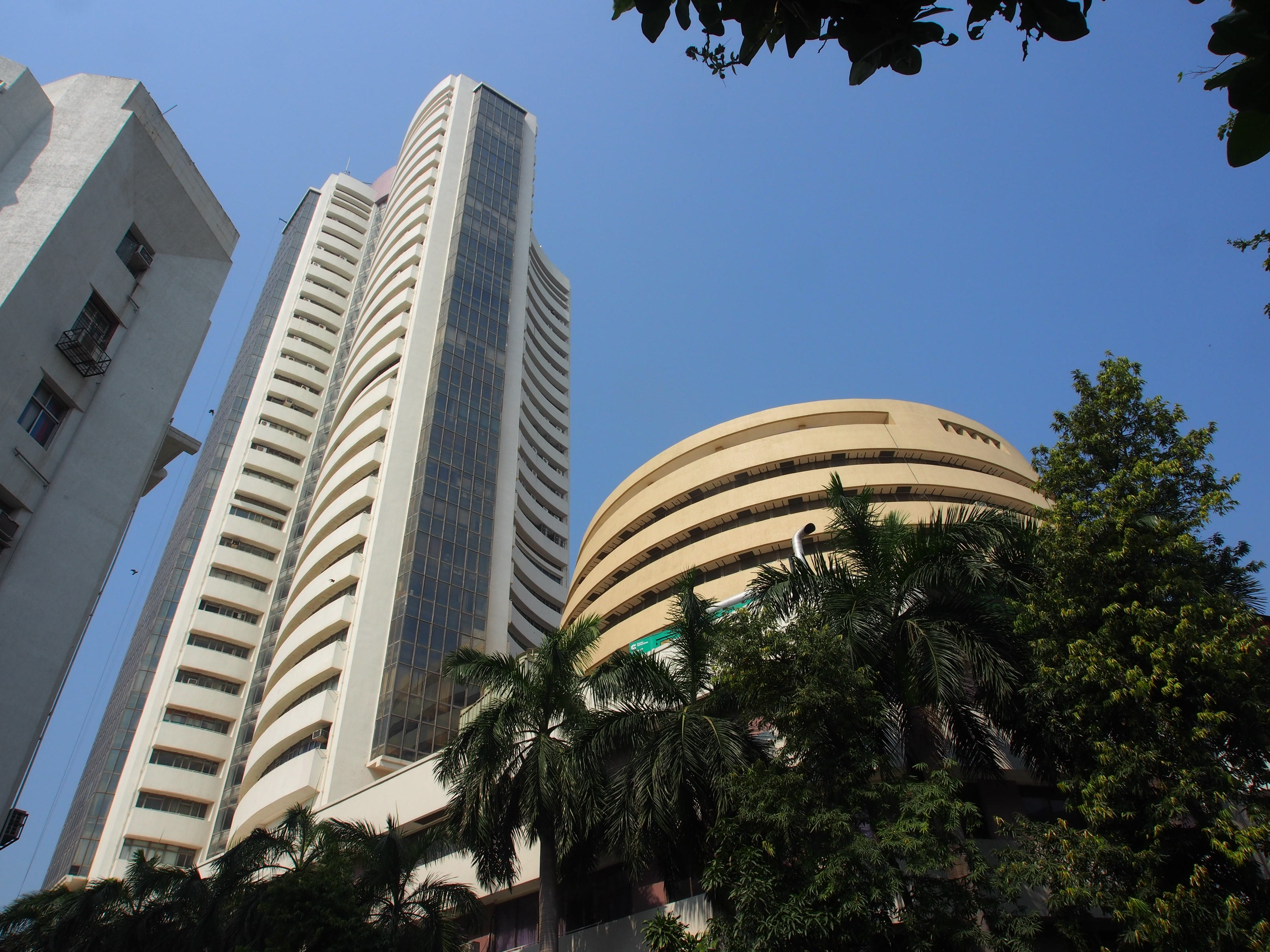
Bombay Stock Exchange building at Dalal Street

Mumbai has traditionally owed its prosperity largely to its textile mills and its seaport until the 1980s. These are now mostly replaced by industries employing more skilled labour, such as engineering, diamond polishing, healthcare, pharmaceutical marketing, and information technology. Mumbai is today India's primary financial centre, housing both major Indian stock exchanges (the Bombay Stock Exchange and the National Stock Exchange, which are the 9th and 10th largest stock exchanges in the world by market capitalization), brokerages, asset management companies (including the majority of Indian mutual funds), the headquarters of most Indian state-owned and commercial banks, as well as the financial and monetary regulatory authorities of India (the Securities and Exchange Board of India and the Reserve Bank of India), and many other institutions.

As Mumbai is the capital of Maharashtra, government employees make up a large percentage of the city's workforce. Mumbai also has a large semi-skilled labour population, who primarily earn their livelihood as hawkers, taxi drivers, mechanics and other such proletarian professions. The port of Mumbai and shipping industry too employs many residents directly and indirectly. Like most other metropolitan cities, Mumbai also has a large influx of people from rural areas looking for employment.

The entertainment industry is Mumbai's other major employer. Most of India's television and satellite networks are located in Mumbai, as well as the major publishing houses. A large number of the Hindi and English television shows are produced in Mumbai. The Hindi movie industry, also known as Bollywood, is also located in Mumbai, along with the largest studios and production houses.

== Industries ==
Wockhardt headquarters

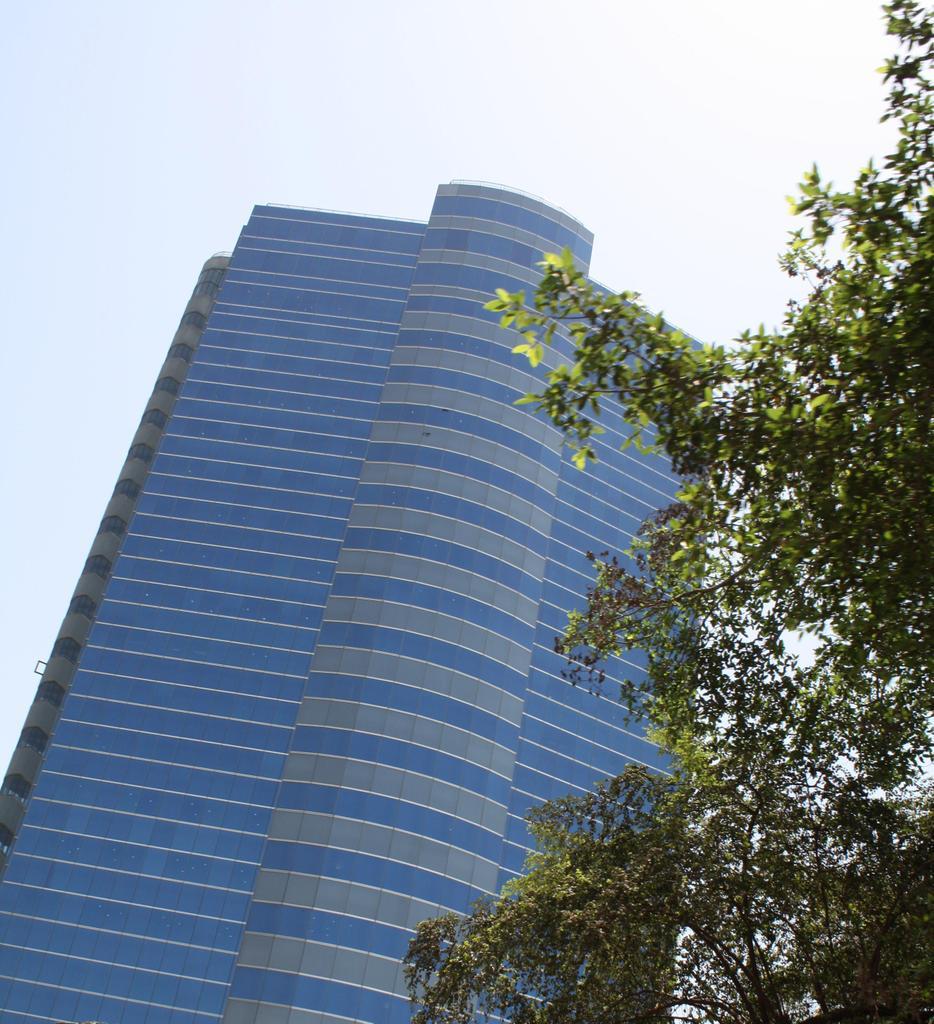
Essar Group headquarters

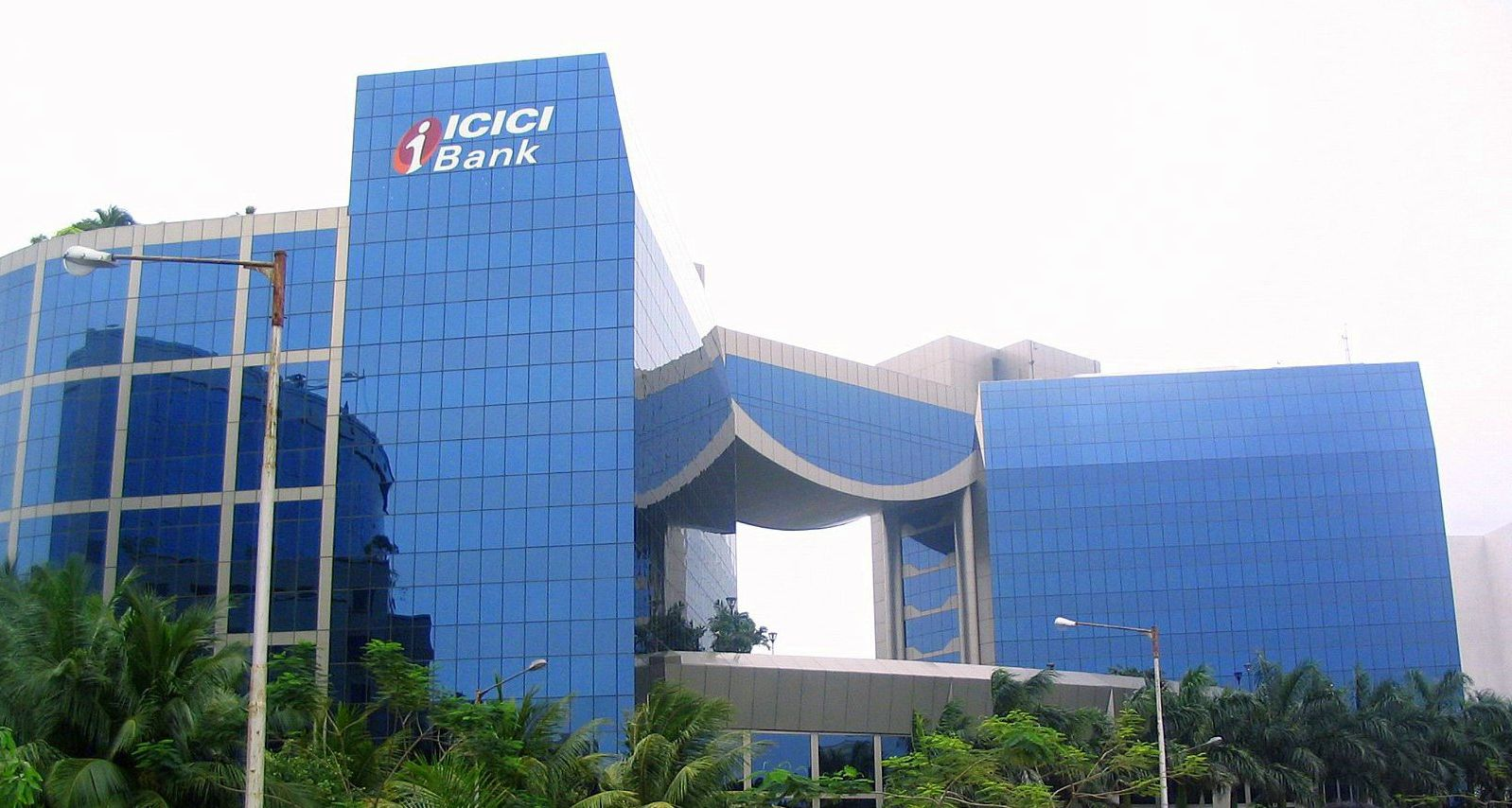
ICICI Bank at Bandra Kurla Complex

Mumbai is one of the top ten largest trading centres in the world in terms of global financial flows, generating ca. 6.16% of the Indian GDP and accounting for 25% of industrial production, 70% of Indian maritime trade and 70% of capital transactions to the Indian economy.

Several major Indian companies are headquartered in Mumbai. The three largest private companies in India, Tata Group, Reliance Industries, and Aditya Birla Group, are based in Mumbai. Below is a list of some of these major companies:

Company	Revenue (billion US$)
Tata Group	103
Reliance Industries	75
Aditya Birla Group	43.5
Hindustan Petroleum	34.44
Bharat Petroleum	39.45
State Bank of India	47.9
Reserve Bank of India	402.86
ICICI Bank	13.52
Larsen & Toubro	16.0
Reliance ADAG	15.4
Essar Group	39.0
HDFC Bank	12.48
Axis Bank	9.42
Bank of Baroda	5.51
Bank of India	5.44)
IDBI Bank	4.61
Union Bank of India	4.12
Hindalco Industries	14.0
Bajaj Group	6.69
Godrej Group	3.7
Mahindra Group	15.9
JSW Group	7
RPG Group	4.01

== Consumer goods industries ==
Mumbai is home to some of India's largest consumer packaged goods companies, such as Tata Consumer Products, Colgate-Palmolive, Godrej Consumer Products, and many much more.

== Transport ==
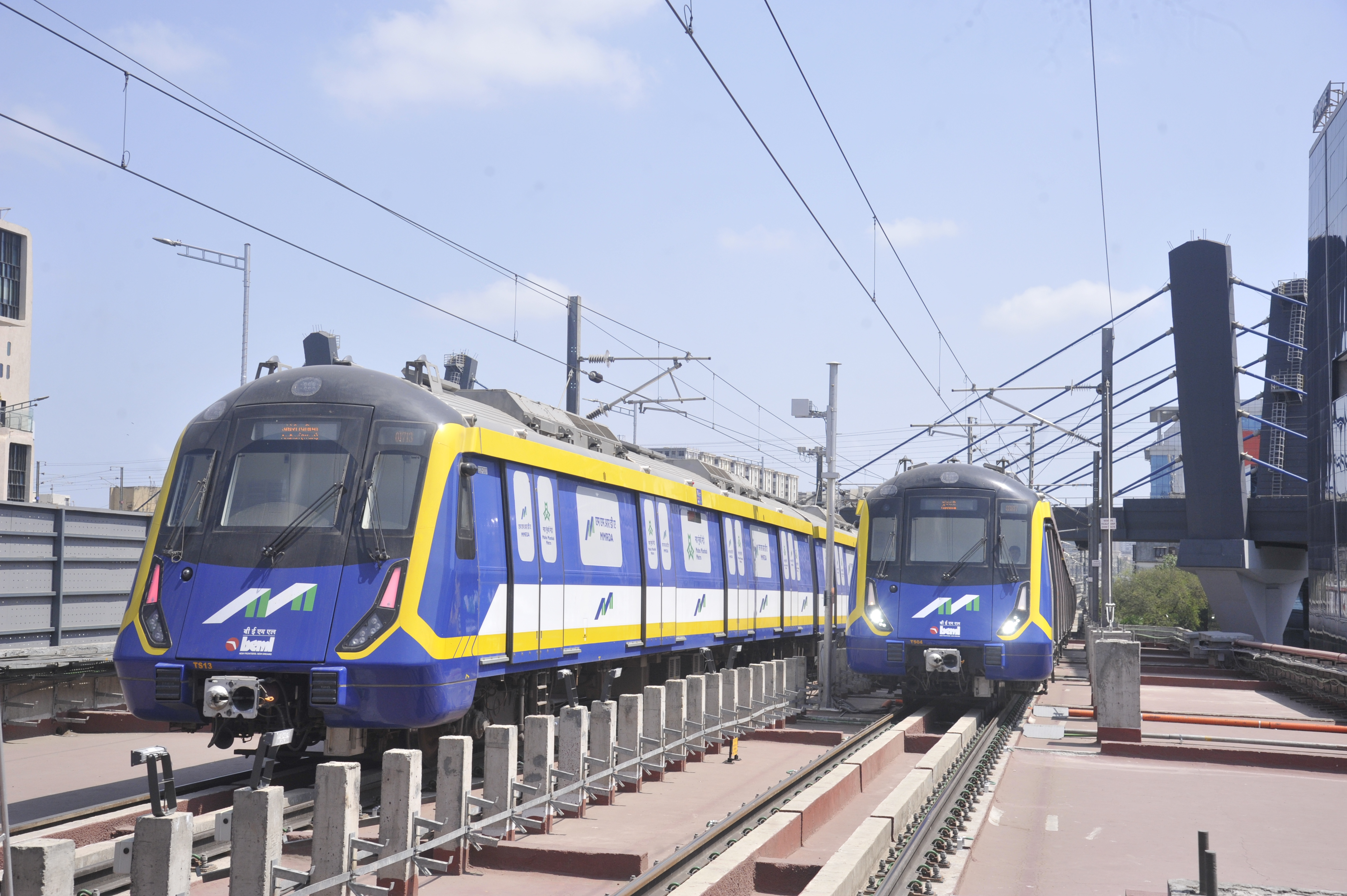
Mumbai Metro

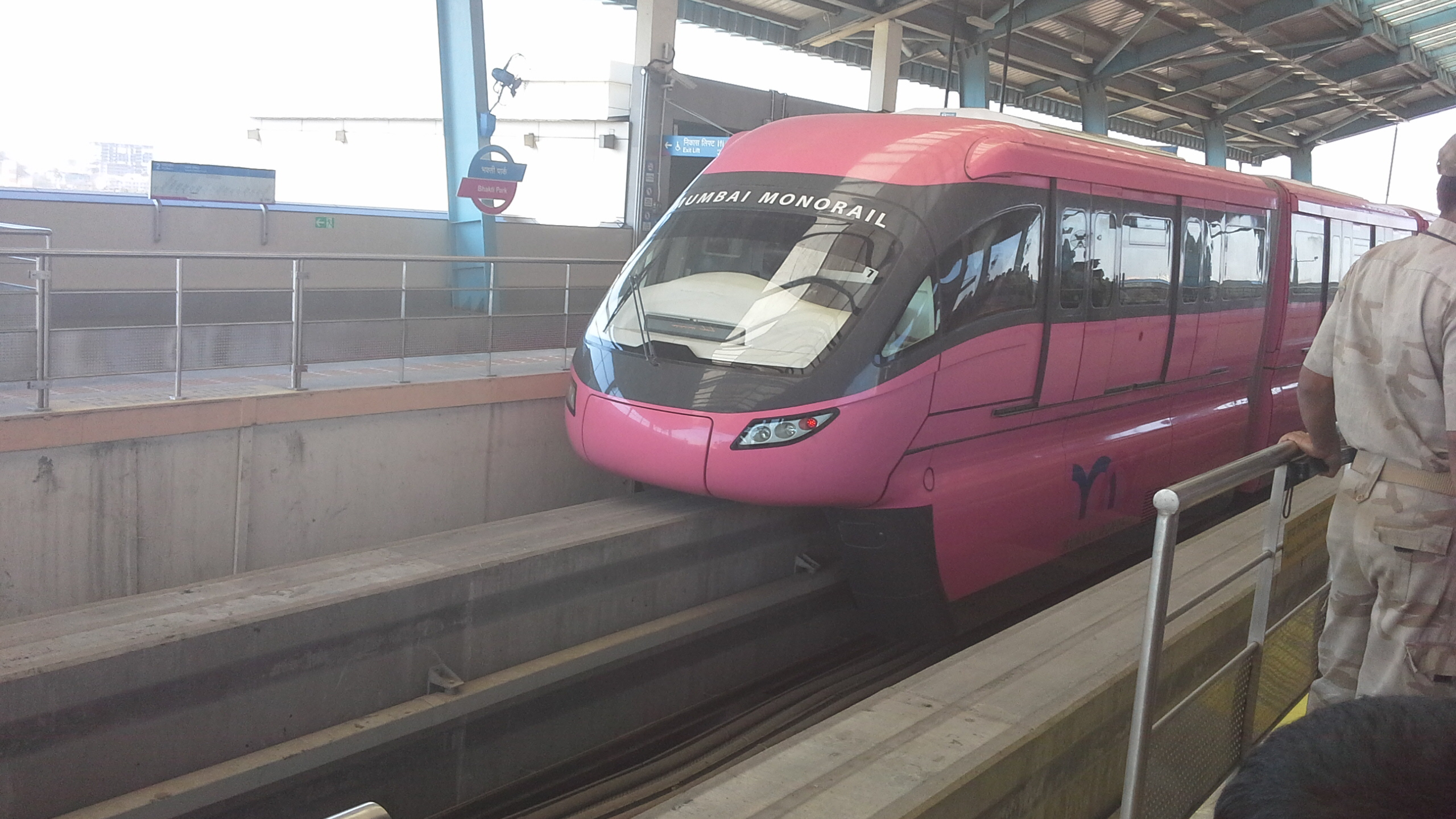
The Mumbai Monorail opened in February 2014 is the seventh largest monorail system in the world.

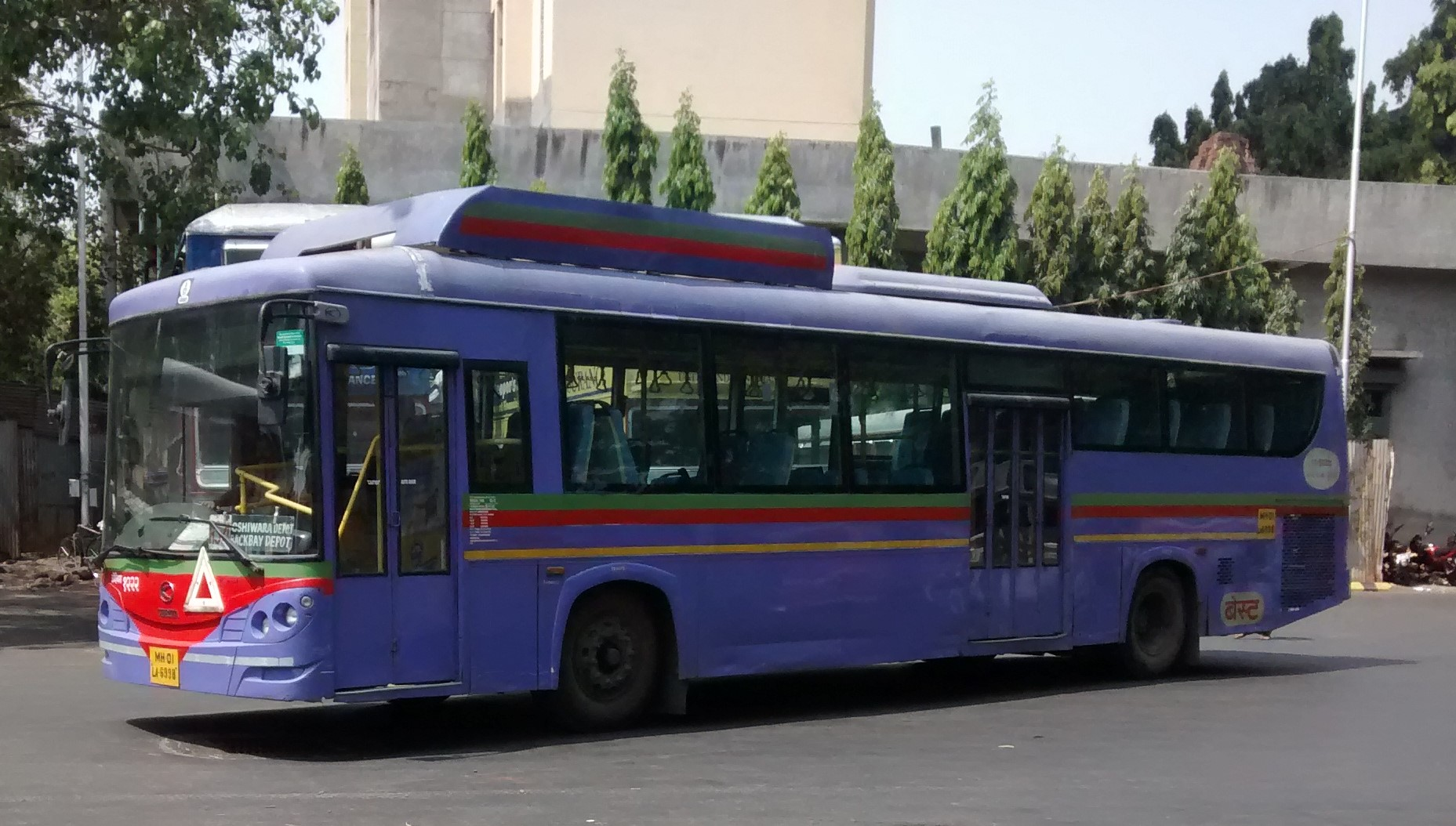
BEST buses carry a total of 2.8 million passengers daily.

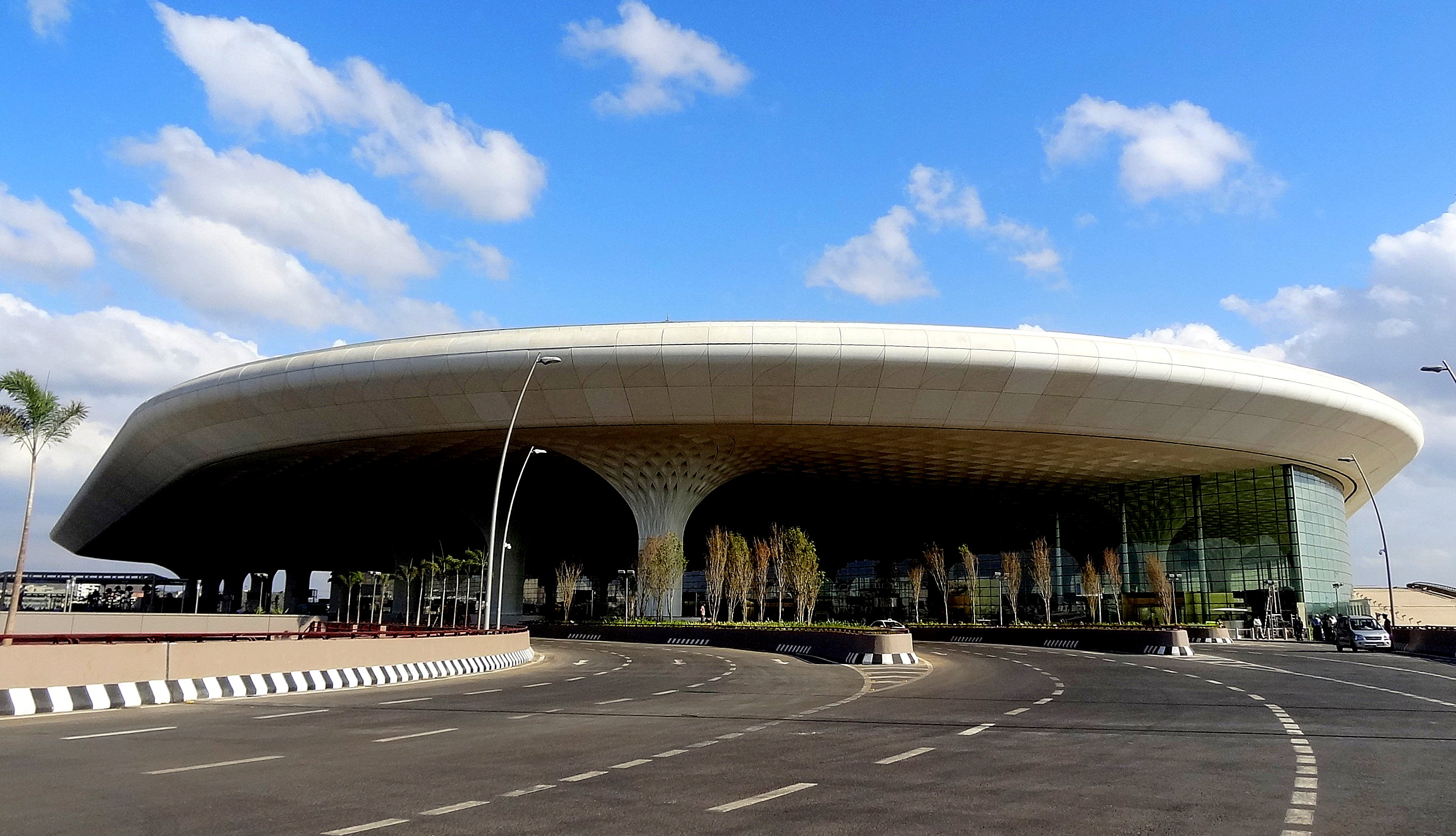
Chhatrapati Shivaji International Airport, Mumbai, India

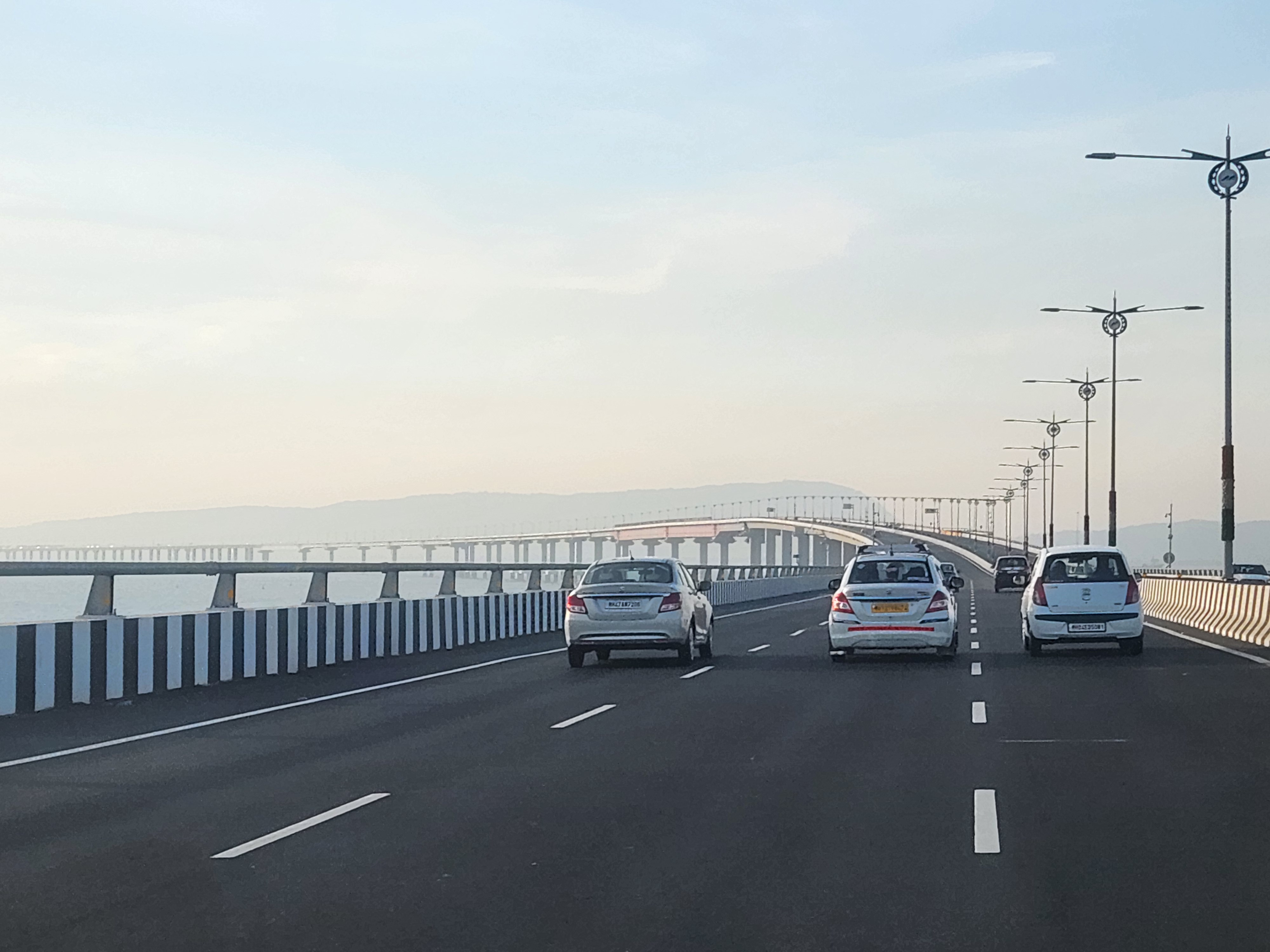
The Mumbai Trans Harbour Link is the longest sea bridge in India.

Another key contributor to Mumbai's economy is the transport sector. The city has been investing in and developing various transport related infrastructure projects. Mumbai Suburban Railway, popularly referred to as Locals forms the backbone of the city's transport system. It is operated by the Central Railway and Western Railway zones of the Indian Railways. Mumbai's suburban rail systems carried a total of 63 lakh (6.3 million) passengers every day in 2007. Trains are overcrowded during peak hours, with twelve-car trains of rated capacity 3550 passengers, actually carrying around 6,000+ passengers at peak hours. The Mumbai rail network is spread at an expanse of 319 route kilometres. 191 rakes (train-sets) of 12 car and 15 car composition are utilized to run a total of 2,750+ train services in the city.

The Mumbai Monorail and Mumbai Metro have been built and are being extended in phases to relieve overcrowding on the existing network. The Monorail opened in early February 2014. The first line of the Mumbai Metro opened in early June 2014.

Mumbai is the headquarters of two zones of the Indian Railways: the Central Railway (CR) headquartered at Chhatrapati Shivaji Terminus (formerly Victoria Terminus), and the Western Railway (WR) headquartered at Churchgate. Mumbai is also well connected to most parts of India by the Indian Railways. Long-distance trains originate from Chhatrapati Shivaji Terminus, Dadar, Lokmanya Tilak Terminus, Mumbai Central, Bandra Terminus, Andheri and Borivali.

=== Bus ===
Mumbai's bus services carried over 55 lakh (5.5 million) passengers per day in 2008, which dropped to 28 lakh (2.8 million) in 2015. Public buses run by BEST cover almost all parts of the metropolis, as well as parts of Navi Mumbai, Mira-Bhayandar and Thane. The BEST operates a total of 4,608 buses with CCTV cameras installed, ferrying 45 lakh (4.5 million) passengers daily over 390 routes. Its fleet consists of single-decker, double-decker, vestibule, low-floor, disabled-friendly, air-conditioned and Euro III compliant diesel and compressed natural gas powered buses. BEST introduced air-conditioned buses in 1998. BEST buses are red in colour, based originally on the Routemaster buses of London. Maharashtra State Road Transport Corporation (MSRTC, also known as ST) buses provide intercity transport connecting Mumbai with other towns and cities of Maharashtra and nearby states. The Navi Mumbai Municipal Transport (NMMT) and Thane Municipal Transport (TMT) also operate their buses in Mumbai, connecting various nodes of Navi Mumbai and Thane to parts of Mumbai.

Buses are generally favoured for commuting short to medium distances, while train fares are more economical for longer distance commutes.

The Mumbai Darshan is a tourist bus service which explores numerous tourist attractions in Mumbai. Bus Rapid Transit System lanes have been planned throughout Mumbai. Though 88% of the city's commuters travel by public transport, Mumbai still continues to struggle with traffic congestion. Mumbai's transport system has been categorised as one of the most congested in the world.

=== Road ===
Mumbai is served by National Highway 48, National Highway 66, National Highway 160 and National Highway 61. The Mumbai–Chennai and Mumbai–Delhi prongs of the Golden Quadrilateral system of National Highways start from the city. The Mumbai–Pune Expressway was the first expressway built in India. The Eastern Freeway was opened in 2013. The Mumbai–Nashik Expressway, Mumbai–Vadodara Expressway, are under construction. The Bandra–Worli Sea Link bridge, along with Mahim Causeway, links the island city to the western suburbs. The three major road arteries of the city are the Eastern Express Highway from Sion to Thane, the Sion Panvel Expressway from Sion to Panvel and the Western Express Highway from Bandra to Bhayandar. Mumbai has approximately 1,900 km (1,181 mi) of roads. There are five tolled entry points to the city by road.

Mumbai had about 721,000 private vehicles as of March 2014, 56,459 black and yellow taxis as of 2005, and 106,000 auto rickshaws, as of May 2013.

=== Air ===
The Chhatrapati Shivaji Maharaj International Airport (formerly Sahar International Airport) is the main aviation hub in the city and the second-busiest airport in India in terms of passenger traffic. It handled 5.52 crore (55.2 million) passengers in FY2024-2025 and 822,000 tonnes of cargo in FY 2023–2024. An upgrade plan was initiated in 2006, targeted at increasing the capacity of the airport to handle up to 4 crore (40 million) passengers annually and the new terminal T2 was opened in February 2014.

The Navi Mumbai International Airport, built in Panvel, will help relieve the increasing traffic burden on the existing airport once operations commence in December 2025. Initially, it will handle around 20 million passengers annually, and after total completion it will be able to handle 90 million passengers annually.

The Juhu Aerodrome was India's first airport, and now hosts the Bombay Flying Club and a heliport operated by state-owned Pawan Hans.

== Services ==
=== Tourism ===
The World Travel & Tourism Council calculated that tourism generated US$3.9 billion or 3.2% of the city's GDP in 2016 and supported 637,900 jobs, 7.3% of its total employment. The sector is predicted to grow at an average annual rate of 8.8% to US$9 billion by 2026 (3.1% of GDP). Mumbai's tourism industry accounted for 5.4% of India's total travel and tourism-related GDP in 2016, and employed 2.4% of the country's total workforce.

Foreign tourists accounted for 35.7% of all tourism-related spending in Mumbai in 2016. Nearly one-fifth of foreign tourists visiting the city come from the United Arab Emirates.

=== Other ===
Major industries located in Mumbai include:

- Hindi film industry
- Marathi film industry
- Automotive parts
- Utensils
- Biscuits (cookies)
- Clothing
- Textile mills
- Pencils
- Tractors
- Pharmaceuticals
- Import
- Export
- IT
- Health care

== See also ==
- Economy of Maharashtra
- Economy of India
- Economy of Bengaluru
- Economy of Hyderabad
- Economy of Delhi
