= BSE Tower =

BSE Tower may refer to:

- Phiroze Jeejeebhoy Towers, popularly known as BSE Towers which houses the Bombay Stock Exchange
- BSE Tower (Bucharest), which houses the Bucharest Stock Exchange
