= NSE co-location scam =

Indian stock exchange scam

The NSE co-location scam relates to the market manipulation at the National Stock Exchange of India, India's leading stock exchange. Allegedly select players obtained market price information ahead of the rest of the market, enabling them to front run the rest of the market, possibly breaching the NSE's purpose of demutualisation exchange governance and its robust transparency-based mechanism. The alleged connivance of insiders by rigging NSE's algo-trading and use of co-located servers ensured substantial profits to a set of brokers. This widespread market fraud came to light when markets' regulator, the Securities and Exchange Board of India (SEBI), received the first anonymous complaint through a whistle-blower's letter in January 2015. The whistle-blower alleged that trading members were able to capitalise on advance knowledge by colluding with some exchange officials. The overall default amount through NSE's high-frequency trading (HFT) is estimated to be ₹500 billion over five years.

The NSE co-location case is under investigation by the Central Bureau of Investigation (CBI), the Securities and Exchange Board of India (SEBI) and the Income Tax Department who are probing the involvement of NSE and SEBI officials, as well as NSE's former and current executives and brokerages.

In 2019, the Madras High Court issued a notice to SEBI, MCA, ED in response to a Public Interest Litigation (PIL) filed by the Chennai Financial Markets and Accountability (CFMA).

== Background ==
In January 2010, the NSE began offering a co-location facility to members. Members could place their servers in the Exchange's premises in return for a fee. This allowed them faster access to the buy and sell orders being disseminated by the exchange's trading engine. The term 'co-location' means 'a setup wherein the broker's computer is located in the same area as the stock exchange's server.' In addition, High-frequency trading (HFT) or algorithmic trading refers to the use of electronic systems, which can potentially execute thousands of orders on the stock exchange in less than a second. Also, retail investors monitoring prices are subject to a delay as compared to the tick-by-tick data broadcast a user receives in a co-location facility. Unusually, the SEBI did not put out a discussion paper to collect market feedback before permitting to proceed with the facility. There are no public records on HFT executed on the NSE. SEBI needs to consult with Technical Advisory Committee (TAC) for such market developments. However, no notification was received from SEBI in regard to it approving for all exchanges. During that time, the managing director of the NSE was Ravi Narain and C. B. Bhave was the chairman of SEBI. It is mentioned in passing in the NSE's 2009-10 annual report statement: "In keeping with global trends, the exchange has provided members a co-location facility for low latency high frequency trading. The Co-location data center is an international standard, state of the art, highly robust, resilient and secure infrastructure."

The whistle-blower's letter that was addressed to SEBI and copied to the leading financial magazine, Moneylife. clearly stated that:

when the co-location was started by NSE it took some time for the more enterprising to figure out what was happening in the system. By the end of the year, smart people had all figured out the way to game the system lay in being the first one to connect to the server and preferably the server, which was fastest.

The co-location case was initiated when certain members associated with HFT allegedly teamed up and worked in coalition for about four years, i.e. 2010- 2014 overriding rules and regulations set in place by SEBI, the market regulator. According to an unnamed individual familiar with SEBI's investigation: "Access to co-location facilities and HFT trading gave the select brokers differential advantage such as display of market data, viewing order book prior to order execution."

== Resignations at NSE ==
The Economic Times first reported that on 22 May 2017, SEBI issued show cause notices to the exchange and fourteen individuals, including former managing directors Chitra Ramakrishna and Ravi Narain. Notices have been sent to Ravi Narain, vice-chairman of NSE, who was chief executive officer (CEO) and managing director (MD) at the exchange during the period when the alleged violations took place. Other officials include Ravi Varanasi, who was the chief of NSE's business development vertical and was heading the surveillance department of the exchange during this period, and Suprabhat Lala, chief of regulation and head of the trading division during 2010–13. Among other officials who received show cause notices were former technology heads — Ravi Apte, and Umesh Jain, and former chief operating officer Subramanian Anand. NSE vice-chairman Ravi Narain had put in his papers on 2 June 2017, amid regulators intensifying their probe into the alleged lapses in high frequency trading. Chitra Ramakrishna, MD and CEO resigned from the exchange in December 2016. The media reported that Chitra's resignation the result of two governance-related issues at NSE. One was the loss of confidence in the NSE top management due to the colocation controversy. The second was the controversy surrounding a high-ranking official at NSE, Anand Subramanian, who was re-designated on 1 April 2015 as Group Operating Officer and Advisor to the MD. This appointment happened after communication from the NSE, MD and the CEO's office bypassing the Human Resources department. Complaints regarding this appointment, and Subramanian's high salary, reached the board prompting it to examine the appointment process. This led to Subramanian leaving the exchange in October 2016. Both Narain and Ramakrishna were part of the NSE's founding team, having joined the bourse in 1994.

After receiving show cause notices from SEBI, 12 out of 14 high-profile current and former top executives of NSE including Ravi Narain and Chitra Ramakrishna filed an application with SEBI to settle the co-location issue under consent mechanism in July 2017. The consent process is an alternative dispute resolution mechanism, allows an alleged wrongdoer to settle a pending issue by accepting a penal action without admitting or denying the guilt. During this period, in July 2017, Vikram Limaye took charge as MD and CEO of the NSE. He gave assurances that he would approach SEBI for a settlement of the co-location issue and would find the underlying cause of this issue. However, a consent application filed by the exchange was later returned in March 2018 after the CBI investigation gathered momentum.

== Role of Ajay Shah ==
Other unidentified officials of the NSE and stock market regulator SEBI are under suspicion as well to allow the illegal activity to continue for years. Ajay Shah played a key role in the exploitation of NSE TBT architecture. The probe agency has detected that Ajay Shah had allegedly collected NSE trade data in 2005-06 under the garb of doing research and passed the data to a company that prepared algos. The scam was exposed in 2015, when a whistleblower sent a letter to SEBI alleging that NSE provided preferential access to a few high-frequency traders and brokers to the exchange's trading platform. Consequently, the regulatory body initiated an investigation into the matter. SEBI found that Shah had officially entered into a data-sharing agreement with the NSE after 2012. Prior to this, he and his wife, Susan Thomas got the information from the exchange informally as researchers. Although Chitra Ramkrishna and other top NSE executives clearly denied that they shared data with Shah in his personal capacity, Shah told SEBI that he and his wife were signatories to a data-sharing agreement with the NSE. Also, prior to the contract, the data flow was to Ajay Shah and Susan Thomas. Ravi Apte, the Chief Technology Officer of NSE told SEBI that he had facilitated the transfer of data to Shah under the impression that an agreement was signed between Shah and NSE. Further, he stated that the data transfer was requested by Ravi Narain, former MD, and Ramkrishna.

SEBI's internal team has already concluded its investigation on the case and submitted its report. In July last year, SEBI issued show cause notices to NSE, some of the former and current senior NSE officials, brokers, services providers and Ajay Shah.

The role of Ajay Shah, Susan Thomas and the entire co-location scandal has been exposed in detail by journalist Palak Shah in his book ‘The Market Mafia’.

== The Brokers-NSE Nexus ==
The brokers-NSE nexus came to the forefront with the co-location scandal. The broker entity to receive maximum benefit in the scandal was OPG Securities, which was provided multiple login IPs and allowed access from the secondary servers. Due to favourable access, OPG Securities and other entities benefited instead of other brokers and their clients. Other firms on the list of 22 brokers who repeatedly logged in early on the NSE servers include: Alpha Grep, SMC Global, Barclays Securities, Kredent, Pace, Religare Securities, NYCE, Motilal Oswal, Kotak Securities, DE Shaw, Crimson, Advent, Mansukh Stock Brokers, JM Global, AB Financial, Indus Broking and Quant Broking. According to the forensic audit reports by EY India, Deloitte Touche Tohmatsu LLP & ISB, 62 brokerages have enjoyed preferential access though NSE's HFT platform and at present SEBI has only served the SCNs to 3 firms namely- OPG securities, its associate firm-GKN securities and Way2Wealth. The CBI investigation revealed that 90% of the time OPG securities, in collusion with unknown officials of the NSE, was first to access the NSE servers. SEBI's TAC report also revealed that OPG securities was given access using the co-location facility during 2010-2014 that enabled it to log in to the NSE server before any other entity and receive data before any other broker in the market. SEBI has alleged in its show-cause notice that the firm has earned close to ₹ 250 million in profit.

According to the whistle-blower, OPG Securities alone had trades worth over ₹60 billion on the NSE using co-location. In addition, the exchange's "order book" was exported to FIIs and FPIs, helping them make illegal gains in the stock market. While OPG Securities used the base technology, Omnesys Technologies provided the trading software. Whistle-blower Ken Fong's letter points to Bangalore-based, front-end technology provider Omnesys, a company that sold trading software to NSE's members and is said to have benefited, legitimately, from its ability to connect ahead of others to the exchange's servers. The whistle-blower states Omnesys was so sure of the early bird strategy that it had profit-sharing arrangements with clients. Omnesys gave the technology to NSE members on a profit-sharing basis and the NSE's wholly owned subsidiary secured 26 per cent stake in Omnesys at a huge discount. Chitra Ramakrishna, NSE's then-deputy managing director, was sitting on the board of Omnesys technologies according to documents from the registrar of companies. As the whistle-blower mentioned in his first letter dated, 14 January 2015, Omnesys was the market leader with its DMA product being highly popular on the institutional desk. This is important since the NSE was the second largest shareholder of Omnesys and worked closely with them for several years.

== Action by Agencies against perpetrators ==
=== SEBI Action ===
In November 2015, the whistle-blower's letter referred to SEBI's technical advisory committee (TAC) report that concluded in March 2016, that NSE systems were prone to 'manipulation' and thus recommended an investigation. This was when SEBI directed the new NSE board to conduct a forensic audit of its systems and deposit revenue from co-location trading in an escrow account. This was a blow to NSE's plans of going public as the co-location server facility stream accounted for nearly 35–40 per cent of the NSE's core revenues. The NSE added public interest directors to its board. They include: Ashok Chawla, former finance secretary; Naved Masood, former secretary in the Ministry of Corporate Affairs; TV Mohandas Pai, chairman of Manipal Global Education Services; Dinesh Kanabar, former deputy CEO of KPMG in India, and Dharmishta Raval, former SEBI executive director. The board then appointed Deloitte to conduct a forensic inquiry. The Deloitte report, submitted to SEBI on 23 December 2016, found that the exchange's tick-by-tick (TBT) system was prone to manipulation and restated the findings by the SEBI panel that some stock brokers obtained preferential access to servers. The NSE also admitted this in its draft prospectus. In a written reply, Minister of State for Finance, Arjun Meghwal told the Lok Sabha in 2016: "The architecture of NSE with respect to dissemination of tick-by-tick through transmission control protocol (TCP) or internet protocol (IP) was prone to manipulation or market abuse. And this system has been discontinued by NSE from 3 December 2016." SEBI's action was to nudge the NSE into conducting investigations by two big global consulting firms, Deloitte and Ernst & Young, despite the fact that both had a potential conflict of interest, having handled major projects or consulting assignments for the course. Ravi Narain, as MD and CEO of the NSE, was also the head of the sub-committee which chose Deloitte for the forensic audit of NSE, despite being fully aware that Deloitte was working on a large project for NSE's disaster recovery center (DRC). This was a clear case of conflict of interest. In July 2018, SEBI issued a second show-cause notice to the NSE, many of its former and existing executives, and senior officials alleged to have violated the SEBI Act, Securities Contracts (Regulation) Act, 1956, and Prohibition of Fraudulent and Unfair Trade Practices and broker regulations. The notice comes even as the CBI has booked brokers and unidentified officials at the NSE and SEBI for preferential access through the co-location service.

On 30 April 2019, SEBI passed its orders against the entities involved with the co-location scam. SEBI directed NSE to pay ₹6.25 billion with an interest rate of 12% worth over ₹10 billion and also barred the NSE from raising money on the securities market directly or indirectly for six months.

It also asked two former NSE chief executive officers, Ravi Narain and Chitra Ramakrishna, to disgorge 25% of their salaries drawn during a certain period. Narain and Ramakrishna have been also prohibited from associating with a listed company or a Market Infrastructure Institution or any other market intermediary for a period of five years.

SEBI also barred Ajay Shah, Infotech Financials’ two directors- Sunita Thomas and Krishna Dagli and Suprabhat Lala from being associated with any entities recognized by the markets regulator for a period of two years.

Similarly, OPG Securities Limited and its Directors was found to have made an unfair gain of ₹157 million which is to be disgorged with interest of 12% from 7 April 2014. The broking firm is barred from capital markets for a period of five years.

The Securities Appellate Tribunal (SAT) has given a four-week timeline to eight NSE officials including past CEO Chitra Ramakrishna, to file rejoinders in their pleas against SEBI penalising them in the co-location case. These officials have challenged the order at the SAT on 21 May.

On 16 January 2020, SEBI exonerated 9 former and current officials accused in the case. It said that based on the evidence available, it cannot be stated that these officials were involved in any wrongdoing.

On 10 February 2021 SEBI Imposes Rs1 Crore Penalty on NSE, Rs 25 Lakh Each on Ravi Narain, Chitra Ramakrishna.

On 1 February 2022, the dean of the SEBI-managed National Institute of Securities Markets (NISM), V R Narasimhan, is said to resign soon. Narasimhan is the former chief regulatory officer of the NSE, and his employment at NISM has sparked controversy as SEBI found him guilty of failures in duty while at the NSE and penalised him Rs. 6 lakh in a recent order involving Chitra Ramkrishna. On June 29, 2022, Chitra Ramkrishna was fined 5 crore by SEBI for her part in disregarding the unauthorised installation of black fibre connections to the exchange's co-location trading engines.

On 22 June 2022, OPG Securities MD Sanjay Gupta was arrested in NSE co-location case.

On 18 July 2022, the appointment of Ashishkumar Chauhan as the new Managing Director and CEO of the National Stock Market (NSE), the nation's main stock exchange, has been accepted by the Securities and Exchange Board of India (SEBI).

On 30 August 2022, former NSE CEO Chitra Ramkrishna's bail application in a money laundering case was denied. The Enforcement Directorate (ED) in Delhi has detained Ravi Narain, the former CEO of the National Stock Exchange (NSE), in a phone tapping case, on 30 August 2022.

On 28 September 2022, in the phone tapping case, the Delhi High Court granted statutory bail to former NSE CEO and MD Chitra Ramkrishna and Anand Subramanian.

On 1 November 2022, the ED argued against Chitra Ramkrishna's bail in the Delhi High Court, saying that she was the "mastermind" behind the criminal conspiracy involving the alleged illegal phone tapping of NSE employees and that the money laundering case was related to this.

=== Raid conducted by Income Tax department ===
In November 2017, the Income Tax Department (I-T) raided the premises of top former and serving officials of the NSE and its brokers. The I-T Department seized ₹110 million cash from the Delhi residence of Sanjay Gupta, promoter of OPG securities. Officials of the I-T also raided more than 50 OPG group premises in Mumbai, Delhi and Kolkata. Along with cash, some laptops, storage devices and confidential documents were also seized. I-T officials also disclosed that they have gathered reconstructed order books with cash being transmitted to tax havens (preferred by FIIs) like Cyprus, the British Virgin Islands, Mauritius, and Hong Kong — wherever OPG securities had access. The I-T raid was conducted two days after the NSE submitted reports from forensic auditors EY and the Indian School of Business (ISB) to SEBI. Surprisingly, in their reports, both EY and the ISB exonerated the exchange and its officials.

=== CBI action ===
On 28 May 2018, the Central Bureau of Investigation filed nine-page first information report (FIR) a year after the second whistle- blower, calling himself Jaime Jones, made serious allegations in a letter to the SEBI chairman. CBI booked the case against individuals for entering into criminal conspiracy, attempting to give and receive bribes, abuse of their official position, unfair access to TBT servers of the NSE for wrongful gain, manipulating the NSE server, and for destroying electronic evidence. CBI has also alleged that Sanjay Gupta and his brother-in-law, were illegally trading in Dubai, Ghana, Singapore, Hong Kong and China through his firm. After filing this case, CBI teams also conducted raids at multiple locations in Delhi, Mumbai and Bangalore. M. Damodaran, former SEBI chairman made a statement saying, "Having seen reports of the CBI registering a case in connection with NSE's co-location issue, I hope SEBI's dealing with the matter is proceeding at the desired pace. It is important for regulatory credibility that SEBI takes effective action immediately. Since an Exchange is a first-level regulator, it must measure up, and be seen as measuring up, to the highest levels of governance. Failing that, SEBI must take quick corrective action."

The CBI gave assurance to Delhi High Court that it will probe all the key accused pertaining to this scam regardless of their level in the hierarchy. CBI also said it would examine all the aspects mentioned in the petition and not limit itself to the FIR.

On 25 February, the CBI detained Anand Subramanian, the former group operating officer of the National Stock Exchange, after broadening its three-year investigation into the exchange's co-location scam in light of "new facts" revealed in a damning Sebi report, officials said on Friday. They claimed Subramanian was apprehended late Thursday night.

Officials say he was questioned for days in Chennai before the agency decided to arrest him. The Securities and Exchange Board of India (Sebi) has charged former NSE CEO Chitra Ramkrishna and others with alleged governance violations in Subramanian's appointment as chief strategy advisor and subsequent re-designation as group operating officer and MD advisor.

Ramkrishna has been fined Rs 3 crore by the Securities and Exchange Board of India (Sebi). Sebi levied penalties of Rs 11 crore on eight businesses, including the National Stock Exchange (NSE) and its previous chiefs Chitra Ramkrishna and Ravi Narain, in the case involving software related to algorithmic trading.

On 15 March 2022, Chitra Ramkrishna, the ex-MD of the NSE, has been placed in judicial detention till 28 March. The judge also stated that she is not a VIP and would not be given preferential treatment while in custody.

After inquiring at least three times about former Mumbai Police Commissioner Sanjay Pandey in connection with the National Stock Exchange (NSE) Co-Location scam, the Enforcement Directive (ED) arrested him on 18 July 2022 in connection with the suspected phone-tapping of NSE employees.

On 18 July 2022, the Delhi Court prolonged Chitra Ramakrishna's remand by four days in a money laundering case involving suspected phone tapping and spying of stock exchange staff.

The Central Bureau of Investigation (CBI) arrested former Mumbai Police Commissioner Sanjay Pandey on 24 September 2022, in connection with an alleged case of illegal phone tapping on NSE employees.

=== Madras High Court ===
The Madras High Court has issued the notices to the SEBI, the Ministry of Corporate Affairs (MCA), the CBI, the Enforcement Directorate (ED) and the NSE. This action was taken as HC has admitted a PIL filed by the Chennai Financial Markets and Accountability (CFMA). The court has given the time to respond to the notices till 11 November.

The petition stated that NSE violated the fundamental objective and gave illegal preferential access to certain trade members to access NSE trade data at the cost of the entire securities market and SEBI has not taken any effective actions to unearth the scam.

In August 2018, the Madras High Court issued notice to SEBI seeking appropriate action against NSE employees for the alleged fraud in co-location services and directed SEBI to file its response. After NSE launched its TBT in co-location, BSE sent a note to SEBI emphasising the need for a fair regulatory framework. However, SEBI ignored it.

== NSE vs. Moneylife Case ==
On 8 July 2015, Sucheta Dalal wrote an article on Moneylife's portal alleging that certain NSE officials were leaking sensitive data related to HFT or co-location to a select set of market participants so that could trade faster than their competitors. The article was based on an alleged complaint made to SEBI in January by an official of a Singapore-based hedge fund. The whistle-blower's first letter came from Singapore and was addressed to BK Gupta, deputy general manager of SEBI, and dated 14 January 2015. It was copied to Sucheta Dalal from Moneylife. The co-location scandal came to light when the NSE filed a defamation suit on 21 July 2015, claiming damages of ₹1 billion in the Bombay High Court against Moneylife, to stop the publication and circulation of the article. However, the court dismissed the case and asked the NSE to pay ₹150,000 each to journalists Debashis Basu and Sucheta Dalal. The court also imposed a penalty of ₹4.7 million on the NSE to be paid in the form of a donation to Masina Hospital and Tata Memorial Hospital in Mumbai. The court also ordered SEBI to investigate the charges levelled by the whistle-blower.
