= Business trust =

Business trust may refer to:

- Trust (business), an American English term for a large business with significant market power
- Massachusetts business trust
- Business Trust in India
