= Phiroze Jamshedji Jeejeebhoy =

Sir Phiroze Jamshedji Jeejeebhoy (1915–1980) was the Chairman of the Bombay Stock Exchange (BSE) from 1966, until his death in 1980. The Bombay Stock Exchange (BSE) is the largest of its kind in India, and one of the busiest in the world.

Jeejeebhoy was one of the longest-serving members of the BSE, and significantly impacted the course of its development. The building the BSE is currently housed in is located at Dalal Street in downtown Mumbai, and was initially called the BSE Towers. After Jeejeebhoy's death, the building was renamed in his memory as Phiroze Jeejeebhoy Towers.
