= Ashish Chauhan =

Indian business executive and administrator

Ashishkumar Chauhan
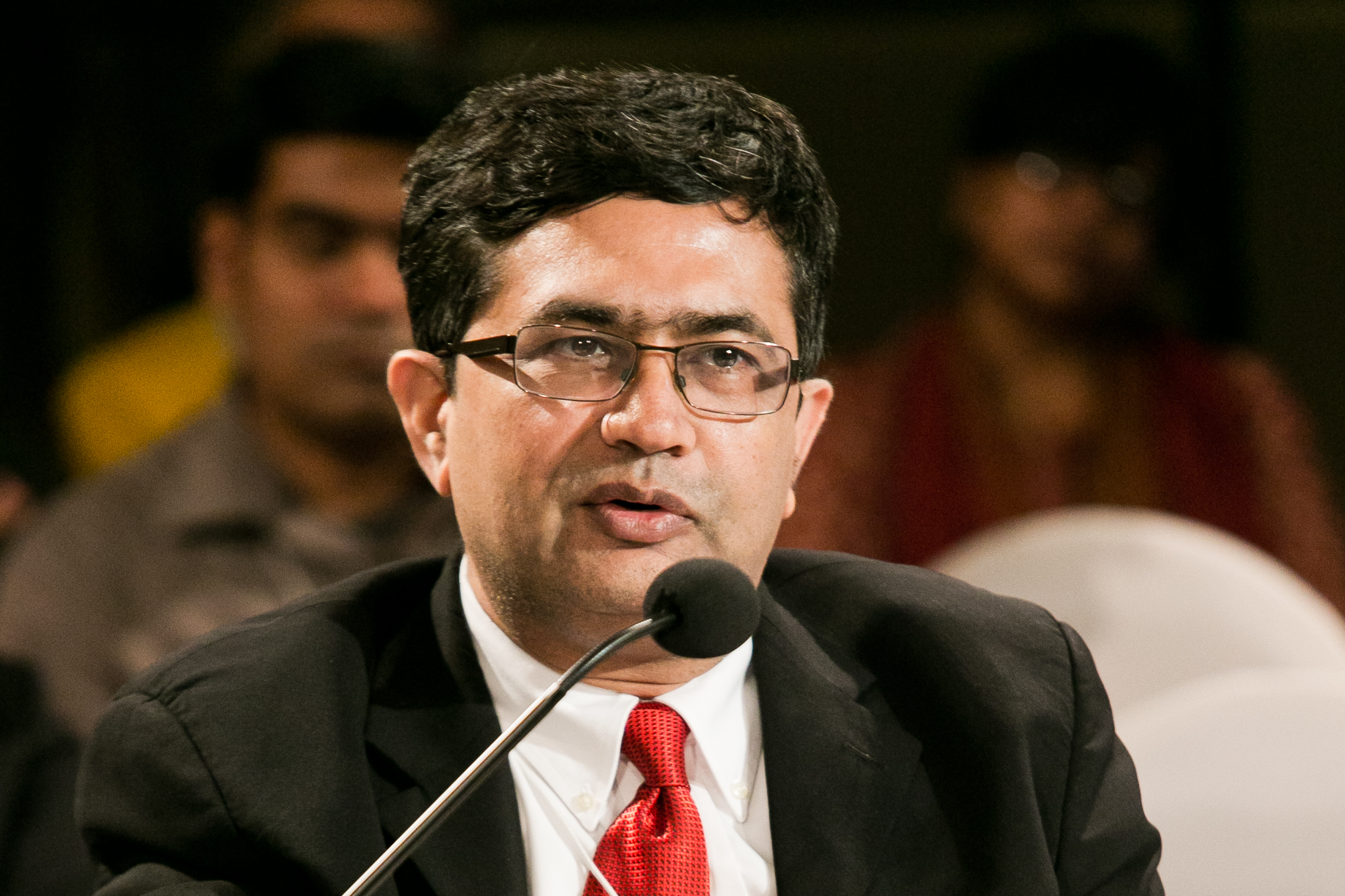
- Chauhan in 2012

MD & CEO of the National Stock Exchange of India
- Incumbent
- Assumed office 17 July 2022
- Preceded by: Vikram Limaye

Personal details
- Born: Ashishkumar Chauhan; 16 March 1968 (age 58) India
- Spouse: Sonal Chauhan
- Children: 1
- Education: IIT Bombay; IIM Calcutta

Ashishkumar Chauhan is an Indian business executive and administrator, who is currently the managing director (MD) and chief executive officer (CEO) of the National Stock Exchange (NSE).

A technocrat from IIT Bombay and IIM Calcutta, Chauhan was a founding member of NSE. Prior to joining NSE in 2022, he was the MD and CEO of the Bombay Stock Exchange (BSE) for 10 years. Chauhan is a member of the University Grants Commission and is the Chancellor of University of Allahabad. He also serves as a member of Governing Council of IIM Calcutta.

== Early life ==
A mechanical engineer from IIT Bombay and alumnus of IIM Calcutta, Chauhan was recruited from the campus as an officer by the Industrial Development Bank of India (IDBI) in 1991.

== Career ==
Chauhan's first break came in 1993, when the Government proposed a stock exchange in the National Stock Exchange (NSE). Chauhan was a member of the core team that founded the NSE, and responsible for setting up their equities and derivatives markets from 1993 to 2000. In addition, he was instrumental in setting up initial information technology infrastructure, including the first commercial satellite telecom network in India for NSE. He was also involved in conceptualization of National Securities Clearing Corporation (NSCCL) and initial set up of National Securities Depository Limited (NSDL).

In 2001, Chauhan left NSE to begin his entrepreneurship venture, financed by the Reliance Group, and soon began working for Reliance Infocomm. In 2004, Chauhan became the chief information officer (CIO) of Reliance Infocomm, and then the Reliance Group CIO in 2005. He was also the CEO of the cricket team Mumbai Indians, owned by Reliance Industries, in its formative years.

After leaving Reliance Industries, Chauhan joined BSE as Deputy CEO in 2009 and was appointed as CEO in 2012. In 2013, he pushed BSE to develop a mutual fund distribution platform called BSE StAR MF. He was also instrumental in setting up India International Exchange, which was inaugurated by the Prime Minister of India Narendra Modi in January 2017 at Gandhinagar, GIFT City.

Chauhan re-joined NSE in 2022 as MD and CEO.

== Leadership roles ==
Beyond corporate roles, Chauhan has contributed to public policy and higher education. He serves as a member of the University Grants Commission, Chancellor of the University of Allahabad, a member of the Governing Board of the Indian Institute of Management Calcutta, Board of Direction of the World Federation of Exchanges and a board member of the Data Security Council of India. He chaired the committee that recommended the conversion of the National Institute of Industrial Engineering (NITIE) into the Indian Institute of Management Mumbai.

He is a member of the Board of Advisors at the Shailesh J. Mehta School of Management, IIT Bombay. He also served as Director of the Gokhale Institute of Politics and Economics, Pune.

== Biography ==
A book titled Sthithapragya: The Process of Maintaining an Equilibrium addresses his life's journey.
