= Muhurat trading =

Indian stock market trading on Diwali

Muhurat trading is the trading activity in the Indian stock market on the occasion of Diwali (Deepawali), a big festival for citizens of India. Usually, it is held during evening hour and is announced by the stock market exchanges notifying traders and investors of the non-scheduled trading hour. (dominant sect of people in Dalal Street) who do similar trading on hours of Diwali.

== Trading activity ==
Stock brokers' offices are decorated with rangoli patterns and diyas to welcome Goddess Lakshmi. Muhurat trading is a link the trading community retains with its past. The practice of Muhurat trading has been retained and observed for ages. The schedule of the muhurat trading is announced by the stock exchange and the Sensex closes on a higher note at the ending of the trading hour. With this, the traders on Dalal Street welcome the New Year. Many start the New Year with traditional ceremonies and pujas. This tradition has been followed as a ritual for many years.

Muhurat trading is traditionally an occasion for an auspicious beginning to the traditional New Year. Investors place token orders and buy stocks for their children, which are held for the long term and sometimes never sold. Traders normally book their intraday profits, however small they may be.

== Tradition ==
Amongst the several communities of India, the new year begins with Diwali. A puja (ritual) is performed to accounts books and safes on Dhanteras as well as on Diwali day to signify the beginning of a new year. A coin - which signifies wealth - is placed on the account books before the puja. Stock brokers perform 'Lakshmi Puja' at the exchange and the customary Muhurat trading takes place. It is believed that on the night of Lakshmi Puja, the Goddess comes to reside at the place of the puja during which the traders and shopkeepers stay awake with lights burning all night.

As Diwali also marks the beginning of the New Year, it is believed that Muhurat trading on this day brings in wealth and prosperity throughout the year. An auspicious beginning is thus made on the first day of the year.

== See also ==
- National Stock Exchange of India
- Bombay Stock Exchange
