= Phiroze Jeejeebhoy Towers =

Skyscraper in Mumbai, India

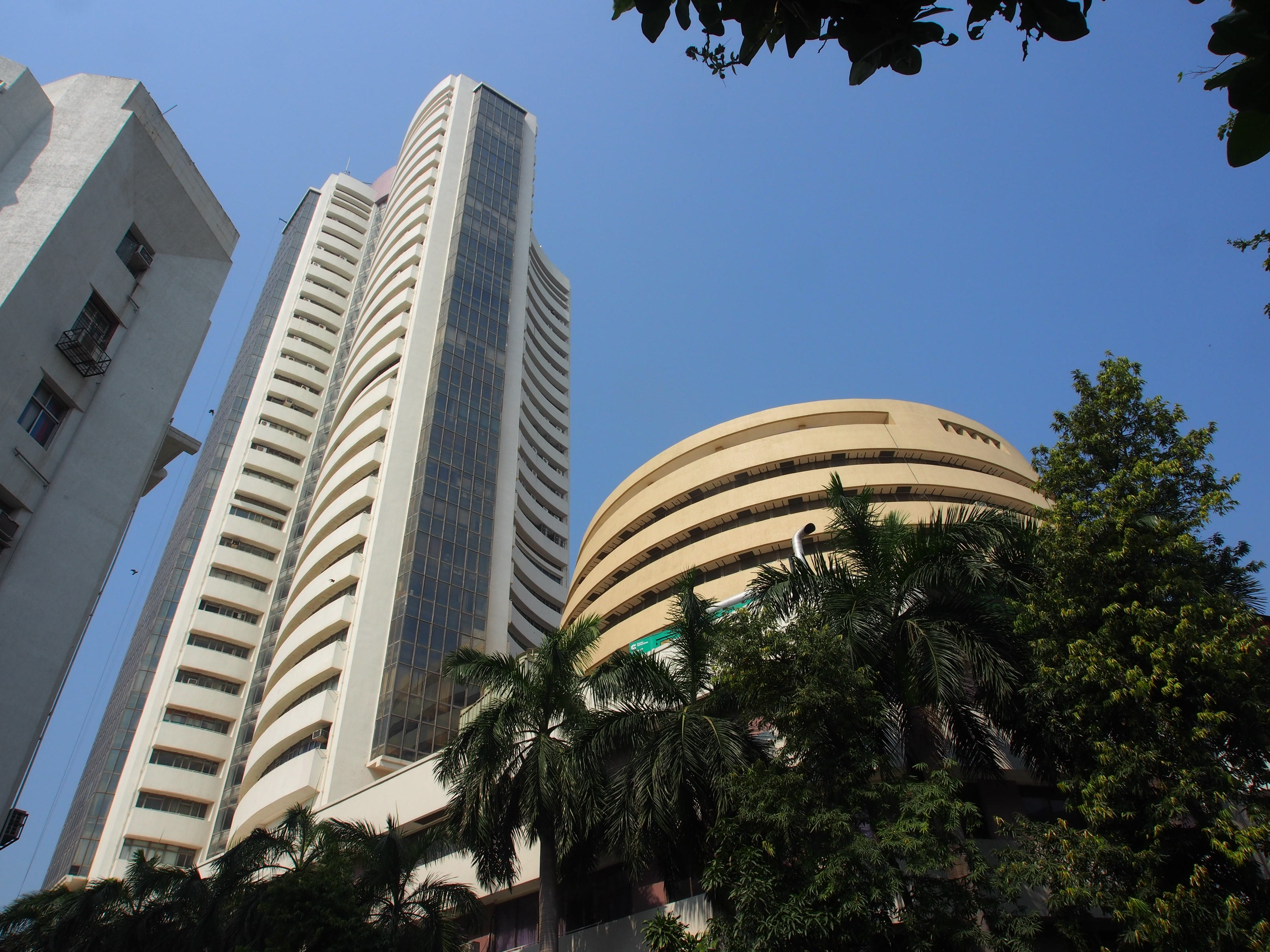
- Interactive map of the Phiroze Jeejeebhoy Towers area

General information
- Architectural style: Modernism
- Location: Mumbai, Dalal Street, Mumbai 400001, India
- Coordinates: 18.929681°N 72.833589°E
- Current tenants: Bombay Stock Exchange
- Completed: 1980
- Owner: Bombay Stock Exchange

Height
- Height: 117.96 metres (387.0 ft)

Technical details
- Floor count: 29

Design and construction
- Architect: Ar. Chandrakant Patel
- Architecture firm: Architectural Research Unit
- Structural engineer: Hadkar Prabhu & Associates
- Main contractor: Larsen & Toubro Limited

The Phiroze Jeejeebhoy Towers, popularly known by its original name of BSE Towers, is a 29-storey building in downtown Mumbai on Dalal Street, near its intersection with the Mumbai Samachar Marg. The building is owned and occupied by the Bombay Stock Exchange (BSE). BSE has secured a trademark for its iconic building.

== History ==
Prior to 1928, the Bombay Stock Exchange (BSE) operated out of a building near the Town Hall. The present site near Horniman Circle was acquired by the exchange in 1928, and a building was constructed and occupied in 1930. The street on which the site is located came to be called Dalal Street in Hindi (English: Broker Street) due to the location of the exchange.

Construction of the current towers began in the late 1970s, with the building completed and occupied by the BSE in 1980. It was initially called BSE Towers. Soon after occupation, following the death of Sir Phiroze Jamshedji Jeejeebhoy, chairman of the BSE since 1966, the building was renamed in his memory. Upon its completion, it became one of the tallest buildings in India.

The building was one of the targets of the 1993 Bombay bombings. The first of the 13 bomb blasts occurred at 13:25 hours on 12 March 1993 in the basement garage of the building. Almost 50 brokers and traders were killed and 30 cars were destroyed in the attack.

== See also ==
- Dalal Street
- Fort (Mumbai)
