= Vikram Limaye =

Indian businessman

MD & CEO of the National Stock Exchange of India
- In office February 2017 – 16 July 2022
- Preceded by: Chitra Ramkrishna
- Succeeded by: Ashish Chauhan

Personal details
- Born: Vikram Kuamr Limaye; 1966
- Citizenship: India
- Education: (BCom); University of Mumbai (MBA); University of Pennsylvania
- Occupation: Former MD & CEO of NSE, Chairman of the working committee of World Federation of Exchanges

Vikram Limaye is an Indian business executive who was the Managing Director and CEO of the National Stock Exchange of India Limited (NSE) between 2017 and 2022.

== Career ==
He started his professional career with Arthur Andersen in Mumbai in 1987, while pursuing his Chartered Accountancy and worked in the audit and business advisory services groups of Arthur Andersen, Ernst & Young and the consumer banking group of Citibank, before going to the US in 1994 to pursue an MBA. After completing his MBA, he worked on Wall Street in the US for 8 years with Credit Suisse First Boston in investment banking, capital markets, structured finance and credit portfolio management before returning to Mumbai, India, in 2004.

Prior to joining NSE, Limaye was the managing director and CEO of IDFC, a diversified financial services conglomerate.

He has contributed to various committees of government and industry associations, on a range of topics surrounding infrastructure, economic policy, markets, trade, minority affairs etc. He has been a speaker at various domestic and international conferences and has been part of international government delegations for infrastructure and foreign direct investments into India. He has also been on the boards of various corporates, educational institutions and not for profit organisations. He was appointed by the Supreme Court of India to the Committee of Administrators for governance and administration of the Board of Control for Cricket in India (BCCI). He was a member of the board of directors of the World Federation of Exchanges (WFE) and has also served as the chairman of the working committee of WFE.

== Education ==
He completed his BCom from the H.R. College of Commerce and Economics, Chartered Accountancy and MBA in finance and multinational management from the Wharton School of the University of Pennsylvania, US.
