= Chitra Ramkrishna =

Indian businesswoman and a scamster

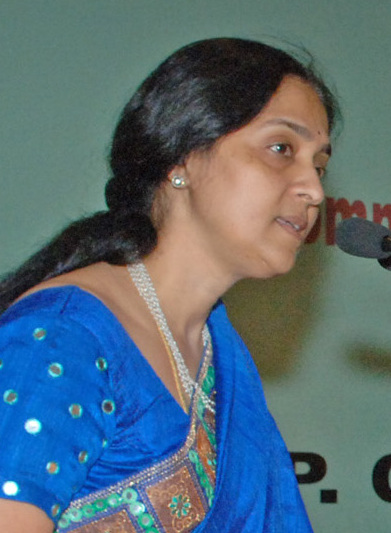

MD & CEO of the National Stock Exchange of India
- In office 1 April 2013 – 2 December 2016
- Preceded by: Ravi Narain
- Succeeded by: Vikram Limaye

Personal details
- Born: 1963 (age 63)
- Education: Institute of Chartered Accountants of India

Chitra Ramkrishna (born 1963) is an Indian businesswoman and the former chief executive officer of National Stock Exchange (NSE). In March 2022, she was arrested by the Central Bureau of Investigation (CBI) for her involvement in the co-location scam.

== Career ==
In 1985, she started as a chartered accountant, at the project finance division of the Industrial Development Bank of India (IDBI). Ramkrishna then spend two years at the Securities and Exchange Board of India (SEBI), after which she returned to IDBI. In April 2013, she succeeded Ravi Narain and became the managing director and CEO of NSE.

== Cases ==
=== Co-location case ===
In 2016, she was found guilty in a co-location case, and was asked by SEBI to disgorge 25 percent of the salary drawn for FY 2013–14, to the IPEF. She was also, prohibited from associating with a listed company or a market Infrastructure Institution or any other market intermediary for a period of five years.

=== 'Himalayan Yogi' case ===
In February 2022, the Securities and Exchange Board of India (SEBI) said that for the past 20 years, she had been allowing an unidentified 'Himalayan yogi' to advise her on important decisions. The case was investigated by the CBI. She leaked key business information pertaining to day-to-day operations. She was arrested by the CBI on 7 March 2022.

== See also ==
- Chanda Kochhar
