= NSE EMERGE =

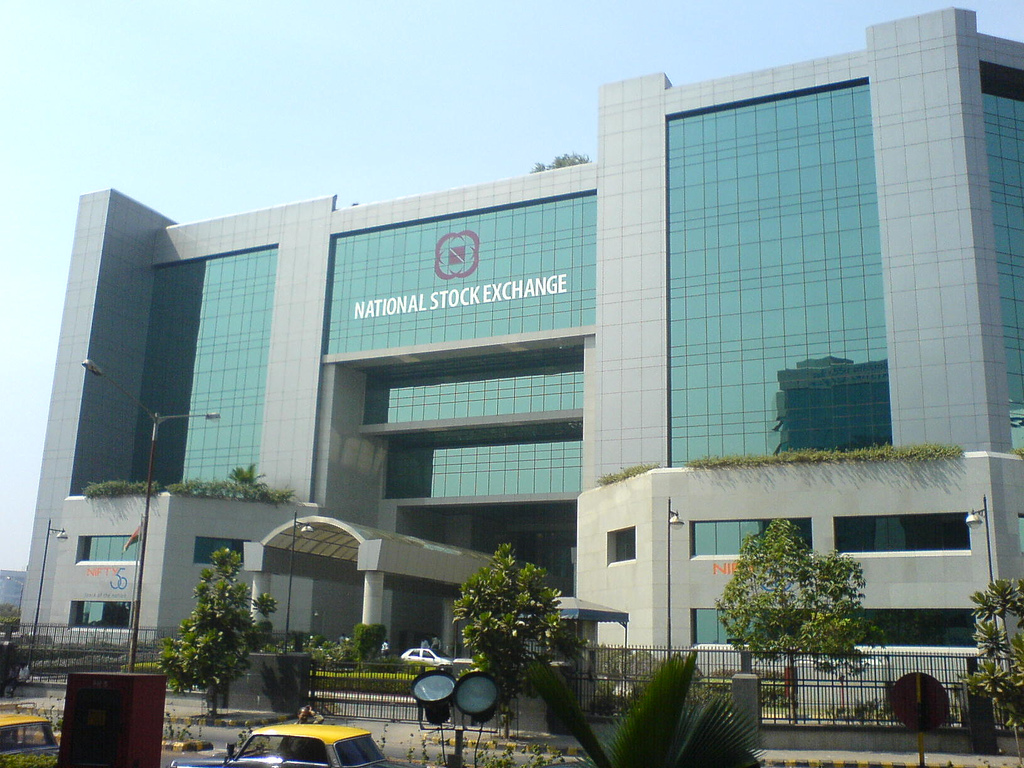
- Type: Stock exchange
- Location: Mumbai, India
- Founded: 2012
- Owner: National Stock Exchange of India Limited
- Currency: Indian rupee (₹)
- No. of listings: 200 (Sept 2019)
- Website: www.nseindia.com/emerge/

NSE EMERGE is the National Stock Exchange of India's new initiative for small and medium-sized enterprises and startup companies from India. These companies can get listed on NSE without Initial public offering (IPO). This platform helps SMEs and Startups to connect with investors for funding. During August 2019, NSE got the 200th company listed on its SME platform. As of 30 September 2024, 556 companies had listed on the Emerge platform, raising approximately INR 14,145 crore collectively.

The First company listed on the SME IPO platform was Thejo Engineering from Chennai.

Small and Medium Enterprises (SME) Initial Public Offerings (IPOs) serve as a critical avenue for smaller businesses to raise capital and expand their operations. SME IPOs are typically listed on dedicated platforms, such as the SME exchanges of leading stock markets, which are tailored to meet the unique needs of smaller enterprises. These platforms offer lower compliance requirements and reduced listing costs compared to the main board, making them accessible for emerging businesses. Investors in SME IPOs often benefit from higher growth potential, although they must be prepared for increased risks due to the smaller size and limited operational history of the companies. SME IPOs play a significant role in fostering entrepreneurship and boosting economic growth.

== List of the Companies with SME IPO ==
Since FY 2013, Following companies did SME IPO on National Stock Exchange of India's NSE EMERGE.

- A And M Jumbo Bags Limited
- A B Infrabuild Limited
- Aakash Exploration Services Limited
- Aaron Industries Limited
- Aarvi Encon Limited
- Accord Synergy Limited
- Accuracy Shipping Limited
- Ace Integrated Solutions Limited
- Ahimsa Industries Limited
- Ahlada Engineers Limited
- Airo Lam Limited
- Ajooni Biotech Limited
- Akash Infra Projects Limited
- Akg Exim Limited
- Ambani Organics Limited
- Ani Integrated Services Limited
- Art Nirman Limited
- Artedz Fabs Limited
- Arunaya Organics Limited
- Arvee Laboratories (India) Limited
- Asl Industries Limited
- Aurangabad Distillery Limited
- Avg Logistics Limited
- Avon Moldplast Limited
- Avsl Industries Limited
- B&b Triplewall Containers Limited
- Baba Agro Food Limited
- Banka Bioloo Limited
- Bansal Multiflex Limited
- Beta Drugs Limited
- Bohra Industries Limited
- Bombay Super Hybrid Seeds Limited
- Brand Concepts Limited
- Bright Solar Limited
- Cadsys (India) Limited
- Ckp Leisure Limited
- Ckp Products Limited
- CMM Infraprojects Limited
- Continental Seeds And Chemicals Limited
- Crown Lifters Limited
- D P Wires Limited
- D. P. Abhushan Limited
- Dangee Dums Limited
- Debock Sales And Marketing Limited
- Dev Information Technology Limited
- Dhanuka Realty Limited
- Drs Dilip Roadlines Limited
- E2e Networks Limited
- Emkay Taps And Cutting Tools Limited
- Euro India Fresh Foods Limited
- Felix Industries Limited
- Five Core Electronics Limited
- Focus Lighting And Fixtures Limited
- Fourth Dimension Solutions Limited
- Ganga Forging Limited
- Geekay Wires Limited
- Giriraj Civil Developers Limited
- Global Education Limited
- Globe International Carriers Limited
- Globe Textiles (India) Limited
- Godha Cabcon & Insulation Limited
- Goldstar Power Limited
- Gretex Industries Limited
- Hec Infra Projects Limited
- Hindcon Chemicals Limited
- Husys Consulting Limited
- Ice Make Refrigeration Limited
- Innovana Thinklabs Limited
- Innovative Tyres And Tubes Limited
- Iris Clothings Limited
- Jakharia Fabric Limited
- Jalan Transolutions (India) Limited
- Jash Engineering Limited
- Jet Freight Logistics Limited
- Jet Knitwears Limited
- Kapston Facilities Management Limited
- Keerti Knowledge And Skills Limited
- Khfm Hospitality And Facility Management Services Limited
- Kkv Agro Powers Limited
- Kritika Wires Limited
- Kshitij Polyline Limited
- Lagnam Spintex Limited
- Latteys Industries Limited
- Laxmi Cotspin Limited
- Lexus Granito (India) Limited
- M K Proteins Limited
- Macpower Cnc Machines Limited
- Madhav Copper Limited
- Madhya Pradesh Today Media Limited
- Mahickra Chemicals Limited
- Manav Infra Projects Limited
- Marine Electricals (India) Limited
- Marshall Machines Limited
- Marvel Decor Limited
- Milton Industries Limited
- Mindpool Technologies Limited
- Mitcon Consultancy & Engineering Services Limited
- Mittal Life Style Limited
- Mmp Industries Limited
- Mohini Health & Hygiene Limited
- Moksh Ornaments Limited
- Nandani Creation Limited
- Narmada Agrobase Limited
- Nitiraj Engineers Limited
- Omfurn India Limited
- Opal Luxury Time Products Limited
- Osia Hyper Retail Limited
- Panache Digilife Limited
- Pansari Developers Limited
- Par Drugs And Chemicals Limited
- Parin Furniture Limited
- Pashupati Cotspin Limited
- Penta Gold Limited
- Perfect Infraengineers Limited
- Power & Instrumentation (Gujarat) Limited
- Powerful Technologies Limited
- Priti International Limited
- Prizor Viztech Limited
- Prolife Industries Limited
- Pulz Electronics Limited
- Pushpanjali Realms And Infratech Limited
- R M Drip And Sprinklers Systems Limited
- Rajnandini Metal Limited
- Rajputana Biodiesel Limited
- Rajshree Polypack Limited
- Reliable Data Services Limited
- Rkec Projects Limited
- S.s. Infrastructure Development Consultants Limited
- Saketh Exim Limited
- Salasar Exteriors And Contour Limited
- Sarveshwar Foods Limited
- Secur Credentials Limited
- Servotech Power Systems Limited
- Shaival Reality Limited
- Shanti Overseas (India) Limited
- Shradha Infraprojects Limited
- Shree Ram Proteins Limited
- Shree Tirupati Balajee Fibc Limited
- Shree Vasu Logistics Limited
- Shreeoswal Seeds And Chemicals Limited
- Shri Ram Switchgears Limited
- Shubhlaxmi Jewel Art Limited
- Sikko Industries Limited
- Silgo Retail Limited
- Silly Monks Entertainment Limited
- Silver Touch Technologies Limited
- Sintercom India Limited
- Sks Textiles Limited
- Smvd Poly Pack Limited
- Softtech Engineers Limited
- Solex Energy Limited
- Sonam Clock Limited
- Soni Soya Products Limited
- Spectrum Electrical Industries Limited
- Supreme (India) Impex Limited
- Supreme Engineering Limited
- Surani Steel Tubes Limited
- Surevin Bpo Services Limited
- Suumaya Lifestyle Limited
- Tara Chand Logistic Solutions Limited
- Thejo Engineering Limited
- Tirupati Forge Limited
- Total Transport Systems Limited
- Touchwood Entertainment Limited
- Transwind Infrastructures Limited
- Ultra Wiring Connectivity System Limited
- Uniinfo Telecom Services Limited
- United Polyfab Gujarat Limited
- Univastu India Limited
- Uravi T And Wedge Lamps Limited
- Ushanti Colour Chem Limited
- Vadivarhe Speciality Chemicals Limited
- Vaishali Pharma Limited
- VASA Denticity Limited
- Vasa Retail And Overseas Ltd
- Vera Synthetic Limited
- Vertoz Advertising Limited
- Vinny Overseas Limited
- Wealth First Portfolio Managers Limited
- Wonder Fibromats Limited
- Worth Peripherals Limited
- Zodiac Energy Limited
