= Clause 49 =

Clause 49 of the Listing Agreement for the Indian stock exchange, effective December 31, 2005, was formulated to improve corporate governance in all listed companies.

== Background ==
In corporate hierarchy two types of managements are envisaged:

i) companies managed by Board of Directors; and
ii) those by a Managing Director, whole-time director or manager subject to the control and guidance of the Board of Directors i.e., he is liable to the Board of Directors and the function of the corporate.

- As per Clause 49, for a company with an Executive Chairman, at least 50 per cent of the board should comprise independent directors. In the case of a company with a non-executive Chairman, at least one-third of the board should be independent directors.
- It would be necessary for chief executives and chief financial officers to establish and maintain internal controls and implement remediation and risk mitigation towards deficiencies in internal controls, among others.
- Clause VI (ii) of Clause 49 requires all companies to submit a quarterly compliance report to stock exchange in the prescribed form. The clause also requires that there be a separate section on corporate governance in the annual report with a detailed compliance report.
- A company is also required to obtain a certificate either from auditors or practicing company secretaries regarding compliance of conditions as stipulated, and annex the same to the director's report.
- The clause mandates composition of an audit committee; one of the directors is required to be "financially literate".
- It is mandatory for all listed companies to comply with the clause by 31 December 2005.

Corporate Governance may be defined as “A set of systems, processes and principles which ensure that a company is governed in the best interest of all stakeholders.” It ensures Commitment to values and ethical conduct of business; Transparency in business transactions; Statutory and legal compliance; adequate disclosures and Effective decision-making to achieve corporate objectives. In other words, Corporate Governance is about promoting corporate fairness, transparency and accountability. Good Corporate Governance is simply Good Business.

Clause 49 of the SEBI guidelines on Corporate Governance as amended on 29 October 2004 has made major changes in the definition of independent directors, strengthening the responsibilities of audit committees, improving quality of financial disclosures, including those relating to related party transactions and proceeds from public/ rights/ preferential issues, requiring Boards to adopt formal code of conduct, requiring CEO/CFO certification of financial statements and for improving disclosures to shareholders. Certain non-mandatory clauses like whistle blower policy and restriction of the term of independent directors have also been included.

The term ‘Clause 49’ refers to clause number 49 of the Listing Agreement between a company and the stock exchanges on which it is listed (the Listing Agreement is identical for all Indian stock exchanges, including the NSE and BSE). This clause is a recent addition to the Listing Agreement and was inserted as late as 2000 consequent to the recommendations of the Kumarmangalam Birla Committee on Corporate Governance constituted by the Securities Exchange Board of India (SEBI) in 1999.

Clause 49, when it was first added, was intended to introduce some basic corporate governance practices in Indian companies and brought in a number of key changes in governance and disclosures (many of which we take for granted today). It specified the minimum number of independent directors required on the board of a company. The setting up of an Audit committee, and a Shareholders’ Grievance committee, among others, were made mandatory as were the Management’s Discussion and Analysis (MD&A) section and the Report on Corporate Governance in the Annual Report, and disclosures of fees paid to non-executive directors. A limit was placed on the number of committees that a director could serve on.

== Origins ==
In late 2002, SEBI constituted a Committee to assess the adequacy of current corporate governance practices and to suggest improvements. Based on the recommendations of this committee, SEBI issued a modified Clause 49 on 29 October 2004 (the ‘revised Clause 49’) which came into operation on 1 January 2006.

The revised Clause 49 has suitably pushed forward the original intent of protecting the interests of investors through enhanced governance practices and disclosures. Five broad themes predominate. The independence criteria for directors have been clarified. The roles and responsibilities of the board have been enhanced. The quality and quantity of disclosures have improved. The roles and responsibilities of the audit committee in all matters relating to internal controls and financial reporting have been consolidated, and the accountability of top management—specifically the CEO and CFO—has been enhanced. Within each of these areas, the revised Clause 49 moves further into the realm of global best practices (and sometimes, even beyond).

By Circular dated 8 April 2008, the Securities and Exchange Board of India amended Clause 49 of the Listing Agreement to extent the 50% independent directors rule to all Boards of Directors where the Non-Executive Chairman is a promoter of the Company or related to the promoters of the company.

At the end of the first India Corporate Week in December 2009, the Ministry of Corporate Affairs issued new Corporate Governance Voluntary Guidelines and new Corporate Social Responsibility Voluntary Guidelines.
