= Dalal Street =

Street in Mumbai; metonym for Indian finance

Coordinates: 18°55′46.08″N 72°49′59.12″E

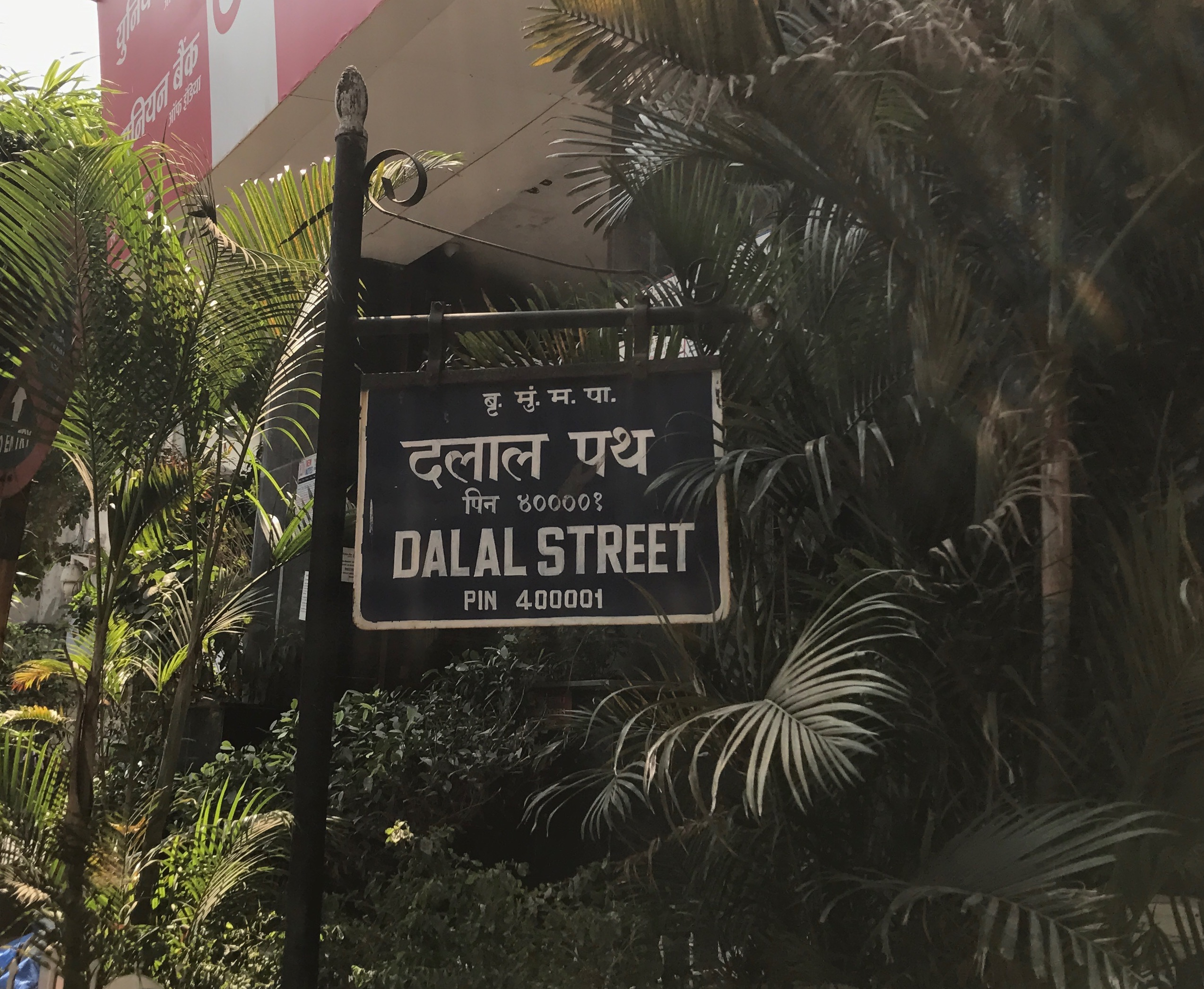
- Dalal Street Sign
- Interactive map of Dalal Street

Other
- Website: www.dsij.in

Dalal Street (Marathi: dalāl gallī), (Hindi: dalāl path) is the metonym for the financial markets of India, the Indian financial services industry of the country as a whole, or the actual financial district itself. It is located in the Financial District of Fort in Mumbai and is the address of the Bombay Stock Exchange and several other major financial institutions of the world. The Marathi word dalāl means "a broker", "a go-between".

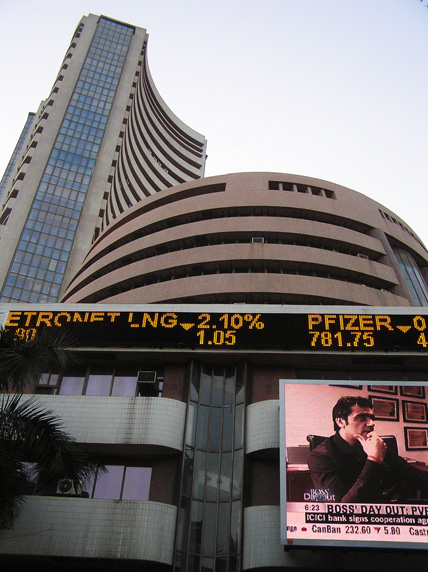
The Bombay Stock Exchange on the Dalal Street

In 2008, there was a proposal to rename the street after Nagarmal Saraf, a broker who worked at the BSE for 25 years.

== In the media ==
The Mumbai based video game Mumbai Gullies is expected to feature the Dalal Street in the fictional map.

== See also ==
- Bombay Stock Exchange
- Phiroze Jeejeebhoy Towers
- Phiroze Jamshedji Jeejeebhoy
- Fort (Mumbai)
- Economy of India
- Economy of Mumbai
- National Stock Exchange of India
