= BSE Tower (Bucharest) =

Stock Exchange building

Coordinates: 44.436618°N 26.109478°E

- Interactive map of the BSE Tower area

General information
- Status: Completed
- Location: Bucharest, Romania
- Construction started: 2001
- Opening: 2003

Height
- Roof: 56 m (184 ft)

Technical details
- Floor count: 16
- Floor area: 14,000 m^{2} (150,000 sq ft)

BSE Tower or Bucharest Stock Exchange Tower is an office building located in the city of Bucharest, Romania. It has 16 floors and a surface of 14,000 m^{2}. The building is the headquarters of the Bucharest Stock Exchange.
