= Business Trust in India =

Types of investment trust in India

Business Trust in India is a new concept drawn on the lines of a similar concept prevalent in the Singaporean economy.

== History ==
Historically, even in countries such as the United States and Singapore, it has taken significant time for REITs to pick up.

== Objective ==
Real Estate Investment Trusts (REITs) aimed at attracting funds in a transparent manner into the real estate sector.

== Types ==
There are two types of Business Trusts which can be formed in India.

=== Real Estate Investment Trusts (REITs) ===
A REIT, structured as a real estate counterpart to mutual funds, allows small investors to invest in a diversified portfolio of rent-yielding realty assets. Specialist REITs like Alexandria and Prologis focused on healthcare research and industrial assets have come of age in the US. The total estimated rental income potential of commercial Grade A stock in top eight Indian cities is ₹518 billion (US$5.4 billion) by 2019, according to global real estate consultancy Cushman & Wakefield.

=== Infrastructure Investment Trusts (InvITs) ===
InvITs are similar to the Real Estate Investment Trust; however, the InvITs invest in infrastructure like roads, bridges etc. On September 26, 2014, the Securities and Exchange Board of India (SEBI) introduced the InvITs, and the SEBI acts as the regulatory body. InvIT is a collective investment scheme that allows individuals and institutional investors to directly invest in infrastructural projects for a share of the annual distribution of dividends and interests. The structure of InvITs includes a trustee, a sponsor, investment manager and project manager.

== SEBI guidelines ==
The guidelines, approved by its Sebi board, have kept the minimum requirement for asset sizes permitted to be listed in India at ₹5 billion (US$52 million). The minimum issue size of the initial public offer shouldn't be less than ₹2.50 billion (US$26 million).

== Taxation ==
As a benefit, any dividend would be tax exempt in the hands of the business trust and the dividend component of the income distributed by the business trust would also be exempt in the hands of unit holder. Any interest received by business trust from SPV is taxable in hands of Unit holder with Normal Tax rate slab (as per Income Tax Act, 1961) and 5% in case of Non resident or foreign Companies.
