= National Stock Exchange of India =

Indian stock exchange in Mumbai

Coordinates: 19°3′37″N 72°51′35″E

National Stock Exchange of India Limited

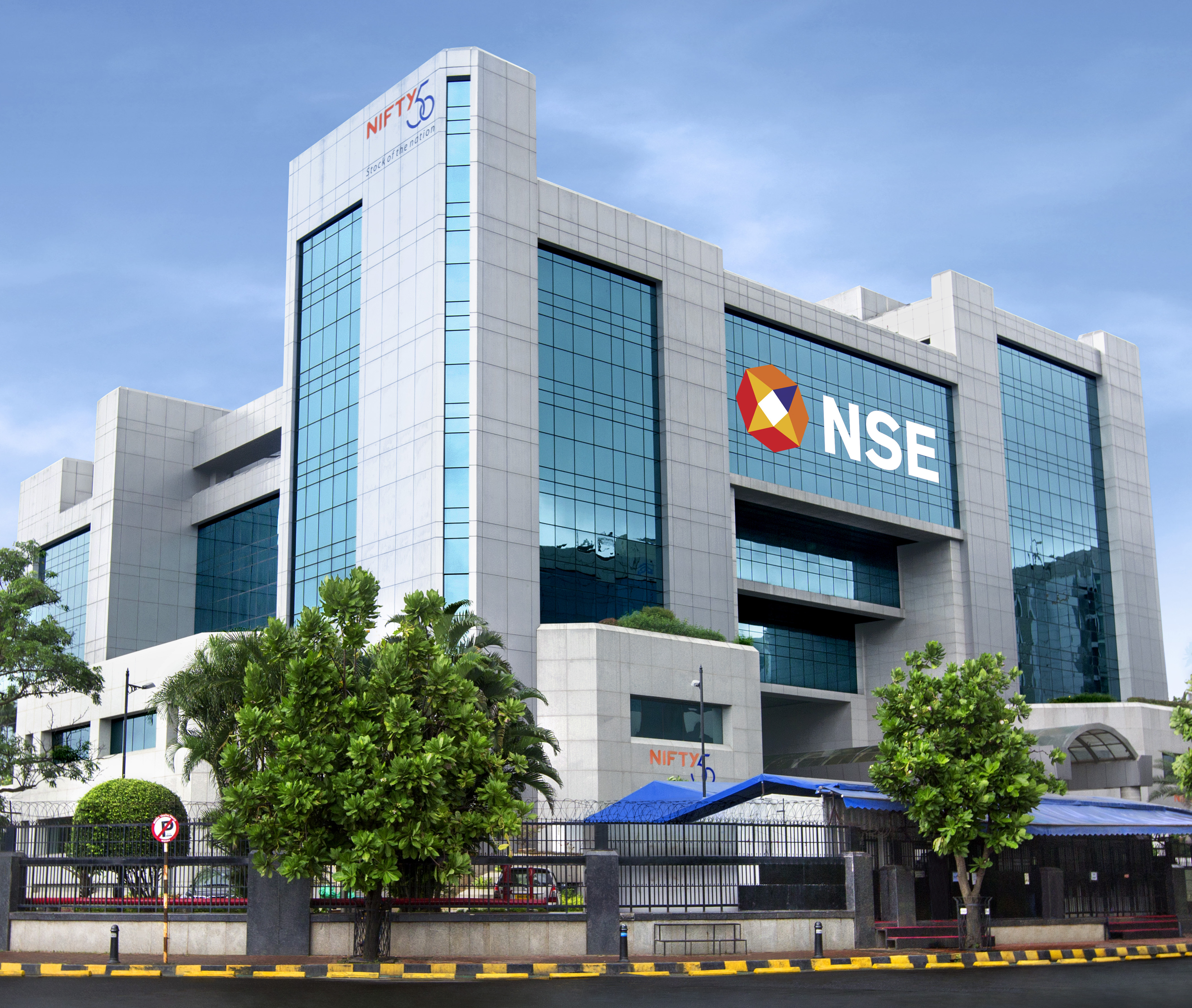
- Corporate headquarters in Mumbai
- Type: Stock exchange
- Location: Mumbai, Maharashtra, India
- Founded: 27 November 1992; 33 years ago
- Owner: Various domestic and global financial institutions, public and privately-owned entities, and individuals
- Key people: Ashishkumar Chauhan (MD & CEO)
- Currency: Indian rupee (₹)
- No. of listings: 2,671 (December 2024)
- Market cap: ₹438 lakh crore (US$4.7 trillion) (December 2024)
- Indices: NIFTY 50; NIFTY Next 50; NIFTY 500
- Traded as: NSE: NSE; BSE: 544937
- ISIN: INE721I01024
- Headquarters: Mumbai
- Revenue: ▲₹19,177 crore (US$2.0 billion) (2025)
- Net income: ▲₹12,188 crore (US$1.3 billion) (2025)
- Website: www.nseindia.com
- Footnotes; Financials as of 31 March 2025.

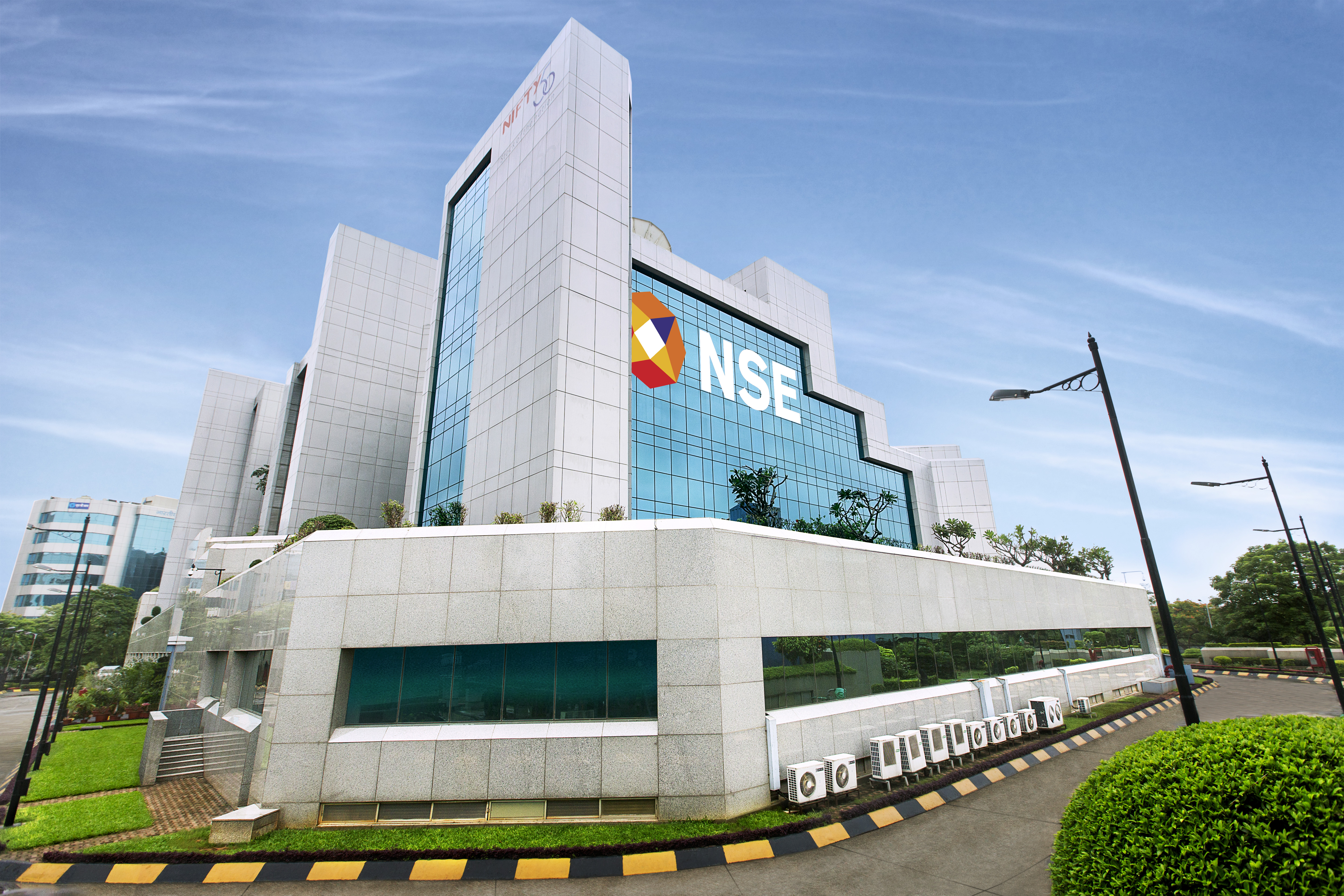
The National Stock Exchange building in the Bandra Kurla Complex in Mumbai

National Stock Exchange of India Limited, also known as the National Stock Exchange (NSE), is an Indian stock exchange based in Mumbai. It is the 9th largest stock exchange in the world by total market capitalization, exceeding $5 trillion in May 2024.

NSE is under the ownership of various financial institutions such as banks and insurance companies. As of 2024, it is the world's largest derivatives exchange by number of contracts traded (Note: Based on the statistics maintained by Futures Industry Association (FIA), a derivatives trade body) and the third largest in cash equities by number of trades (Note: As per the statistics maintained by the World Federation of Exchanges (WFE)) for the calendar year 2023. On 24 September 2026, National Stock Exchange Ltd. was listed on the Bombay Stock Exchange (BSE).

== History ==
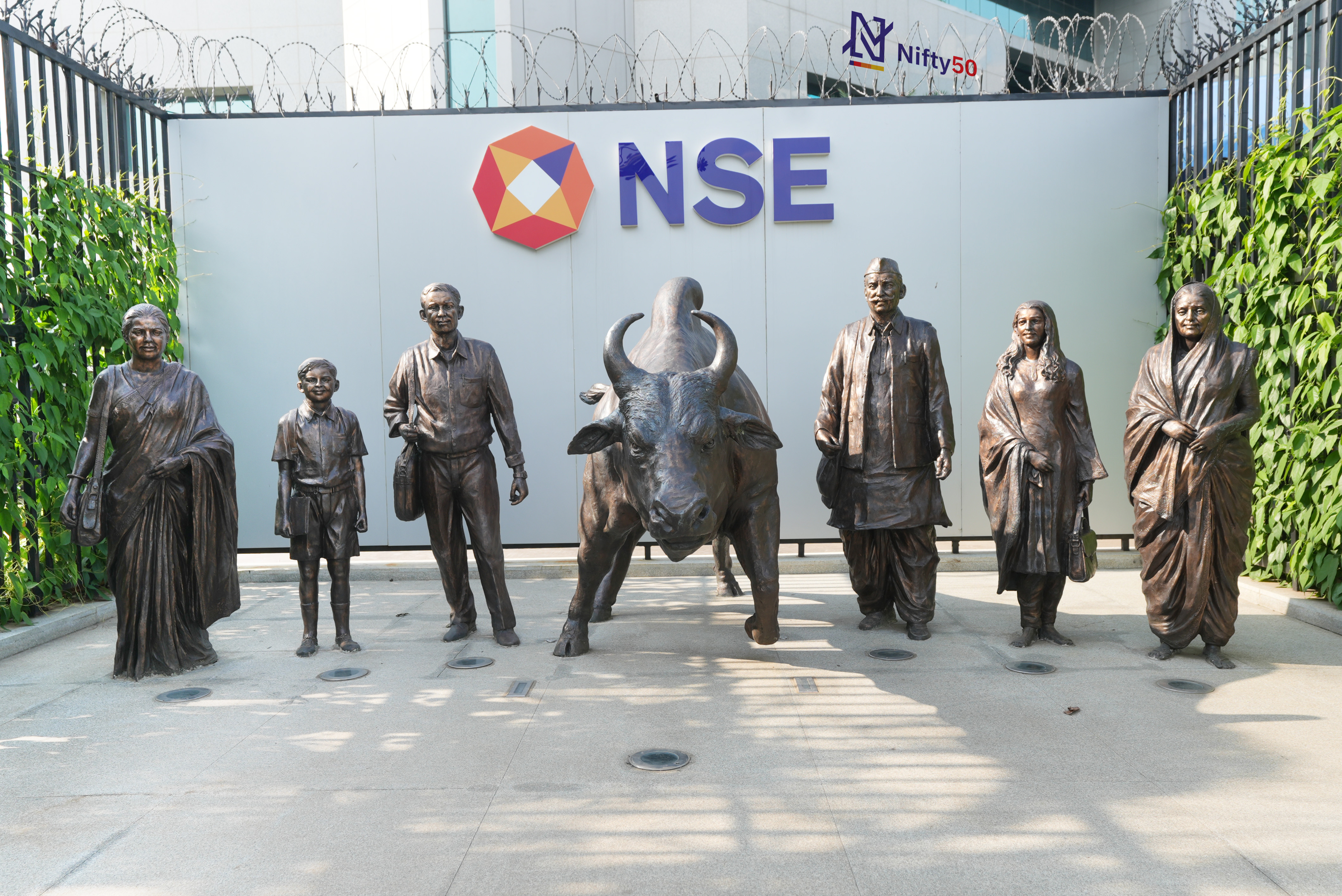
Sculptures at NSE headquarters in Mumbai

National Stock Exchange was incorporated in 1992 to bring about transparency in the Indian equity markets. NSE was set up as a Joint-venture between PSUs at the behest of the Government of India, based on the recommendations laid out by the Pherwani committee in 1991 and the blueprint was prepared by a team of five members (Ravi Narain, Raghavan Puthran, K Kumar, Chitra Ramkrishna and Ashishkumar Chauhan) along with R H Patil and SS Nadkarni who were deputed by IDBI in 1992. Instead of trading memberships being confined to a group of brokers, NSE ensured that anyone who was qualified, experienced, and met the minimum financial requirements was allowed to trade.

NSE commenced operations on 30 June 1994 starting with the wholesale debt market (WDM) segment and equities segment on 3 November 1994. It was the first exchange in India to introduce an electronic trading facility. Within one year of the start of its operations, the daily turnover on NSE exceeded that of the BSE.

Operations in the derivatives segment commenced on 12 June 2000. In August 2008, NSE introduced currency derivatives.

In 2012, NSE launched the NSE EMERGE platform for the listing of small and medium-sized enterprises (SME) and startup companies in India.

In May 2013, NSE launched India's first dedicated trading platform for debt-related products.

In June 2017, NSE established the NSE International Exchange (NSE IX), which is a universal multi assets exchange headquartered in the GIFT City. NSE IX is the second international stock exchange of India, after the India International Exchange (India INX), which is also headquartered in GIFT City.

In 2023, NSE launched the Social Stock Exchange to allow social enterprises, including non-profit organisations, raise funds from the public.

In May 2026, the National Stock Exchange of India launched Electronic Gold Receipts (EGRs), a new exchange-traded digital gold segment backed by physical gold stored in SEBI-accredited vaults, aimed at improving transparency and efficiency in gold trading.

In September, the National Stock Exchange launched its Initial Public Offering (IPO), raising ₹22,569 crore (US$2.7 billion). The offering was oversubscribed 5.71 times, making it India’s second-largest IPO at the time.

== Trading ==
=== Listings ===
As of December 2024, NSE has 2,671 companies listed, with 2,084 companies listed on the mainboard and 587 companies listed on its SME platform−NSE EMERGE. Total market capitalization of NSE-listed companies was ₹438.9 lakh crore (US$5.13 trillion), as of 31 December 2024.

As of December 2023, there were 190 ETFs listed on the NSE, including ETFs on equity, debt and commodity asset classes. The first InvIT listed on the NSE in 2017 and the first REIT in 2019.

As of January 2025, NSE has over 11 crore unique registered investors.

=== Indices ===
NSE Indices operates NSE's broad-based, sectoral, thematic, strategy and fixed-income indices. The flagship index NIFTY 50 was launched on 22 April 1996, with a base value of 1,000 on the base date of 3 November 1995.

=== Derivatives ===
The NSE allows trading of futures and options contracts of indices and single stock contracts.

On 3 May 2012, the National Stock exchange launched derivative contracts (futures and options) on FTSE 100, a widely tracked index of the UK equity stock market. On 10 January 2013, the National Stock Exchange signed a letter of intent with the Japan Exchange Group, Inc. (JPX) for the launch of NIFTY 50 index futures on the Osaka Securities Exchange (OSE).

== Corporate affairs ==
=== Stakeholders ===
As of March 2025, NSE is 36% majorly owned by PSUs that include Life Insurance Corporation (10.7%), State Bank of India (3.23%), SBI Caps (4.33%), New India Assurance (1.42%), National Insurance (1.42% ), Oriental Insurance (1.42%), Stock Holding Corporation of India Limited (4.40%) and other PSBs such as Bank of Baroda, IDBI Bank, Punjab National Bank & Indian Bank. Private equity investors include Aranda Investments Mauritius Pte Ltd (Temasek Holdings), PI Opportunities Fund I (PremjiInvest) and MS Strategic Mauritius Pte Ltd (Morgan Stanley).

=== Disinvestment ===
Government of India has allowed seven major PSUs such as SBI, IDBI and Bank of Baroda to sell their entire stake in NSE through upcoming IPO.

=== Leadership ===
The list of CEO and MDs of NSE includes:

No.	Name	Term of office			Ref.
No.	Name	Assumed office	Left office	Time in office	Ref.
1	Ravi Narain	2000	1 April 2013	12 years, 151 days	
2	Chitra Ramkrishna	1 April 2013	2 December 2016	3 years, 245 days	
3	Vikram Limaye	6 February 2017	16 July 2022	5 years, 160 days	
4	Ashish Chauhan	18 July 2022	Incumbent	4 years, 119 days	

== Subsidiaries ==
- NSE Indices Limited
- NSE International Exchange (NSE IX), via NSE IFSC Limited
- NSE Clearing Limited
- NSE NSEIT Limited
- NSE Infotech Services Limited
- NSE Cogencis Information Services Limited
- NSE IFSC Clearing Corporation Limited
- NSE Investments Limited
- NSE Data & Analytics Limited
- NSE Academy Limited

== Financial literacy ==
NSE has collaborated with several universities like Gokhale Institute of Politics & Economics (GIPE) - Pune, Bharati Vidyapeeth Deemed University (BVDU) - Pune, Guru Gobind Singh Indraprastha University - Delhi, RV University - Bangalore, the Ravenshaw University - Cuttack and Punjabi University - Patiala, among others to offer MBA and BBA courses. NSE has also provided mock market simulation software called NSE Learn to Trade (NLT) to develop investment, trading, and portfolio management skills among the students. The simulation software is very similar to the software currently being used by the market professionals and helps students to learn how to trade in the markets. NSE also conducts online examinations and awards certification, under its Certification in Financial Markets (NCFM) programs. NSE has set up NSE Academy Limited to further financial literacy.

At present, certifications are available in 46 modules, covering different sectors of financial and capital markets, both at the beginner and advanced levels. The list of various modules can be found at the official site of NSE India. In addition, since August 2009, it has offered a short-term course called NSE Certified Capital Market Professional (NCCMP).

== Criticism and controversies ==
NSE has witnessed several high-profile market manipulation scandals including the co-location manipulation instance. At times, the Securities and Exchange Board of India (SEBI) has barred several individuals and entities from trading on the exchange for insider trading, stock manipulation, especially in illiquid smallcaps and penny stocks.

== See also ==
- List of companies listed on the National Stock Exchange of India
- Economy of India
- List of stock exchanges
- Bombay Stock Exchange
- Stock market crashes in India
- Mutual funds in India
- Muhurat trading
- Clause 49
- Securities and Exchange Board of India
