= Bombay Stock Exchange =

Indian stock exchange in Mumbai

BSE Limited

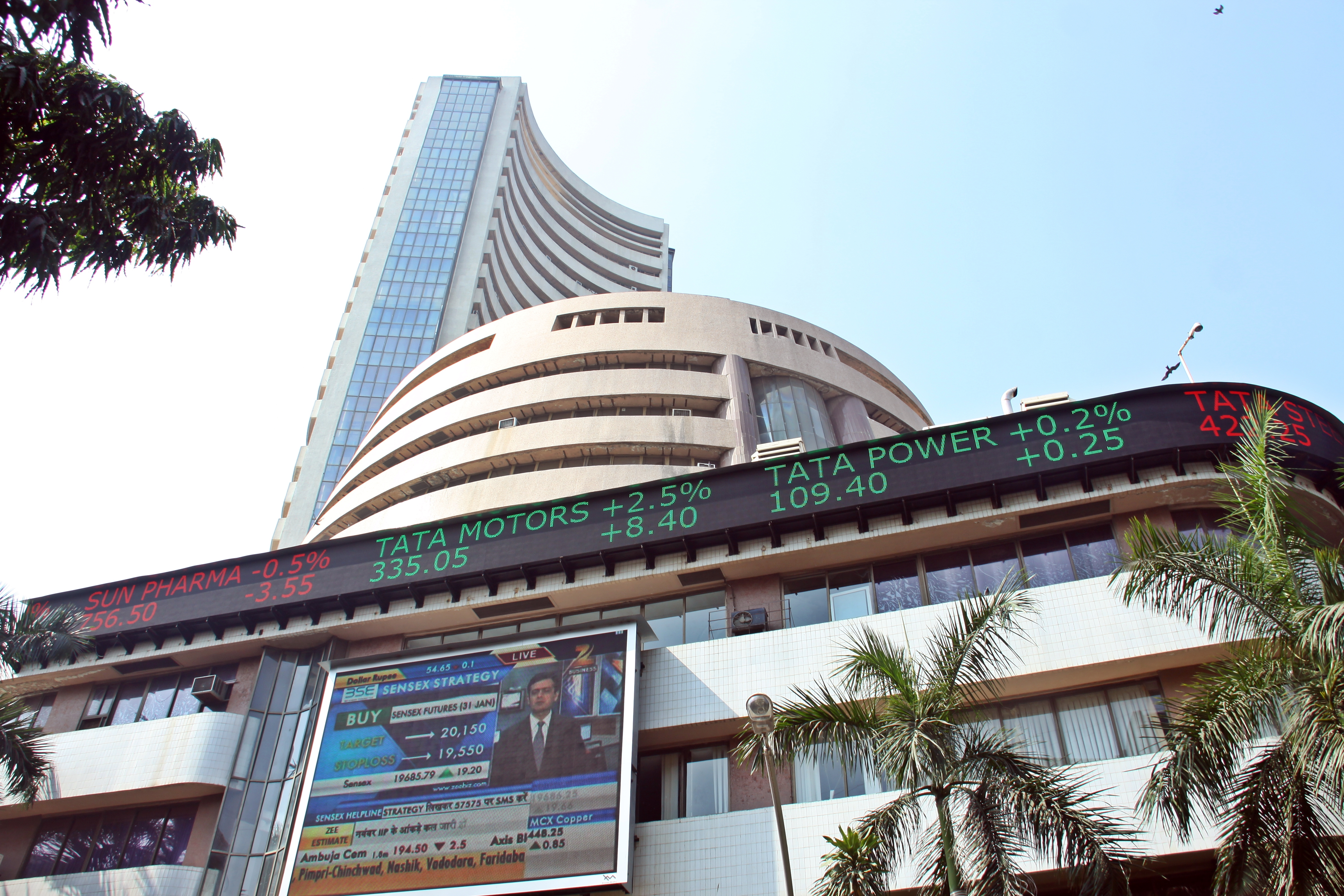
- Corporate headquarters in Mumbai
- Type: Stock exchange
- Location: Mumbai, Maharashtra, India
- Coordinates: 18.929681°N 72.833589°E
- Founded: 9 July 1875; 151 years ago by Premchand Roychand
- Key people: Subhasis Chaudhuri (chairman); Sundararaman Ramamurthy (MD and CEO)
- Currency: Indian rupee (₹)
- No. of listings: 5,647
- Market cap: ₹480 lakh crore (US$5.0 trillion) (2 April 2026)
- Indices: BSE SENSEX; BSE 100; BSE 500; BSE MidCap; BSE SmallCap
- Traded as: NSE: BSE
- ISIN: INE118H01017
- Headquarters: Mumbai
- Revenue: ▲₹3,236 crore (US$340 million) (2025)
- Net income: ▲₹1,322 crore (US$140 million) (2025)
- Website: www.bseindia.com
- Footnotes; Financials as of 31 March 2025.

Bombay Stock Exchange (BSE Limited), is an Indian stock exchange based in Mumbai. Established in 1875, it is the oldest stock exchange in Asia, and also the tenth oldest in the world.

On 3 February 2017, BSE Ltd. was listed on the National Stock Exchange (NSE). As of 2026, BSE ranks among the top ten largest publicly traded stock exchange operators globally by market capitalization.

== History ==
Bombay Stock Exchange logo used until June 2023

=== Origins and informal trading (1850s–1874) ===
In the 1850s, stock trading in Bombay was conducted informally by a small group of five brokers—four Gujarati and one Parsi—who gathered under a banyan tree in front of the Bombay Town Hall. As the number of brokers increased over the following decade, the group frequently relocated to accommodate their growing size, eventually settling under the banyan trees at the junction of Meadows Street and Esplanade Road (now Mahatma Gandhi Road).

=== Formalization and Dalal Street (1875–1900s) ===
By 1874, the rapidly expanding broker network required a permanent headquarters and a standardized regulatory structure. In 1875, the prominent Śvetāmbara Jain financier and businessman Premchand Roychand organized the brokers into an official institution. Roychand, who had amassed a vast fortune as the "Cotton King" and "Bullion King" of Bombay, provided the structural leadership to establish "The Native Share & Stock Brokers Association." His intervention effectively transitioned the decentralized street traders into Asia's first official stock exchange. With his backing, the association acquired a permanent location in 1899, which subsequently became known globally as Dalal Street.

=== Government recognition and modernization (1957–1990s) ===
Following Indian independence, the institution's regulatory framework was formally integrated into the national economy. In 1957, the BSE became the first stock exchange to be officially recognized by the Government of India under the Securities Contracts (Regulation) Act, 1956.

In March 1995, BSE introduced its BSE On-Line Trading (BOLT) system, replacing open-outcry trading with screen-based electronic trading. The system enabled automated securities trading nationwide and was intended to improve transparency, settlement cycles and back-office efficiency.

=== Corporatization and global integration (2000s–present) ===
The 21st century marked significant structural changes for the exchange. Pursuant to the BSE (Corporatisation and Demutualisation) Scheme, 2005 notified by Securities and Exchange Board of India (SEBI), the exchange was officially demutualized and corporatized on 19 May 2007. The BSE subsequently expanded its global footprint by joining the United Nations Sustainable Stock Exchanges Initiative as a Partner Exchange in September 2012. On 30 December 2016, the BSE established the India International Exchange (India INX), the country's first international stock exchange, based out of GIFT City. The exchange further diversified its market offerings by launching the country's first commodity derivative contracts in gold and silver in October 2018.

BSE Limited listed on the National Stock Exchange (NSE) on 3 February 2017 under the ticker symbol of "BSE". (Note: SEBI Regulation 45(1) of Securities Contracts (Regulation) (Stock Exchanges and Clearing Corporations) Regulations, 2018 prohibits self-listing of a stock exchange in India.)

As of 2026, BSE Limited ranks as the tenth largest publicly traded stock exchange operator in the world by market capitalization, with a valuation of over ₹1.39 lakh crore.

== Criticism and controversies ==
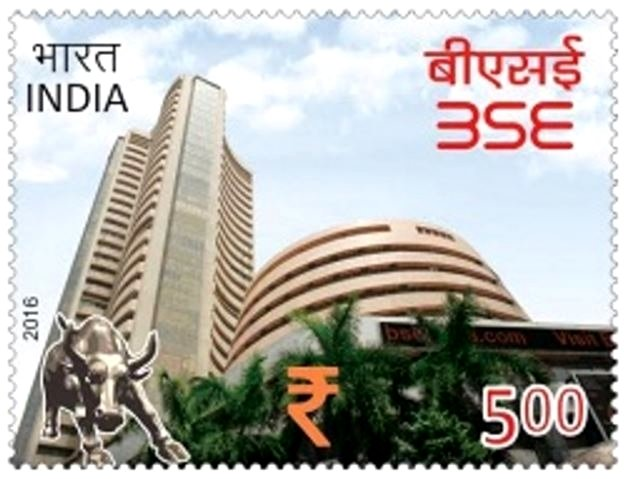
Stamp of India 2016 Bombay Stock Exchange

BSE has witnessed several high-profile market manipulation scandals. At times, the Securities and Exchange Board of India (SEBI) has barred several individuals and entities from trading on the exchanges for insider trading and stock manipulation, especially in illiquid small-caps and penny stocks.

The BSE faced criticism during the early 2000s for delayed technology upgrades, which contributed to its competitor NSE gaining market dominance in electronic trading. In 2013, market participants raised concerns over alleged preferential access to BSE's trading systems, prompting calls for improved transparency and oversight, though no regulatory action followed.

== See also ==
- Economy of India
- List of stock exchanges
- National Stock Exchange of India
- Stock market crashes in India
- Mutual funds in India
- Muhurat trading
- Clause 49
- Securities and Exchange Board of India
