= Sindhi Hindus =

Sindhi adherents of Hinduism

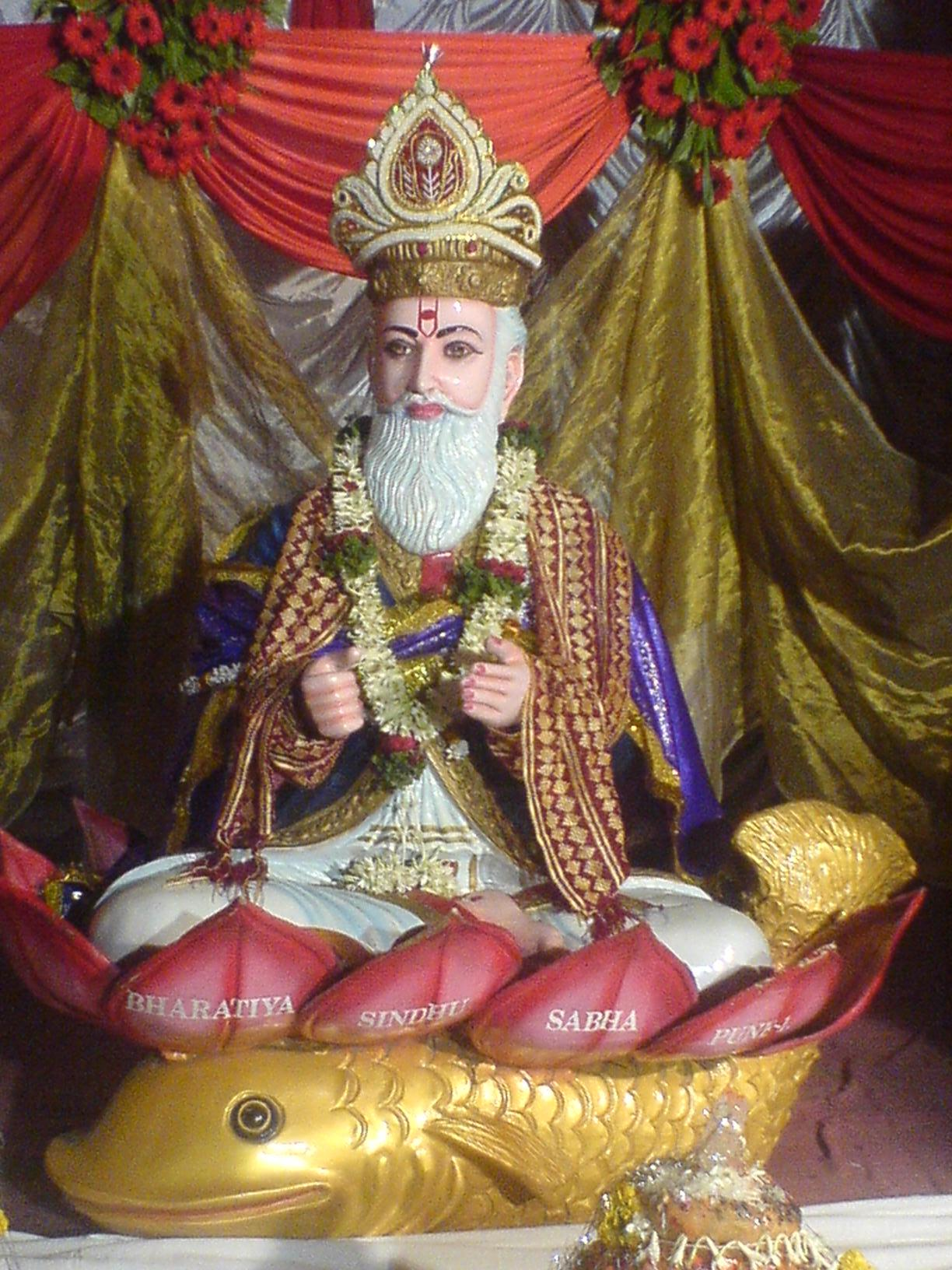
- Jhulelal (Varuna), the popular deity of the Sindhi Hindus.

Total population
- c. 7.5 million

Regions with significant populations
- Pakistan: 4,901,407 (2023)
- India: 2,772,264 (2011) (Note: All speakers of the Sindhi language in India. Many ethnic Sindhis in India no longer speak the language.)

Religions
- Hinduism

Languages
- Sindhi; Additionally Hindi-Urdu, Kutchi, Gujarati, Rajasthani, and English

Sindhi Hindus are ethnic Sindhis who practice Hinduism. They are spread across modern-day Sindh province in Pakistan and across India. After the partition of India in 1947, many Sindhi Hindus were among those who fled from Pakistan to the Dominion of India, in what was a wholesale exchange of Hindu and Muslim populations in some areas. Some later emigrated from the Indian subcontinent and settled in other parts of the world.

According to the 2023 census, there are 4.9 million Sindhi Hindus residing within the Sindh province of Pakistan with major population centres being Mirpur Khas Division and Hyderabad Division that combined account for more than 2 million of them. Meanwhile, the 2011 census listed 2.77 million speakers of Sindhi in India, a number that does not include Sindhi Hindus who no longer speak the Sindhi language. The vast majority of Sindhi Hindus living in India belong to the Lohana jāti, which includes the sub-groups of Amil, Bhaiband and Sahiti.

== History of Hinduism in Sindh ==
=== Before the Arab invasions ===
Prior to Arab invasions, majority of Sindh's population practiced majorly Hinduism. During the Arab invasions, majority of Sindhi Hindus were a rural pastoral population, who lived mostly in upper Sindh, a region that was entirely Hindu; while the Buddhists of Sindh were a mercantile population, who lived entirely in the urban areas of lower Sindh.

=== Arab rule ===
After many successful raids, collaboration by the local Buddhist population, and resistance by the local Hindu population, the army of the Umayyad Caliphate led by Muhammad Bin Qasim successfully invaded and conquered Sindh in 712 CE, against the last Hindu king of Sindh, Raja Dahir.

Sindh, under the control of Qasim, saw a decline of Buddhism, as most Buddhists started converting to Islam. The later reign of the Delhi Sultanate, led to further decline, with both Hinduism and Buddhism becoming minority religions in Sindh. Buddhism later collapsed and ceased to exist in Sindh, while Hinduism remained persistent, managing to survive and flourish throughout the centuries as a minority religion. The consistency of Hinduism in Sindh is attributed to the dependency of the rural Hindu population on intra-regional commerce and flexibility to adapt to altered circumstances.

=== Partition and after ===
Prior to the partition of India, as per the 1941 census, the Sindhi Hindu population accounted for around 27% of Sindh's population, most of whom moved to India. Today, Sindhi Hindus in Pakistan number around 4.2 million, around 9% of the region's population. Sindhi Hindus are the largest ethnolinguistic Hindu group in Pakistan. Those remaining in Pakistan face religious persecution and discrimination. Reports cite instances of violence against Sindhi Hindus, unequal economic opportunities, and the forced conversion of women to Islam. These conditions have caused continued mass migration and created a significant refugee population, with activists often criticizing the state's failure to address these violations.

== Religious syncretism with Islam and Sikhism ==
Historically, Sindhi Hindus have embraced forms of religious syncretism, as a large proportion of the Sindhi Hindus have been close to Islam through revering Sufi saints at Sufi shrines as well close to Sikhism through the Nanakpanthi, an approach in which Guru Nanak's teachings are respected but without necessarily following the other gurus nor identifying as Sikhs.

== Groups and communities ==
Majority of Sindhi Hindus belong to Lohana community who are historically traders, merchants and government officials, The Sindhi Lohanas are divided into different sub-groups for example Amils, Bhaibands, Hyderabadi Bhaiband (Sindhi Varki), Sahitis, Shikarpuris, Hatvaniya/Hatwara, Thattai, Bhagnari etc, these sub-groups have their own hundreds of surnames/castes. Other communities are Bhatia (Larai and Utradi), Arora and small Shikarpuri Khatris, all of them are called as Wāniya and Deewān in Sindh and belong to Waishya Varna of Hinduism. There are also few Sindhi Brahmins for example Pokarno and Sarsat or Sarsudh.

Hindu Rajputs are mainly found in Thar region. The tribal groups like Dhed, Bhils, Meghwars, Kolhis etc form second largest group among Sindhi Hindus and are mostly found in Southeast of Sindh. The Sindhi Hindus do not have caste based division nor the concept of higher caste or lower caste, there is no evil of untouchability.

== Sindhi Hindus in India ==
=== Partition ===
During the first half of 1948, approximately 1 million Sindhi Hindus immigrated to India. Various refugee colonies have been set up by Government of India for accommodation of Sindhi refugees across the nation like: Ahmedabad, Gandhidham, Kandla and Adipur camps in Gujarat, Sindhi Camp bus stand in Rajasthan's capital Jaipur, Cox Town camp in Karnataka's capital Bangalore and Ulhasnagar (Kalyan Camp) in Maharashtra.

=== Contemporary situation ===
According to the 2011 Census of India, there are around 2.8 million Sindhi-language speakers living in India, however, this number does not include ethnic Sindhis who no longer speak Sindhi. Sindhis formed a major-chunk of population of Ulhasnagar Municipality (Mumbai Metropolitan Region), Maharashtra. The population of Ulhasnagar city is 500k, out of which 400k of the residents are Sindhis, thus constituting 80% of the city's population as per 2011 census report. Ulhasnagar is also known as India's "Mini Sindh" due to having the highest concentration of Sindhis in one city in India.

== Family names ==
=== Conventions ===
Most Sindhi Hindu family names are a modified form of a patronymic and typically end with the suffix "-ani", which is used to denote descent from a common male ancestor. One explanation states that the -ani suffix is a Sindhi variant of 'anshi', derived from the Sanskrit word 'ansh', which means 'descended from' (see: Devanshi). The first part of a Sindhi Hindu surname is usually derived from the name or location of an ancestor. In northern Sindh, surnames ending in 'ja' (meaning 'of') are also common. A person's surname would consist of the name of his or her native village, followed by 'ja'. The Sindhi Hindus generally add the suffix ‘-ani’ to the name of a great-grandfather and adopt the name as a family name.

=== Surnames ===
Caste	Surnames
Sindhi Amil Lohana	Advani, Ahuja, Ajwani, Bathija, Bhambhani, Bhavnani, Bijlani, Chanchalani, Chhablani, Chhabira, Chhugani, Chugani, Dadlani, Daryani, Dudani, Essarani, Gabrani, Gidwani, Gurnani, Hingorani, Hemrajani , Idnani, Issrani, Jagtiani, Jaisinghani, Jhangiani, Kandharani, Karnani, Kewalramani, Kewlani, Khubchandani, Kriplani, Haswani,Hiranandani, Lalwani, Lalchandani, Mahtani, Makhija, Malkani, Manghirmalani, Manglani, Manshani, Mansukhani, Mirchandani, Motwani, Mukhija, Panjwani, Punwani, Ramchandani, Raisinghani, Rijhsanghani, Rohira, Sadarangani, Shahani, Shahukarani, Shivdasani, Sipahimalani (shortened to Sippy in many instances), Sitlani, Sarabhai, Singhania, Takthani, Thadani, Tanwani, Vaswani, Wadhwani and Uttamsinghani
Sindhi Bhaiband Lohana	Aishani, Agahni, Anandani, Aneja, Ambwani, Asija, Bablani, Bajaj, Bhagwani, Bhaglani, Bhojwani, Bhagnani, Balani, Baharwani, Biyani, Bodhani, Chandiramani, Channa, Chattani, Chothani, Chughani, Dalwani, Damani, Devnani, Dhingria, Dolani, Dudeja, Gangwani, Ganglani, Gulrajani, Hotwani, Harwani, Jagwani, Jamtani, Jobanputra, Juneja, Jumani, Kateja, Kodwani, Khabrani, Khanchandani, Khushalani, Kirpalani, Lakhani, Lanjwani, Longan, Lachhwani, Ludhwani, Lulia, Lokwani, Manghnani, Mamtani, Melwani, Mirani, Mirpuri, Mirwani, Mohinani, Mulchandani, Nihalani, Nankani, Nathani, Parwani, Phull, Qaimkhani, Ratlani, Rajpal, Rustamani, Ruprela, Rajwani, Rijhwani, Ramnani, Sambhavani, Santdasani, Shamdasani, Soneji, Setia, Sewani, Tejwani, Tilokani, Tirthani, Wassan, Vangani, Varlani, Vishnani, Visrani, Virwani and Valbani

== Notable Sindhi Hindus ==
- Bherumal Meharchand Advani, linguist, historian, novelist, poet, researcher
- Kalyan Bulchand Advani, poet, critique, scholar
- Kiara Advani, Indian actress
- L. K. Advani, former Deputy Prime Minister of India
- Nikkhil Advani, Indian movie director and screenwriter
- Pankaj Advani, 23 times world champion in snooker and billiards from India.
- Suresh H. Advani, oncologist who pioneered Hematopoietic stem cell transplantation in India
- Asrani, Indian comedian and actor
- Kirat Babani, freedom fighter, writer, journalist
- Babita, Indian film actress
- Anant Balani, Indian film director
- Rana Bhagwandas, Judge on the Supreme Court of Pakistan
- Tamannaah Bhatia, Indian actress
- Deepak Bhojwani, Indian diplomat
- Aarti Chabria, actress
- Brahma Chellaney, geostrategist and author
- Vishal Dadlani, playback singer
- Jairamdas Daulatram, political leader in the Indian independence movement, Governor of the Indian states of Bihar and later Assam
- Raja Dahir, the last Hindu king of Sindh
- Bhai Pratap Dialdas, freedom fighter, businessman, philanthropist
- Harish Fabiani, Indian (NRI) businessman based in Madrid
- Khialdas Fani, writer, poet, singer
- Sobho Gianchandani, Pakistani Sindhi social scientist, and revolutionary writer
- Gope, full name Gope Kamlani, actor in Hindi cinema
- Hotchand Molchand Gurbakhshani, Educationist, Scholar and Writer
- Hari Harilela, Indian businessman based in Hong Kong
- Jimmi Harkishin, British Asian actor
- Anita Hassanandani, Indian actress
- Gopichand Hinduja, British businessman, co-chairman of the Hinduja Group
- Indira Hinduja, Indian gynaecologist, obstetrician and infertility specialist who pioneered the Gamete intrafallopian transfer (GIFT) technique
- Gulab Mohanlal Hiranandani, Indian Navy officer who served as the Vice Chief of the Naval Staff
- Lakhumal Hiranand Hiranandani, Indian Otorhinolaryngologist
- Niranjan Hiranandani, co-founder and managing director of Hiranandani Group
- Popati Hiranandani, writer
- Surendra Hiranandani, co-founder and managing director of Hiranandani Group
- Rajkumar Hirani, popular Indian film director and editor
- Narendra Hirwani, Indian cricketer
- Micky Jagtiani, chairman and owner of Landmark Group
- Dr Gurmukh Das Jagwani, former Member of Maharashtra Legislative Council
- Jeet, Indian actor
- Kamna Jethmalani, Indian actress
- Ram Jethmalani, Indian senior lawyer, former Law Minister of India
- Motilal Jotwani, Indian writer, educator, follower of Gandhi, fellow of Harvard Divinity School
- Hemu Kalani, freedom fighter
- Atul Khatri, stand-up comedian
- Chanda Kochhar (née Advani), Former MD and chief executive officer of ICICI Bank
- Krishna Kohli, Senator, Pakistan Peoples Party
- Rooplo Kolhi, freedom fighter
- J. B. Kripalani, freedom fighter and President of Indian National Congress
- Jayant Kripalani, Film, Television and Stage actor
- Krishna Kripalani, freedom fighter, author and parliamentarian
- Ajith Kumar, Indian film actor
- Gulu Lalvani, chairman of Binatone
- Kartar Lalvani, founder and chairman of Vitabiotics
- Nikita Lalwani, Indian novelist based in London
- Tej Lalvani, CEO of the UK's largest vitamin company Vitabiotics
- Shankar Lalwani, Indian politician and Member of Parliament in the 17th Lok Sabha from Indore, Madhya Pradesh, India.
- Kishore Mahbubani, Singaporean diplomat
- Vivek Mahbubani, Hong Kong comedian
- K. R. Malkani, journalist, historian and politician
- Mangharam Udharam Malkani, Sindhi scholar, critic, writer, playwright, literary historian and professor
- N. R. Malkani, freedom fighter and social worker
- Rajeev Masand, Indian film critic
- Rajesh Mirchandani, global communications leader and former British television journalist
- Hansika Motwani, Indian actress
- Rajeev Motwani, computer scientist, Professor at Stanford University, He was an early supporter and advisor of companies like Google and PayPal
- Kabir Mulchandani, Indian businessman
- Seth Vishandas Nihalchand, merchant and former member of Indian National Congress at the time of Independence
- Archana Panjabi, British actress
- Lila Poonawalla (née Thadani), Indian industrialist, philanthropist, humanitarian and the founder of Lila Poonawalla Foundation
- Kala Prakash, fiction writer
- Moti Prakash, poet
- Chandru Raheja, property developer
- Sushil Rajpal, Indian cameraman, producer, director
- Bhagat Kanwar Ram, saint
- Bulo C Rani, Indian music director
- Gulabrai Ramchand, Indian cricketer
- Ishwardas Rohani, Indian politician and former Speaker of Madhya Pradesh Legislative Assembly
- Aryan Rohira, Sindhi-American Entrepreneur, Bollywood DJ, and published academic
- G. S. Sainani, Indian general physician, medical researcher, medical writer and an Emeritus Professor of the National Academy of Medical Sciences
- Meera Sanyal (née Hiranandani), was an Indian banker and politician. She served as CEO and chairperson of the Royal Bank of Scotland in India
- Aftab Shivdasani, Indian film actor
- Hari Shivdasani, film director and actor
- Sadhana Shivdasani, Indian film actress
- Sonu Shivdasani, founder and CEO of Soneva
- Ranveer Singh, Indian actor
- G. P. Sippy, Bollywood movie producer and director
- Ramesh Sippy, Bollywood movie producer and director
- Sobhraj Nirmaldas Sujansingani, writer and poet
- Anjana Sukhani, actress
- Dalip Tahil Indian film, television and theatre actor
- Radhakrishna Hariram Tahiliani, Former Chief of the Naval Staff, India
- Tarun Tahiliani, Indian fashion designer
- Hiten Tejwani, Indian actor
- Sundri Uttamchandani, Indian writer
- Ashish Vaswani, ex computer scientist with Google Brain, introduced Transformer neural network architecture, ceo of Essential.ai
- Chunky Vazirani, Founder of vazirani-automotive.com
- Sunil Vaswani, chairman of the Stallion Group
- Harchandrai Vishandas, British Indian attorney, politician and former mayor of Karachi
- Romesh Wadhwani, chairman and CEO of Symphony Technology Group (STG), an alumnus of Indian Institute of Technology Bombay
- Sudhir, Film Actor
- Tulsi Ramsey, filmmaker
- Shyam Ramsey, filmmaker
- F U Ramsay, filmmaker
- Kumar Ramsay, filmmaker
- Arjun Ramsay, filmmaker
- Keshu Ramsay, filmmaker
- Kiran Ramsay, filmmaker
- Ramchand Bhavnani, investor
- Mac Mohan, film actor
- Raj Kiran, film actor
- Shiela Ramani, film actor
- Govind Nihalani, filmmaker
- Pahalaj Nihalani, filmmaker
- Arjun Hingorani, filmmaker
- Bhagwanti Navani, singer
- Master Chandur, singer

== See also ==
- Sindhis
- Hinduism in Sindh Province
- Sindhis in India
- Hinduism in Pakistan
- Darya Lal Mandir

== Sources ==
- Bherumal Mahirchand Advani, "Amilan-jo-Ahwal" - published in Sindhi, 1919
- Amilan-jo-Ahwal (1919) - translated into English in 2016 ("A History of the Amils") at sindhis
