= Lalvani =

Lalvani is a surname. Notable people with the surname include:

- Gulu Lalvani (born 1939), British businessman
- Dino Lalvani (born 1973), British businessman
- Kartar Lalvani (born 1931), British businessman, brother of Gulu
- Tej Lalvani (born 1974), British businessman

== See also ==
- Lalwani
