= University College of Engineering and Technology =

University College of Engineering and Technology, Bikaner may refer to:

University College of Engineering and Technology (UCET), previously known as Govt. College of Engineering and Technology, is an autonomous institution of the Government of Rajasthan and a constituent college of Bikaner Technical University. eecc

UCET Bikaner became a constituent college of Bikaner Technical University (BTU) since August 2018, as per gazette notification, as enunciated in the BTU Act, 2018.

- University College of Engineering and Technology, Bikaner, Rajasthan, India

Undergraduate (B.Tech):

Ceramic Engineering Civil Engineering Computer Science & Engineering Electronics and Communication Engineering Electrical Engineering Mechanical Engineering

Intake Seats:

CSE: 120 + 6 TFWS All other B.Tech branches: 60 + 3 TFWS each MBA: 60 seats

Admission

B.Tech admission is offered in 6 disciplines. Candidates are required to appear for JEE Main and admission is processed through REAP (Rajasthan Engineering Admission Process). MBA admission requires a bachelor’s degree with 50% marks from a recognized university. careers360

Campus & Facilities

The campus provides facilities including library, hostel, laboratories, sports complex, transport, cafeteria, medical support, and Wi-Fi. admistay

Events

Various clubs are there for students, and Rissonanza — a Techno-Cultural-Sports Fest — is organised annually.

== See also ==
- University College of Engineering (disambiguation)
