= Mirchandani =

Mirchandani is a surname of Indian origin, commonly used by Sindhi Hindus. Notable people with the surname include:

- Kamna Mirchandani (born 1979), Indian-born Canadian cricketer
- Lidia Mirchandani (born 1976), Spanish basketball player
- Nanikram Dharamdas Mirchandani (1890–1946), Sindhi novelist, essayist, and actor-dramatist
- Rajesh Mirchandani, British communications executive and former television journalist of Indian Sindhi descent
- Rohan Mirchandani (1981 or 1982–2024), Indian businessman and entrepreneur
- Sanjay Mirchandani, President & Chief Executive Officer of Commvault
