= Biyani Group of Colleges =

Educational institutes in Jaipur, India

Coordinates: 26.9566266°N 75.7768861°E

Biyani Colleges (BGC)
- Motto: Where you can trust
- Type: Not-for-profit Private
- Established: 1997
- Affiliations: University of Rajasthan, Rajasthan Technical University and All India Council for Technical Education
- Chairman: Sh. Rajeev Biyani
- Director: Prof. Sanjay Biyani
- Head: Smt. Pushpa Biyani
- Location: Jaipur, Rajasthan, India
- Newspaper: Biyani Times
- Website: www.biyanicolleges.org

Biyani Group of Colleges is a group of educational institutes in Jaipur, Rajasthan, India. The college is run by the trust Biyani Shikshan Samiti, a non-profit organization working for improvement of women's education in the Indian state of Rajasthan. The trust has established three campuses in Jaipur.

== History ==
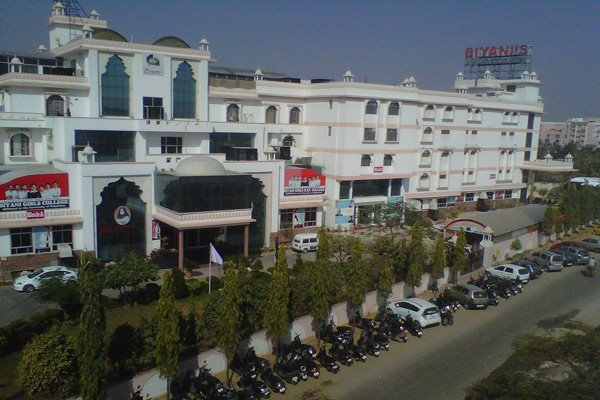
Biyani College campus, Vidyadhar Nagar, jaipur

Biyani Shikshan Samiti was formed by Rajeev Biyani, Sanjay Biyani and Manish Biyani in 2007 to improve women's education in the Indian state of Rajasthan.

== Campuses ==
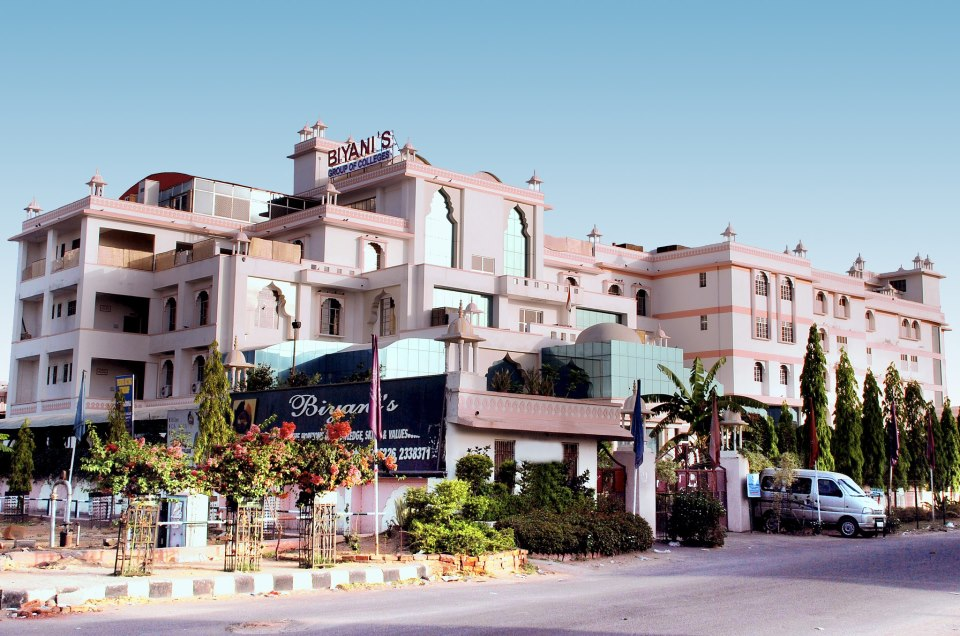
Biyani Group of Colleges

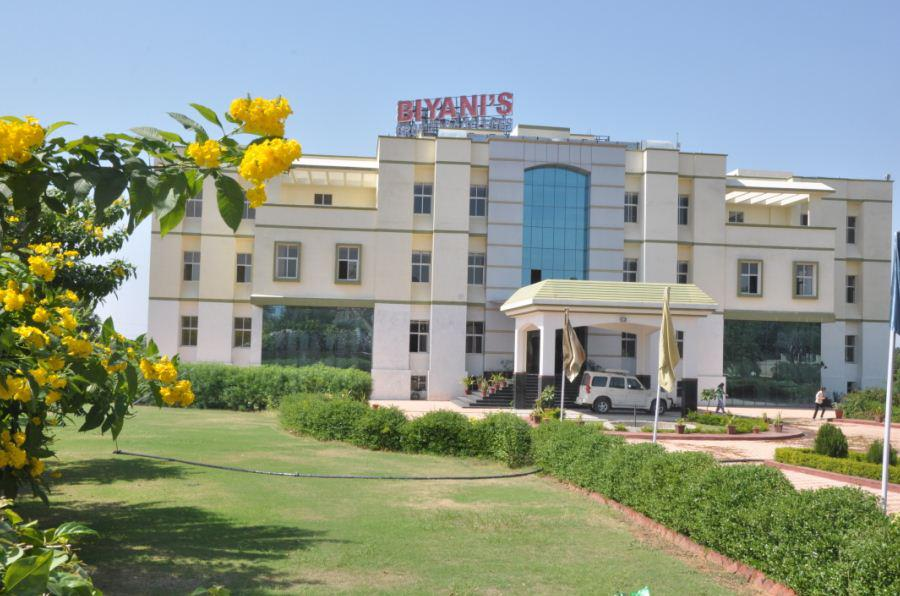
Biyani Engineering Campus, Kalwar, Jaipur

The Biyani Group of Colleges has three campuses: one in Vidhyadhar Nagar, Jaipur, Second one at Champapura, Jaipur and third at Kalwar, Jaipur, Rajasthan.

== Administration and organization ==
- Mr. Rajeev Biyani is the Chairman of Biyani Group of Colleges.
- Prof. Sanjay Biyani is the Academic Director of Biyani Group of Colleges. He has a doctorate from the University of Rajasthan, Jaipur on "Analysis of Financial Statement and Accounting Standards". He is also founder of GuruKPO.com, an online free educational organization.
- Dr. Manish Biyani is the R&D Director. His major areas of research interest are evolutionary molecular engineering, molecular diagnostics, Bio-drug discovery, DNA-based nanoarchitecture, and biochips. A double graduate in Science and Pharmacy, Dr. Manish Biyani received his M.E. in Genetic Engineering and Ph.D. in Biophysics from Japan. He is the Executive Body Member of the Indian Scientists Association in Japan where he works to promote scientific interaction and research networks between India and Japan.

== Recognition ==
Biyani Girls College and Biyani College of Science and Management, Kalwar are affiliated with the University of Rajasthan — Accredited A+ (A Plus) by the National Assessment and Accreditation Council, India. Biyani Group's Biyani International Institute of Engineering & Technology is affiliated with Rajasthan Technical University, Kota and Department of Education, Rajasthan Government and approved by the All India Council for Technical Education.

=== Colleges ===
- Biyani Girls College (for girls)
- Biyani Institute of Science and Management (for girls)
- Biyani Girls B.Ed. College
- Biyani School of Nursing & Para-Medical Science (for girls)
- Biyani International Institute of Engineering & Technology
- Biyani College of Science and Management (co-ed)
- Biyani Law College (co-ed)
- Biyani Institute of Pharmaceutical Sciences (co-ed)

=== Education system ===
Regular courses of graduate and postgraduate level.

== Student life ==
Both the campuses of Biyani colleges are semi-residential. Students have the option to live in a hostel.
