= Biyani =

Biyani is a surname. Notable people carrying the name include:

- Brijlal Biyani (1896–1968), Indian independence activist and writer
- Gagan Biyani (born 1987), Indian American entrepreneur, marketer and journalist
- Kishore Biyani, Indian businessman
- Sanjay Biyani, Indian Educationist

== See also ==
- Biyani Group of Colleges
  - Biyani Institute of Science and Management for Girls
  - Biyani International Institute of Engineering & Technology
- Biyani Family, a fictional family in the Indian TV series Badii Devrani
- Biryani
