= Semiramis (disambiguation) =

Semiramis was the legendary queen of King Ninus who succeeded him to the throne of Assyria.

Semiramis or Sémiramis may also refer to:

- 584 Semiramis, a minor planet
- Sémiramis (tragedy), a play by Voltaire
- Semiramis (band), an Italian progressive rock group
- Sémiramis (Catel), an 1802 opera by Charles-Simon Catel
- Sémiramis (Destouches), an opera by André Cardinal Destouches
- Semiramis Hotel in Cairo
- Semiramis Hotel bombing a terrorist attack resulting in 25-26 deaths.
- Semiramis Pekkan (b. 1948), a Turkish singer and actress
- HMS Semiramis (1808), a British warship launched in 1808

== See also ==
- Semiramide
- Semiramide (Mysliveček)
