= Seth Vishandas Nihalchand =

Politician, social reformer, and philanthropist

Vishandas Nihalchand
- Born: 1843; Manjhu, Kingdom of Sindh (Present day: Manjhu, Jamshoro District, Sindh, Pakistan)
- Died: 1929 (aged 85–86); Hyderabad (Sindh), Bombay Presidency, British India (Present day: Hyderabad, Sindh, Pakistan)
- Occupations: Commerce, politics, social work, businessperson

Vishandas Nihalchand (1843-1929) was a Sindhi Hindu politician, social reformer, and philanthropist. He belonged to a merchant-landowner bhavnani family settled in Sindh of British India. Seth Vishandas established many cotton ginning and rice threshing factories in different areas of Sindh, such as Manjhu, Hyderabad, Nawabshah, Dadu and Badin. He also was involved with Sindh political and social services.

== Early life ==
=== Birth and education ===
Seth Vishandas was born in Manjhu, a village in Tehsil Kotri, Sindh of Talpur dynasty in 1843 AD, one month before the invasion of Sindh and annexation to British India. He was full-blooded Sindhi, as his father and mother both were of Sindhi origin.

When he was 18 years old, he left his family home to seek a teacher. He walked all the way from Sindh to Punjab, and near Lahore, he found a famous saint called Gulabdas who became his guru for many years.

=== Family ===
Seth Vishandas's father was Seth Nihalchand Lakhmichand of Manjhu, who was born in 1798 and died in 1865. Vishandas had one brother, Lilaram.

Seth Vishandas married Beejhalbai, the daughter of Seth Dunimal Tilokchandani, a businessman from Manjhand. The couple had three sons: the eldest, Seth Harchandrai Vishandas, was a lawyer and famous politician who became known as the “father of modern Karachi.“ Seth Udhavdas Vishandas, the second son, was born in Manjhu in 1896, took on the family business as a landlord and cotton merchant, and died in his hometown in 1926. Seth Srichand was the third son. Vishandas also had four daughters: Gungalbhai, Panjalbai, Motibai, and Chandibai.

== Professional life ==
=== Mercantile background ===
Seth Vishandas owned vast lands and commerce, which after successful management, made him one of the wealthiest men in Sindh. Along with being a landlord and managing cotton and rice factories, he was also a large-scale timber contractor who allowed the poor to sell wood from his land to make a living. Vishandas was also known to permit low-income cattle owners to graze their cattle on his land.

=== Local and political affairs ===
He attended the first, second, and third sessions of Indian National Congress. The 28th session of Congress in 1913 was held in Karachi largely due efforts of Vishandas, his son Harchandrai, and Ghulam Mohamed Bhurgari. He and Harchandrai served respectively as chairman and Secretary of the reception committee during that session. Vishandas was a member of the Karachi District Local Board and the president of Kotri Tehsil Local Board until his death.

=== Social reformer ===
Vishandas opposed the injustices within the Deti-Leti system long before any official reform was attempted or enacted. He wrote a book promoting a radical cure for this societal ill and sent a free copy to various Panchayats. He then traveled from village to village, town to town, instructing Panchayats and seeking to educate the public about why and how reform should be instituted.

Vishandas's ideas and efforts were part of the pre-independence pioneering movement toward the abolition of the dowry system. A decade following Vishandas's death, the then-provincial government of Sindh passed an enactment known as the Sind Deti Leti Act of 1939, which was the earliest official attempt to bring an end to the evils within dowry system. While this early enactment was unable to achieve the desired impact, as were other similar failed Deti Leti reform attempts of the 1950s, it sparked a gradual movement that finally culminated in India's Dowry Prohibition Act of 1961.

Vishandas also is remembered for being a proponent of education and investing in the betterment of the communities in which he lived. He built a library in Kotri and founded schools in Manjhu, his place of birth, and in Hyderabad, where he had taken up residential quarters (known as Vishin Nagar). He also established a hospital, Rest house, and grain shop in Hyderabad.

In credit of his role as a social reformer, Vishandas was conferred with the title of Rai Bahadur.

== Death ==
Afflicted by asthma complications, Seth Vishandas died in 1929 in Hyderabad, Sindh. Two of his sons died during his lifetime, Harchandrai in 1928 and Udhavdas in 1926. Three years after his death, his third son Srichand died in 1932. Vishandas left behind over 8,000 acres of land and two huge ginning factories, which were distributed equally among his sons and grandchildren.
