= Jitendra Vaswani =

Indian SEO specialist and digital marketing consultant

- Education: Rajasthan Technical University
- Occupations: AI SEO expert; Blogger; Author; Entrepreneur
- Known for: BloggersIdeas and Digiexe

Jitendra Vaswani in Jaipur, Rajasthan, India. He is an Indian SEO specialist and digital marketing consultant (focusing on AI search and GEO); a blogger; an author; and an entrepreneur who is best known as the founder of the digital marketing blog BloggersIdeas and the CEO of the digital marketing agency DigiExe. He has also worked as a digital nomad and travelled many nations for his work.

== Early life and education ==
Vaswani was raised in a middle-class family in Jaipur, where his father worked as a bank employee. He first developed an interest in computers at the age of 14.

Following secondary school, Vaswani pursued an engineering degree from Rajasthan Technical University.

During his college years in 2009, he acquired his first personal laptop and explored computer programming before shifting his focus toward digital marketing.

In his final year of college, he was introduced to Search Engine Optimization (SEO) and began taking on freelance projects through online platforms such as Fiverr and Freelancer.

== Career ==
By 2014, he left his corporate job to pursue blogging full time, scaling a network of multi-niche websites and successfully exiting his early tech blog, TechNoven.com, in a five figure deal.

In July 2026, he acquired Maxzob, a Noida based content marketing and SEO agency.

In October 2026, he built a network of custom bots which is known as Grokbots.

== Achievements ==
He has spoken and conducted digital marketing workshops internationally, including at industry conferences such as Affiliate World. Moreover, according to his interviews, he has conducted training sessions for thousands of marketing professionals globally.

In September 2025, his name listed among the top ten AI SEO Digital Marketers in India.

== Events ==
In February 2026, Vaswani attended the India AI Impact Summit 2026, which was held at Bharat Mandapam, New Delhi.
