= Baldev Ram Mirdha Institute of Technology =

Private research college in India

Coordinates: 18°38′46.48″N 75°56′15″E

BMIT
- Baldev Ram Mirdha Institute of Technology
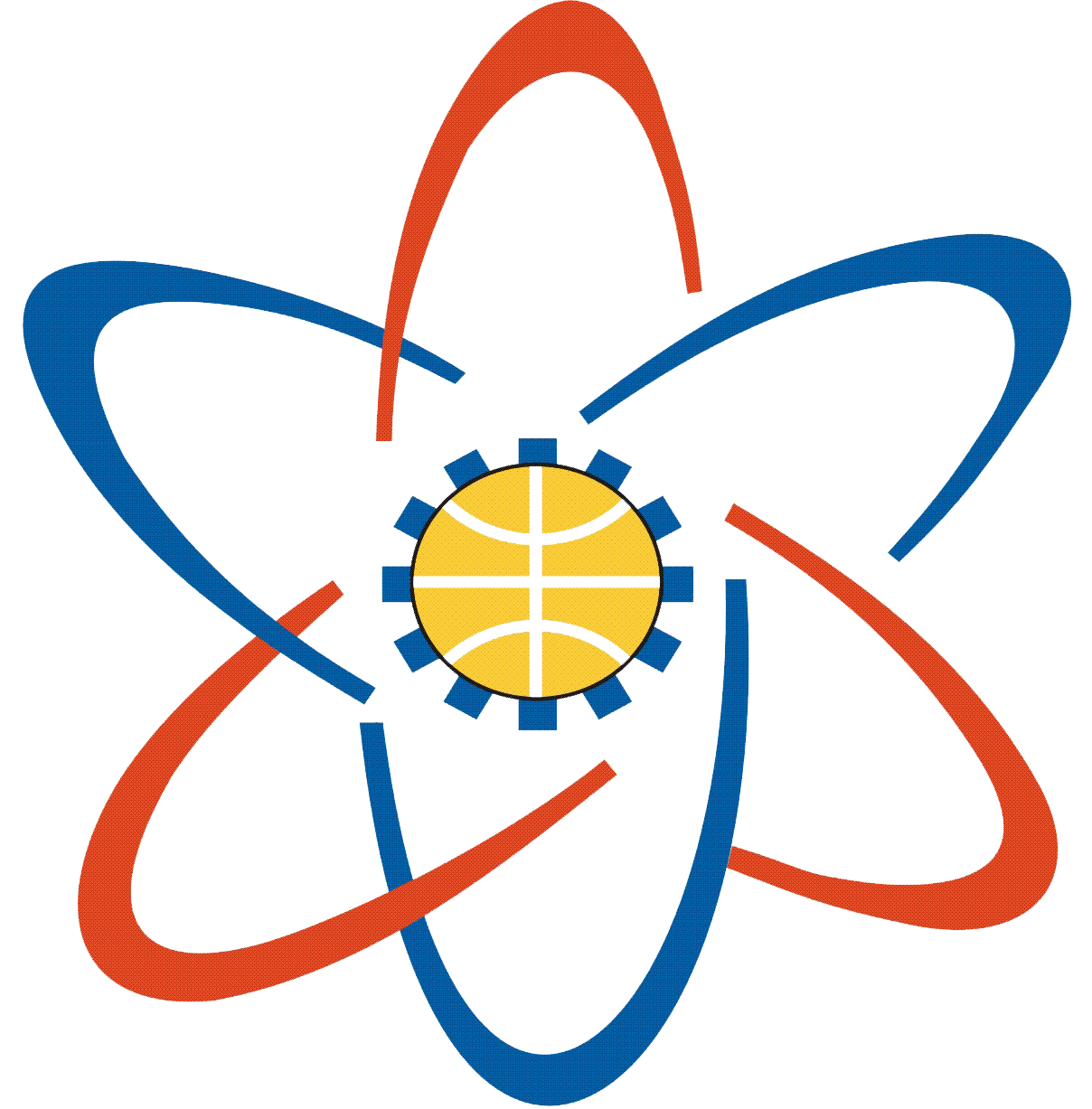
- BMIT, Jaipur
- Motto: Be Somebody
- Type: Private
- Established: 2003
- Principal: Atul Srivastava
- Faculty: 500
- Students: 4000
- Location: Jaipur, Rajasthan, India
- Campus: Suburban, 40,500 sq.m
- Colors: Cardinal red and Royal Blue
- Website: bmitjaipur.org

Baldev Ram Mirdha Institute of Technology, commonly referred to as BMIT, Jaipur, is a private research college located in Jaipur, Rajasthan, India. BMIT is approved by the All India Council for Technical Education and affiliated with the Rajasthan Technical University. It enrolls approximately 3,125 undergraduate and 241 graduate students from India and around the world.

== History ==
It was founded in 2003 by Choudhary Mularam Memorial Educational Society, and named after Baldev Ram Mirdha. BMIT started in a small building constructed in the Sitapura Industrial Area on the outskirts of Jaipur. It had four Bachelor of Engineering streams: [Information Technology], [Computer science], Electronics & Communication, and Electrical. It later added Civil engineering and Mechanical Engineering programs in another campus called BMIT East. It built its East Campus in 2007.

== BMIT Campus ==
- Digital Electronics Lab
- Electronic Measurement and Instrumentation Lab
- Microprocessor Lab
- Communication Lab
- Electrical Lab
- Chemistry Lab
- Physics Lab
- Engineering Workshop
- Computer Hardware Lab
- Microwave Lab
- Electronics Lab
- Electrical Machines Lab
- Power Generation Lab
- Power Systems Lab
- Antenna Lab
- CAD Lab etc...
