= Central Institute of Petrochemicals Engineering and Technology, Jaipur =

Indian research and Technology institute

Central Institute of Petrochemical Engineering and Technology, Jaipur
- Cipet Jaipur
- Established: 2006
- Director: Dr. Syed Amanulla, Mr Sanjay Choudhary
- Location: Jaipur, Rajasthan, India
- Campus: 17.24 acre
- Affiliations: Rajasthan Technical University
- Website: cipet.gov.in

Central Institute of Petrochemical Engineering and Technology, Jaipur (CIPET) is an autonomous higher education and research institute located in Jaipur, India. It was established in 2006 under the aegis of the Ministry of Chemical and Fertilizers, Government of India.

== Location ==
CIPET Jaipur is located on a 17.29-acre campus at SP - 1298, Sitapura Industrial Area, Near Mahatma Gandhi Hospital, Jaipur.

== Courses ==
•B.Tech in Mechanical Engineering

•B.Tech in Plastic Technology

•B.Tech in Petrochemical Engineering

•Diploma in Plastic Technology
