= University Engineering College, Kota =

University Departments, Rajasthan Technical University, Kota
- Motto: Shramev Jayate (Hard Work Always Wins)
- Type: Government
- Established: 1981
- Location: Kota, Rajasthan, India
- Campus: Urban, 385 acres (1.56 km^{2})
- Website: Official website

The Engineering College Kota is an autonomous technical institute in Northern India. It houses the headquarters of Rajasthan Technical University and, hence, is referred as University Department of Rajasthan Technical University (UD-RTU). The institute was established in 1981 by the Government of Rajasthan and was named Engineering College, Kota.

Only the top rankers of [Rajasthan Pre-Engineering Test] (RPET, now RPET has been replaced by REAP (Rajasthan Engineering Admission Process)) get admission to the institution. Admissions are also conducted on the basis of JEE Mains examination.

The students are given theoretical and practical knowledge, enriched by industry oriented training and project works. The institute hosts seminars, symposia, short term courses, many competitions and contests. UD-RTU is one of the best engineering colleges in Northern India.

== Campus ==
UTD-RTU is on the outskirts of Kota on the banks of the Chambal river. The campus is spread over 385 acres (1.56 km^{2}) (the largest campus in Rajasthan) and comprises six academic blocks, lecture theatre building, one administrative block, one library building, one gymnasium, one building for the proctor, training and placement activities, electrical and mechanical workshops, and laboratories.

Campus amenities include canteen shops, bank, post office, dispensary, and shopping center. A gymnasium, three indoor badminton halls, a football ground and a cricket ground are on the campus.

There are five boys and two girls hostels. Brand new hostel buildings were completed in 2017. Residential quarters are provided to faculty members and supporting staff. For visitors, a guest house with kitchen facility has been provided.

== Departments ==
- Management
- Civil Engineering
- Electrical Engineering
- Mechanical Engineering
- Humanities and Applied Sciences
- Computer Science Engineering and Information Technology
- Electronics and Communication Engineering
- Electronics Instrumentation and Control Engineering
- Petroleum Engineering and Petrochemical Engineering
- Aeronautical Engineering
- Production and Industrial Engineering

== Technical activities ==
=== Thar ===
Thar is a grand technical event that takes place at UTD-RTU every year. Colleges across North, West and Central India take part. Thar comprises competitions related to aeromodelling, programming, robotics and robowars, project building, logic and aptitude testing, etc. Event days are followed by Dance Nights when stars come and perform.

=== Student Activity Center (SAC) ===
The SAC focuses on building the technical aptitude of the students by providing guidance and facilities to build exciting and mercurial projects. The SAC conducts all the technical events of the technical event Thar. The various clubs under SAC are:

- Flying Mustangs Club: aeromodelling club
- TechKnights: programming club
- Robotics Club RTU Kota
- TechnoCryptics: Conducts activities for logic and aptitude building
- Master Builders: Civil engineering club
- Society of Automobile Engineers (SAE): Automobile-related projects

Other than these, there are non-technical clubs as well.

- Dance And Drama Club (DND)
- WordsWorth: club which aims at development of communication skills in students
- Institution of Electronics and Telecommunication Engineers (IETE):

The IETE is a professional society devoted to the advancement of the science and technology of electronics, telecommunication and IT. It was founded in the college in 2004. The IETE conducts and sponsors technical meetings, conferences, symposia, and exhibitions all over India, publishes technical journals and provides continuing education as well as career advancement opportunities to its members.

- Industry - Institute Interaction Cell: UCE strives for close interaction and partnership with industry, in projects relevant to local industry
- Indian Society for Technical Education (ISTE): the organization working for the improvement of technical institutions in India. The institute has full-fledged chapter and a student chapter of ISTE. Activities of ISTE chapters include curriculum development, organising seminars, conferences and short term courses on technical developments.

A course on "Finite Element Techniques" have been organised for the teachers of engineering colleges of India.

== Cultural activities ==
=== Anukriti ===
Anukriti is the main cultural event of the institute and is organized annually in February. Students from colleges across India participate in this event.

=== Techlaunch ===
Techlaunch is the annual national level paper and poster presentation. Students from engineering institutes participate. It started in 2005. The event is organised by third- and final-year students. This is generally a three- to five-day-long event.

=== SPIC MACAY ===
SPIC MACAY is a society for the promotion of Indian classical music and culture among youth. A college chapter of SPIC MACAY has run since 1986. It organises concerts and lectures/demonstrations by renowned artists.

== Social activities ==
=== National Service Scheme (NSS) ===
NSS provides students with an opportunity to participate in social and community service activities. Student volunteers have visited the slum dwellers, to educate the illiterate and to help them in understanding the importance of personal hygiene.

=== National Cadet Corps (NCC) ===
The institute has a full-fledged NCC unit namely 14th Raj Bn, NCC Kota and 7RAJ AIR SQN NCC, with Under Officer as company head.

ECK is the only government engineering college to have an NCC with a cadet strength of over 60. Besides regular activities like parades and classes on weekends, NCC conducts welfare activities in the college premises such as tree planting and blood donation. The students of NCC airwing are giving aircraft training and some have done sorties up to five hours in ZenAir microlite.

=== Vivekananda Study Circle (VSC) ===
VSC is a social service society. People from all over India are a part of VSC. Students who are a part, devote their time for the welfare of society. Other than social work, VSC conducts many events which aim for development of the students.

== Achievements ==
- Team Born Idiots of UCE qualified the first round of Imagine cup 2010.
- It is the first university in Rajasthan to get an IBM centre of excellence.

== Placements ==
The institute assists in placement of final-year students. The main recruiters are IT companies, however, other companies visit the campus. Some of the companies are Accenture, Tata Consultancy Services, Infosys Technologies, Tech Mahindra, L&T, Cummins Research and Technology India Limited, Vedanta, Impetus Technologies, Cognizant Technology Solutions, Technologies, IBM, Secure Meters etc., Chambal Fertilizers, Samtel Glass, Mahindra and Mahindra, Ambuja Cement, GMR Infra, Indian Army, Alcatel-Lucent and Indian Navy.

== Alumni association ==
Engineering College Kota Alumni Association (ECKAA) is a former students association of UCE.

== See also ==
- Rajasthan Technical University
- RPET
