= Motwani =

Motwani is an Indian (Sindhi Hindu) surname. Notable people with the surname include:

- Hansika Motwani (born 1991), Indian film actress
- Neel Motwani, Indian TV actor
- Paul Motwani (born 1962), Scottish chess grandmaster
- Rajeev Motwani (1962–2009), Indian computer scientist
- Rohit Motwani (born 1990), Indian cricketer
- Sulajja Firodia Motwani (born 1970), Indian entrepreneur
- Sital K Motwani (born 1932), Hong Kong businessman
- Vikramaditya Motwane, Indian film director and producer

== See also ==
- Indian surnames
