= RPET =

RPET may be an acronym for:

- Rajasthan Pre-Engineering Test
- Recycled polyethylene terephthalate; see PET bottle recycling
