= University College of Engineering =

University College of Engineering may refer to:

- University College of Engineering, Arni, Tamil Nadu, India
- University College Of Engineering, Burla, Odisha, India
- University College of Engineering, Kakatiya University, Telangana, India
- University College of Engineering, Kanchipuram, Tamil Nadu, India
- University College of Engineering, Kariavattom, Kerala, India
- University College of Engineering, Nagercoil, Tamil Nadu, India
- University College of Engineering, Osmania University, Telangana, India
- University College of Engineering, Pattukkottai, Tamil Nadu, India
- University College of Engineering, Thodupuzha, Kerala, India

== See also ==
- UCE (disambiguation)
