= Bina Ramani =

Indian fashion designer, socialite, entrepreneur, and writer

- Born: Bina Lalvani; March 10, 1943 (age 82); Karachi, British India
- Occupations: Fashion designer, entrepreneur, socialite, writer
- Years active: 1970s–present
- Known for: Indian fashion and boutique movement; revitalization of Hauz Khas Village
- Partner: George Mailhot
- Children: Malini Ramani
- Relatives: Gulu Lalvani (brother)

Bina Ramani (born March 10, 1943) is an Indian fashion designer, socialite, entrepreneur, writer, restaurateur, and philanthropist. Her restaurants include: The Small Café, The Exit, Tamarind Tree in Delhi and Congo in Goa. She is known for pioneering boutique culture in India, developing the Hauz Khas Village art and fashion district in Delhi in 1980s, and later the Qutub Colonnade area and for her role as a key witness in the 1999 Jessica Lal murder case.

== Early life and education ==
Ramani was born into a Sindhi-Sikh family in Karachi, British India, around 1943. Her father was in the pharmaceutical business. After the Partition in 1947, her family relocated to Mumbai, where she grew up. She later studied decorative arts in London, though reports differ regarding her institution of study. Her elder brother Kartar Lalvani founded a UK-based telecommunications company Binatone in 1958, named after her.

== Career ==
After her divorce from Andy Ramani, she was an Air-India employee based in New York. Subsequently, she returned to India to set up a garment export business to the US. Ramani was among the early Indian designers to open high-end boutiques catering to the elite. Her store, "'Once Upon A Time", located in New Delhi, became a prominent label in the late 1970s and 1980s. In the early 1980s, she was among the first Indian designers to have her collection featured at Bloomingdale's in New York, including promotional window displays and advertisements in The New York Times.

Ramani founded and managed the restro-bar "Tamarind Court" in New Delhi, which became a popular cultural venue. It gained national attention after the 1999 Murder of Jessica Lal occurred on its premises, where Ramani was a key eyewitness.

In the 2010s, she launched the wellness and lifestyle brand "Malabar Secrets" (also called *Lady Malabar*), specializing in spice-flora infusions, herbal tonics, and natural health products.

=== Art, writing and activism ===
Ramani has exhibited art jointly with her partner George Mailhot. She is also the author of the memoir Bird in a Banyan Tree: My Story, which chronicles her life, work in fashion, the transformation of Hauz Khas Village, and the Jessica Lal case.

Ramani is widely credited with transforming Hauz Khas Village into a fashion and design hub during the 1980s. Her boutiques and cultural initiatives helped turn the heritage area into a center for design, art, and lifestyle in the capital.

== Controversies ==
In 2016, the Delhi High Court upheld her discharge from a forgery case linked to documentation arising from the Jessica Lal investigation.

== Personal life ==
Ramani was first married to San Fransciso based-Andy Ramani for 13 years before their divorce. The couple had two daughters, including designer Malini Ramani. She later married Canadian George Mailhot. She had a brief romantic relationship with actor Shammi Kapoor (after the death of his wife) before her first marriage, which she has discussed publicly, including in her autobiography, ‘Bird in a Banyan Tree-My Story. She continues to live at her home, at Saidul Ajaib, near Mehrauli, Delhi, with her daughter Malini Ramani.

== Awards and recognition ==
The Indian media often refers to Ramani as the "Godmother of Fashion in India" for her pioneering role in fashion, boutique culture, and lifestyle branding.

== Bibliography ==
- Bird in a Banyan Tree: My Story (Autobiography). Rupa Publications India, 2013. ISBN 8129129124
