= List of schools and colleges in Kanchipuram =

Kanchipuram in history has also been known as the ghatikasthanam or place of learning. Today several educational institutions offer courses in engineering, arts and science, and medicine, in and around Kanchi.

== List of Educational Institutions ==
Some of the Major Universities and Schools in the City are listed below.

Name of the Institution	Location
Schools
Billabong high international school	NH4, thamaraithangal village white gate (Vellai gate), Kanchipuram - 631502
Shrishti International School	NH 4, Thimmasamudram, Kanchipuram
Sangford School	Vandavasi Road, Abdullapuram
Vasanthas Nursery and Primary School	Vishar Village, Kanchipuram
INDU MATRICULATION SCHOOL
Agathiya Matriculation Higher Secondary School	Walajabad
Sree Narayana Guru Matriculation School	Kanchipuram
Anderson Higher Secondary School	Kanchipuram
AKT High School.	
Annie Besant Matriculation School	
Agathiya Nursery & Primary School	Ayyanpettai
BMS Government	
Bharathidhasan Matriculation Higher Secondary School	Orrikkai
C.S.M. Higher Secondary School	Pillaiyar Palayam
Govt.C.M. Subbaraya Mudaliar Higher Secondary School	Big Kanchipuram
Dr P.S.S MPL Higher Secondary School	
D.A.V School, Santhavellur	Sunguvarsathiram.
Devi Matriculation School	Walajabad
Government higher secondary school	Naickenpettai
Government Higher Secondary School	Iyyangarkulam
Government Girls Higher Secondary School	Big Kanchipuram.
Govt. Aringner Anna Hr Secondary School	Walajabad.
Infant Jesus Matriculation Higher Secondary School	kamatchi amman kovil street, Kanchipuram
M.L.M Mamallan Matriculation Higher Secondary School	
Maharishi International Residential School	Sriperumbudur
Pachaiyappa's Higher Secondary School	
pallavan matriculation school	kolivakkam
PTVS Higher Secondary School	
S.S.K.V Boys Higher Secondary School	
S.S.K.V Girls Higher Secondary School	
Sundar Mission Matriculation Higher Secondary School	
Victoria Matriculation School	kanchipuram
SWAMI VIVEKANANDA MATRIC HR.SEC. SCHOOL	Kanchipuram
Agathiya Matriculation Higher Secondary School (15 km)அகத்தியா மெட்ரிகுலேசன் மேல்நிலைப்பள்ளி	Walajabad வாலாஜாபாத்
Shri Vani Nilayam	
Aadhuraa Special School	
S.A.I Vidyalaya, CBSE School	Madam Street, Kanchipuram
sri sankara vidhayalaya mat.hr.scl	.
CHOLAN MATRICULATION HIGHER SECONDARY SCHOOL	Kanchipuram
CBSE Schools
Shrishti International School	NH 4, Thimmasamudram, Kanchipuram
Sangford School	Vandavasi Road, Abdullapuram
Dhwarkesh Vidhyashram	
Universities and Medical Colleges
Sri Chandrasekharendra Saraswathi Viswa Mahavidyalaya	
Aringar Anna Cancer Institute	
Meenakshi Medical college	
Chengalpattu Medical College & Hospital (Managed by Govt. of Tamil Nadu)	
Engineering colleges
University College of Engineering, Kanchipuram	
Arulmigu Meenakshi Amman College of Engineering, Kanchipuram	
Aksheyaa College of Engineering	Puzhuthivakkam
Pallavan Engineering College	White Gate
Kanchi Pallavan College of Engineering	Iyyangarkulam
Pallava Raja College of Engineering	Iyyangarkulam
Lord Venkateshwara Engineering College	
Thirumalai Engineering College	Vanchuvanchery, Padappai
Valliammai Engineering College	Kattangulathur
Polytechnics
Cholan Polytechnic College	
Bhaktavatsalam Polytechnic College	
Pallavan Polytechnic	Iyyangarkulam
Thirumalai Polytechnic College	Kilambi
arasimma Pallavan Polytechnic College	White Gate
Arts and Science Colleges
Kanchi Sri Krishna College of Arts and Science	Kilambi
Pachaiyappa's College for Men	
Pachaiyappa's College for Women	
Sri Sankara Arts & Science College	Eanathur PURATCHI THALAIVAR DR MGR ARTS AND SCIENCE COLLEGE UTHIRAMERUR
