= Kewalramani =

Kewalramani is a surname. Notable people with the surname include:

- Hashoo Kewalramani (1914–?), Sindhi dissident, political activist, and writer
- Reshma Kewalramani (fl. 1998), Indian business executive
