= Shamdasani =

Shamdasani is a Sindhi Hindu surname:

- Sonu Shamdasani (born 1962), Singapore-born author, editor, and reader at the Wellcome Trust Centre for the History of Medicine at University College London
- Anita Moorjani (born Anita Shamdasani, 1959), Singapore-born British author and cancer survivor

== Sources ==
- Bherumal Mahirchand Advani, "Amilan Jo Ahwal"- published in Sindhi, 1919
- Amilan Jo Ahwal (1919) - Translated into English ("A History of the Amils", 2016) at Sindhis
- Sindhi heritage: family trees and stories at Sindhi Heritage
