= Dino Lalvani =

British businessman (born 1973)

- Born: Dinesh Lalvani; 1973 (age 52–53)
- Title: Chairman and CEO, Binatone
- Spouse: Lisa Haydon (m. 2016)
- Children: 3
- Father: Gulu Lalvani
- Relatives: Kartar Lalvani (uncle); Tej Lalvani (cousin)

Dinesh "Dino" Lalvani (born 1973) is a British businessman, and the chairman and chief executive officer of Binatone, founded by his father Gulu Lalvani, and Hubble Connected – an IoT platform.

== Career ==
Lalvani purchased Binatone, a company that produces mobile phones, GPS devices, baby monitors and other cordless devices, from his father, Gulu Lalvani, in 2008. Since his acquisition, he has been the chairman and CEO of the company. He has previously been COO, and sales and marketing director. In 2012, Binatone became a global licensee of Motorola, producing audio equipment, GPS devices, dash cams, and other electronics under the brand.

Lalvani is the CEO of the internet-of-things company Hubble Connected, which develops wireless products for Motorola.

== Personal life ==
He has been married to Indian actress Lisa Haydon since 2016, and they have three children.
