= Lanjar (tribe) =

Sindhi Sammat tribe

Lanjar (Sindhi: لنجار) is a Sindhi Sammat tribe settled in Sindh, occupying a small part of Sindh. The majority of the Lanjars are found in Sukkur taluka Pano Aqil, Nawabshah, Ranipur, Sehwan, village Manjhu, Deh Khahi Qasim, Naushahro Feroze, Bhiria City, Lakho Lanjari in Ghotki, Lanjari Sharif, Shikarpur, and in various locations of Sindh.

== History ==
A famous saint of Manjhu called Makhdoom Sahirr Siwai (also known as Muhammad Saleh Lanjar) is buried in the cemetery of Manjhu village and his tomb is located there. Makhdoom Sahir Lanjar departed in the 15th century when Pathans attacked Sindh in the time when Samma Dynasty falls.

== Notable people ==
- Zia Ul Hassan Lanjar
