= UCE =

UCE may refer to:

== Science and technology ==
- Ultra-conserved element, a type of conserved sequence of DNA
- Unsolicited commercial email, a kind of email spam

== Universities ==
- University of Central England, now Birmingham City University
- Universidad Central del Ecuador (Central University of Ecuador), a national university in Ecuador
- Universidad Central del Este (Eastern Central University), a private institution in the Dominican Republic
- University College of Engineering (disambiguation)

== Other uses ==
- Uganda Certificate of Education, a certificate awarded for completion of secondary school in Uganda
- Unificación Comunista de España (Communist Unification of Spain), a Spanish political party

== See also ==
- University College of Engineering, Kakatiya University (KUCE), Kothagudem, India
