= Kripalani =

Kripalani or Kriplani is a surname of Indian origin who belongs to the tribe of Kripaldas, commonly used by Sindhi Hindus. Some people also write it as Kriplani. Notable people with the surname include:

- J. B. Kripalani (born 1888), popularly known as Acharya Kripalani was an Indian politician
- Moti Kripalani was an Indian civil servant who went to serve as Chief Commissioner of Ajmer and Pondicherry
- Krishna Kripalani (born 1907), was an Indian freedom fighter, author and parliamentarian
- Sucheta Kripalani (born 1908), was an Indian freedom fighter and politician
- Lekhraj Kripalani (born 1876), also known as Dada Lekhraj, was an Indian guru who was the founder of the Brahma Kumaris
- Aditya Kripalani (born 1981) is an Indian filmmaker, writer, musician and producer
- Jayant Kripalani is an Indian film, television and stage actor, director and trainer
- Shrichand Kriplani
- Alka Kriplani
