= Lalwani =

Lalwani is a Sindhi surname.

== Notable people ==
Notable people with the surname include:

- Bhupen Lalwani (born 1999), Indian cricketer
- Jiten Lalwani, Indian film and television actor
- Laksh Lalwani (born 1996), Indian model and actor
- Menaka Lalwani, Indian actress
- Natania Lalwani (born 1992), Indian singer-songwriter
- Nikita Lalwani, Indian-born Welsh novelist
- Palak Lalwani (born 1998), Indian actress, daughter of Jiten
- Sardarmal Lalwani (1910-2004), Indian politician
- Shankar Lalwani (born 1961), Indian politician and Member of Parliament

== See also ==
- Lalvani
