= Harchandrai Vishandas =

British Indian attorney and politician

- Born: 1 May 1862; Manjhu, Bombay Presidency
- Died: 16 February 1928 (aged 65); Delhi, Delhi division
- Occupations: Lawyer; Politician; Independence fighter; Mayor of Karachi
- Known for: Father of Modern Karachi

Harchandrai Vishandas C.I.E. (1 May 1862 – 16 February 1928) was a Sindhi attorney, politician, and mayor of Karachi in modern-day Pakistan. He is considered a great Sindhi and “the father of modern Karachi.” Due to his social, educational, and political services, he has been regarded as one of the makers of modern Karachi.

He was one of the first six young Sindhi men who graduated from Elphinstone College in Bombay prior to 1887. After completing law in 1885, Harchandrai accepted a junior position in the Shikarpur court, but soon resigned to begin a law practice in Karachi. He was the elected Honorary Secretary of Karachi Bar Association just after its establishment in 1890, and served for a full 38 years.

Harchandrai was the elected as a member of Karachi Municipality in 1888, and then served a term of ten years as its president between 1911 and 1921. As mayor of Karachi, he oversaw a major beautification project, which involved development of new roads, parks, residential and recreational areas. He was subsequently appointed to the Viceroy's Executive Council and was an Ex officio member of the Privy Council of the United Kingdom until his death in 1928.

== Early life ==
Seth Harchandrai Vishandas was born in 1862 in the village of Manjhu in tehsil Kotri, Sindh. He was born into a Bharvani family known for its public-spirited members.

His received his primary education at a school in Manjhu founded by his father, Seth Vishandas Nihalchand. After completing his primary, Harchandrai was sent to Kotri for middle education at a missionary school, and boarded there in a spacious bungalow. He was subsequently admitted to NJV High School in Karachi. He matriculated in 1878 and went to live with his maternal grandfather.

Thereafter, Harchandrai went to Bombay for higher education and read law at Elphinstone College, which he later patronised as his Alma mater. He received his law degree in 1882.

== Professional background ==
=== Legal field ===
Harchandrai was a lawyer and a Queen's Counsel under Queen Victoria, and later King's Counsel under King Edward VII and King George V.

Harchandrai initially took on a subordinate role in Shikarpur court. Persuaded by his father, he soon resigned and began his own law practice in Karachi in 1886. He was elected honorary secretary of the Karachi Bar Association.

=== Mayorship of Karachi ===
Harchandrai was elected mayor of the Karachi Municipal Committee in 1911 until 1921. Under his mayorship, civic improvements led to the installation of gas lamps along the city's streets and the introduction of footpaths. Electricity was introduced in Karachi in 1913 by Mayor Harichand Rai. That's why Karachi was called (and still is) ‘city of lights.’ Interestingly, it didn't become common in US till 1920, even though the electric bulb was invented there. He was also responsible for development works which led to shifting the course of the Lyari River, which opened up land for development.

=== Social services and politics ===
Seth Harchandrai played a role as a freedom fighter of India.

Seth Harchandrai in left with Mahatma Gandhi

Harchandrai was the first Sindhi to join the Indian National Congress and served the cause of national independence with dedication. He was influential in Congress; the 28th session of Congress in 1913 was held in Karachi largely due to the efforts of Harchandrai, his father Seth Vishandas and Ghulam Mohamed Bhurgari. He and his father served as chairman and Secretary of reception committee for that session. and he later presided over many Congress conferences in Sindh. Harchandrai was a believer of Hindu-Muslim unity and was a Sufistic. The Theosophical Society made him a member. He was one of the founder of Sindhi Gymkhana and Sindh Club in karachi and was twice elected president of the latter. Seth Harchand Rai Vashandas

== Death ==
Harchandrai Vishandas died on 16 February 1928 in Delhi. When the British Simon Commission was sent to India to dispute and review the working of 1919 reforms, the Congress party pressed for its boycott.

Harchandrai's vote was required for that purpose. Thus, he chose to leave Karachi against the advice of his doctor and friends, so determined he was to record his vote against the Simon Commission. However, on his way from the railway station to the Assembly Hall, Harchandrai suddenly died.

On 16 February 1934, on his sixth death anniversary, a statue of Harchandrai was unveiled in front of Karachi Municipal Corporation Building.
