= Manjhu =

- Deh Manjhu Raiyati
- Location within Sindh
- Coordinates: 25°36′29″N 68°21′11″E
- Country: Pakistan
- Province: Sindh
- District: Jamshoro

Area
  - Total: 0.98 km^{2} (0.38 sq mi)
- Elevation: 28 m (91 ft)

Population
  - Total: 900
- Time zone: UTC+5 (PST)

Manjhu (Sindhi: مانجھو) is a small village in the district of Jamshoro. The population of the village is estimated to be between 800 and 900. The population contains a heavy part of the Lanjar, Khosa, Khaskheli, Panhwar, Mir Bahar (Mallah), and Baladi tribes. It is situated beside the Unarpur railway station and is two kilometers from the right bank of Indus River. The village also has a rich schooling system. The Department of Education and Literacy - Sindh has established primary schools for girls and boys in Manjhu.

The complete postal address of Manjhu is "Post Office and village Manhju, near railway station Unarpur, Taluka Kotri, District Jamshoro."Village had been electrified in the year 1989, water supply has been commissioned in 2016. Small dispensary under PPHI is functional. A link road connecting the village with the Indus Highway was provided in 2014.

== Notable residents ==
- Seth Harchandrai Vishandas, politician & lawyer, born in Manjhu
