= Biyani International Institute of Engineering & Technology =

Coordinates: 26.9844898°N 75.5795053°E

Biyani International Institute of Engineering & Technology (Closed)
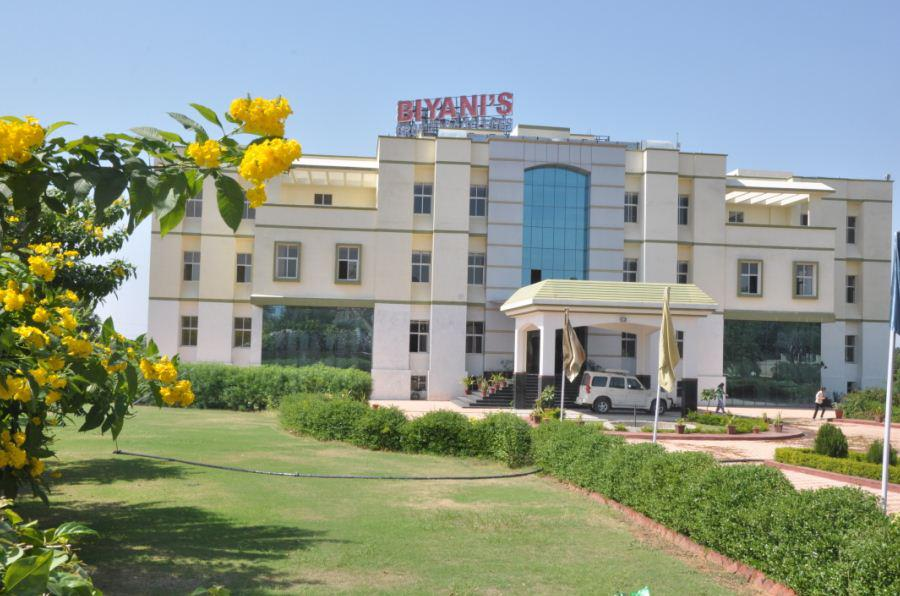
- Biyani institute of engineering and technology
- Motto in English: Where you can trust
- Type: Not-for-Profit Private
- Affiliations: All India Council for Technical Education and Rajasthan Technical University
- Chairman: Rajeev Biyani
- Director: Dr. Sanjay Biyani
- Location: Jaipur, Rajasthan, India
- Campus: Urban
- Acronym: BIIET
- Website: www.biiet.org

Biyani International Institute of Engineering & Technology (Closed) was a private girls engineering college (Now Closed) run by Biyani Shikshan Samiti in the State of Rajasthan, India. The campus was in Kalwar, Jaipur. Biyani Shikshan Samiti is registered under the Rajasthan Society Registration Act, 1958 having Reg. No. 500/Jaipur/1997-98.

== History ==
Biyani International Institute of Engineering & Technology was run by the Biyani Shikshan Samiti which was formed in 1997 with the objective of Women Empowerment through technical education.

== Recognition ==
The Institution was affiliated with Rajasthan Technical University, Kota. The Institution was approved by All India Council for Technical Education.
