= Deepak Bhojwani =

Indian diplomat

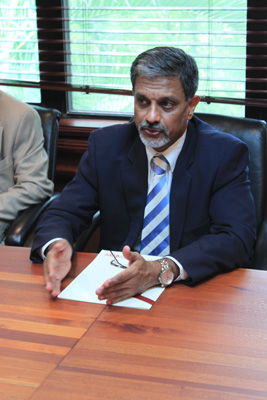
Ambassador Deepak Bhojwani.

Deepak Kishinchand Bhojwani (born 26 January 1952) is an Indian diplomat. He joined the Indian Foreign Service in 1978, and has since served as an ambassador in seven Latin American countries, including Colombia (2007–2010), Venezuela (2003–2006) and Cuba (2010–2013), as well as serving as Consul General in São Paulo, Brazil (-2003).

In 1994 he was picked by Indian Prime Minister Narasimha Rao to serve as his Private Secretary.

He has also served as a diplomat in the Indian Embassies of Indonesia, Malaysia, Spain and the Czech Republic as a lower level functionary.
