= Sital K Motwani =

Hong Kong industrialist, publisher, and social worker (1932–2019)

- Born: 10 October 1932; Hyderabad, British India
- Died: 3 February 2019 (aged 86)
- Occupations: Industrialist, publisher and social worker
- Awards: Bronze Bauhinia Star

Sitaldas Kewalram Motwani BBS, JP (10 October 1932 – 3 February 2019) was a Hong Kong industrialist, publisher and social worker.

== Early years ==
Born in Hyderabad, British India in 1932, Sitaldas K Motwani known as just K. Sital was just 15 years old when the family was obliged to move to Bombay in the wake of the partition of the subcontinent. He had his schooling in Karachi and Bombay and after working in India for two years, he left for Hong Kong in pursuit of his career in international commerce.

== Career ==
Sital became one of the many success stories of Sindhi entrepreneurial talent. He also felt the vast reservoir of talent represented by the Indian community of Hong Kong should be galvanised to better serve both the territory of their adoption and the country of their origin.

Right from his early years in Hong Kong, he was associated with the Indian Chamber of Commerce. He soon became a member of the Chamber's General Committee and in due course its vice-chairman. In 1969 he was elected Chairman of the Chamber, a position he held for eight one-year terms, a record in the history of the Chamber. The years of his leadership saw many 'firsts' for the Chamber. He led the first-ever Chamber delegation to China in 1979 and the first-ever delegation to India in 1981, which had the privilege of being received by the then Prime Minister Mrs. Indira Gandhi. Again it was Sital, as chairman, who organised the first ever participation by Hong Kong in a trade fair in India when a Hong Kong pavilion was set up at the India International Trade Fair in 1983.

A major negative development in the 1980s which affected a large number of Indian exporters in Hong Kong as well as banks which financed such exports was the balance of payments crisis in Nigeria. The Nigerian government overnight stopped all trade-related remittances out of the country and this resulted in millions of dollars due to Indian businessmen being held up in Nigeria. As soon as there was some order in the Nigerian economy and the government demonstrated its willingness to look at these trade debits, Sital took the initiative in opening a dialogue with the Nigerian government at various levels, mainly with the Governor of the Central Bank of Nigeria. He undertook several visits not only to Lagos but to the World Bank Headquarters in New York and to the banking institutions handling the problem in London. These prolonged negotiations over a period of two years resulted in what was under the circumstances the best possible settlement.

Sital's last term as chairman of the Indian Chamber of Commerce was 1982. However, he continued to take keen interest in the work of the Chamber making his experience available to successive general committees. In recognition of his services to the Chamber, he was appointed Permanent Honorary Adviser in 1986 and Permanent Honorary President in 1989.

Another organisation with which Sital was closely associated for a long period is the Hindu Association. He was President of the Association for several years and continued to devote a lot of time to this body which, among other things, manages the Hindu Temple in Happy Valley, Hong Kong.

Another community service office Sital had held for a number of years was that of chairman of the Council of Hong Kong Indian Associations (CHIA). This is an apex body which has seven associations as its constituents.

The Sino-British Joint Declaration of 1984 was welcomed by all including the Hong Kong Indian community since it provided for a smooth transfer of sovereignty over Hong Kong. However, there were misgivings in the minds of the ethnic minorities, mainly Indians, holding Hong Kong British passports. Sital took the lead on behalf of CHIA to plead their case for full British passport with right of abode in the UK This again meant several visits to London and ministerial level meetings with the British government. Sital was able to extract repeated assurances from the British that the interests of the ethnic minorities would be taken care of. This problem however, was solved satisfactorily and all the affected members of minority community were granted full British passports.

Although Sital was a permanent resident of Hong Kong and Hong Kong was also his business headquarters, he continued to maintain substantial links with India. He had several investments in India. Sital was a pioneer in conceiving and developing the idea of a free port in India. It was nearly two decades prior that Sital first mooted the idea and pursued it vigorously with the Indian authorities. The proposal seemed to gain ground and a site in the Andaman-Nicobar Islands was identified as a likely location. Unfortunately the idea never reached the stage of implementation although a number of high-power committees were set up to examine it and make recommendations. In any case the significance of the idea became considerably diluted by the ongoing process of liberalisation of the Indian economy.

In the new business environment in India, Sital continued to be active in promoting increased trade with and investments in India by overseas Indians. He was active member of the ambitious IndusInd group led by several prominent NRIs and persons of Indian origin to channel capital and business expertise from Sindhi businessmen all over the world into India.

Another activity to which Sital devoted considerable time and attention was the editing and publishing of the monthly magazine, The Indian – voice of 10 million overseas Indians in those days – for 40 years. The magazine served as a vehicle for the views and aspirations of the millions of Indians living outside India and kept them in touch with developments in various overseas Indian communities as well as in India. The journal, as the mouthpiece and reflection of the aspirations of the overseas Indians, helped preserve the correct image, not only of those overseas but also of those from India.

Sital also devoted much of his time doing research on the Indian diaspora settled all over the world, compiling the list of Indian firms in different regions and writing profiles on successful Indian entrepreneurs. He published 7 regional publications – Indians in Southeast Asia; Indians in Middle East & Africa; Indians in North & South America; Indians in Australasia & the Far East; Indians in the Gulf, the Middle East & the Indian Ocean; Indians in Europe; Indians in Africa; 100 Global Indian Entrepreneurs & Achievers. He was in the process of compiling "Overseas Indians Extraordinaire – A Who's Who of Select NRIs".

== Positions ==
He held the following positions in his business world:

- Chairman, Style Asia Group of Companies which is engaged in the Manufacture and export of watches and Consumer Electronics in Hong Kong and China, Real Estate development and Investment.
- Director, Satco Securities & Financial Services Ltd., Mumbai
- Permanent director, IndusInd International Holdings Limited, Mauritius
- Proprietor, The Indian International Magazine

== Community and public service – offices held ==
- Served as member of Trade Advisory Board, Hong Kong Government and member on the International Business Committee of Hong Kong
- Past chairman and senior advisor, Council of Hong Kong Indian Associations – an apex body affiliating nine Indian organisations representing a combined membership of nearly 4,000.
- Made representation on behalf of the council and undertook several visits to London lobbying the government authorities in Britain to obtain full British citizenship with right of abode in the UK to those ethnic minorities, mainly Indians, who faced statelessness after the handover of Hong Kong to China on 31 July 1997.
- Permanent honorary president, Indian Chamber of Commerce Hong Kong. Elected to this honorary office in 1986 following a long and close association with the chamber. Was chairman of the chamber in 1969, 1970, 1971, 1973, 1978, 1979,1981 and 1982.
- Under his chairmanship, the scope of services rendered by the chamber was enlarged by the creation of a special section for Trade Promotion. Initiated the publication of a number of trade publications designed to promote the trade and commerce of Hong Kong.
- Led a number of trade missions to the Middle East jointly organised by the chamber and the Hong Kong Trade Development Council.
- During his chairmanship of the Chamber, he organised the first-ever trade missions to China and India. The trade delegation in India was received by then prime minister of India, Indira Gandhi. As chairman of the Nigeria Committee of the Chamber (1986–1989) he devoted himself to and succeeded in the task of obtaining a fair deal from the Nigerian Government for the international business community who had their trade debts blocked in Nigeria.
- Honorary permanent president, Overseas Indian Organization.
- Chairman, Hindu Community Trust of Hong Kong
- President, Hindu Association Hong Kong – a religious body – which manages, among other things, the Hindu Temple in Happy Valley, Hong Kong, the centre of religious activities of Hong Kong's Hindu Community.
- Vice-president and co-coordinator for South East Asia, Hinduja Foundation London.
- Past president for two terms, the India Association Hong Kong.
- Chief patron, Priyadarshini Academy, Bombay, India.
- Patron, NRI (Non-Resident Indians) Association Hong Kong.
- Patron, Sindhi Association of Hong Kong & China.
- Patron, Vishwa Jagriti Mission India
- Founder, the Young Executive Group of Hong Kong.

== Recognition ==
- Awarded Bronze Bauhinia Star (BBS) by the Government of the Hong Kong Special Administrative Region (2009) for his distinguished services and contribution towards promoting Hong Kong's trade interests and fostering close economic ties between India and Hong Kong.
- Appointed justice of the peace by Her Majesty the Queen (1979).
- Awarded The Medal of Honour "Lithuanian Millenium Star" (2010) by the Foreign Affairs Ministry of the Republic of Lithuania for his lasting and fruitful representation of the Republic of Lithuania in the Hong Kong SAR.
- Conferred Pravasi Community Service Award (2004) by the Global Organization of People of Indian Origin – GOPIO in recognition of his outstanding services to the NRI/PIO communities.
- Awarded Bharatvanshi Samaj Bhushan Puraskar (2010) by Vishwa Adhyayan Kendra (VAK), India, to honour his selfless community service.
- Presented PIO Community Award (2010) by Bharatiya Sindhu Sabha & Vivekanand Education Society for his distinguished leadership and outstanding services in the areas of publishing, networking and trade.
- Presented a Testimonial by The Filipino Indian Chamber of Commerce (1994) in recognition of his efforts towards promoting Subic Free Port Zone and developing the ties between Hong Kong and the Philippines.
- Presented a Plaque by Pepperdine University, Malibu, California (1989) in recognition of his friendship and sustaining support.

== Publications ==
- A monthly magazine The Indian devoted to overseas Indians. The magazine has throughout striven to bring about integration of the Indian community with other communities and promoted social co-existence and harmony. He has also been bringing out an annual publication entitled Directory of Indian Firms in Greater China & the Hong Kong SAR since 1968.
- Indians in Southeast Asia
- Indians in Middle East & Africa
- Indians in North & South America
- Indians in Australasia & the Far East
- Indians in the Gulf, the Middle East & the Indian Ocean
- Indians in Europe
- Indians in Africa
- 100 Global Indian Entrepreneurs & Achievers
