= University College of Engineering, Kanchipuram =

Institute in Tamil Nadu, India

University College of Engineering Kanchipuram
- Type: Constituent College Of Anna University Chennai
- Established: 2010
- Dean: Dr. P.Sakthivel
- Faculty: 45+
- Students: 850+
- Location: NH-4, Chennai Bangalore Highway, Ponnerikkarai, Kancheepuram - 631552, Kanchipuram, Tamil Nadu, India; 12°31′N 79°25′E
- Website: www.aucek.com

University College Of Engineering Kanchipuram, popularly known as UCEK, is a government engineering college located in the temple city Kanchipuram, Tamil Nadu, India. The college was established in 2010 and affiliated with Anna University, Chennai. It offers Bachelor of Engineering degrees in Computer Science Engineering, Electrical and Electronics Engineering, Electronics and Communication Engineering, and Mechanical Engineering.

== History ==
This college was established in 2010 as one of the constituent college of Anna University, through a policy decision made by the government of Tamil Nadu at that time. But during 2011 a permanent site for the college was identified and allotted by the Government of Tamil Nadu, on the Chennai–Bangalore Highway, Karaipettai village. The new site consists of a total land area of about 10.4 acres. As of June 2012 constructions are nearing completion for the initial plan of 4 laboratories, 4 class rooms, office and Dean's cabin.

On 5 April 2013, Dean's office and 4 class rooms were shifted to the new campus.

On 27 November 2013, the girls' hostel was shifted to a nearby building on the Paranthur Road, This building is a new building in which all the girl students are accommodated instead of the 3 different buildings in the Kanchipuram town 10 km from the college.

The work for the construction of academic and administrative blocks along with hostels for girls and boys was completed in academic year 2014-15. So far there have been four batches of students from the academic year 2010–2011 who are currently pursuing their degree program in this engineering institution.

== Campus ==
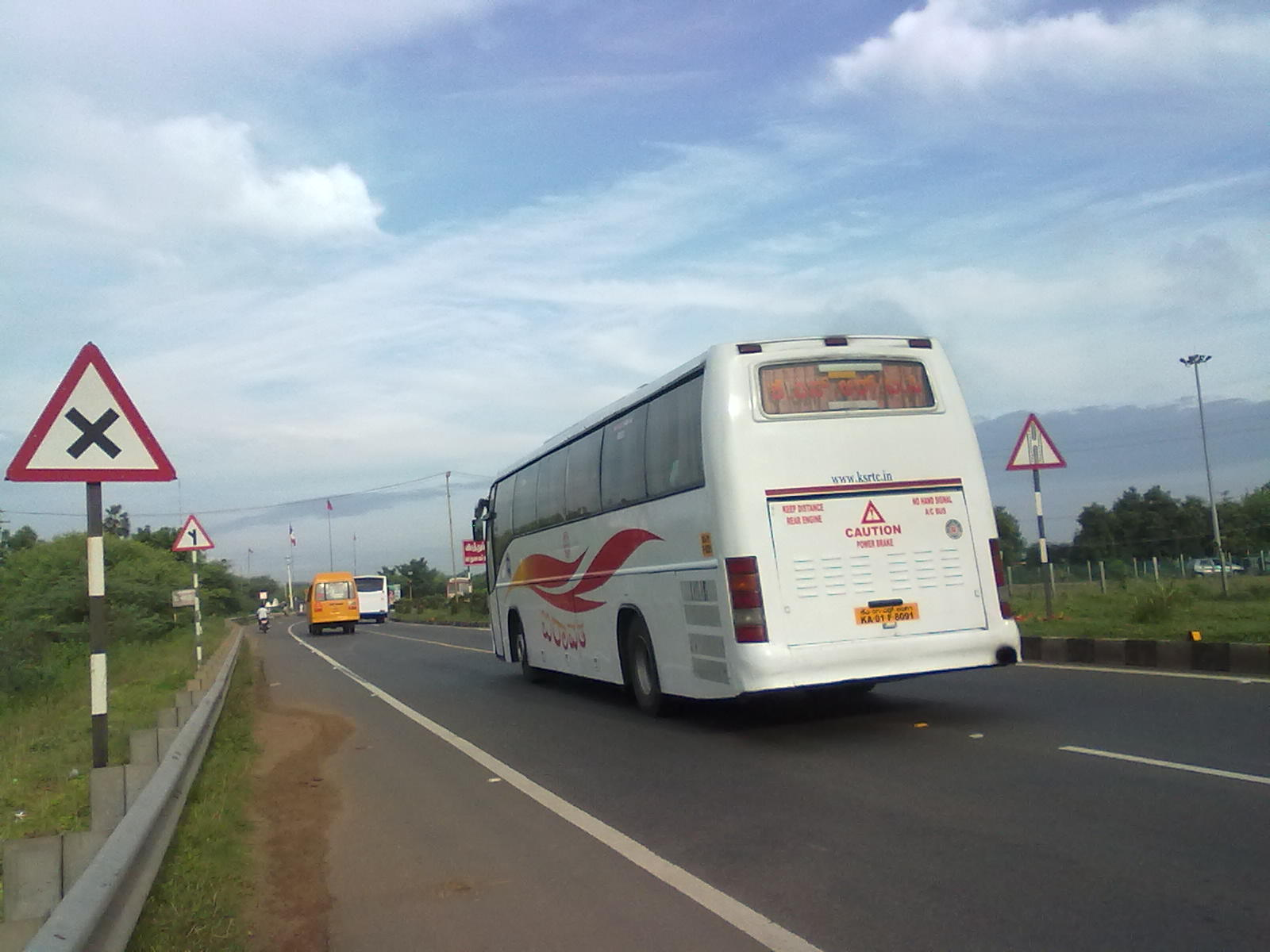
Chennai-Bangalore highway

The college was originally situated near NH 4 in Karaipettai, which is 6 kilometres (3.7 mi) from Kanchipuram.

In 2017, the college moved to a new campus at NH-4, Chennai-Bangalore highway, Ponnerikarai near the regional transportation office.

== Organisation and administration ==
University college of engineering Kanchipuram, being a constituent college of Anna University, is governed by a Chancellor, Vice-Chancellor and Registrar of the varsity. The varsity has a syndicate and Academic council. As part of the new nonadministrative directive a Regional Director oversees the development of the college. The Dean is the head of the College and oversees day-to-day administration. Each department is led by a Head of the Department (HOD). The hostels are headed by Deputy wardens reporting to an executive warden.

The academic policies are decided by the course committee, whose members include all the professors and student representatives headed by a chairman.

=== Dean ===
On 12 September 2012, Dr. T.N. Shanmugam, Professor of Mathematics and Director Centre for Intellectual Property Rights of Anna University was appointed as the First Dean of the University college of Engineering Kanchipuram. On 6 May 2014 Dr. N. Senthil Kumar, Associate Professor, Department of Management Studies, Anna University Chennai assumed charge as Dean in charge.

=== Principal ===
Dr. M. Kothandapani was the principal of UCEK.

He had served as a Principal i/c of the University College Engineering of Kanchipuram between August 2010 and September 2012. Currently, he is the Head of Department of Mathematics and Zonal Coordinator, Zone – VI, Anna University, Chennai.

== Student life ==
=== Societies ===
==== Mechosapiens ====
Mechofeast ’13 is a national level technical competition organized and conducted by the Society of Mechanical Engineers (Mechosapiens), Department of Mechanical Engineering, University College of Engineering Kanchipuram. The main aim of conducting an event is to trigger out and fetch the innovative ideas, managerial skills to the students and to give a detailed exposure of existing and upcoming technologies in the field of Mechanical engineering. This event is organized and conducted by the students for the benefit of the student of Mechanical Engineering.

==== SEEE ====
Society of Electrical and Electronics Engineering (SEEE) was established as part of the academia of the University College Of Engineering Kanchipuram. It is a professional society which aims to bridge the gap between technology and community.

One of the early societies of UCEK was SEEE (Society of Electrical and Electronics Engineers). SEEE was inaugurated by Dr.B.Umamaheshwari, Chairman Faculty of Electrical Engineering, Anna University, Chennai on 09.03.2013. The Society conducts symposium every year on latest developments in the field of Electrical and Electronics Engineering.

==== SCA ====
The SCA (Society of Computer Architects) was established in the academic year 2013-14, it is a professional society which aims to bridge the increasing gap between technology and community.

==== Project Expo ====
Project expo is conducted by the society of computer architects in the year of 2017. All departments students participated in this event.

=== Symposiums ===
The college hosts several symposiums throughout the year. Each Department conducts symposiums, technical fests and conferences. The events in the fests include technical, non-technical, managerial, social and co-curricular activities.

Year	Dept. of CSE	Dept. of ECE	Dept. of EEE	Dept. of MECH
2013	iAdroit 2k14	Aventura 2k13	SMEW 2k13	Mechofeast 13'
2014			SYMSYC 2k14	
2015	DREAM			
2016	SPARK v1.0			
2017	SPARK v2.0			

=== Events ===
The college has hosted several events, both academic and co-curricular. These include a student enlightenment program called "NAMBIKKAI" based on the new grounds, to help the students cope up with the newer environment. This was conducted for the past two years, where students from University College of Engineering Arni also accompanied the University College of Engineering Kanchipuram at the auditorium. Also there are plans fabricated by the college to conduct annual sports meet as well as college cultural during the coming year.

=== Industrial visits ===
There have been technical learning sessions for the students who have visited several industries and factories as part of their Industrial Visit .

During the academic year 2011–12, students of batch 2010–14 from the department of Mechanical engineering and the second year students of Electrical and Electronics engineering (2010–2014 batch) went to Industrial Visit. The Department of Mechanical engineering along with their faculties Mr. Shyam, Mr. Prakash, Mr. Raja went to the Hyundai Motor India Limited industry located at the heart of Irrungattukottai SIPCOT near Sriperumbudur. There they had on-site and in-hand training about the manufacturing and assembling process involved in their Productions like models Hyundai i10, Hyundai Verna.

During the academic year 2011–12, students of batch 2010–14 from the department of Mechanical engineering along with their faculties Mr. Shyam Shankar, Mr. Vipin Allien, went to the JSW Steel is among India's largest steel producers, with a capacity of 14.3 million ... with its plant located at Toranagallu in the Bellary-Hospet area of Karnataka.

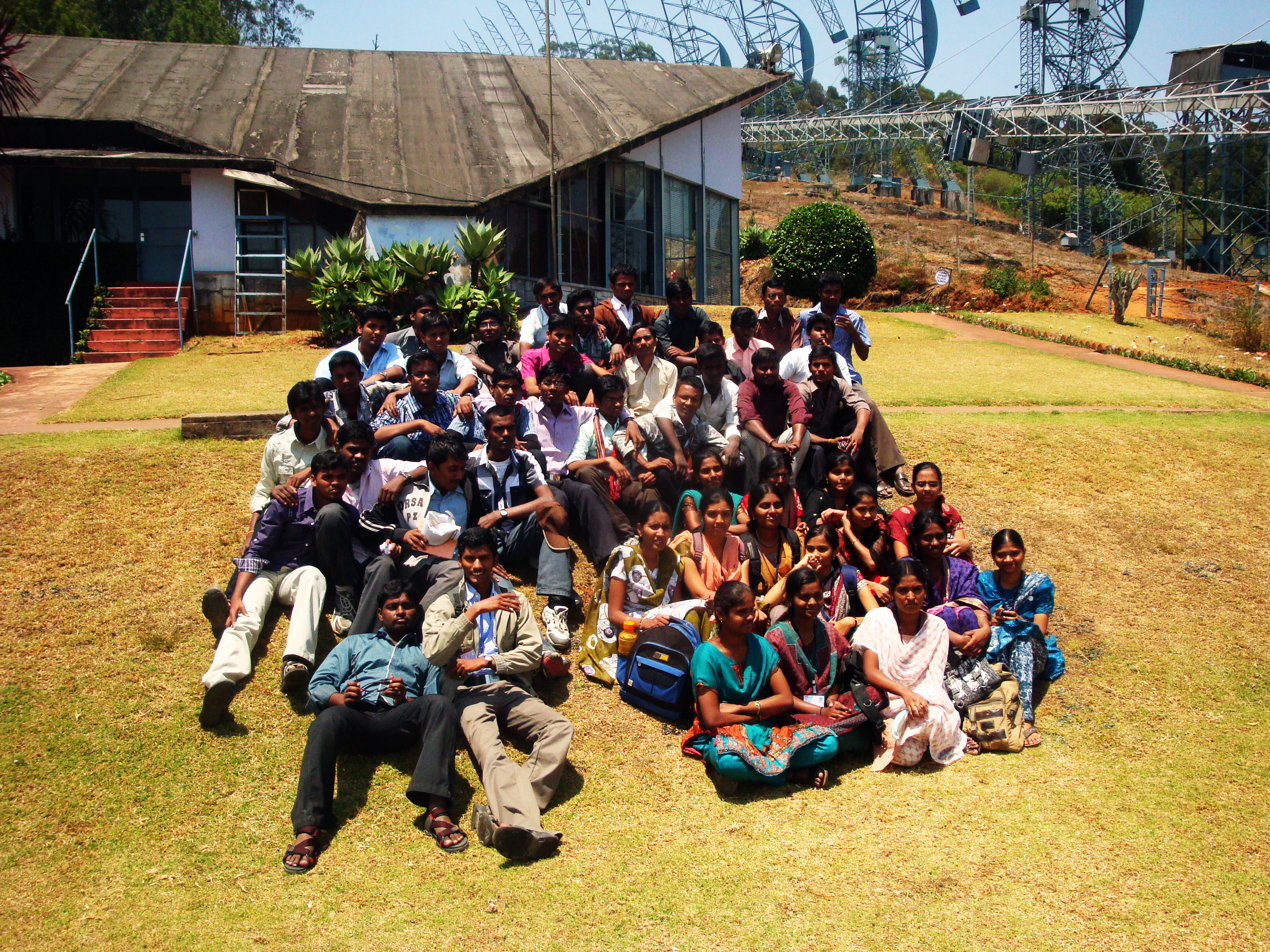
"EEE students of UCEK at Radio Astronomical center Ooty"

The students of batch 2010–14 belonging to the department of Electrical and Electronics Engineering along with their faculties Mr. Narendran, Ms. Vimala, Mr. Vijayakumar visited to the Kundah Hydro power plant and Radio Astronomical center located at Ootacamund. There they learned about the production of electric power from water and also the control systems involved in maintaining the large-scale equipment and devices.

During the Academic Year 2013-14, students of batch 2012-16 from the dept of Mechanical Engineering along with faculty MR.Rajesh visited ISRO Propulsion Unit, Mahendragiri located at Tirunelveli. The students understand various information about various rocket propulsion system used by ISRO.

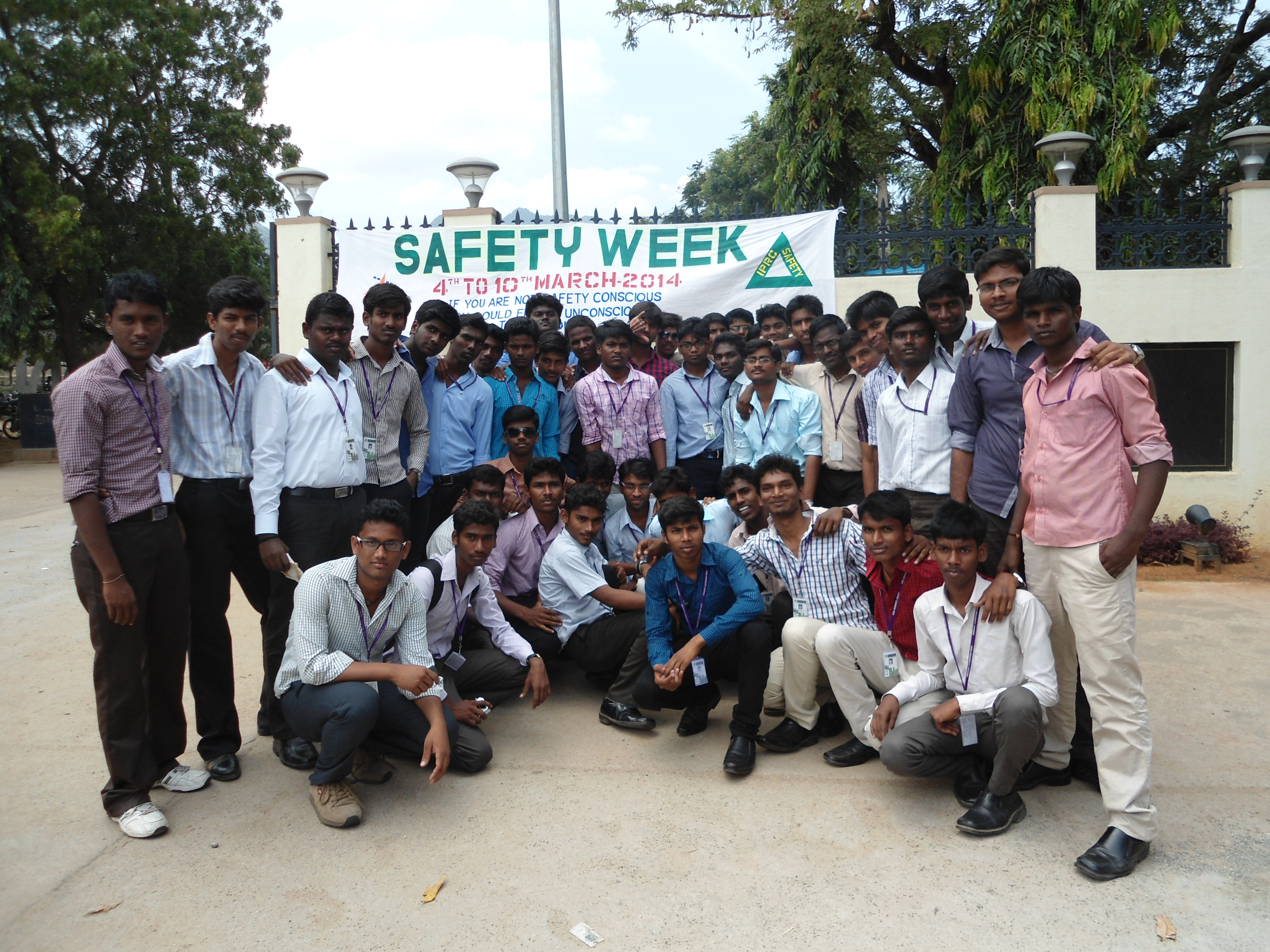

During the academic year 2018-19, the students of batch 2016-2020 belonging to the department of Electrical and Electronics Engineering along with their faculties Mr. Vijayakumar, Ms. Dhivya visited to the "Numeric Ups" Production and Assemble factory located in Cholinganallur, Chennai. There they learned about the production of "ununited power supply" and "Steblizers" maintaining and makes the purpose of large-scale industries and domestic uses.

During the academic year 2013–14, the students of batch 2012–16 belonging to Computer science and Engineering visited Porous Technologies at Coimbatore and Kerala.

=== Placements ===
The UCEK has a placement cell which will coordinate and encourages students to attend the placement interviews.

=== Sports ===
During recent times there has been exponential growth of success from the colleges teams of chess, football, cricket, Badminton and kabadi. The teams have performed well in the Zonal Sports conducted by Anna University during the Academic year 2012–13.

Intra-college sports has also been conducted in the college premises during the academic year 2013-14 in the month of April. Prizes for the winners and participants were distributed at the Sports Day function held at UCEK - New campus on march.

=== Softskills training ===
During the odd semester holidays of the academic year 2012–13, a special 10-day softskills training program was conducted by RIPE softskills training institute for the students of university college engineering, Kanchipuram.

=== Celebrations ===
Several intra-college celebrations are conducted from time to time.

==== Republic day ====
On 26 January 2013 the republic day was celebrated for the first time on the new campus located near ponnerikarai. The national flag was hoisted by the Dean, Dr. T.N. Shanmugam, and the national anthem was sung by students of UCEK. On that occasion several socio-cultural events such as drama, song, dance, speech (themed around the republic day) also took place.

== See also ==
- Constituent Colleges Of Anna University
- List of schools and colleges in Kancheepuram
- List of Tamil Nadu Government's Educational Institutions
