= Nanikram Dharamdas Mirchandani =

Sindhi language writer (1890–1946)

- Born: 1890 Sindh, British India
- Died: 1946 (aged 55–56)
- Occupation: Novelist; Actor-dramatist
- Language: Sindhi

Nanikram Dharamdas Mirchandani (Note: Sindhi: نانڪرام ڌرمداس ميرچنداڻي) (1890–1946), was a Sindhi novelist, essayist, and actor-dramatist from British India. He was known for his contributions towards the advancement of Sindhi theatre through the portrayal of social realism. Within the Hyderabad Amateur Dramatic Society in Sindh, he authored full-length, and one-act plays which focused on social issues and also played pivotal roles in their productions. He is described as the third prolific Sindhi dramatist and is positioned as a crucial figure facilitating continuity between historical theatrical traditions and contemporary expressions. His plays were presented by the Hyderabad Dramatic Society established in 1910.

Subsequently, Mirchandani established his own drama club, where his inaugural play, "Farebi Fitno" ('Deceitful Brawl'), a rendition of Marie Corelli's "Vendetta!", was revived in 1920. His repertoire includes fourteen plays, all of which were successfully staged. He is also known for having adapted Shakespeare's "Taming of the Shrew" in Sindhi with the title 'Chata Na Chamat' ('Neither Persuasion nor Punishment', 1922). Among his most notable works are "Manohar Mohini" (‘Attractive Enchantress’, 1923), "Basant Manorma" (1928), "Bebaha Moti" (‘Priceless Pearl’, 1936), and "Suhini-Mehar" (‘Suhini and Mehar’, 1946), which were inspired by Sindhi folktales.
