= Kartar Lalvani =

British-Indian businessman

Kartar Singh Lalvani
- Born: Kartar Singh Lalvani; December 1931 (age 94); Karachi, Sind, British India
- Citizenship: British
- Occupation: Businessman
- Known for: Founding Vitabiotics
- Title: Chairman, Vitabiotics
- Children: Tej Lalvani
- Relatives: Gulu Lalvani (brother); Dino Lalvani (nephew)

Kartar Singh Lalvani OBE (born December 1931) is a British-Pakistani businessman, and the founder and chairman of Vitabiotics, a vitamin and mineral-based food supplements company.

Lalvani was born to a Sindhi Sikh family in 1931 in Karachi. Lalvani's father was the owner of pharmacies in Karachi before the partition of India. His family moved to Bombay after partition, where he was raised and educated. He was one of nine brothers and sisters. He first came to London in 1956 to study pharmacy and went on to complete his doctorate from the University of Bonn. His family subsequently migrated to London during the 1960s.

He founded Binatone with his brothers Gulu Lalvani and Pratap Singh Lalvani, which is currently run by Gulu's son Dino Lalvani. Vitabiotics is currently run by his own son Tej Lalvani. Lalvani's youngest sister is the socialite Bina Ramani (née Lalvani), after whom Binatone was named. In 2008, Lalvani had an estimated net worth of £200 million.

He is also a philanthropist, private scholar and historian, serving as an honorary professor at the University of Franche-Comté. Lalvani has written about the colonial history of India.

== Bibliography ==
- Lalvani, Kartar (2016). The Making of India: The Untold Story of British Enterprise. Bloomsbury Publishing. p. 464. ISBN 9781472924841.
