= Hashoo Kewalramani =

Sindhi dissident

- حشو ڪيولراماڻي
- Born: Hashmat Tehilram Kewalramani; December 20, 1914; Naushahro Feroze District, Sindh, British Raj
- Died: 1987
- Education: University of London
- Occupations: Writer, political activist, journalist
- Known for: Sindhi rights activism; Forced exile from Pakistan (1949); Inclusion of Sindhi language in Indian Constitution
- Notable work: Pakistan X-rayed
- Movement: Sindhi Nationalism
- Children: 1 son

Hashmat Kewalramani, also spelled as Hashmat Kevalramani, sometimes written as Hushu Kewalramani, but most commonly as Hashoo Kewalramani (Sindhi: حشو ڪيولراماڻي), was a Sindhi dissident, political activist, and writer. He was forcibly exiled from Pakistan in 1949.

As a writer, he authored a book called Pakistan X-rayed. He also wrote articles for Economic and Political Weekly.

== Early life and education ==
Kewalramani was born in Bhiria village (Now city) of Naushahro Feroze District on December 20, 1914. His father, Tehilram, served as a Resident Magistrate. After his father's demise when he was eight, his mother took over his upbringing and education.

Kewalramani's educational journey took him from Karachi to Ceylon (modern-day Sri Lanka), and eventually to England, where he was exposed to socialism. While in London, Kewalramani was a classfellow of Indira Gandhi and was actively involved in the independence movement. Among his companions were Shaikh Ayaz, Sobho Gianchandani, Ibrahim Joyo, and GM Syed. His political involvement grew while in England, culminating in his active participation in the Indian student community and the labor movement. He returned from England without a degree to engage in politics.

== Career ==
Returning to Sindh in 1939, he became involved in the labor and student movements in Karachi. Despite confrontations with authorities leading to his imprisonment, Kewalramani founded the Sindh Students Federation in 1942, encouraging socialist and nationalist ideologies among young people.

Syed noted that Kewalramani contributed significantly to the establishment of the Sindhi Samaj in Delhi, initially organizing a Sindhi Language Convention attended by then President of India, Radha Krishan. He advocated for a united, independent India and opposed British rule.

Following the 1947 partition of India, Kewalramani advocated for Sindhi rights and due to this, he was placed under house arrest in Karachi. During this period, he translated GM Syed's book My Struggle for a New Sindh into English and worked for the monthly magazine Pakistan Times. His activities were deemed threatening by the new Pakistani government, resulting in his forced departure from the country in 1949.

Despite being presented before the court of Masood Khadarpoosh, then Commissioner of Karachi, Kewalramani was unwilling to leave Pakistan for India. Relocated to India, he turned to journalism and worked towards the recognition of the Sindhi language and culture. He was a significant figure in the movement to include the Sindhi language in the Indian Constitution and advocated for the revival of the Sindhi script. Kewalramani maintained communication with key figures in Sindh and composed numerous English columns regarding various sociopolitical issues. He also translated several Sindhi stories into English, further contributing to Sindhi literature. Even after 15 years of exile in India, he still considered himself a refugee in 1963.

== Personal life ==
Kewalramani married Sarla Ahuja, with whom he had a son named Gul who later gained prominence in the art world.

== Books written ==
- Pakistan X-rayed (1951)
- Sindhi Short Stories
