= Gulu Lalvani =

British-Indian businessman

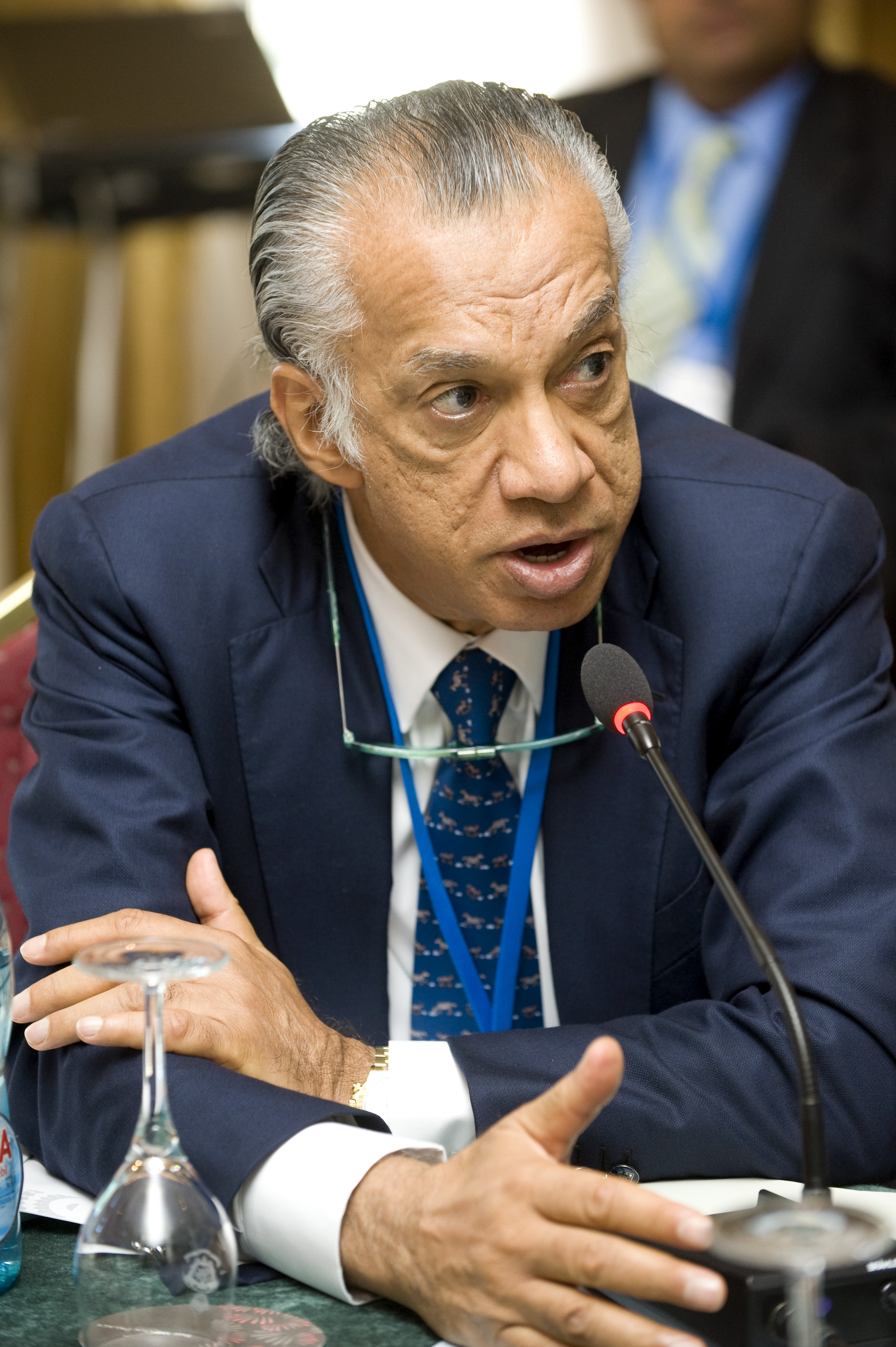
- Born: March 1939 (age 87); Karachi, Sind Province, British India
- Occupation: Businessman
- Known for: Co-founder of Binatone
- Title: Chairman, Binatone
- Spouses: Vimla Lalvani (divorced) Semiramis Pekkan (m. 1987; div. 1996)
- Children: 3, including Dino Lalvani, Zoran Lalvani
- Relatives: Kartar Lalvani (brother); Tej Lalvani (nephew); Lisa Haydon (daughter-in-law)

Gulu Lalvani (born March 1939) is a British businessman, the founder and chairman of Binatone, a manufacturer of digital cordless phones. He founded the company along with his brothers Kartar Lalvani (founder of Vitabiotics) and Pratap Singh Lalvani to import radios from Hong Kong. Binatone is currently run by his son Dino Lalvani.

== Early life ==
Gulu Lalvani was born to a Sindhi Sikh family in March 1939, in Karachi, Sind, British India (now in Pakistan). His family moved to Bombay after the partition of India, where he was raised and educated. He was one of nine brothers and sisters. His brothers Kartar Lalvani and Pratap Singh Lalvani are also businessmen who founded Binatone with him. Kartar is also the founder of the nutraceutical company Vitabiotics, which is currently run by his son Tej Lalvani. Gulu's youngest sister is the socialite Bina Ramani (née Lalvani), after whom Binatone was named. The family subsequently migrated to London during the 1960s.

== Career ==
In 1958, Lalvani founded Binatone, once one of the world's largest manufacturers of digital cordless phones. He founded the company with his brother Partap, and they named it after their sister, Bina.

In 2008, his net worth was estimated at £435 million. Lalvani has substantial interests in Phuket, Thailand, including a villa in Amanpuri.

== Personal life ==
Lalvani's first marriage was with Vimla Lalvani, their son Dino Lalvani currently runs Binatone. He later married Turkish actress and singer Semiramis Pekkan (sister of singer Ajda Pekkan) in 1987, with whom he has a son, it also ended in a divorce in 1996. Lalvani currently lives in Phuket, Thailand. In 2006, his daughter Divia married Joel Cadbury, son of the businessman Peter Cadbury.
