= Gabrani =

Gabrani گبراني
- Village
- Location within Iran
- Coordinates: 27°00′02″N 57°04′57″E
- Country: Iran
- Province: Hormozgan
- County: Minab
- Bakhsh: Central
- Rural District: Band-e Zarak

Population (2006)
  - Total: 764
- Time zone: UTC+3:30 (IRST)
  - Summer (DST): UTC+4:30 (IRDT)

Gabrani (Persian: گبراني, also Romanized as Gabrānī) is a village in Band-e Zarak Rural District, in the Central District of Minab County, Hormozgan Province, Iran. At the 2006 census, its population was 764, in 132 families.
