= Suresh H. Advani =

Indian oncologist (b. 1947)

Suresh Hariram Advani
- Sudhakar Shinde, Mukesh Batra & Satya Brahma conferred the recognition to Suresh Hariram Advani
- Born: August 1, 1947 (age 79); Karachi, British India (now in Pakistan)
- Education: Grant Medical College, MBBS, MD
- Occupation: Oncologist
- Known for: Pioneering hematopoietic stem cell transplantation in India
- Website: Official website

Suresh Hariram Advani (born August 1, 1947) is an Indian oncologist known for his work in hematopoietic stem cell transplantation. Affected by poliomyelitis at age eight, he studied at Grant Medical College, Mumbai, earning MBBS and MD degrees. After completing his education, he joined the Tata Memorial Centre as a medical oncologist, where he worked for several years. He has been associated with Sushrut Hospital & Research Centre as a consultant. Advani received training in bone marrow transplantation at the Fred Hutchinson Cancer Research Center, Seattle, Washington.

== Early life and education ==
Advani was born on 1 August 1947 in Karachi, then part of British India (now in Pakistan). Following the partition, his family relocated to India, first residing in Deolali, Nashik, before settling in Mumbai. His father worked in the electrical trade.

After initially being denied admission due his disability, Advani persuaded authorities admit him to Grant Medical College, Mumbai. He completed his medical degree there in 1966. After training in internal medicine and hematology-oncology at JJ Hospital, Grant Medical College, Mumbai, he undertook additional training in oncology at the Fred Hutchinson Cancer Research Center in Seattle, where he worked with Nobel laureate E. Donnall Thomas, a pioneer of bone marrow transplantation in the United States.

== Honours ==
- Padma Bhushan by the Government of India (2012)
- Padma Shri by the Government of India (2002)
- Elected Fellow, National Academy of Medical Sciences (1996)
