= Thadani =

Thadani is a surname. Notable people with the surname include:

- Mohit Thadani (born 1991), Rajasthani cricketer
- Suhani Thadani (born 2006), American cricketer
- Vijay K. Thadani (born 1951), Indian businessman
