= Semiramis Pekkan =

Turkish actress and singer

- Born: 30 September 1948 (age 77); Istanbul, Turkey
- Years active: 1964–present
- Spouses: Fikret Hakan (m. 1964; div. 1964) Ercüment Karacan (m. 1974; div. 1986) Gulu Lalvani (m. 1987; div. 1996)
- Children: 2; Emir Karacan (1979-1984), Zoran Lalvani (DOB: 1988)
- Relatives: Ajda Pekkan (sister)
- Website: SemiramisPekkan.com

Semiramis Pekkan (born 30 September 1948) is a Turkish film actress and singer.

== Career ==
She is the youngest daughter of her family. Pekkan's mother was a housewife and her father was a military officer. She started her career with the movie Kara Memed directed by Tunç Başaran. Semiramis Pekkan has appeared as a guest actor on the Meydan Stage between 1965 and 1966. She started her music career in 1968 and was awarded the Gold Record Award in the following years. After getting married, she ended her career in cinema and music until 2022. She has three studio albums that were released with Columbia, Odeon and Kervan music labels.

== Discography ==
=== 45rpms ===
- Bu Ne Biçim Hayat (Those Were The Days) / İçelim Kendimizden Geçelim (Columbia-1968)
- Olmaz Bu İş Olamaz / Samanlık Seyran Olur (Columbia-1968)
- Köy Düğünü / Tanrı Verdi Çalmadım Ki (Columbia-1968)
- Ne Geçti Elime / Eski Sandal (Columbia-1969)
- Ben Böyleyim / Bir Dost Ararım (Columbia-1969)
- Vur Patlasın Çal Oynasın / Bile Bile (Odeon-1970)
- Eskisi Gibi Değilim / Dert Ortağım (Odeon-1970)
- Ararım Sorarım / Bir Gün Elime Düşersin (Odeon-1970)
- Senden Vazgeçmem / Sen Ne Dersinde Olmaz (Odeon-1971)
- Gülelim Sevelim / O Karanlık Gecelerde (Odeon-1971)
- Bu Gece Kaçır Beni / Keyfine Bak (Odeon-1972)
- Düşmanlarım Çatlasın / İndim Yarin Bahçesine (Odeon-1972)
- Çöpçatan / Sevgilim Dermisin (Kervan-1973)
- Sen Hayatsın Ben Ömür / Ya O Ya Ben (Kervan-1974)
- Neydi Neydi Ne / Ne İsen (Kervan-1974)
- Unuttu Unuttu / Bana Yalan Söylediler (Kervan-1974)
- Doğum Günün Kutlu Olsun / İki Kere Ağlamışım (Kervan-1975)
- İyiler Kötüye Düşer / O Var Ya (Kervan-1975)

=== Albums ===
- Semiramis (1970)
- Semiramis (1972)
- Semiramis (1975)

=== Singles ===
- 2022: "Bana Yalan Söylediler"
- 2024: "Unutamadım"

== Filmography ==
The movies she had a role in include:

Year	Title	Role	Notes
1964	Kara Memed		
1965	Artık Düşman Değiliz	Mine	
1966	Nuh'un Gemisi		
1966	Gaddarlar		
1966	Çıtkırıldım		
1966	Çılgın Gençlik	Sema	
1967	Zehirli Hayatlar	İnci Pekkan	
1967	Yaprak Dökümü	Necla	
1967	Söyleyin Genç Kızlara	Semiramis Pekkan	Guest appearance
1967	Pranga Mahkumu	Cavidan	
1967	Ömre Bedel Kız	Sevgi	
1967	Krallar Ölmez	Nil	
1967	Kara Davut	Mahinur	
1967	Kader Bağı	Rose	
1967	Düşman Aşıklar	Gonca	
1967	At Hırsızı Banuş	Zeynep	
1967	Ölünceye Kadar	Nazan	
1968	Kalbimdeki Yabancı		
1968	Aşka Tövbe	Nazan	
