= Bijlani =

Bijlani is a surname. Notable people with the surname include:

- Arjun Bijlani (born 1982), Indian actor
- Sangeeta Bijlani (born 1960), Indian model and actress
