= Biyani Institute of Science and Management for Girls =

Coordinates: 26.9567°N 75.7790°E

BISMA
- Motto: Where you can trust
- Type: Not-for-Profit Private
- Established: 1997
- Affiliations: Rajasthan Technical University and All India Council for Technical Education
- Chairman: Sh. Rajeev Biyani
- Director: Dr. Sanjay Biyani
- Head: Smt. Pushpa Biyani
- Location: Jaipur, India
- Newspaper: Biyani Times
- Website: www.bisma.in

Biyani Institute of Science and Management (BISMA) is a private girls college in Jaipur run by Biyani Educational society in the State of Rajasthan, India. Biyani Educational society is registered under the Rajasthan Society Registration Act, 1958 having Reg. No. 500/Jaipur/1997-98.

== Recognition ==
The Institution is affiliated with Rajasthan Technical University, Kota. The Institution is also approved by All India Council for Technical Education.

== Campus ==
The Institute has campus in Vidyadhar nagar, Jaipur, Rajasthan, India.
