= Rajasthan Pre-Engineering Test =

Rajasthan Engineering Admission Process (REAP) is the state-level entrance examination for undergraduate engineering programs in Rajasthan State, India. The admissions are done on the basis of rank of students in Joint Entrance Examination, JEE (Main) conducted by the National Testing Agency (NTA). This examination was previously called Rajasthan Pre-Engineering Test (RPET).

REAP counselling for admission to Undergraduate Programmes in Rajasthan Government funded universities like (MBM University, RTU-Kota), and some private universities offering B.Tech. or B.E, programmes started in the year 2021.

Students seeking admission to B.Tech. or B.E. in Rajasthan State Government institutes like (MBM University, RTU-Kota) and some private universities (except IIT Jodhpur, BITS Pilani, MNIT Jaipur and some other private deemed universities) were required to take REAP.

Online applications (registration) for RPET were invited by the Board of Technical Education, Rajasthan. from eligible candidates of Rajasthan, including the wards of Kashmiri Migrants.On average 1.7 lacs student appear for the exam. Making it Rajasthan's main exam for good engineering colleges.

== History ==
In 2015, the Rajasthan state government cancelled the Rajasthan Pre-Engineering Test in favour of an admissions process through a Centralised Admission Committee (CAC). Eventually, this became the Rajasthan Engineering Admission Process (REAP).

== Structure ==
RPET-2014 consisted of a single examination of three hours duration containing 40 objective type questions each in physics, chemistry and mathematics. The total number of questions were 120 carrying one mark each. There were no negative marking for wrong answers.

== Eligibility criteria for admission ==
- The minimum academic qualification for admission to B.Tech./B.E. program in Rajasthan was an RPET pass with at least 45% marks (40% marks in case of candidates belonging to "SC/ST/ Non Creamy Layer OBC/ Non Creamy Layer SBC" of Rajasthan state) in the subjects combination as given below taken together, in the final examination of 10+2 (Class XII) of Board of Secondary Education, Rajasthan or any other examination recognized equivalent thereto by Board of Secondary Education, Rajasthan/ Central Board of Secondary Education (CBSE).
- Subject combination required in the qualifying examination for admission to B.Tech. / B.E course shall be as under:
  - Compulsory subjects: Physics and Mathematics
  - Any one of the optional subjects:
    - Chemistry
    - Bio-technology
    - Computer Science
    - Biology
