= Vitabiotics =

British vitamin and food supplement brand

Vitabiotics is a British nutraceutical company that specializes in vitamin and mineral based food supplements focused in various health categories, with many including vitamins based on national guidelines for infants, children and during pregnancy to support their contribution to one's health. In July 2013, Vitabiotics became the largest vitamin company in UK by sales value.

The company was founded in 1971 by Kartar Lalvani who is the chairman. He was later joined by his former tutor Professor Arnold Beckett, and the company is now run by his son Tej Lalvani who is the CEO. Lalvani is best known for his appearances on the British reality TV show Dragon's Den.

== Products ==
Vitabiotics brands include supplements in various health categories such as Perfectil (supplement for skin, hair, and nails), Pregnacare, Menopace, Wellkid, Wellbaby, Wellman, and Wellwoman. In 2013 Vitabiotics received a Queen's Award for Innovation in Vitamin Research. It received it again in 2018, becoming the first vitamin company to receive the award twice.

In February 2021, the company partnered with global technology company Alibaba Group and Southeast Asian commerce company Lazada Group to "accelerate growth across China". The brand is targeting 70% growth in the Chinese market.
