= Tej Lalvani =

British businessman and the CEO (born 1974)

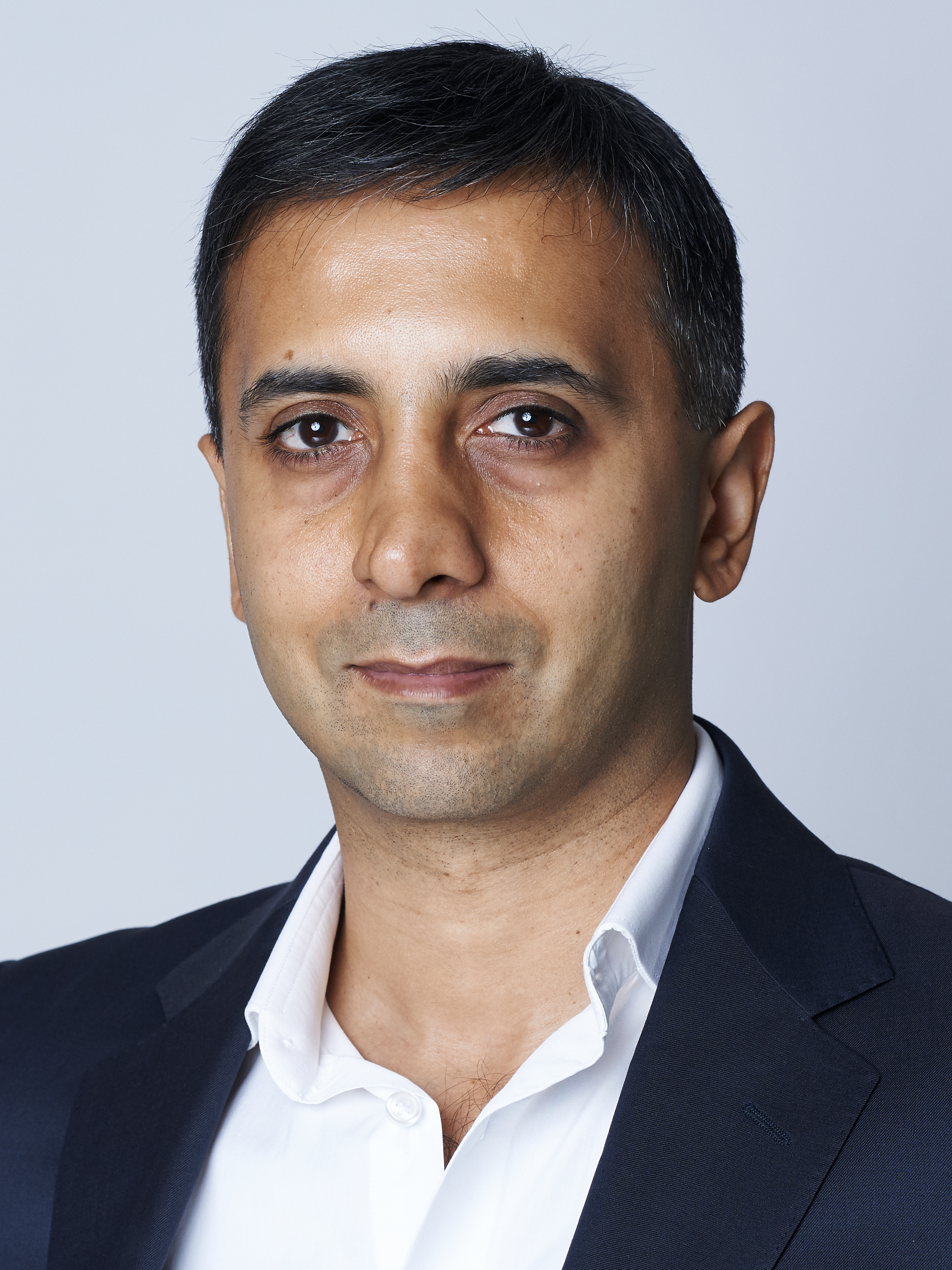
- Lalvani in 2018
- Born: 13 July 1974 (age 51)
- Education: University of Westminster (BA)
- Occupation: Businessman
- Known for: Dragons' Den (2017–2021)
- Title: CEO, Vitabiotics
- Spouse: Tara Ruby (m. 2011)
- Parent: Kartar Lalvani (father)
- Family: Gulu Lalvani (uncle); Dino Lalvani (cousin)
- Website: www.tejlalvani.com

Tej Lalvani (born 13 July 1974) is a British businessman and the CEO of the UK's largest vitamin company Vitabiotics, founded by his father Kartar Lalvani. He is best known for being one of the "Dragons" on the BBC television series Dragons' Den from 2017 to 2021.

== Early life and business career ==
Lalvani grew up in Bangalore, Karnataka, Southern India, and spent his childhood between India and the United Kingdom before settling in London when he was 16. He graduated with a bachelor's degree from Westminster Business School at the University of Westminster in 1996, and started his career working in the warehouse of his father's company Vitabiotics, before succeeding him as CEO.

Along with his wife, Lalvani runs a property investment business in London.

In 2012, Lalvani was named Young Entrepreneur at the Asian Business Awards as well as Young Entrepreneur of the Year by TiE in 2013. In October 2017, he ranked at number 48 on the GG2 Power List of the most influential Asian people in Britain.

In November 2020, Lalvani was included on The Grocer's NPD Power List. He was awarded this based on his contribution to and innovation in the UK grocery industry during the pandemic.

Lalvani shares his business insight and experience across various social platforms - most notably, LinkedIn. In 2020, he was named one of LinkedIn’s ‘Top UK Voices’.

In November 2021, the University of Westminster awarded him with an honorary doctorate. In May 2022, the University of Westminster appointed Lalvani as a visiting professor at Westminster Business School.

== Dragons' Den ==
Lalvani succeeded Nick Jenkins as the next "dragon" on Dragons' Den in 2017.

In January 2021, Lalvani announced his departure from the show to focus on the expansion of his business. Series 18, which was his final series, started in spring 2021.

== Personal life ==
Lalvani is of Indian descent. The Lalvani family is of Sikh Sindhi heritage. In 2011, Lalvani married Tara Ruby in London. His mother is a former Miss India and a Miss World runner-up.

Lalvani lives in London and aside from his business interests, he composes music and plays drums, keyboard and guitar.

According to the Sunday Times Rich List in May 2019, he has a net worth of £390 million.
