= Rajesh Mirchandani =

British Indian television journalist

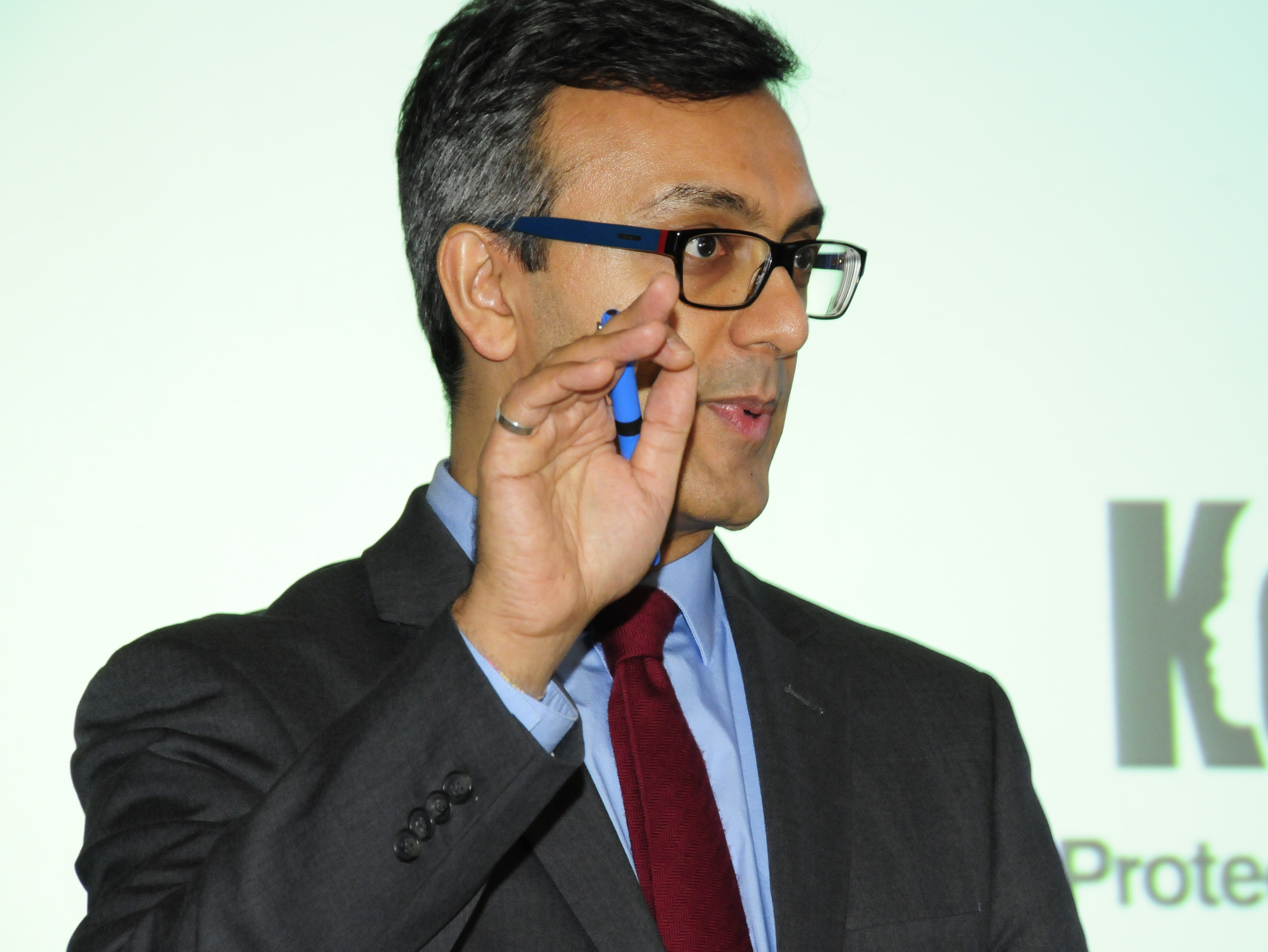
- Mirchandani moderating an event in 2013
- Education: University of Bristol University of Southern California
- Occupation: Communications executive
- Employer: Feeding America
- Known for: Correspondent & host, BBC World News
- Rajesh Mirchandani's voice from the BBC programme From Our Own Correspondent, 16 June 2011.

Rajesh Mirchandani is a communications executive and former British television journalist. He spent more than two decades reporting from around the world as a BBC correspondent and news anchor, covering international events from Typhoon Haiyan in the Philippines to the Academy Awards in Hollywood, for the BBC World Service and BBC World News. From 2018 - 2022, he has worked for the United Nations Foundation as their Chief Communications Officer. In 2022, he joined Feeding America as Chief Communications and Community Engagement Officer.

== Education ==
Mirchandani was educated at the University of Bristol, where he received a BSc in Economics before attending the University of Wales College of Cardiff where he received a diploma in broadcast journalism. In 2012, he received his master's degree in public diplomacy from the Annenberg School for Communication and Journalism at the University of Southern California.

== Career ==
Mirchandani worked for more than two decades as a journalist and broadcaster, reporting and anchoring from around the world for the BBC's global television and radio networks, including BBC World News and the World Service. He has covered a wide range of stories and issues, from two US presidential elections to the Haiti earthquake, AIDS in India to oil exploration in the Arctic, education for displaced children in Colombia to green energy investments in California.

Mirchandani left the BBC in October 2014 to become the Senior Director of Communications for the Center for Global Development. He is regularly invited to participate in high-level events around issues such as the post-2015 development agenda, girls' empowerment, and the changing media landscape. In 2015, he was a speaker at EA Global, an annual conference held by the effective altruism movement.

Mirchandani joined the United Nations Foundation as Chief Communications Officer in January 2018.

In 2022, he joined Feeding America as Chief Communications and Community Engagement Officer. He is also the host of Finding Our Flavor, a podcast about podcast about food and identity.

== Awards ==
He won two awards from the Los Angeles Press Club for his work during six years as a BBC North America correspondent.
