= Binatone =

British telecommunications company

- Industry: Electronics
- Founded: United Kingdom (1958)
- Founder: Partap Lalvani; Gulu Lalvani
- Headquarters: Hong Kong
- Area served: Worldwide
- Products: Landline; Mobile phone Senior phone Two-way radios Baby monitor Tablets; GPS
- Website: www.binatone.com

Binatone is a British-Chinese telecommunications company. Binatone was started in the United Kingdom in 1958 by two brothers, Gulu Lalvani and Partap Lalvani, to import and distribute consumer electronics. The company was named after their sister, Bina. Binatone manufactures products under its own brand apart from utilising the AEG and Motorola brands under licence.

== History ==
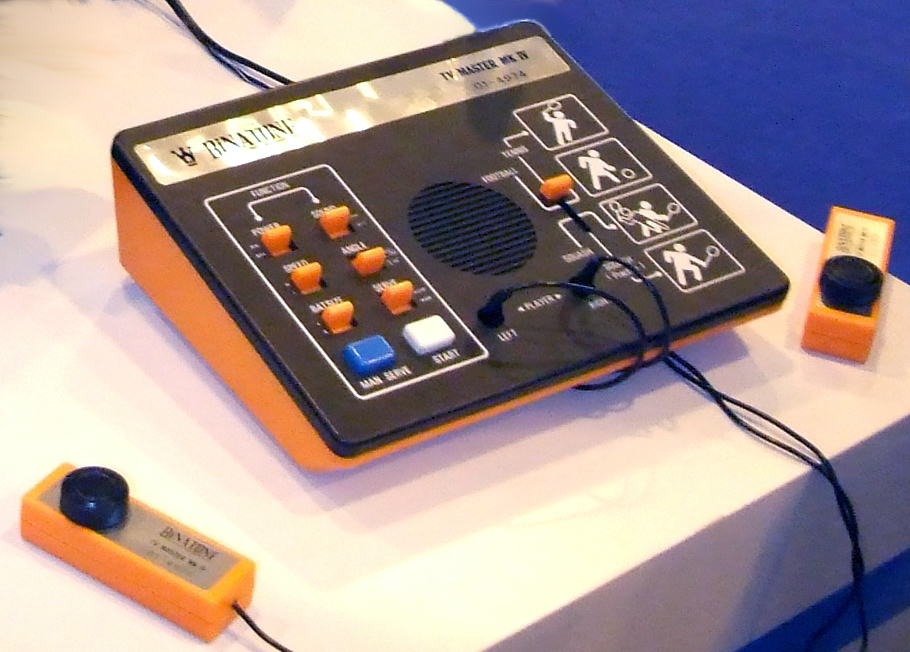
Binatone TV Master Mk IV

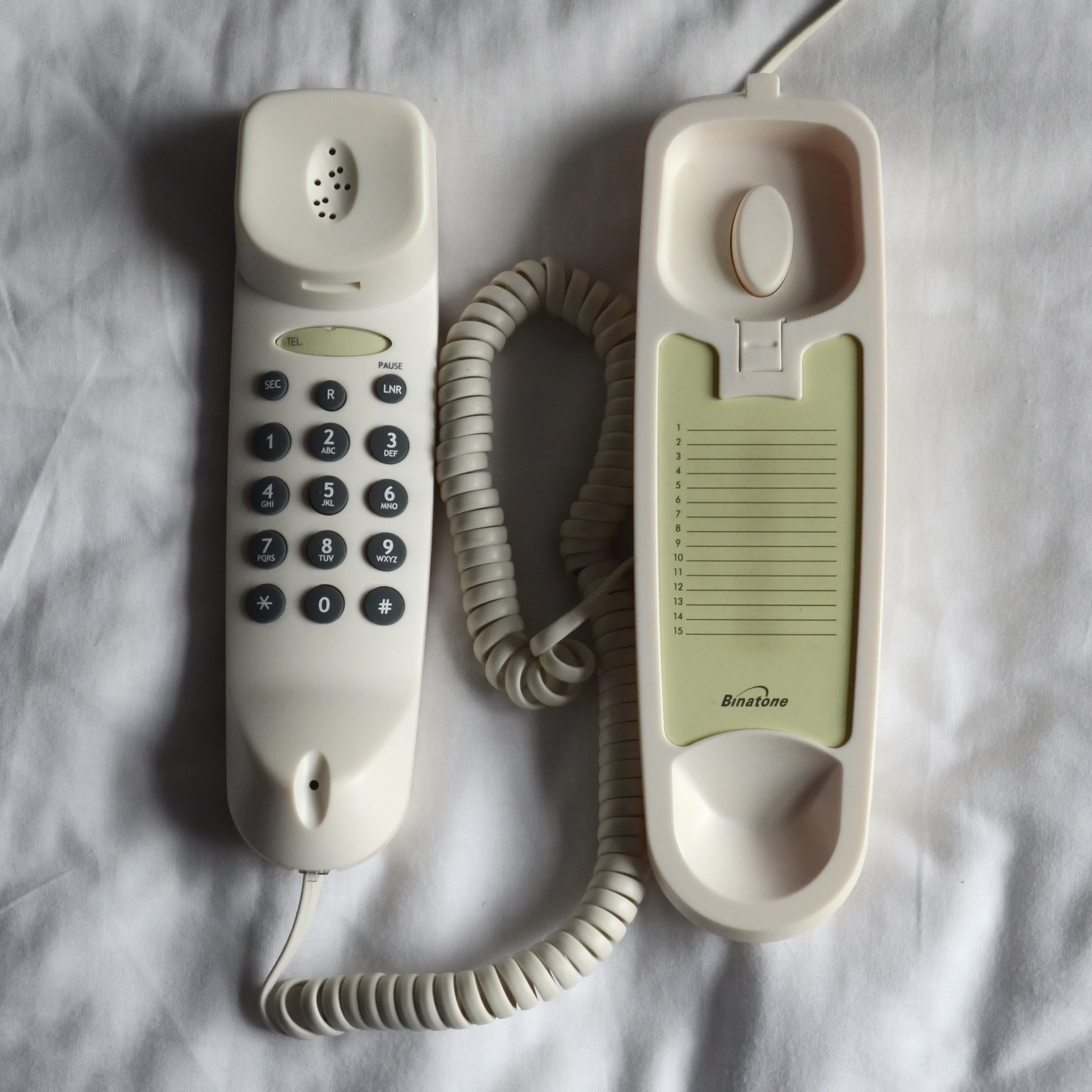
Binatone Trend wall phone from the early 2000s

Between 1976 and 1979, Binatone produced the "Binatone TV Master" series of first generation video game consoles.

In 1983 Binatone was the first in Europe with fixed-line consumer products that could be bought at electronics retailers. This marked the beginning of a gradual change from Binatone's focus on audio and vision to telecom products.

In 2008, Dino Lalvani, son of Gulu Lalvani, purchased the company from his father and took over as chairman.

Binatone was the official shirt sponsor of Queens Park Rangers Football Club from 2003 to 2006.

In 2013, Binatone released ReadMe Mobile, an Android tablet/eReader. The device specializes as an eBook with a keypad, and a non-reflective screen.

Binatone created an N95 mask and combined it with a Bluetooth headset in January 2021. The company unveiled MaskFone at the CES 2021.

== Consoles ==
A very early console was the TV Game unit but the first series was the TV master series which are black & white pongs (first generation).

- TV Master MK IV
- TV Master 4 plus 2
- TV Master MK 6
- TV Master MK 8
- TV Master MK 10

The Colour TV series are the same games but in colour.

- Colour TV Game
- Colour TV Game 4 plus 2
- Colour TV Game MK 6
- Colour TV Game MK 10

== Related brands ==
Binatone markets baby monitors, pet monitors, telephones, headphones and car accessories under the Motorola brand name under an agreement with Motorola Mobility and earlier, Motorola Inc.

Binatone also operates a subsidiary Hubble Connected that acts as a platform for connected devices. It acquired a Bengaluru, India-based startup Connovate in 2014 that merged into Hubble. In 2016, Dino Lalvani announced that Binatone intended to sell 20% of Hubble while shifting its corporate offices from the United States to Bengaluru, India.
