= Rajasthan Technical University =

University in Kota, Rajasthan, India

- Type: Public
- Established: 2006 (20 years ago)
- Affiliations: UGC, AICTE
- Chancellor: Governor of Rajasthan
- Vice-Chancellor: Nimit Ranjan Choudhary
- Location: Kota, Rajasthan, India
- Campus: Urban
- Website: www.rtu.ac.in

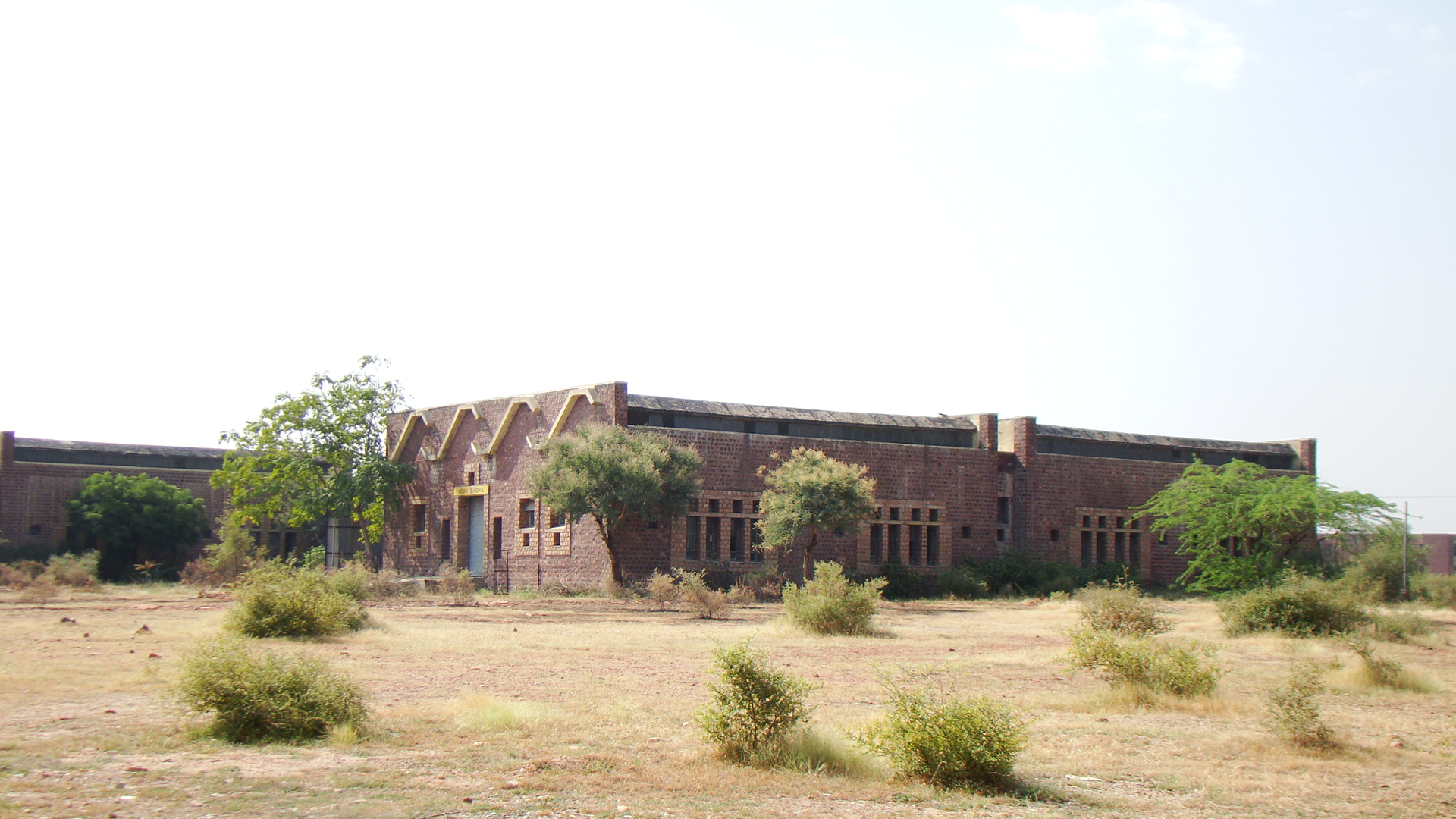

Rajasthan Technical University (RTU) is an affiliating university in Kota in the state of Rajasthan, India. It was established in 2006 by the Government of Rajasthan to enhance technical education in the state. It has many affiliated colleges under its umbrella.

RTU is on the campus of the University Engineering College, Kota, previously Engineering College of Kota and now University Teaching Department which is now an autonomous institute.

The university affiliates about 130 engineering colleges, 4 B.Arch colleges, 41 MCA colleges, 95 MBA colleges, 44 M.Tech colleges and 03 hotel management and catering institutes. More than 2.5 lakh students study in the institutes affiliated to the university.

The university's affiliated colleges offer programmes leading to the degrees of Bachelor of Technology (B.Tech.), Master of Technology (M.Tech.), Master of Business Administration (MBA), Master of Computer Applications (MCA), and Bachelor of Hotel Management and Catering Technology (BHMCT).

== Campus ==
Rajasthan Technical University is on the campus of University Engineering College, Kota (formerly Engineering College, Kota). The campus is at the bank of river Chambal in an area of more than 385 acres.

The campus is on the Rawatbhata Road, about 14 km from Kota Railway Station and 10 km from Kota bus stand. It is approximately 500 kilometres (310 mi) from New Delhi, and about 250 kilometres (160 mi) from the state capital Jaipur.

== Organisation and administration ==
=== Governance ===
The Governor of Rajasthan is the chancellor of the university. Prof. Nimit Ranjan Choudhary was appointed Vice Chancellor (VC) in October 2025.

=== Departments ===
- Aeronautical Engineering
- Ceramic Engineering
- Civil Engineering
- Chemical Engineering
- Computer Science & Engineering
- Electronics & Communication Engineering
- Electrical Engineering
- Electronics Instrumentation & Control Engineering
- Humanities and English Studies
- Information Technology Engineering
- Mathematics
- Mechanical Engineering
- Nano Technology
- Petroleum Engineering
- Petrochemical Engineering
- Production & Industrial Engineering
- Physics Studies
- Management Studies

== Academics ==
RTU is an affiliating university. Its affiliated colleges offer the degrees of Bachelor of Technology (B.Tech), Master of Technology (M.Tech), Master of Business Administration (MBA), Master of Computer Applications (MCA) and Bachelor of Hotel Management and Catering Technology (BHMCT).

As of April 2011, RTU affiliates 202 colleges. B.Tech degrees are offered at nine government aided institutes and 109 are private ones. MBA degrees are offered at seven government aided institutes and 122 are private ones.

MCA degrees are offered in at seven government aided institutes and 25 are private ones. M.Tech is offered in 24 colleges and BHMCT in four colleges. In addition, two colleges offer Bachelor of Architecture (B.Arch) degrees.
