= Sindhis in India =

Socio-ethnic group of people originating from Sindh

Total population
- 2,772,364 (2011 census)

Regions with significant populations
- Gujarat; Maharashtra; Rajasthan; Madhya Pradesh; Chhattisgarh; Delhi; Uttar Pradesh; Assam; Karnataka; Andhra Pradesh; Goa; various other locations

Languages
- Sindhi; Hindi; English; others

Religion
- Hinduism; Minority: Sikhism · Christianity · Islam
- ^aThe census figure only records individuals who speak Sindhi as their first language, rather than the total number of individuals of full or partial Sindhi ancestry.

Sindhis in India, or Indian Sindhis (सिन्धी, سنڌي, Sindhī), refer to a socio-ethnic group of Sindhi people living in the Republic of India, originating from Sindh region.

After the 1947 Partition of India into the dominions of the new Muslim-majority Pakistan and remaining Hindu-majority India, a million non-Muslim Sindhis migrated to independent India. As per the 2011 census of India, there are 2,772,364 Sindhi speakers in the Indian Republic. However, this number does not include ethnic Sindhis who no longer speak the language and also includes Kutchis who may not identify as ethnic Sindhis (especially those in Gujarat).

Apart from the migrants from Sindh province, Sindhis are also present in significant number in the western region of Barmer district, especially in Chohtan and Ramsar tehsils.

== History ==
Sindhi people have lived in the western part of India even before the partition of India in 1947. The regions such as Kutch, Kathiawad (Saurashtra), Jaisalmer, and Barmer have historically shared borders with Sindh (now in Pakistan). This geographical proximity contributed to the migration and settlement of Sindhi people in these regions over centuries, likely starting from ancient times since the Indus Valley Civilization period.

=== Sindhi Muslims ===
Many Sindhi Muslims have been living in western India for a long time, and even after the partition, they chose to reside there. Some of these muslim Sindhis migrated for trade, jobs, herding and farming. Among them, the Sindhi Muslims of Gujarat and the Sindhi Sipahi of Rajasthan are particularly well-known.

=== Sindhi Hindus ===
Many of the Sindhi Hindus migrated to India after partition in 1947. They were settled in military camps in different cities of India.

=== Sindhi Sikhs ===
With the teachings of Guru Nanak during one of his travels to Sindh, many Hindu Sindhis adopted Sikhism. Many Hindu Sindhi women learned the Gurmukhī alphabet to enable them to read the Guru Granth Sahib. Many Amils, a sect of Hindu Sindhis, adopted Sikhism. There used to be a time, before the partition of India, when many non-Muslim Sindhis were Sehajdhari/Nanakpanthi Sikhs.

During the early 1900s, the Chief Khalsa Diwan of Amritsar sent out missionary groups once a year to Sindh to work among the Sehajdhari Sindhis. Over a period of 30 years, with scarce resources, this missionary activity increased from 1,000 Keshdhari Sindhis in 1901 to over 39,000 in 1941, a significant number in those days.

The bond of the Sehajdhari Sindhis with Sikhism is legendary. Like the Sikhs of Punjab, the Sehajdhari Sikhs of Sindh also left behind their homeland and are now dispersed all over India and abroad. Their main pilgrimage centres are Nankana Sahib and Dera Sahib in Punjab, and Sadh Bela near Sukkur in Sindh. Sadh Bela is an Udasi shrine built in 1823.

== Independence of India and Partition of India ==
After the Partition of India, the majority of the minority Hindus and Sikhs in Pakistan migrated to India, while the Muslim migrants from India settled down in Pakistan. Approximately 10 million Hindus and Sikhs migrated to India, while nearly an equal number of Muslims migrated to newly created Pakistan from India. Hindu Sindhis were expected to stay in Sindh following the partition, as there were good relations between Hindu and Muslim Sindhis. At the time of partition, there were 1,400,000 Hindu Sindhis, though most were concentrated in cities such as Hyderabad, Karachi, Shikarpur, and Sukkur. However, many Sindhi Hindus decided to leave Pakistan.

Problems were further aggravated when incidents of violence broke out in Karachi after partition. According to the census of India 1951, nearly 776,000 Sindhi Hindus were forced to migrate to India. Despite this migration of Hindus, a significant Sindhi Hindu population still resides in Pakistan's Sindh province where they numbered around 2.28 million in 1998 and 4.21 million as per the 2017 census of Pakistan, while the Sindhi Hindus in India numbered 2.57 million in 2001. As of 2011 population was around 2.77 million out of which around 1.7 million (17 lakh) speak Sindhi and around 1 million speak Kachchhi.

The responsibility of rehabilitating migrants was borne by their respective governments. Camps for Migrant were set up for Hindu Sindhis. Many people abandoned their fixed assets and crossed newly formed borders. Many migrants overcame the trauma of poverty, though the loss of a homeland has had a stronger and lasting effect on their Sindhi culture. In 1967, the Government of India recognized the Sindhi language as a fifteenth official language of India in two scripts. In late 2004, the Sindhi diaspora vociferously opposed a Public Interest Litigation in the Supreme Court of India, which asked the Government of India to delete the word "Sindh" from the Indian National Anthem (written by Rabindranath Tagore before the partition) because it infringed upon the sovereignty of Pakistan.

== Resettlement of migrants ==
=== Adipur ===
Soon after the partition of Pakistan from India in 1947, a large group of migrants from Sindh in Pakistan came to India. Adipur was founded by the Indian government as a Migrant camp. Its management was later passed onto a self-governing body called the Sindhu Resettlement Corporation (SRC). The person credited with the formation of this settlement was Bhai Pratap Dialdas, who requested the land from Mohandas Gandhi for the mostly Sindhi immigrants from Pakistan. 15,000 acres (61 km^{2}) of land was donated by the Maharaj of Kutch, His Highness Maharao Shri Vijayrajji Khengarji Jadeja, at the request of Mohan Das Gandhi, because it was felt that the climate and culture of Kutch resembled that of Sindh. Adipur, like Gandhidham, was built on the donated land to rehabilitate Hindu Sindhi migrants coming from Sindh. The Indian Institute of Sindhology established at Adipur, Gandhidham (Kutch), is a centre for advanced studies and research in fields related to the Sindhi language .

=== Ahmedabad ===
Ahmedabad's population increased dramatically when many households and individuals of Hindu Sindhi descendants arrived from Pakistan to migrate to Ahmedabad. Kubernagar was established with barracks (houses), which were allocated to the migrants who arrived in Ahmedabad.

=== Gandhidham ===
The Maharaja of Kutch, His Highness Maharao Shri Vijayrajji Khengarji Jadeja, at the request of Mohandas Gandhi, gave 15,000 acres (61 km^{2}) of land to Bhai Pratap, who founded the Sindhu Resettlement Corporation to rehabilitate Sindhi Hindus uprooted from their motherland. The Sindhi Resettlement Corporation (SRC) was formed with Acharaya Kriplani as chairman and Bhai Pratap Dialdas as managing director. The main objective of the corporation was to assist in the rehousing of displaced persons by the construction of a new town on a site a few miles inland from the location selected by the Government of India for the new port of Kandla on the Gulf of Kachchh. The first plan was prepared by a team of planners headed by Dr O. H. Koenigsberger, director of the Government of India's division of housing. This plan was subsequently revised by Adams, Howard and Greeley Company in 1952. The town's foundation stone was laid with the blessings of Mohandas Gandhi, and hence the town was named Gandhidham.

=== Ulhasnagar ===
Ulhasnagar, Maharashtra is a municipal town and the headquarters of the Tehsil bearing the same name. It is a railway station on the Mumbai-Pune route of the Central Railway. Ulhasnagar, a colony of Sindhi Hindu migrants, is 61 years old. Situated 58 km from Mumbai, the once-barren land has developed into a town in the Thane district, Maharashtra. Originally, known as Kalyan Military transit camp (or Kalyan Camp), Ulhasnagar was set up especially to accommodate 6,000 soldiers and 30,000 others during World War II. There were 2,126 barracks and about 1,173 housed personnel. The majority of barracks had large central halls with rooms attached to either end. The camp had a deserted look at the end of the war and served as a ready and ideal ground for the partition migrants. Sindhi migrants, in particular, began life anew in Ulhasnagar after the partition of India.

=== Cox Town, Bangalore ===
Migrant Sindhi Hindus from Hyderabad migrated to Bangalore through Mumbai and Goa. A community housing society was created in Cox Town, with a temple, Sindhi Association and a Sindhi Social Hall, a community hub for celebrations, marriages and festivals such as Holi and Guru Nanak Jayanti. The immigration of the community resulted in the introduction of Sindhi culture and cuisine to the city.

== Official status of the Sindhi language ==
Although Sindhi was not a regional language in a well-defined area, there were persistent demands from the Sindhi-speaking people for the inclusion of Sindhi language in the Eighth Schedule of the Constitution. The Commissioner for Linguistic Minorities also recommended the inclusion. On 4 November 1966, it was announced that the Government had decided to include the Sindhi language in the Eighth Schedule of the Indian Constitution. At the 2001 census, there were 2,571,526 Sindhi speakers in India.

== Present day ==
The Sindhi people live mainly in the north-western part of India. Many Sindhis inhabit the states of Rajasthan, Gujarat, Maharashtra and Madhya Pradesh as well as the Indian capital of New Delhi. Most Sindhis of India follow the Hindu religion (90%), although Sindhi Sikhs are a prominent minority (5-10%). There are many Sindhis living in various cities in India, including Jalgaon (MH), Ulhasnagar (MH), Kalyan (MH), Mumbai, Mumbai Suburban, Thane, Pune, Gandhidham, Surat, Vadodara, Rajkot, Jamnagar, Adipur, Gandhinagar, Ahmedabad, Bhavnagar, Bhopal (Bairagarh), Ajmer, Jaisalmer, Delhi, Chandigarh, Jaipur, Bangalore, Visakhapatnam, Hyderabad, Chennai, Raipur, Indore, Gondia, Nagpur, Jabalpur, Katni (MP), Narsinghpur, Satna (MP), Sagar, Rewa, Bilaspur, Dhule, Maihar, Itarsi, Aurangabad (MH), Kolkata, Lucknow, Kanpur, Agra, Varanasi, National Capital Region, etc.

Population break up by states (Census of India 2011)
State	Population	% of total
Gujarat	1,184,000	42.7%
Maharashtra	724,000	26.1%
Rajasthan	387,000	13.9%
Madhya Pradesh	245,000	8.8%
Chhattisgarh	93,000	3.4%
Delhi	31,000	1.1%
Uttar Pradesh	29,000	1.0%
Assam	20,000	0.7%
Karnataka	17,000	0.6%
Andhra Pradesh	11,000	0.4%

Sindhi people have been involved in various sector of India's economy. Business groups associated with the community include the Hinduja Group, Raheja Developers and the Hiranandani Group.

== Sindhi culture ==
=== Sindhi cuisine ===
Sindhi cuisine is quite popular all over India. Sindhis have unique traditional dishes which the cook.

=== Sindhi festivals ===
Sindhis are very festive. Their most important festival is Cheti Chand, the birthday of Lord Jhulelal. Besides this, they celebrate Akhand teej (Akshaya Tritiya) and Teejri (Teej).

== Institutes established by Sindhi Hindus ==
Following is the list of Institutes, Colleges, Universities established and run by Sindhi Hindus in India and abroad.

- D. J. Sindh Government Science College
- Narayan Jagannath High School

Institute Name	Type	Language of instruction	Location	Founder	Founded	Notes
Hyderabad (Sind) National Collegiate Board (Sindhi: حيدرآباد (سنڌ) نيشنل ڪاليجيئيٽ بورڊ)	Education, Nonprofit organization	English	Ahmedabad	Principal Khushiram Motiram Kundnani & Late Barrister Hotchand Gopaldas Advani	1922	To be at the frontline of human knowledge and work towards the fulfilment of cultural, scientific, intellectual and humane needs of society in general and students in particular; to enrich and enhance the economic vitality and quality of life, while being firmly rooted in the rich Indian ethos and belief
C. H. M. College (Sindhi: چندِيٻائي هِمٿمل منسُکاڻي ڪاليج)	College	English	Ulhasnagar, Mumbai, Maharashtra, India	Principal K.M. Kundnani & Barrister Hotchand G. Advani	1 January 1964	Starting as an institution to cater to the aspirations of the minority Sindhi community, after being displaced from their native land Sindh, now in Pakistan because of the partition of India on 15 August 1947.
Thadomal Shahani Engineering College (Sindhi: ٿڌومل شاهاڻِي انجنيئرنگ ڪاليج)	Education and Research Institution	English	Bandra, Mumbai, Maharashtra, India	HSNC Board	1983	Named by one of Mumbai's most respected philanthropists, Dada Kishinchand T Shahani, after his father, Thadomal Shahani.
Vivekanand Education Society (Sindhi: ويويڪانند ايجوڪيشن سوسائٽي)	Education and Research Institution	English, Marathi, Hindi	Chembur, Mumbai, Maharashtra, India	Vivekanand Education Society Trust	1962	Established by social worker and educationist Hashu Advani, VES today manages several schools, colleges, and professional institutes, including VES College of Arts, Science & Commerce, VES Institute of Technology, and VES Institute of Management Studies and Research.
Kishinchand Chellaram College (Sindhi: ڪشنچند چيلارام ڪاليج)	College	English	Mumbai	HSNC Board	1954	It was the second institution that the Management set up in Bombay after it relocated itself in the city, following the aftermath of Partition. The onus of the task was taken up by the late founders, principal K.M. Kundnani and barrister Hotchand Advani, who helped set up K.C. College and several other educational institutions. Kundnani and Advani were the pillars of that board.
Smt. M.M.K College of Commerce & Economics (Sindhi: مٺِي ٻائي مُوتيرام ڪُندناڻِي ڪاليج)	College	English	Bandra, Mumbai, Maharashtra, India		1961	
R. D. National College (Sindhi: رِشي دَيارام نيشنل ڪاليج)	College	English	Linking Road Bandra, Mumbai	HSNC Board	1922 at Hyderabad, Sindh & reestablished in 1949 in India	

== Notable people ==
- Lalkrishna Advani, Former Deputy Prime Minister of India
- Ishwardas Rohani, an Indian politician
- Lakhumal Hiranand Hiranandani, an otorhinolaryngologist (head and neck surgeon), social activist and philanthropist
- G. P. Sippy, a Bollywood film producer and director

== See also ==
- Sindhi diaspora
- Sindhis
- Sindhi language
- List of Sindhi people
- Sindhi Hindus
- Sindhi Colony, Secunderabad
