= K.M. Kundnani =

Educationist of India

Khushiram Motiram Kundnani
- Born: 24 August 1904; Hyderabad, Sindh, British India
- Died: 7 November 1992 (aged 88); Mumbai, Maharashtra, India
- Education: D.J. Sindh College, Royal Institute of Science, Mumbai
- Occupation: Educationist
- Works: Founded colleges and Institutions in Mumbai, India.
- Title: Founder Secretary of Hyderabad (Sind) National Collegiate Board, Principal of various colleges

Khushiram Motiram Kundnani (24 August 1904 - 7 November 1992), popularly known as Principal K.M. Kundnani, was an eminent educationist of India. Born in Hyderabad, Sindh, he was the founder secretary of the Hyderabad (Sind) National Collegiate Board and founder principal of Kishinchand Chellaram (K.C.) College, Churchgate and R.D. National College & S.W.A. Science College, Bandra.

== Early life and education ==
K.M. Kundnani was born on 24 August 1904 at Hyderabad Sindh, British India (Now Pakistan). His father Motiram Kundnani was a humble soul and saint. He received early education at Hyderabad and then studied at D.J. Sindh College Karachi and Elphinstone College Bombay (now Mumbai). He was a brilliant student and always stood first in his studies. He was also interested in indoor and outdoor games and represented the University of Bombay several times. He obtained M.Sc. degree in Physics from Royal Institute of Science, Mumbai. Being deeply involved in sports, he became Chairman of the Inter-Collegiate Sports Committee and General Secretary for intergroup sports of the University of Bombay (Now University of Mumbai). He had also qualified as director of Physical Education from the YMCA College in Madras. In 1932, he joined the first Indian Himalayan Expedition Club, with excursions to Pindari and Kolahoi glaciers in consecutive years.

== Contributions ==
He joined the D.G. College (Now Government College University), Hyderabad as a lecturer in 1930 and became principal of the same college in 1947. After partition of the British India, he moved to Mumbai and established the Rishi Dayaram Gidumal National College at Bandra in 1949, with critical assistance from Advocate Hotchand Gopaldas Advani. This was the first college of the Sindhi community in India. This college was established by the Hyderabad (Sind) National Collegiate Board. Advocate Hotchand Gopaldas Advani was the founder president and Principal Kundnani was founder General Secretary of this board. After death of Hotchand Gopaldas Advani, on 9 May 1991, Kundnani took over as the president of the board.

Under the umbrella of the board, Kundnani established Kishinchand Chellaram (K.C.) College at Churchgate, Mumbai in 1954. Afterwards, he established H.R. College of Commerce, K.C. Law College, C.M.H. College, B.Ed College of Education, Dr L H Hiranandani College of Pharmacy (Pharmacy College), Gopaldas Advani Law College, M.M.K. College, Thagomal Shahani Engineering College, Principal K. M. Kundnani College of Pharmacy (KMKCP) and other colleges.

== Honors and awards ==
- Golden Plate by the Education Minister, Government of Maharashtra, India
- Gold Medal by the Governor of Maharashtra

== Death ==
K.M. Kundnani died on 7 November 1992 in Mumbai.
