= Hyderabad (Sind) National Collegiate Board =

Indian educational trust

Hyderabad (Sind Pakistan) National Collegiate Board
- Founded: 1922; 104 years ago
- Founder: Principal K.M. Kundnani; Barrister H.G. Advani
- Type: Education, Nonprofit organisation
- Purpose: To be at the frontline of human knowledge and work towards the fulfillment of cultural, scientific, intellectual and humane needs of society in general and students in particular; to enrich and enhance the economic vitality and quality of life, while being firmly rooted in the rich Indian ethos and belief
- Location: Mumbai, Maharashtra, India
- Region served: Mumbai, Maharashtra, India
- Key people: Niranjan Hiranandani - Trustee and Past President; Kishu Mansukhani- President; Indu Shahani - Director - Academics

The Hyderabad (Sind) National Collegiate Board or HSNC Board (Sindhi: حيدرآباد (سنڌ) نيشنل ڪاليجيئيٽ بورڊ HSNCB) is an Indian non-profit organisation founded in 1922 (or 1919) in the British India province of Sind and moved to Bombay, India after the 1947 Partition. It is one of the oldest educational trusts of India and currently administers 27 institutes under its umbrella including the HSNC University, Mumbai.

== History ==
The Hyderabad (Sind) National Collegiate Board, well known as HSNC board, is a charitable trust established by the Sindhi Community in 1922. It currently manages and administers 27 institutes under its umbrella and is presided by Mr Kishu Mansukhani.

The first college established by this Board in post-independence India was the Rishi Dayaram Gidumal National College or R. D. National College (commonly known as National College) founded in 1949 and located on Linking Road, Bandra.

However, the R.D. National College, Bandra traces its roots back to the D.G. National College that was established in 1917 at Hyderabad, Sind of Bombay Presidency, by the Sindhi-speaking Hindu community, under the inspiration of Dr. Annie Besant, President of Theosophical Society and Rishi Dayaram Gidumal, a Sindhi Hindu religious leader. It was first named as "Sind National Arts College Hyderabad" and inaugurated on 1 October 1917 at Besant Hall, Hyderabad by Dr. Ernest Wood who also became its first Principal. It was registered by the HSNC Board in February 1919 and was affiliated with Bombay University in 1921 to offer B.A. and later, B.Sc. degrees. In 1928, it was renamed to Dayaram Gidumal National College, Hyderabad (Sind) (or in short, 'D.G. National College') and remained so until 1947 when Partition happened. Some of its famous Alumni included the veteran BJP leader L. K. Advani. In 1930, Mr. K.M. Kundnani joined D.G. National College as Lecturer and became the Principal in 1947. After Partition, Mr. Kundnani moved to India and re-established the college in Bandra, Mumbai in 1949, with critical assistance from Advocate H.G. Advani. In fact, the entire HSNC Board was also moved from Hyderabad to Bombay along with its equipment, books and movable possessions and was re-established in Bombay.

The college that remained in Pakistan was suspended during 1947-1948 and got renamed as Government College Hyderabad (a.k.a. Kali Mori College) as it was taken over by the Government of Sind, Pakistan. In 2017, the Government of Sindh, Pakistan announced that it shall be upgraded to a University, as it completed one century of existence.

As of 2020, HSNC University has come into existence. It is a cluster university consisting of three prestigious colleges of the board; namely, KC College, HR College & Bombay Teacher's training Institute (BTTI). The University was launched on 11 June by Mr. Bhagat Singh Koshyari, the then-Governor of Maharashtra, in presence of Mr. Uddhav Thackeray, the Then-Chief Minister of Maharashtra

== Colleges ==
The HSNCB has founded and operates several other educational institutions in India

=== Churchgate Campus, Mumbai ===
- Kishinchand Chellaram College
- Kishinchand Chellaram Law College
- H.R. College of Commerce and Economics

=== Bandra Campus, Mumbai ===
- Rishi Dayaram and Seth Hassaram National College and Seth Wassiamul Assomul Science College
- Mithibai Motiram Kundnani College of Commerce & Economic
- Gopaldas Jhamatmal Advani Law College
- Thadomal Shahani Engineering College

=== Ulhasnagar Campus ===
- Watumull Institute of Electronic Engineering, Computer Technology and Instrumentation
- The Smt Chandibai Himathmal Mansukhani College of Arts, Commerce and Science
- Dr. L.H. Hiranandani College Of Pharmacy

== Famous alumni ==
=== Politicians & Government ===
- L. K. Advani, one of the co-founders of the Bharatiya Janata Party and former Deputy Prime Minister of India
- Piyush Goyal, Politician & Union Cabinet Minister (Railways, Commerce, etc.)
- Ram Naik, Indian politician and Governor of Uttar Pradesh
- Navjot Singh Sidhu, Former cricketer & Member of Parliament
- Aaditya Thackeray, Indian politician & Cabinet minister in Government of Maharashtra
- Amin Khandwani, Chairperson of the Maharashtra State Minority Commission
- Nirmala Samant-Prabhavalkar, Chairperson, Maharashtra State Women's Commission

=== Lawyers & Judges ===
- Justice A.M Khanwilkar, Judge, Supreme Court of India
- Justice P.B Colabavala, Judge, Bombay High Court
- Justice Aloysius Aguiar, Additional Judge, Bombay High Court
- Sanjay Hegde, Senior Advocate, Supreme Court of India
- Ramnath Kini, Bombay High Court Advocate
- Majid Memon, Bombay High Court Advocate

=== Film & TV Persons ===
- Suresh Wadkar, Famous playback singer
- Shaan (singer), Pop and playback singer
- Amjad Khan (actor), Stage and film actor noted for his comedian and villain roles (e.g. as "Gabbar Singh" in the iconic Hindi movie "Sholay")
- Javed Jaffrey, Film actor and comedian
- Rajesh Khanna, Famous Actor and Member of Parliament
- R. Madhavan, Film actor
- Varun Dhawan, Celebrated actor
- Karan Johar, Noted film director
- Ranbir Kapoor, Celebrated actor
- Neil Nitin Mukesh, Noted actor
- Ranveer Singh, Celebrated actor
- Sajid Nadiadwala, Film producer
- Farhan Akhtar, Film director, actor & producer
- Tanmay Bhat, Comedian & founder of AIB

=== Corporate Leaders ===
- Anil Ambani, Chairman of the Anil Dhirubhai Ambani Group (Reliance ADAG Group)
- Kumar Mangalam Birla, Chairman, Aditya Birla Group
- Vikram Limaye, MD & CEO of the National Stock Exchange
- Rashesh Shah, Chairman, CEO and founder of Edelweiss Group; former president of FICCI
- Gautam Singhania, Chairman & MD, Raymonds Textiles)
- Kishore Biyani, Founder & CEO, Future Group (Big Bazaar & others)
- S. P. Hinduja, Chairman, Hinduja Group
- Nanik Rupani, Chairperson of the FICCI
- Avani Davda, MD of Godrej Nature's Basket
- Anant Bajaj, Ex-MD of Bajaj Electricals
- Anshuman Ruia, Director, Essar Group
- Deena Mehta, Ex-President, Bombay Stock Exchange
- Prashant Ruia, Managing Director, Essar Steel
- Ajay Chandwani, Managing Director, Lintas
- Paritosh Joshi, TV executive & former president, Star India
- Sunil Lulla, CEO of BARC India & Former Group CEO of Balaji Telefilms

=== Others ===
- Hari Mehra, President of the Khar Gymkhana Club
- Brij Narayan, Noted Sarod player
- Dr. Indira Hinduja, Gynaecologist and pioneer in In-Vitro fertilisation in South Asia

== Sources ==
- Amilan Jo Ahwal (1919) - Translated into English ("A History of the Amils") at www.saibaba-fund.org/sindhis.html
