= Dinshaw Wachha Road =

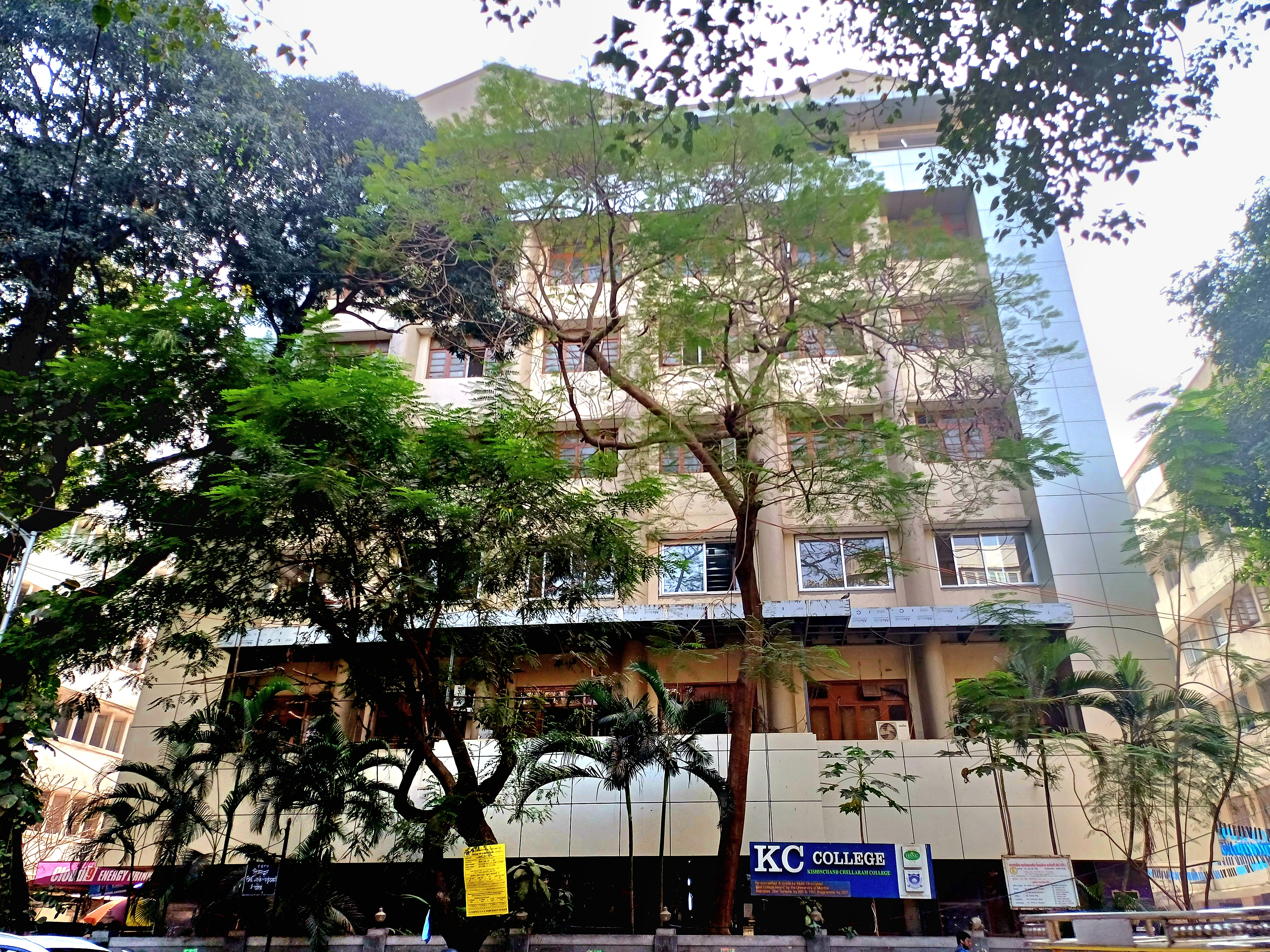
Kishinchand Chellaram College, a premier higher educational institute, located on Dinshaw Wacha Road, Churchgate

Dinshaw Wacha Road is a road in Mumbai, India located between Churchgate and Mantralaya. It houses some of the most prominent residential, educational and sports institutions in South Mumbai, connecting Oval Maidan to Marine Drive promenade. The road is named after Sir Dinshaw Wacha, a prominent Parsi politician who was one of the founding members (and later President) of the Indian National Congress.

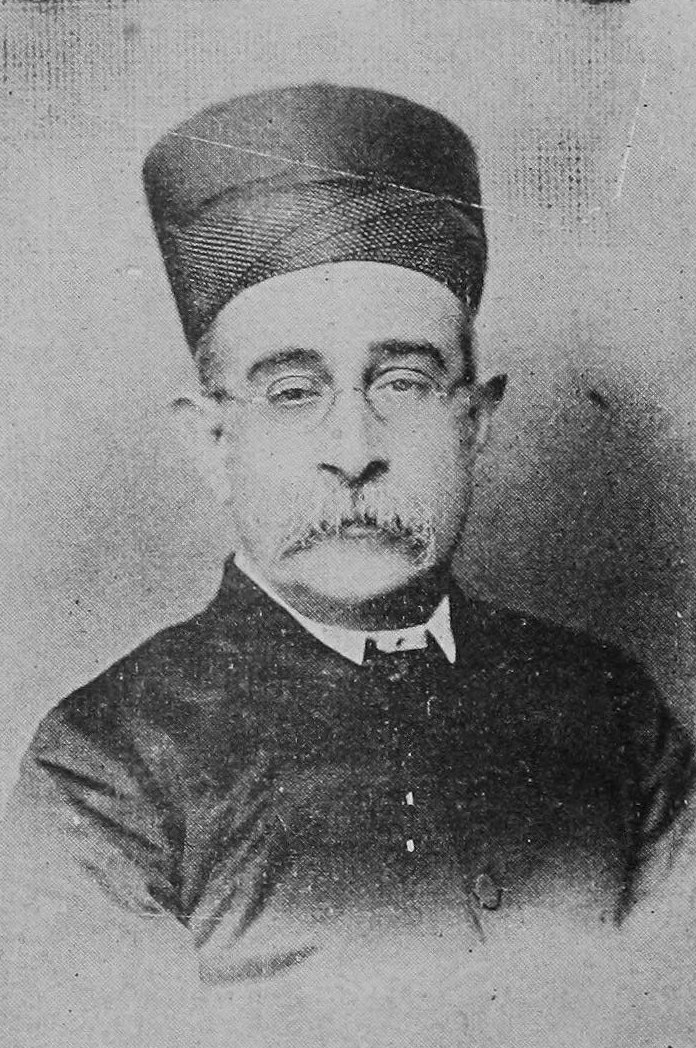
Sir Dinshaw Wacha, prominent politician and founding member of Indian National Congress, on whom the road is named.

The road is also known as Dinshaw Vaccha Road.

== Cricket Connection ==
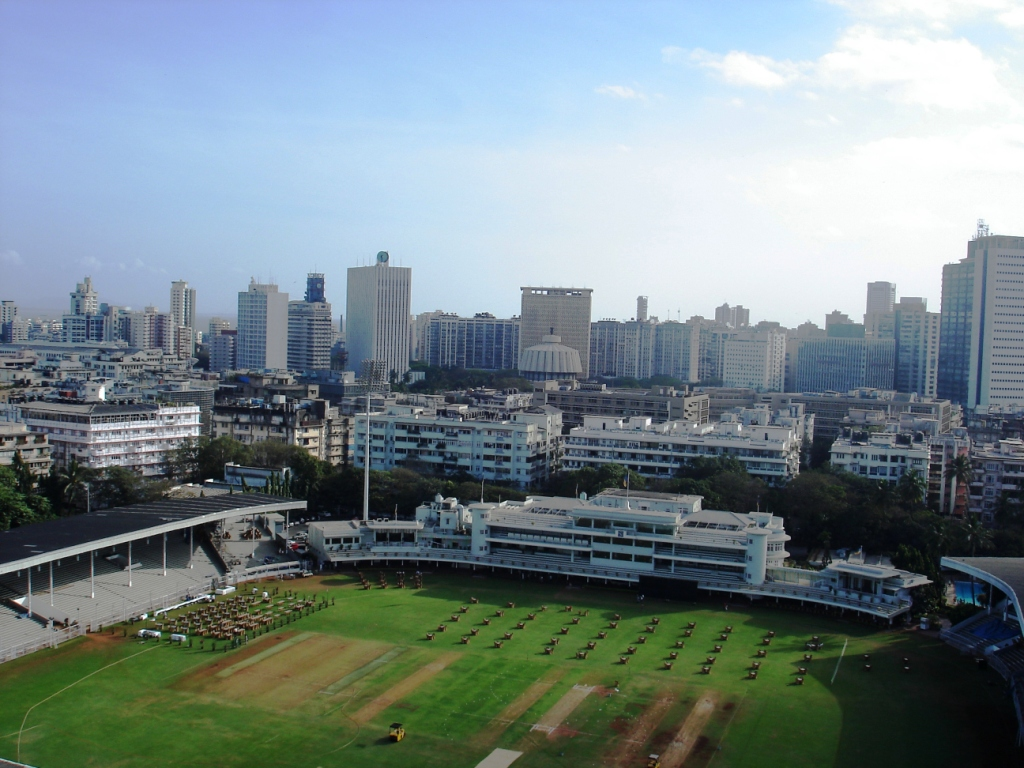
Brabourne Stadium, the former headquarters of BCCI and host of Cricket Club of India (CCI)

Dinshaw Wacha Road famously houses the Brabourne stadium which is one of the two big cricket grounds in Mumbai City. The stadium's members only entrance is located on this road, whereas the regular "general" entrance opens up on Veer Nariman Road. The stadium currently hosts Cricket Club of India (CCI), one of the most prestigious clubs in India and, was conceived as India's counterpart to the Marylebone Cricket Club (MCC). It is the erstwhile headquarters of Board of Control of Cricket in India (BCCI) that was later shifted to Wankhade Stadium, a bigger stadium located a few streets away.

== Points of interest ==
Some institutions located along this road are:

1. Kishinchand Chellaram College; popularly known as KC College.
2. Hassaram Rijhumal College of Commerce and Economics; popularly known as HR College.
3. Kishinchand Chellaram Law College; popularly known as KC Law College.
4. Brabourne stadium, one of two cricket grounds in south Mumbai.
5. Cricket Club of India; popularly known as CCI.
