= Evani =

Evani is both a surname and a given name. Notable people with the name include:

- Alberico Evani (born 1963), Italian footballer and manager
- Evani Esperance (born 1990), Surinamese footballer
- Evani Soares da Silva (born 1989), Brazilian paralympic boccia player

== See also ==
- Avani (given name)
- Evans (surname)
