= Avati =

Avati is a surname. Notable people with the surname include:

- Pupi Avati (born 1938), Italian film director, producer, and screenwriter
- Joe Avati (born 1974), Italian-Australian comedian
- James Avati (1912–2005), American illustrator

== See also ==
- Avani (given name)
