= D. J. Sindh Government Science College =

University in Karachi, Pakistan

- ڈی جے سندھ گورنمنٹ سائنس کالج
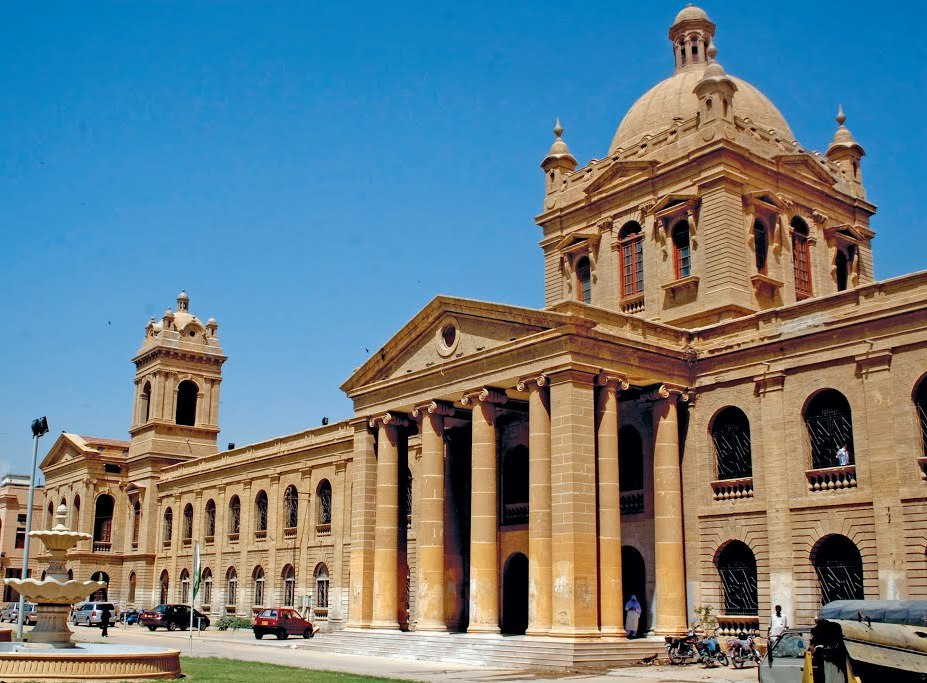
- Type: Intermediate (Pre-Engineering & Pre-Medical) and Undergraduate (B. Sc. – Mathematics, Physics, Chemistry, Geology, Statistics, Microbiology, Biochemistry, Botany & Zoology)
- Established: 17 January 1887
- Affiliations: Board of Intermediate Education Karachi and University of Karachi
- Principal: Prof. Muhammad Mohsin Shaikh
- Location: Dr. Ziauddin Ahmed road, Pakistan Chowk, Saddar Town, Karachi, Sindh, Pakistan
- Campus: Urban
- Website: https://www.djsciencecollege.com

D.J. Sindh Government Science College (Sindhi: ڊي جي سنڌ ڪاليج ڪراچي, Urdu: ڈی جے سندھ گورنمنٹ سائنس کالج), is a public college, affiliated with the University of Karachi. It was named after the philanthropist Diwan Dayaram Jethmal and is located near Burns Road, Karachi, Sindh, Pakistan.

== History ==
The college was founded by the Viceroy of India Lord Dufferin on 19 November 1887 and was originally called Sind Arts college.

In 1889-90, Doulatram Jethmal and Bulchand Dayaram, donated an amount of Rs. 25,000 on a set of conditions one of which being that the college be called Dayaram Jethmal Sind College.

== Premises ==
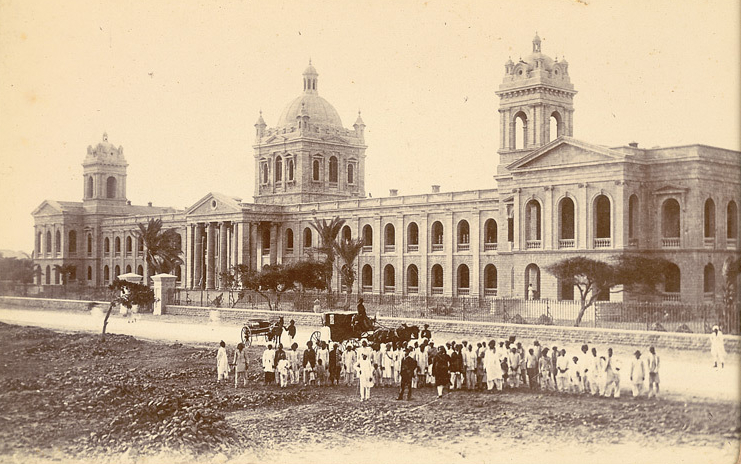
D. J. Science College in the 19th century

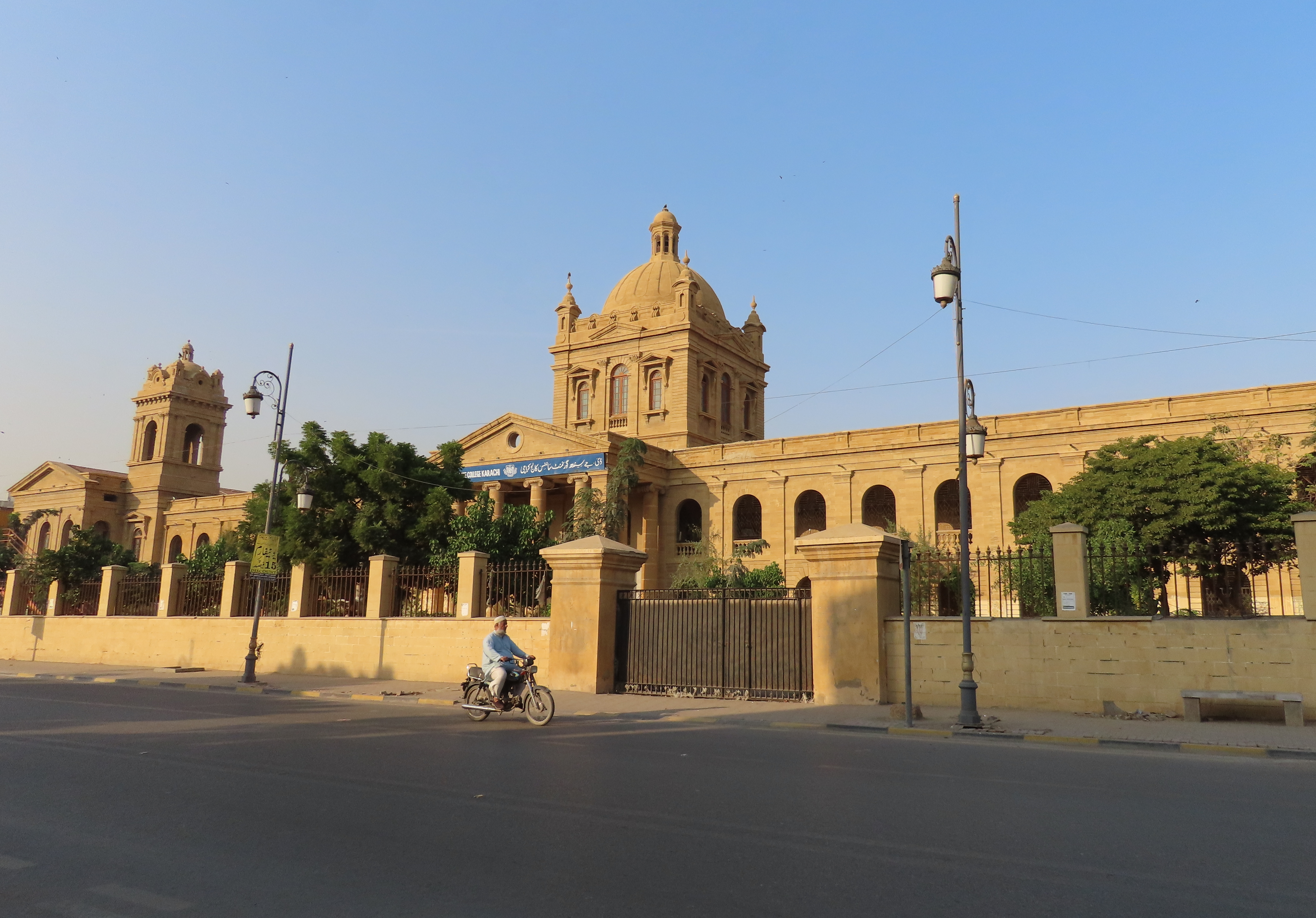
D.J. Science College

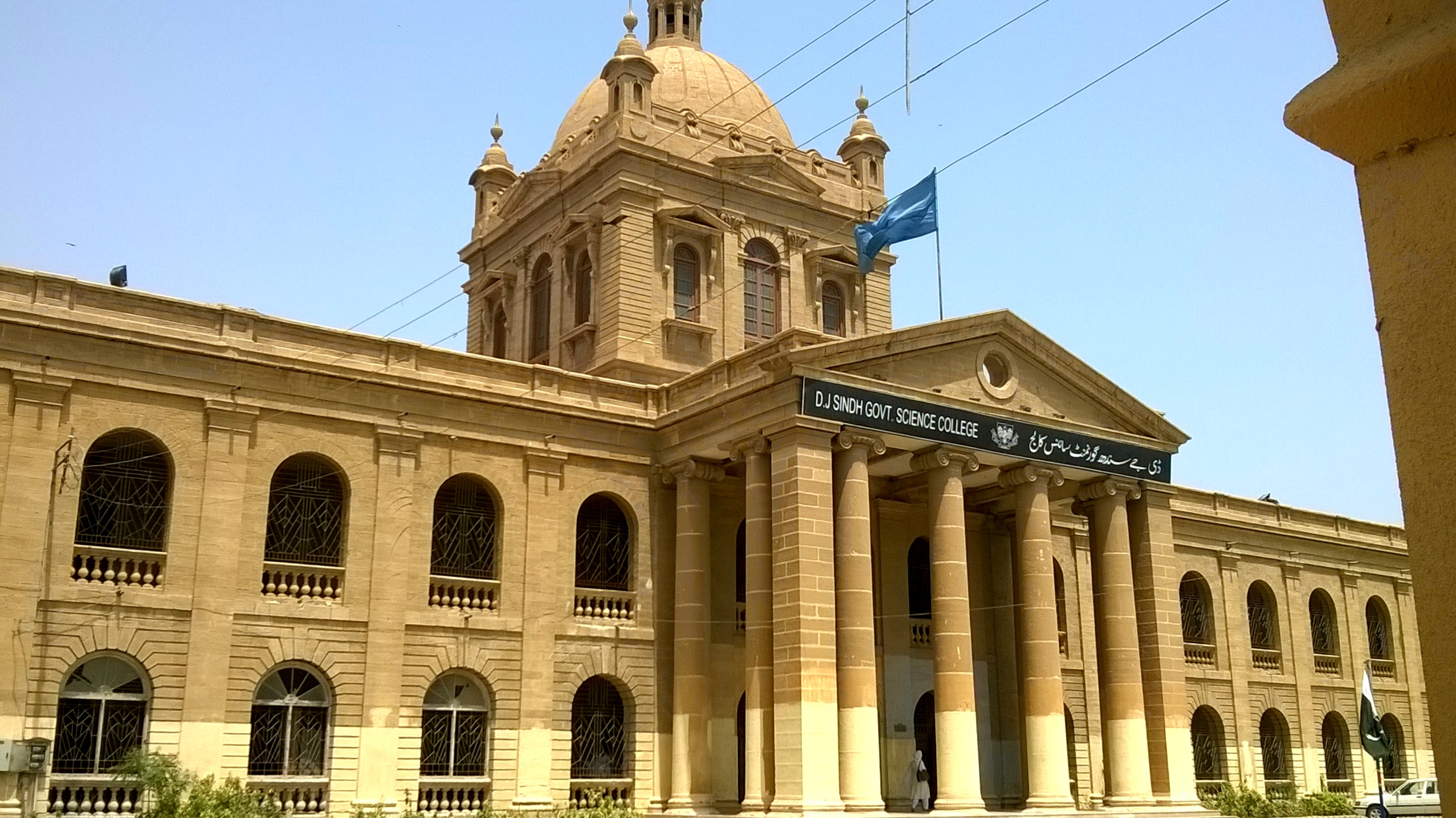
D. J. Science College

The college has the following premises:

- The Main Building is divided into two main parts. One new portion houses the offices of the principal, superintendent as well as the college administration. In this portion are the departments of Urdu and Statistics on the ground floor and the departments of Islamic Studies and Pakistan Studies on the first floor. The oldest portion of the main building has the departments of Biochemistry, Botany, English & Physics in the ground floor, department of Chemistry, Computer Science & Microbiology and some classrooms in the first floor and department of Zoology in the second floor.
- A. Q. Block has only classrooms; they are specially for first year.

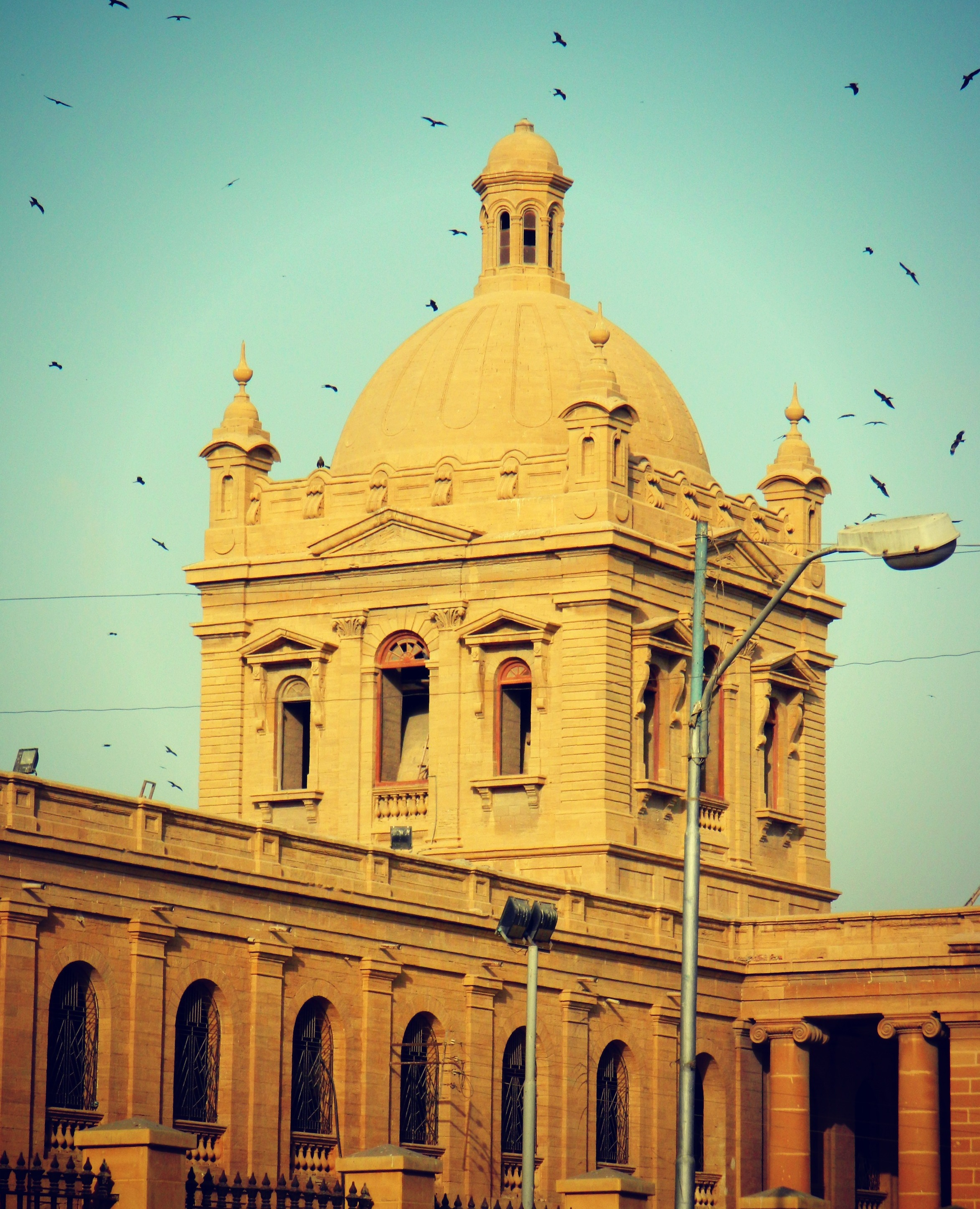
Geology & Math Departments (originally the principal's bungalow)

- There is another building on Muhammad bin Qasim Road, behind the main oldest building, it has the Main Library and departments of Mathematics and Geology.

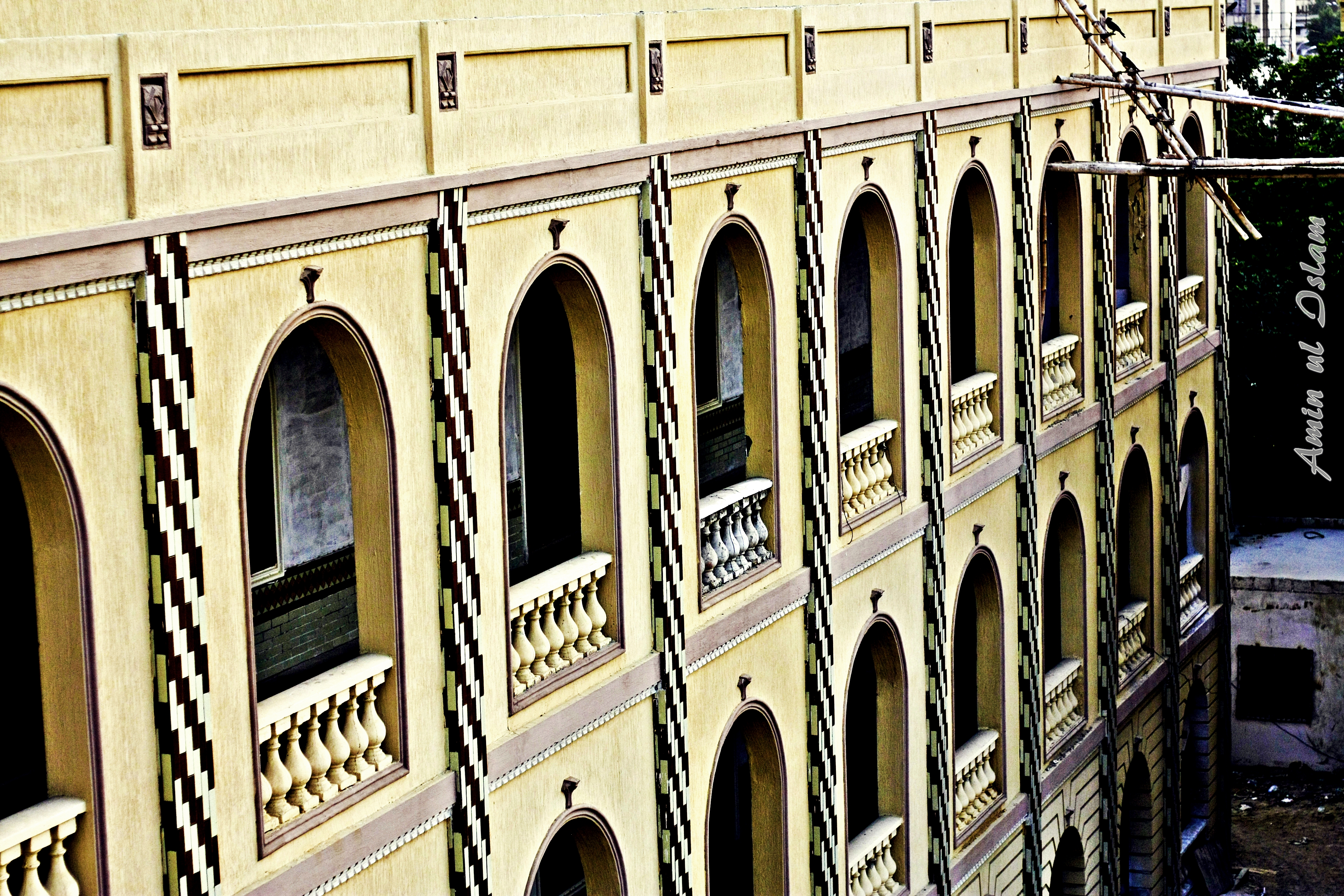
The underconstruction block of college

- M.Sc. block is under construction. It is opposite the A. Q. Block.
- State-of-the-art gymnasium is adjacent to the A. Q. Block.

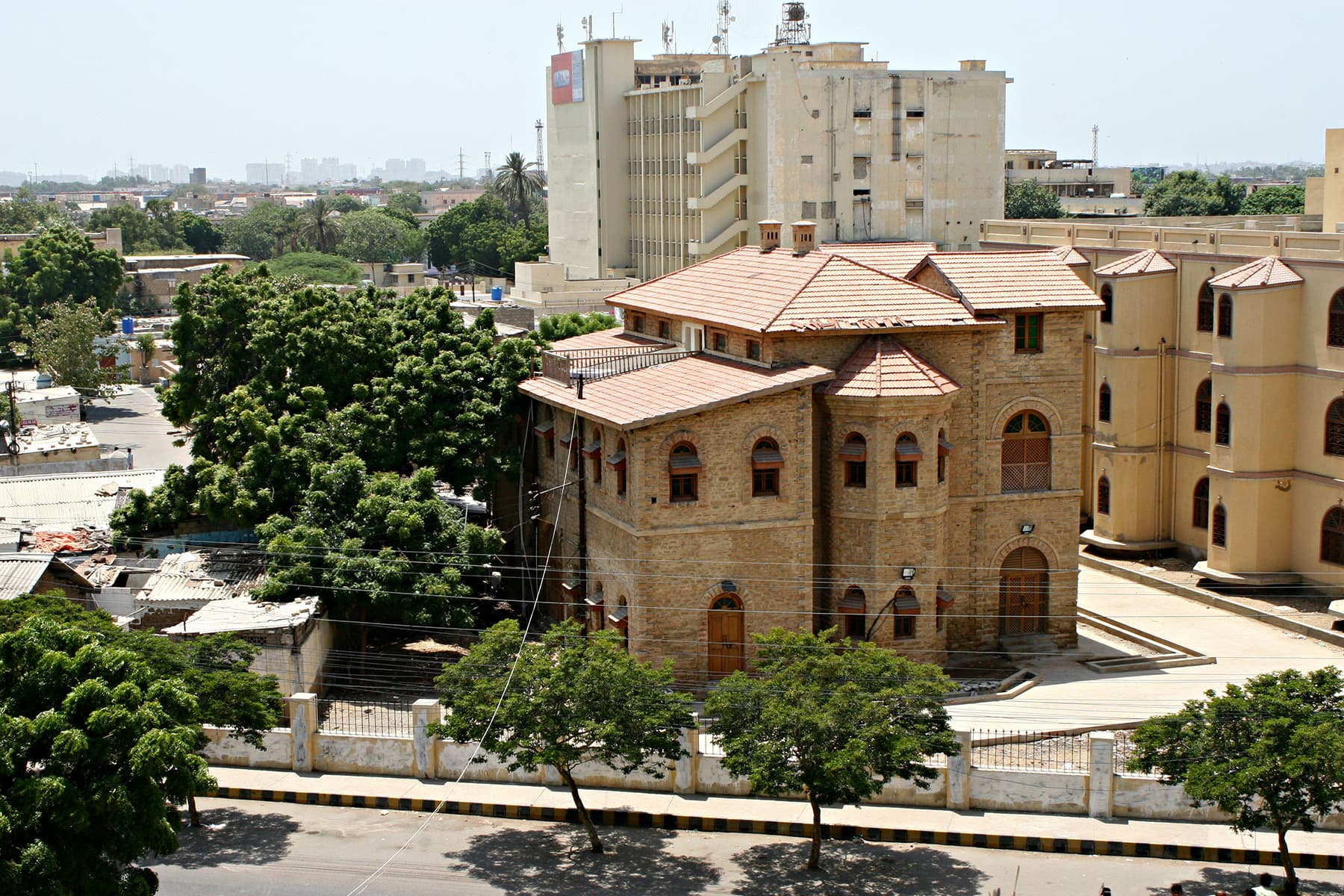
The old Principal Bungalow of DJ Science College, Karachi

- The principal's bungalow is one of the oldest building. Nowadays, Sindh Textbook Board has occupied this building as camp office.
- Sport Complex is near the P.I.D.C roundabout and opposite the Pearl Continent Hotel. This complex is used for cricket and football.

building as on 6 October 2026

== Faculties / Departments ==
The college has the following departments:

- Biochemistry
- Botany
- Chemistry
- English
- Geology
- Islamic Studies
- Computer Science
- Mathematics
- Microbiology
- Pakistan Studies
- Physical Education and Sports
- Physics
- Sindhi
- Statistics
- Urdu
- Zoology

== Admission ==
The college offers the admission in Pre-Engineering and Pre-Medical for Intermediate level affiliated to the Board of Intermediate Education, Karachi (B.I.E.K) under CAP (Centralized Admission Policy).

== Affiliation ==
For undergraduate level, the college offers a combination of any three of the following subjects (Mathematics, Physics, Chemistry, Geology, Statistics, Microbiology, Biochemistry, Botany & Zoology). The college also offers admission in three year Bachelor of Computer Science (B.C.S. Semester System) programme, affiliated to University of Karachi since 1951.

== Principals ==
=== Pre-Independence ===
- Mullineux R. Walmsley (1887–1888)
- Moses John Jackson (1888–1907)
- H.P Ferrell (1908–1916)
- A.C. Miller (1917–1918)
- T.M. Shahani (1918–1927)
- N.B Butani (1927–1943)
- H.M Gurbaxani (1943–1944)
- J.V Lakhani (1944–1947)
- Mariwalla, Dharamdas Tekchand (1947)

=== Post Independence ===
- LA deSouza (1955–1961)
- JB Sidhwa (1961–1967)
- Iftekhar Ahmed Ansari (1967–1972)
- S. H. Zubairi (1972–1984)
- Obaidur Rehman (1984–1985)
- Abdul Samad (1985–1986)
- Naseem Sheikh (1986 Apr–Jun)
- Ziauddin Ahmed (1986 Jul–Sep)
- Anwarul Haq Hashmi (1986–1987)
- Zaheer Ahmed (1987–1988)
- Naseem Ahmed Sheikh (1988–1990)
- Sabzwari (1990)
- M Qasim Siddiqui (1990–1991)
- Abul Wakeel Qureshi (1991)
- Aamir Ismail (1990-1991)
- M Qasim Siddiqui (1991–1993)
- Syed Kamal Uddin (1993–1995)
- Mazharul Haq (1995–1996)
- Muhammad Sharif Memon (1996 - 1997)
- Ravi Shankar Harani (1997)
- Asif (1997–1999)
- Ravi Shankar Harani (1999 - 2006)
- Hakeemullah Baig Chughtai (2006 to 2009)
- Syed Rizwan Haider Taqvi (2009)
- Kamil Shere (1 March 2010 to 5 March 2012)
- Syed Afzal Hussain (5 March 2012 - 12 June 2013)
- Muhammad Arshad (Acting) (13 June 2013 to 16 July 2013)
- Ghulam Mehdi Balouch (17 July 2013 - 31 March 2014)
- Muhammad Arshad (Acting) (1 April 2014 to 12 August 2014)
- Allah Bux Awan (13 August 2014 to 17 October 2014)
- Muhammad Arshad (18 Oct 2014 to 20 Dec 2016)
- Shehzad Muslim Khan (acting) (21 December 2016 to 20 September 2017)
- Muhammad Saleem (21 September 2017 to 30 March 2019)
- Shehzad Muslim Khan (acting) (31 March 2019 to May 2020)
- Ghulam Mustafa Charan (May 2020 – April 2021)
- Muhammad Mehar Mangi (April 2021 - December 2022)
- Rashid Ahmed Meher (December 2022 - 6 September 2023)
- Wajeet Kumar (acting) (6 September 2023 - November 2023)
- Mustafa Kamal Pathan (November 2023 - January 2024)
- Muhammad Suleman Siyal (January 2024 – November 2024)
- Arjan Das (November 2024 - Present)

== Notable alumni ==
- Abdul Qadeer Khan (Nuclear Scientist & Head Of Pakistan Nuclear Weapons Program)
- Ziaur Rahman (former President of Bangladesh)
- Ashraf Habibullah (president and CEO of Computers and Structures, Inc.)
- Pirzada Qasim (ex-vice chancellor Karachi University, vice chancellor Ziauddin University)
- Adeebul Hasan Rizvi - founder of Sindh Institute of Urology & Transplantation (SIUT)
- Shahid Masood (journalist and TV anchor person)
- Kamran Ashraf (national hockey player)
- Shahid Ali Khan (national hockey player)
- Sohail Rana (film and TV music composer)
- Syed Murad Ali Shah (Chief Minister of Sindh)
- Ghulam Hussain Hidayatullah (ex-Chief Minister of Sindh)
- K. M. Kundnani (Principal, D.G. National College, 1947 and founder, R.D. National College, Mumbai)
- Dolarrai Mankad (a well-known Sanskrit scholar and First vice-chancellor of Saurashtra University)
- Moiz Ullah Baig (International Scrabble player - Pakistan Scrabble Champion 2018 & World Junior Scrabble Champion 2018)
- Jamshed Nusserwanjee Mehta (1st Mayor of Karachi)
