= H. R. College of Commerce and Economics =

Autonomous educational institute in Churchgate, Mumbai, India

Hassaram Rijhumal College of Commerce & Economics
- Other name: H. R. College
- Motto: Prosperity Through Commerce
- Type: Public
- Established: 1960
- Affiliations: HSNC University
- Principal: Pooja Ramchandani
- Students: 6000+
- Location: 123, Dinshaw Wachha Road, Churchgate, Mumbai, Maharashtra, 400020, India
- Language: English
- Website: www.hrcollege.edu
- Location within Mumbai Location within Maharashtra Location within India

Hassaram Rijhumal College of Commerce and Economics, commonly known as HR College, is an autonomous (since 2007) educational institute located in Churchgate, Mumbai. It is run by the Hyderabad (Sindh) National Collegiate Board and is affiliated with the HSNC University.

It was the second college in Maharashtra (after KC College, Churchgate) to be accredited 'A' grade with a score of 87.95% by the NAAC (National Assessment & Accreditation Council) under the revised scheme in 2002.

It is located adjacent to Kishinchand Chellaram College, and shares a building with the KC Law College.

== College Leadership ==
Indu Shahani, a noted academic and former Sheriff of Mumbai, is a former principal of HR College.

Currently, Pooja Ramchandani is the principal in charge of the college.

== Courses ==
The courses offered by the institute can be broadly classified into two categories; Junior college degrees & Senior college degrees.

Junior college degrees include 11th grade (FYJC) & 12th grade (SYJC) courses. For this, it is affiliated with Maharashtra State Education Board. This includes the High School passing certificate (Class 12 certificate).

Senior college degrees offered by the institute include courses such as B.COM, BMS, BAF, BBI, BFM, BAMMC, and BVoc(Retail Management), BVoc(Wealth Management) and BVoc(Tourism and Hospitality Management). For this, it is affiliated to the HSNC University.

== HSNC University ==
In 2019, it was announced that HR College will be part of the second cluster university in Mumbai called HSNC Cluster University. This cluster university would also include (and be led by) KC College. They were officially supposed to become part of the cluster university from academic year 2020-21.

== Notable alumni ==
- Manmeet Pritam Singh Arora, Judge at the High Court of Delhi
- Sooraj Barjatya, film director
- Arjun Bijlani, Indian actor
- Neil Bhatt, Indian Actor
- Shantanu Maheshwari
- Rajeev Masand, Indian Film Critic
- Kumar Mangalam Birla, Business Leader (Chairman, Aditya Birla Group)
- Kishore Biyani, businessman
- Aarti Chabria, actress
- Varun Dhawan, actor
- Tannaz Irani, actress
- Karan Johar, Noted film director
- Kunal Jaisingh, actor
- Ranbir Kapoor, actor
- Punit Malhotra, filmmaker
- Neil Nitin Mukesh, Noted actor
- Mishal Raheja, actor & entrepreneur
- Darsheel Safary, actor
- Rishabh Sanjay Shah, entrepreneur & educator
- Suniel Shetty, Notable actor
- Aftab Shivdasani, actor
- Ranveer Singh, actor
- Amyra Dastur, actress
- Sunil Lulla, CEO of BARC India & Former Group CEO of Balaji Telefilms
- Ashish Pherwani, M&E Leader, Ernst & Young India
- Parag Ajagaonkar, Principal of Narsee Monjee College
- Tarun Katial, CEO of Zee5 & Founder of Big FM
- Vikram Limaye, MD & CEO of the National Stock Exchange
- Navjot Singh Sidhu, politician & former cricketer
- Avani Davda, MD of Godrej Nature's Basket
- Sajid Nadiadwala, Film producer
- Namit Malhotra, CEO of DNEG
- Devita Saraf, Founder & CEO of VU Technologies
- Patralekha, model and actress
- Sobhita Dhulipala, model and actress
- Farhan Akhtar, Film director, actor, singer, writer & producer
- Anant Bajaj, Ex-MD of Bajaj Electricals
- Piyush Goyal, Politician & Union Cabinet Minister (Railways, Commerce, etc.)
- Gautam Singhania, Business Leader (Chairman & MD, Raymonds Textiles)
- Deena Mehta, Ex-President, Bombay Stock Exchange

== See also ==
- Kishinchand Chellaram College
- Narsee Monjee College of Commerce and Economics
- Mithibai College
- St. Xavier's College, Mumbai
- Sydenham College of Commerce and Economics
- Jai Hind College
