= Hotchand Gopaldas Advani =

Indian lawyer and educationist

- Born: 22 April 1907; Hyderabad, Sindh, India
- Died: 9 May 1991 (aged 84)
- Education: King's College London
- Occupations: Lawyer; educationist; businessman
- Works: Founded 20 colleges and 8 Institutions
- Title: President of Hyderabad (Sind) National Collegiate Board, Chairman of the Sindhu Resettlement Corporation, Gandhidham
- Spouse: Savitri Hotchand Advani
- Children: 3

Hotchand Gopaldas Advani (22 April 1907 - 9 May 1991) was an Indian lawyer, educationist, social reformist and a businessman. He was one of the founders of K.C. College, K.C. Law College and Jai Hind Cooperative Bank of India. He served as founding president of Hyderabad (Sindh) National Collegiate Board, and chairman of the Sindhu Resettlement Corporation Gandhidham, India.

== Early life and career ==
Hotchand Advani was born on 22 April 1907 in Hyderabad, Sindh, British India (now Pakistan). His father Gopaldas Jhatmal Advani was a notable lawyer of Sindh. He got early education in Hyderabad and graduated from King's College London.

He served as a Municipal Councillor of Hyderabad and the President, Hyderabad Bar Association. He was the legal advisor of Hyderabad Municipality, Hyderabad District Local Board, and many other institutions of name and fame. He was also director and member of many banks, institutions, clubs and societies of Sindh.

During the partition of British India in 1947, he moved to Pune India and continued his career as a Barrister. Like his father, he proved himself as one of the leading reputable lawyers of India.

== Contributions ==
Advani was not only a leading lawyer of his time but a great educationalist as well. For the promotion of education, he and his father founded a trust called Hyderabad (Sindh) National Collegiate Board in 1921. After partition of India, he moved the trust to India in 1949 which was recognised by the Maharashtra State Government as linguistic (Sindhi) minority educational institution. He served as the founding president of this trust in India. On the platform of this trust, Hotachand Advani and Principal K.M. Kundnani opened R.D. National College Bandra Mumbai in 1949. They opened second college - the Kishinchand Chellaram College (K.C. College) in 1954. Slowly but steadily, they founded a chain of twenty colleges and eight institutions – opening doors for so many young people to jobs, to education and training in various fields.

Advani worked with many social and educational trusts and foundations. He served as a Vice-Chairman of the Watumal Foundation. This trust established the Watumal Senatorium in Mumbai for the treatment of tuberculosis patients. He also served as Chairman of the Saint Miran College Education Board (Pune), president of Jai Hind College Board, Chairman of the Sindhu Resettlement Corporation Gandhidham, and chairman of the Board of Daily Hindustan. He launched Sindhi language newspaper Hindustan and weekly Sindhi magazine Hindvasi.

== Personal ==
Hotchand Advani was married to Savitri Hotchand Advani (5 April 1914 - 25 July 2016). He had three sons Rajkumar Hotchand Advani, Ashok Hotchand Advani and Hiroo Hotchand Advani.

== Death ==
Hotchand Gopaldas Advani died on 9 May 1991.
