= Avani =

Avani may refer to:

- Armoured Vehicles Nigam, an Indian public sector defence company
- Avani (given name), a popular Indian origin name
- Avani (month), the fifth month of the Tamil calendar
- Avani, Kolar, a place in Karnataka
- Avani Avittam, a Hindu festival
- Avani Hotels & Resorts, a Thai hotel chain
- Avani Riverside Mall, a shopping mall in Kolkata
