= Ulhasnagar =

City in Maharashtra, India

- City; Mumbai Metropolitan City
- Location within Maharashtra
- Coordinates: 19.22°N 73.15°E
- Country: India
- State: Maharashtra
- District: Thane

Government
  - Type: Municipal Corporation
  - Body: Ulhasnagar Municipal Corporation

Area
  - Total: 28 km^{2} (11 sq mi)
- Elevation: 19 m (62 ft)

Population (2011)
  - Total: 506,098
  - Density: 18,000/km^{2} (47,000/sq mi)

Language
  - Official: Marathi
  - Others: Sindhi
- Time zone: UTC+5:30 (IST)
- PIN: 421 001; 421 002; 421 003; 421 004; 421 005
- Telephone code: STD code 0251
- Vehicle registration: MH-05
- Lok Sabha constituency: Kalyan
- Website: www.umc.gov.in

Ulhasnagar is a city located 26 km from Thane City in Thane district, Maharashtra, India. This city is a part of the Mumbai Metropolitan Region managed by the MMRDA. It had an estimated population of 506,098 at the 2011 Census. Ulhasnagar is a municipal city and the headquarters of the Tahsil bearing the same name. It has a suburban station on the Central line of the Mumbai Suburban Railway. Kumar Ailani is the current member of the Legislative Assembly (MLA) representing the Ulhasnagar constituency.

== History ==
A suburban railway station was built in 1955. In January 1960, Ulhasnagar Municipality was formed, with Arjun K. Ballani as the first chief, and a municipal council was nominated. In 1965, elections were held for the first time in this council. In the late 1970s, Ulhasnagar was a town settled mainly by Sindhi Hindu refugees from Sindh Pakistan. Now this 28 square kilometre area has 389,000 people of Sindhi descent, the largest enclave of Sindhis in India. The town lies outside Mumbai city but within the Mumbai Conurbation. In 2010, the estimated population of Sindhi Hindus in Ulhasnagar was 400,000.

There are some criminal gangs in town working under the patronage of political parties. Also, for many illegal building projects in the 1990s, politicians started to charge money to look the other way.

== Demographics ==
Historical population
Year	Pop.	±%
1951	80,861	—
1961	107,760	+33.3%
1971	168,462	+56.3%
1981	273,668	+62.5%
1991	369,077	+34.9%
2001	473,731	+28.4%
2011	506,098	+6.8%
Source: Government of India

Religion in Ulhasnagar (2011)
Religion	Percent
Hinduism	82.48%
Buddhism	7.75%
Islam	6.33%
Sikhism	1.73%
Christianity	1.21%
Others	0.49%

According to the 2011 Census of India, Ulhasnagar had a population of 506,098. Ulhasnagar is the 22nd-largest city in Maharashtra and the 88th-largest city in the country. Males constituted 53% of the population and females 47%. There are about four lakh Sindhi-speaking Hindus in Ulhasnagar. Sindhis migrated to Ulhasnagar after the partition of India. Each year, the Sindhi community in Ulhasnagar observes Cheti Chand with fasting and prayers dedicated to Lord Jhulelal at temples throughout the city.

Languages in Ulhasnagar (2011)
1. Marathi (32.3%)
2. Sindhi (32.0%)
3. Hindi (20.6%)
4. Bhojpuri (2.96%)
5. Urdu (1.71%)
6. Gujarati (1.54%)
7. Punjabi (1.54%)
8. Bengali (1.23%)
9. Others (6.16%)

== Economy ==
The town covers an area of 13 square kilometres and is divided into 285 blocks. It is a centre for the production of rayon silk, dyes, ready-made garments, electrical/electronic appliances and confectionery. The total length of roads and streets in the town is 352 kilometres. The town is served by underground and open-surface drainage, with night soil being disposed of by septic tank latrines. The town has a protected water supply through MIDC. The Sanctioned Water Quota at various tapping points is 112 MLD. Fire-fighting services are also available in the town. There are sixty private hospitals with a total bed-strength of 840 beds, three government hospitals with a total bed-strength of 356 beds, 255 dispensaries/clinics, 100 RMPs and a family planning centre.

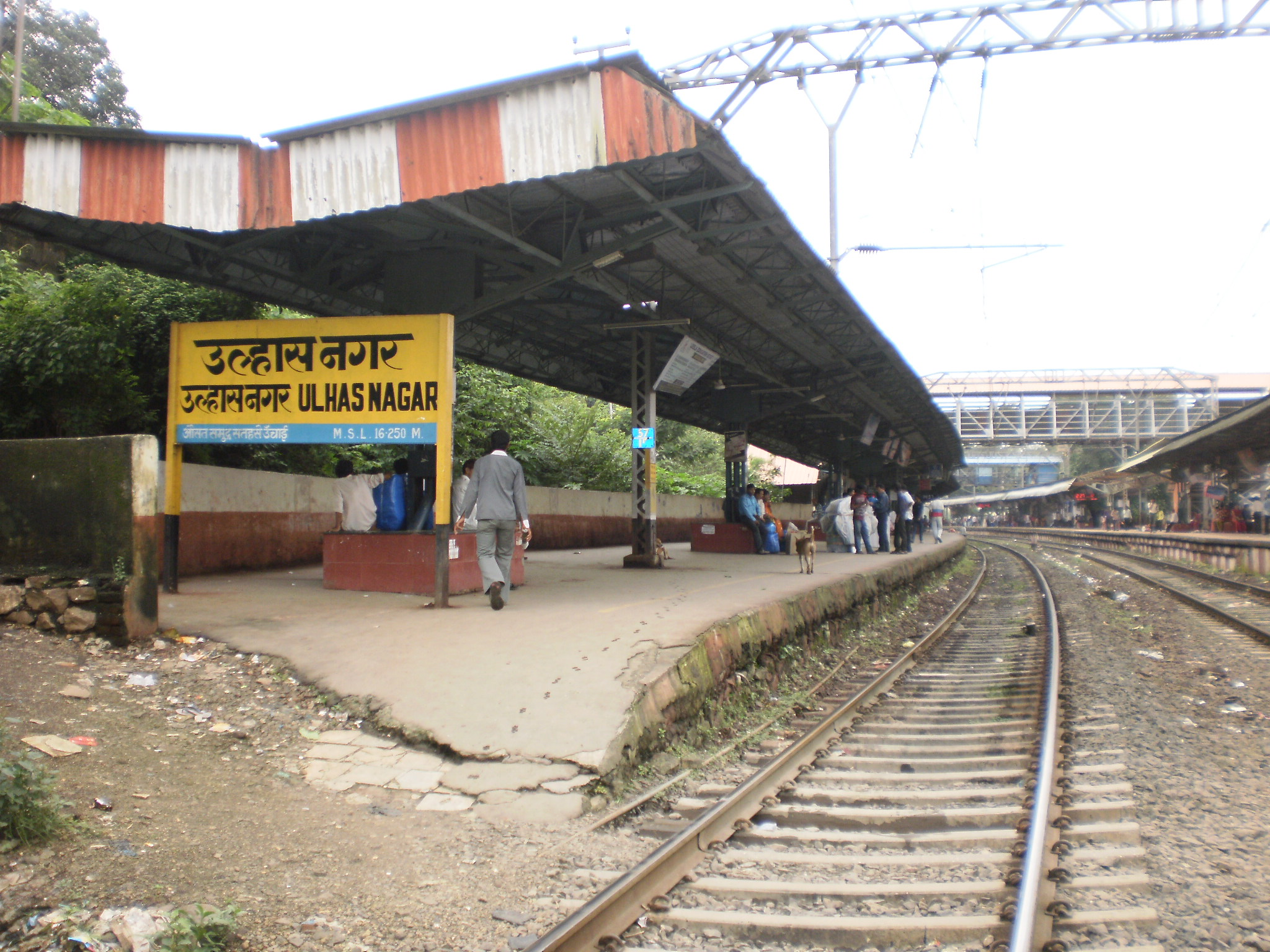
Ulhasnagar railway station

Ulhasnagar has some small businesses manufacturing denim. Some of the manufacturers export jeans worldwide from Ulhasnagar. The city is also known for its furniture, cloth and electronics markets.

== Municipal finance ==
According to financial data published on the CityFinance Portal of the Ministry of Housing and Urban Affairs, the Ulhasnagar Municipal Corporation reported total revenue receipts of ₹418 crore (US$50 million) and total expenditure of ₹423 crore (US$51 million) in 2022–23. Tax revenue accounted for about 6.2% of the total revenue, while the corporation received ₹295 crore in grants during the financial year.

== Clean air ==
Ulhasnagar has been ranked 13th best “National Clean Air City” under (Category 2 3-10L Population cities) in India according to 'Swachh Vayu Survekshan 2024 Results'.

== Education ==
Educational facilities are provided by 129 primary schools, 56 secondary schools, 9 higher secondary schools, 3 colleges and 2 technical colleges.

Smt. Chandibai Himmatmal Mansukhani College (C. H. M. College), established in 1965, has five college buildings:

- Principal K M Kundnani Pharmacy Polytechnique
- Institute of Technology
- Dr L. H. Hiranandani College of Pharmacy
- H and G H Mansukhani Institute of Management
- Nari Gursahani Law College
- Ulhasnagar Girls College, started in 1961, was later converted to R K Talreja College.
