= HSNC University =

Public University in India

HSNC University, Mumbai
- Type: Public University
- Established: 11 June 2020; 6 years ago
- Affiliations: H(S)NC Board; Government of Maharashtra
- Chancellor: Governor of Maharashtra
- Vice-Chancellor: Col. (Dr.) Hemlata K. Bagla
- Location: D.M. Harish Building, 47, Dr. R. G. Thadani Marg, Worli, Mumbai, Maharashtra, 400018, India
- Campus: Urban
- Website: hsncu.edu.in

The HSNC University, Mumbai is a collegiate public state university located in Mumbai, Maharashtra. It was established as a joint venture between the Ministry of HRD (erstwhile Education Ministry), the Government of Maharashtra, and the HSNC Board (the parent educational trust). It is the second cluster university in the city of Mumbai.

== Overview ==
The HSNC University is a Cluster university comprising a cluster of the existing colleges from the Bombay vicinity; namely, H.R. College (as the lead college), Kishinchand Chellaram College (KC College), and Bombay Teachers' Training College (BTTI) as the constituent colleges with H(S)NC Board as its parent body. It is established under the Rashtriya Uchchatar Shikshan Abhiyan (RUSA) scheme, a funding agency under the purview of the Ministry of Human Resource Development, Government of India.

The University aims to promote skill development and will include courses such as dance, music, and yoga, for which the students will get course credits with an option to avail e-certificate. A dedicated ‘Incubation Centre’ to help students' liaison with associations, and self-learning modules in the curriculum to help students to score marks, are some concepts being offered.

== Constituent institutions ==
- K.C. College (Founding College)
- H.R. College (Founding College)
- Bombay Teachers Training College (Founding College)
- Niranjan Hiranandani School of Real Estate
- D.M. Harish School of Law
- School of Interdisciplinary Studies
- School of Yoga
- School of Applied Sciences
- School of Performing Arts
- K M Kundnani College of Pharmacy
- R. D. National College

== Formation Acts ==
The HSNC University, Mumbai, is constituted under sub-section (6) of section 3 of the Maharashtra Public Universities Act, 2016 (Mah. VI of 2017), the Government of Maharashtra vide notification no. Rusayo-2019/CR-186/UE-3 dated 30 October 2019 in the official gazette as a Cluster University.

== Initiation ==
As of 2020, HSNC University has come into existence. It is a cluster university consisting of three prestigious colleges of the board; namely, KC College, HR College & Bombay Teacher's training Institute (BTTI). The University was officially launched on 11 June by Mr. Bhagat Singh Koshyari, the then-Governor of Maharashtra, in presence of Mr. Uddhav Thackeray, the Chief Minister of Maharashtra.

HSNC University is the second cluster university in the city, after Dr. Homi Bhabha State University, which brought together Sydhenham College, Elphinstone College, Secondary Training College and The Institute of Science. The latter, though, was a cluster formed with government colleges alone.

== Partnerships and collaborations ==
On 25 June 2020, HSNC University joined hands with Pennsylvania State System of Higher Education, USA (PSSHE) by signing the Letter of Intent (LOI) for ‘Higher Education Academic Partnership’. The formal signing ceremony took place virtually on 23 June 2020.

The LOI was signed by Dr. Niranjan Hiranandani, Provost of HSNC University Mumbai and Dr Peter H. Garland, Executive Vice Chancellor Emeritus for Commonwealth of Pennsylvania State System of Higher Education.

A LOI was signed between the cluster university and Deakin University.

On 16 March 2021, the cluster university hosted organized its first General Council Meeting at Raj Bhavan, Mumbai. The Governor of Maharashtra (and Chancellor of the universities) along with the Provost of HSNC University, Dr. Niranjan Hiranandani presided over the first General Council Meeting of the newly constituted HSNC Cluster University on Monday along with other University dignitaries. In this GC Meeting, Dr. Hiranandani stated;

"Additionally, in an effort to provide an at par global education, we are also working towards a collaborative effort in presenting a comprehensive distance learning curriculum in association with the prestigious Harvard University." ~ Dr. Niranjan Hiranandani, Provost - HSNC University

The University has also joined hands with TCS iON to design an industry certification that is in-line with the need of the hour.

"The HSNC University, Mumbai has collaborated with India’s biggest global IT player ‘TCS iON’ for an industry Honour Certification. The alliance is designed to train and skill the young talent pool to become ‘Industry Ready’... By joining hands with TCS iON, HSNC University will facilitate learners with certificate courses, programmes, internships, and placement assistance." ~ The Tribune

In addition to the recent collaborations with the university, the founding colleges already enjoy a wide range of national and international linkages in a variety of fields. These are with institutions such as Duke University (Fuqua School of Business), Boston University, Bentley University, Swiss School of Tourism and Hospotality, Jonkoping University, Child Rights & You (CRY India), and many more.
