= Sanjay Hegde =

Senior advocate at the Supreme Court of India

Sanjay R Hegde
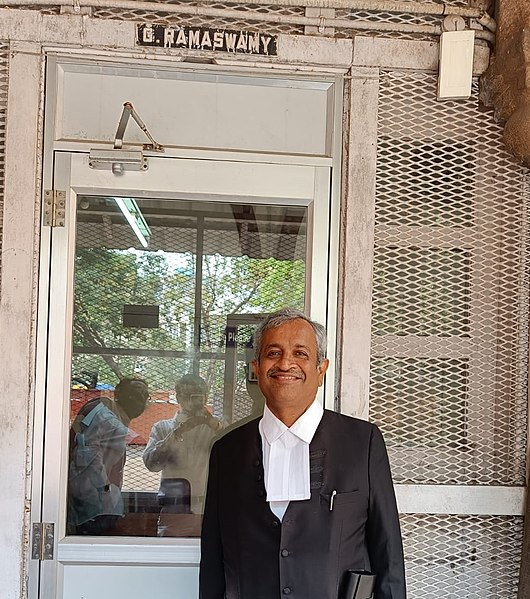
- Sanjay R Hegde is a senior advocate at Supreme Court of India

Sanjay R Hegde (born 19 July 1965) is a senior advocate at the Supreme Court of India. He is a leading voice for civil rights He was one of the two amicus curiae appointed by the Supreme Court of India to assist the court in the 2012 Delhi gang rape and murder. He was appointed as an interlocutor by the Supreme Court of India to talk to the protestors at Shaheen Bagh protest.

== Early life and education ==
Sanjay R Hegde was born in Manipal. His father was a lawyer practicing at the Bombay High Court. After completing his class I in Manipal he moved to Mumbai where he studied till class X. After class X, he spent five years in Manipal and completed his B.Com, before moving to Mumbai to study law at KC Law College.

He got selected in the UPSC Civil Service Aptitude Test for allied Indian Administrative Services. He had been a debater and a quizzer during his college days.

== Legal career ==
He started his career as a lawyer in 1989, working at M/s Mulla & Mulla & Craigie Blunt & Caroe Solicitors. He moved to Delhi to work in the chamber of Senior Advocate G. Ramaswamy, a former Attorney-General for India.

He has represented several people who were declared foreigners in the NRC case

He writes frequently in major Indian newspapers and magazines and appears as a legal expert on news channels.

== Case Against Twitter ==
On 27 October 2019, Hegde's Twitter account was suspended for posting an anti-authoritarian image. He filed a petition in the Delhi High Court against the suspension of his account by Twitter. In its filing before the HC, Government of India has contended that suspension of Hegde's account by Twitter violates law on free speech. Earlier, Government had said that it has nothing to do with Sanjay Hegde's account suspension.
In Jan 2023, his Twitter suspension was revoked and his account was restored. He continues to use the same image on his profile, which led to the suspension.
