= Kishinchand Chellaram College =

Junior and degree college in Mumbai, India

- Kiśinacaṁda Cēllārāma Kôlēja

Location
- 124, Dinshaw Wachha Road; Churchgate; Mumbai - 400020, Maharashtra; India; 18°55′47″N 72°49′38″E

Information
- Other name: KC College
- Type: Junior and Degree College
- Motto: Vidyayā vindatē amr̥tam! (Salvation through knowledge!)
- Established: 1954; 72 years ago
- Founder: K.M. Kundnani
- Trust: HSNC Board
- Principal: Tejashree V. Shanbhag
- Faculty: 200+
- Grades: "A" by NAAC with CGPA of 3.43 out of 4
- Campus: Urban
- Mascot: "Kiran" The Phoenix
- Publication: The Kiran
- Affiliations: HSNC University
- Website: www.kccollege.edu.in

Kishinchand Chellaram College (ISO: Kiśinacaṁda Cēllārāma Kôlēja), commonly known as KC College, is an autonomous higher educational institution in Mumbai, Maharashtra, India. It is affiliated with the HSNC University. It was the first college to be awarded an "A" grade by the National Assessment and Accreditation Council (NAAC) in Mumbai (and Maharashtra).

== Location ==
The college campus is located in the locality of Churchgate and can be accessed by the station terminal. Incidentally, the college is much closer to Mantralaya than Churchgate railway station.

The College shares its campus with two other institutes; namely H.R. College and KC Law College, which are also run by the same Educational trust - H(S)NC Board.

== History ==
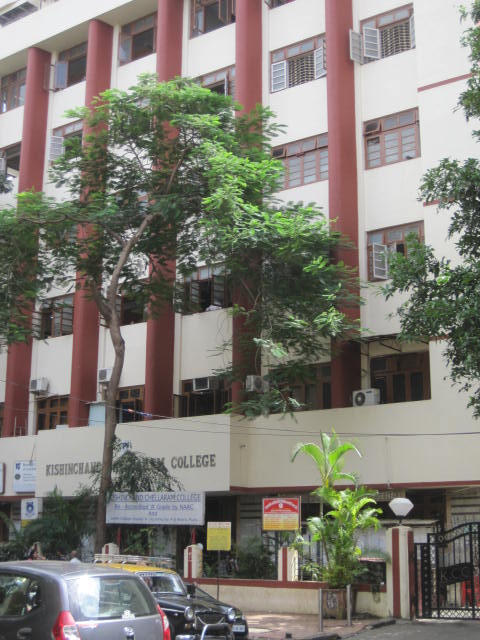
KC College

Kishinchand Chellaram College was established in 1954 under the aegis of the Hyderabad (Sind) National Collegiate Board. It was the second institution that the Management set up in Mumbai after it relocated itself in the city, following the aftermath of the Partition. The onus of the task was taken up by founders, principal K.M. Kundnani and barrister Hotchand Gopaldas Advani, who helped set up K.C. College as well as several other educational institutions. Kundnani and Advani were the pillars of that board.

The R. D. National College was the first of the board's institutions and K.C. College was the second. The latter came to be reckoned as its flagship institution from where the board's activities were conducted. The plot for the construction of K.C. College was leased from Ratanben Fauzdar for 99 years. Under the draught plan of architect K.M Gidwani and the management of principal Kundnani, the building was completed in six months. The foundation stone was laid by Dinkarrao Desai, the Minister Of Education.

Students were admitted from 1 June 1954 but a formal inauguration of the inception of the college was performed by Morarji Desai, the then-Chief Minister of Bombay State (later, Prime Minister of India) on 15 August of the same year. Its first batch comprised 1800 students and, within three years, the numbers have consistently increased.

In 2014, the college celebrated its Diamond Jubilee year with a massive celebration titled "KC@60". The celebration was inaugurated by President Pranab Mukherjee. The event was also attended by Governor K Sankaranarayanan, Maharashtra CM Prithiviraj Chavan, Union Minister of State Milind Deora, Bollywood actor Amitabh Bachchan, and industrialist Anil Ambani, who is also an alum. There were several other celebrities in attendance as well.

As of 2020, HSNC University has come into existence. It is a cluster university consisting of three colleges of the board; namely, KC College, HR College and Bombay Teacher's training Institute (BTTI). The university was officially launched on 11 June by Bhagat Singh Koshyari, Governor of Maharashtra, in presence of Chief minister of Maharashtra Uddhav Thackeray.

=== Principals ===
Hemlata K. Bagla (2016–present)

Manju Nichani (2000 - 2016)

== Courses ==
In addition to science, arts and commerce degrees, the college offers professional and vocational courses such as Bachelor of Mass Media (B.M.M), Bachelor of Arts in films television and new media production, B.Sc computer science, B.Sc. in information technology, Bachelor in accounts and finance, Bachelor in banking and insurance, computer applications, and biotechnology and industrial chemistry.

The college's Department of Mass Media has been consistently ranked in Top 10 Media Schools in the country. The Dept. has a reputation of regularly hosting interactions between students and veterans of the Media & Entertainment industry such as Boman Irani, Cyrus Bharucha, Sudhir Mishra and more. Apart from this, the college is renowned for its annual International Media Conference.

== Campus layout and facilities ==
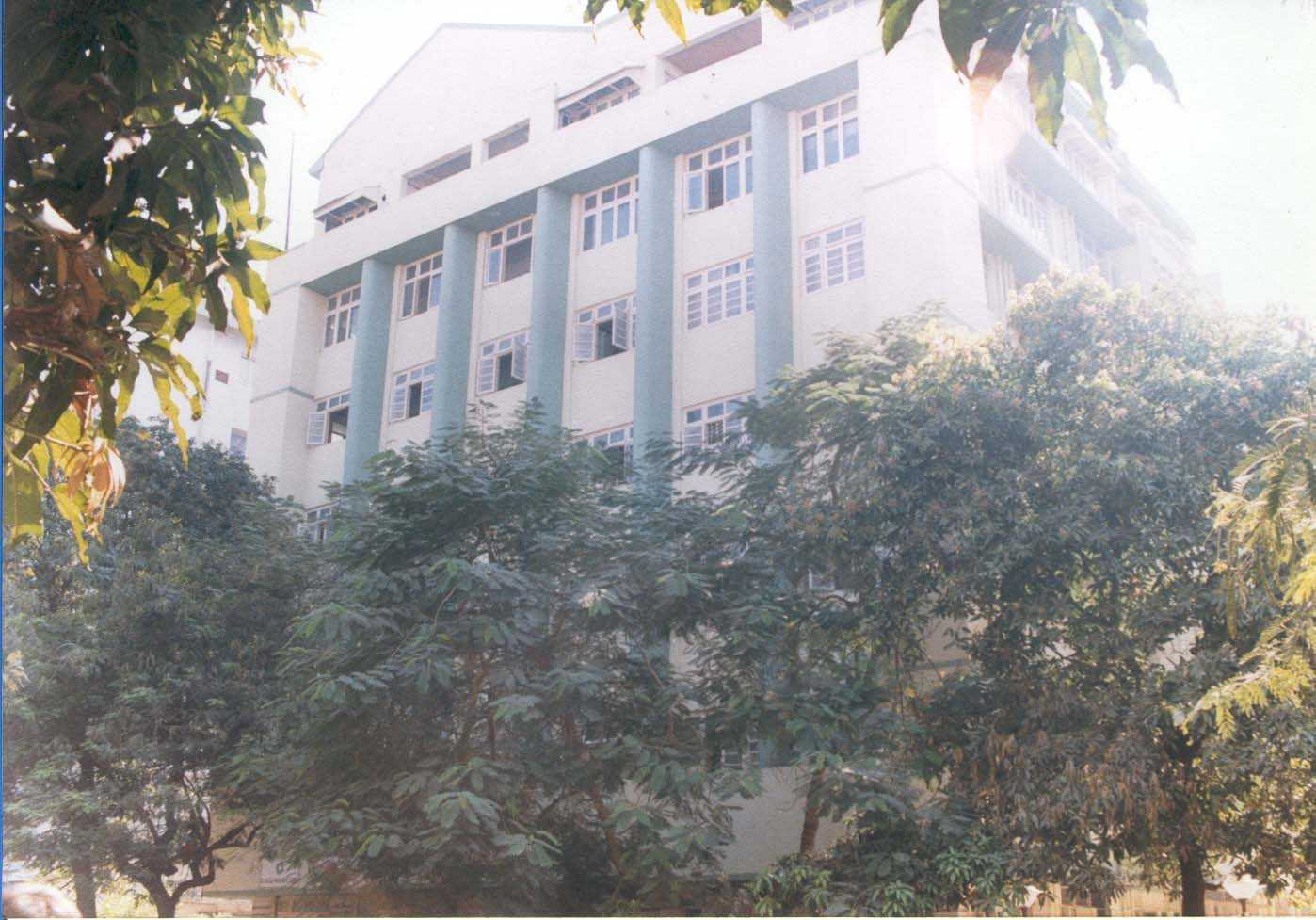
K.C. College campus

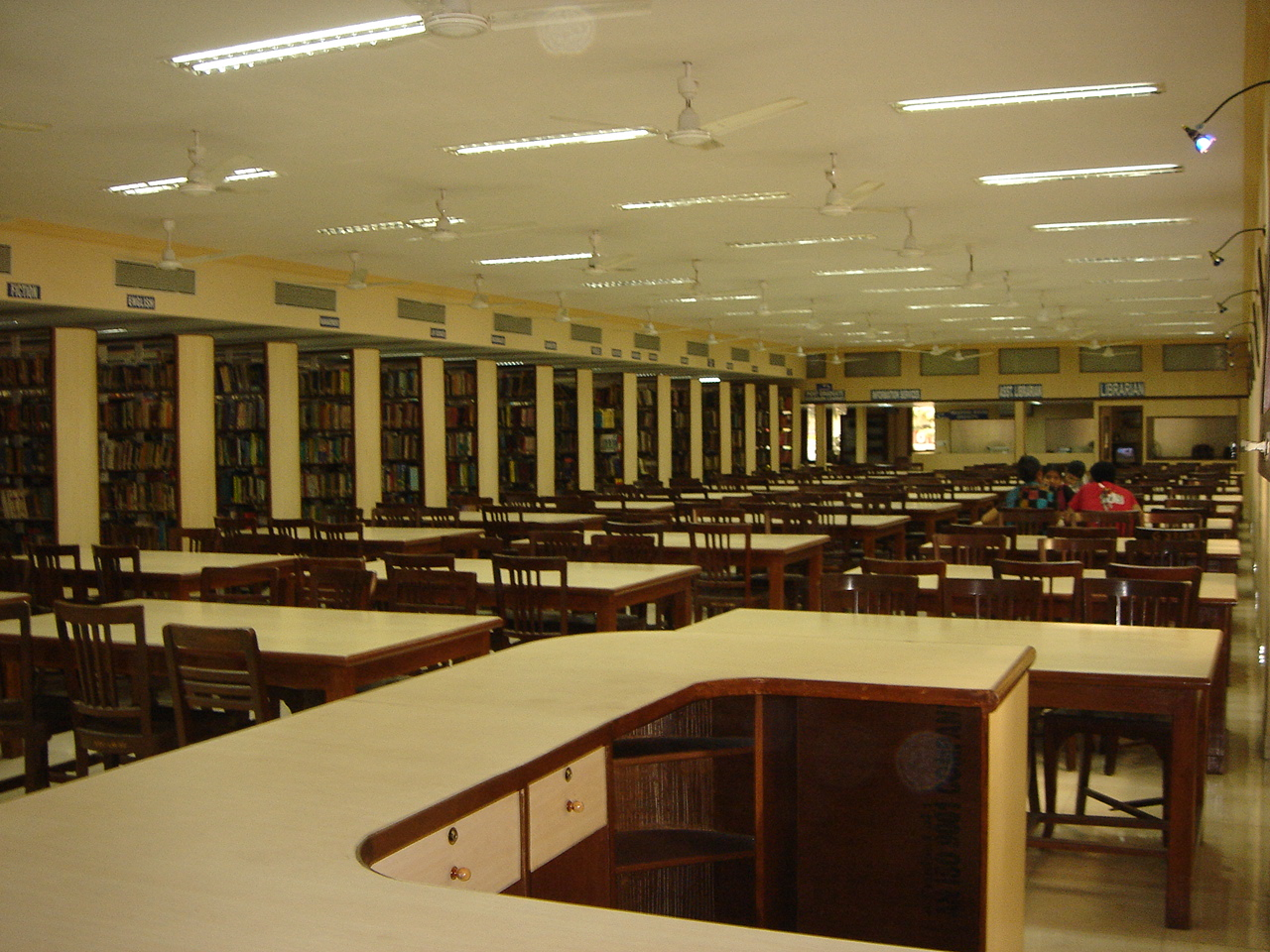
Campus library

The building had an area of 70,000 sq ft (6,500 m^{2}) and was built in the restrained art-deco style that dominated the architectural design ethic in the city since the 1920s. The college today has an air-conditioned auditorium with nearly 600 seating capacity, a parquet indoor badminton court and a community hall. The Department of Mass Media now operates through its new Colaba campus building.

== STAR College Status ==
The college was awarded with Star College scheme by DBT (Department of Biotechnology) Govt. of India, in 2016, where the infrastructure of laboratories were improved and various activities and seminars were organised with the fundings provided by DBT under this scheme, to generate interest in students for pursuing science as well as motivating them for pursuing research in future. On completion of the three years under this "Star College scheme", the college was awarded with the "Star College" status in 2019 with funding provided doubled from the previous funding of "Star college scheme".

The college is funded with FIST program by DST (Department of Science and Technology) Govt. of India, with '0' level grant of 80 lakhs in 2016 for progress in science courses and developing infrastructure of laboratories.

== Principal K.M. Kundnani Memorial Lecture ==
This lecture series is a flagship event of the college where distinguished guests are invited as speakers. They give a lecture about their respective fields or their journey. The lecture ends with a round of Q&A.

Some of the notable speakers who have given the lectures are:

- Suresh Prabhu, Indian parliamentarian & cabinet minister
- Rajat Sharma, television personality and journalist
- Arun Jaitley, Indian parliamentarian & cabinet minister
- Narayan Murthy, founder and chairman of Infosys
- Shashi Tharoor, Indian parliamentarian and former international diplomat
- Kiran Bedi, former Lt. Governor of Punducherry and first female IPS officer
- Swati Piramal, Indian scientist and industrialist
- Jayant Narlikar, Indian astrophysicist
- Prakash Baba Amte, Indian social worker & medical doctor
- Mandakini Amte, Indian doctor & Social worker
- Vijay Bhatkar, Indian computer scientist
- R A Mashalkar, Indian Chemist
- Subir Raha, Chair & MD of ONGC
- Kiran Mazumdar Shaw, Indian Entrepreneur & Chair and MD of Biocon
- Srikumar Bannerjee, Indian metallurgical engineer
- Chanda Kochhar, MD & CEO of ICICI
- Dada JP Vaswani, Indian spiritual leader
- Deepak Parekh, Chair HDFC Home loans
- Ram Jethmalani, Indian lawyer & politician
- Ratan Kumar Sinha, Indian nuclear physicist & Chair of Atomic Commission

== Extra Curriculars ==
KC College's students are called "KCites",

There are a number of clubs and associations that are present in the college. Some of the clubs & associations in KC College are;

S.Co.P.E: The Cultural club of KC College

This club is responsible for all the cultural activities that take part in the college as well as college representation in other College festivals. They are responsible for hosting/organising the college's flagship festival – Kiran – which hosts a massive influx of students from all over.

The Rotaract Club of KC College (RCKC)

This RCKC engages in community service. They host a large number of events whose main objective varies from community service to personal or professional development.

Spectrum

The Spectrum is also a cultural club in KC College which is responsible for enriching the atmosphere. The difference between this & SCoPE is that, this is purely for the Junior College students.

Health Care Committee

This is an important committee of the College which plays a proactive role in promoting health care among students & persons in college & outside. They regularly organise free health check-ups, health camps, workshops & more for promoting a good & healthy lifestyle.

Gender Issue Cell

The college has a Gender Issues Cell that is proactively involved in raising awareness on issues of gender discrimination and in providing a nuanced understanding of gender issues through multifarious activities like workshops, interactive lectures, film screenings, debates, elocutions and group discussions, collaborative ventures with advocacy groups.

== College festivals ==
Kiran, one of the most popular college festivals in the city, is hosted by the students of KC College. It is an inter-collegiate youth festival held usually in August during the rains and involves teams from more than 60 other colleges in Mumbai and elsewhere, with around 30 cultural contests in the Literary, Performing Arts, and Fine Arts categories, along with a number of Workshops on different themes.

Apart from the main Kiran Fest, there are some sub-fests that are also hosted such as 'Kiran Spectrum'; this refers to the part of kiran fest hosted by the Junior College students' association called 'Spectrum'.

Blitzkriegeg is another annual media festival organised by the Mass Media department of the college. It is usually held in November. There are more than 22 Creative Events ranging from topics of advertising, journalism, photography, radio, television, band and sports apart from the Flagship Events which included fashion shows, dance tournaments, drama and mock band.

Then, there are other recognised events such as Joule, Bio-Gene, Bio-Ethica, Parnassus, Tech Renegade & Systematic Chaos.

Festivals held at K. C. College in Churchgate typically feature a range of activities, encouraging participation, enthusiasm and sportsmanship.

== Notable alumni ==
- Kajal Aggarwal, film actress
- Anil Ambani, chairman of the Reliance Group
- Aishwarya Rai, film actress and winner of Miss World
- Viplav Bajoria, an Indian politician from Akola & Member of Maharashtra Legislative Council representing Parbhani-Hingoli Local Authority.
- Shafi Inamdar, TV actor
- Kayoze Irani, film actor
- Jeetendra, film actor
- Prakash Jha, film maker
- Rajesh Khanna, film actor.
- R. Madhavan, film actor
- John Matthew Matthan, film maker
- Zakir Naik, Islamic orator
- Rashesh Shah, chairman, CEO and founder of Edelweiss Group; former president of FICCI.
- Shilpa Shinde, TV actress and winner of Bigg Boss
- Taher Shabbir, TV actor
- Jai Pratap Singh, Indian politician and cabinet minister in the Government of Uttar Pradesh
- Mrunal Thakur, film and TV actress
- Nikita Thukral, Indian film actress

== See also ==
- Hyderabad (Sind) National Collegiate Board
- List of Mumbai Colleges
- HSNC University, Mumbai
