= Dolarrai Mankad =

- Born: 23 January 1902; Cutch, British India
- Died: 29 August 1970 (aged 68)
- Citizenship: Indian
- Occupations: Critic; Researcher; Poet
- Writing career
- Language: Gujarati
- Notable work: Naivedya
- Notable awards: Sahitya Academy Award

Dolarrai Mankad (Hindi: डोलरराय मांकद; Gujarati: ડોલરરાય માંકડ; 23 January 1902 – 29 August 1970), full name Dolarrai Rangildas Mankad, was a Gujarati educator, critic, researcher and poet who won the 1964 Sahitya Akademi Award for Gujarati language for his essay Naivedya. He was the first vice-chancellor of Saurashtra University.

== Early life and Academic life ==
Dolarrai Mankad was born in Kutch on 23 January 1902. After completing his primary and secondary education in Saurashtra, he went to Karachi. There he joined Bharat Sarasvati Mandir as an assistant teacher for 1923–25, after which he became the principal of the same institution again for a term of 2 years. In 1927 he joined D. J. Science College as a professor for Gujarati language and Sanskrit. He held this office till the partition of India.

Then he came to India and became the principal of Vithalbhai Patel University, again for a 2-year term. In coming 7 years, he held the same office in Darbar Gopaldas University. Then he became the director of Haribhai Research Center. Then he went forward to become the first vice-chancellor of Saurashtra University, and held this position until his death.

== See also ==
- List of Gujarati-language writers
