= Anant Bajaj =

Indian business person

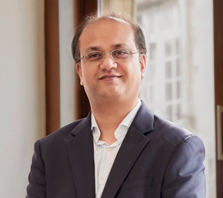
- Born: 18 May 1977; Mumbai, India
- Died: 10 August 2018 (aged 41); Mumbai, India
- Education: H.R. College; SPJIMR; Harvard Business School
- Known for: Environmental Activism (Greenpeace)

Anant Bajaj (18 May 1977 – 10 August 2018) was an Indian business magnate. He was the managing director of Bajaj Electricals Ltd which was originally founded in 1938 as Radio Lamp Works. He was also on the board of directors of Hind Lamps Ltd, Hind Musafir Ltd. and Bachhraj Factories Ltd. In addition to this, he was also a member of the Young Entrepreneur Wing of the Indian Merchants' Chamber and a member of Greenpeace.

== Early life ==
Anant Bajaj was born on 18 May 1977 in Mumbai, India. His parents were Shekhar Bajaj and Kiran Bajaj. His father is the chairman of Bajaj Electricals Ltd.

== Education ==
Anant Bajaj had a degree in commerce from Hassaram Rijhumal College of Commerce and Economics, commonly known as HR College, Mumbai and a postgraduate diploma from S.P. Jain Institute of Management and Research, Mumbai. He has also pursued OPM (Owner President Management) program at Harvard Business School in 2013.

== Career ==
Anant Bajaj officially started his career in Bajaj Electricals Ltd. as a project co-ordinator in the year 1999, though he was associated with the company since 1996 itself. He was responsible for setting up the ₹ 450 mn high mast manufacturing and galvanizing plant for the company at Ranjangaon, near Pune in 2001.

In 2005, he was appointed general manager, special assignments. Under his leadership, the exports arm, Bajaj International Pvt. Ltd. made successful forays into businesses as diverse as IT and solar products.

In February 2006, he was appointed to the board of Bajaj Electricals Ltd. as executive director. Subsequently, from 1 April 2012, he was selected as joint managing director (JMD) and on 1 June 2018, he was promoted as managing director by the Board of Directors of the company.

Anant Bajaj was primarily responsible for setting up the integrated R&D centre that focuses on cutting-edge technologies to create next-generation appliances. He also got the entire organisation on board with IoT analytics – a move that he believed will drive product development and create better offerings.

In the year 2014, he initiated the digital transformation journey of Bajaj Electricals and carried it forward through a plan known as Project Evolve. This strategic move is guiding the company towards the digital path to enhance the customer experience in the B2B and B2C segment. He was also responsible for building a state-of-the-art digital centre in Mumbai that focuses on real-time monitoring, social listening and IoT analytics.

Anant Bajaj was the driving force behind Bajaj Electricals to partner with WISeKey International Holding Ltd. to build the first IoT Trusted Platform connecting to a secure cloud to enable a digitally certified eco-system for connected appliances or objects. In an interview with Forbes, he mentioned about launching customer success/support Chatbot, which will help engage customers and solve queries in lesser turnaround time.

Another initiative by Anant Bajaj has been to connect with the youth demographic of the nation. With this aim in mind, he has ensured that the organisation partnered with youth-centric artists like Justin Bieber as its exclusive lighting partner.

Under his leadership, Bajaj Electricals became the sponsor of events with nation-wide appeal such as Pro Kabaddi, Badminton World Championships and International Federation of Sport Climbing.

In 2015, Bajaj Electricals also partnered with Cisco to participate in government's 100 smart cities project wherein active services and fittings of radio frequency, video display, cameras and street lighting will be taken care of.

Anant Bajaj Limitless Ideas Hub, a hub for entrepreneurs located in Jaipur, India is dedicated to the memory of Anant Bajaj. The hub started its operations in January 2021 and is an Initiative of Bajaj Electricals Foundation and CIIE.CO

== Death ==
Anant Bajaj died on 10 August 2018 in Mumbai, India of a cardiac arrest.
