= Avani Davda =

Indian businesswoman

- Born: India
- Citizenship: Indian
- Education: H.R. College of Commerce and Economics, Narsee Monjee Institute of Management Studies
- Organization(s): CEO at Tata Starbucks, Managing Director of Godrej Nature's Basket
- Known for: Youngest CEO in the Tata Group

Avani Davda was the first CEO at Tata Starbucks and at 33, the youngest CEO in the Tata Group. In 2014, she ranked 13 on 'The Most Innovative Women in Food and Drink' list in Fortune and Food & Wine.

She resigned from the role on 18 December 2015 being replaced by Sumi Ghosh. Now, she is the Managing Director of Godrej Nature's Basket.

Davda grew up in Mumbai and holds a bachelor’s degree from the H.R. College of Commerce and Economics and a master's degree in business administration from the Narsee Monjee Institute of Management Studies. Before her elevation to CEO, she worked at other Tata Group companies, including Tata Administrative Services, The Indian Hotels Company (Taj Hotels) and Infiniti Retail Ltd.
