= G. J. Advani Law College =

Law college in Maharastra

G.J Advani Law College
- Motto: "धर्मो रक्षती रक्षिते"
- Parent school: University of Mumbai
- Established: 1977; 49 years ago
- School type: Law School
- Location: Mumbai, Maharashtra, India; 19.064178°N 72.835245°E
- Enrollment: 300+
- Website: gjadvanilaw.edu.in

Gopaldas Jhamatmal Advani Law College (GJALC) is a law school in Mumbai, India. It has been listed among the most preferred law colleges in the West Zone of India. It is considered to be a top college for legal studies in Mumbai.

GJALC was established in 1977 by the Hyderabad (Sind) National Collegiate Board (HSNC). It was established as an affiliated college to the University of Mumbai and recognised by the Bar Council of India, New Delhi, for teaching a 3-year degree course in law (LL.B.).. From 2023 College is Providing Masters Course in Law (LL.M)

== Library ==
The college's library contains more than 11,600 documents and subscribes to over 30 national and international journals, law reports, and magazines.

== History ==
The college is named after one of the leading advocates of Sind, Shri. Gopaldas Jhamatmal Advani, who was a scholar and author of a book, Arbitration and Specific Relief Act.

== Recognitions ==
India Today, a weekly magazine (published in July 2006) ranked the college among the top 20 Law Colleges in India. The Week, a weekly magazine (published on 20 June 2010) listed the college among the Most Preferred Law Colleges in India (West Zone).

== Alumni ==
- Ali Kaashif Khan, Advocate
- Dharam Jumani, Counsel, High Court of Bombay
- Pradeep Kadu, Joint Commissioner of Sales Tax
- Harshada Kawale, Judicial Magistrate (First Class), Pune District Court
- Ashish Shelar, Member of the Maharashtra Legislative Assembly for H-West Constituency and President of Mumbai Unit of Bhartiya Janata Party.
- Priya Dutt, Former Member of Parliament from Mumbai North West constituency representing Indian National Congress party.
- Mr N. Hariharan, Chief General Manager, SEBI.
