= Deena Mehta =

Indian businesswoman

- Born: Valsad, Gujarat, India
- Education: H.R. College; SVKM's NMIMS; ICAI; Sydenham College; Chinai College
- Occupation: Managing director of Asit C. Mehta Investment Interrmediates Ltd
- Spouse: Asit C Mehta
- Children: Aakash Mehta, Aditya Mehta

Deena Mehta (Gujarati: દીના મહેતા) is an Indian businesswoman, broker, investor, financial adviser, chartered accountant and social activist. She is the managing director and chief executive officer of Asit C. Mehta Investment Intermediates Ltd. Mehta was one of the first female members of Bombay Stock Exchange, Mumbai and became its first woman president.

== Career ==
She is on the Board of Reliance Asset Reconstruction Company Limited, Gandhar Oil Refinery (India) Limited, Fino Payments Bank Limited, and NMIMS Alumni Association as an Independent Director. She is a member of the India Board of CISI Institute, a subsidiary of the London Stock Exchange. She is the promoter director of Central Depository Services Ltd. as well as the South Asian Federation of exchanges, the association of stock exchanges of SAARC countries. She has been an invitee to International Securities Regulators Organization, and member of the Index Committee and Advisory Committee on Mutual Funds of Stock Exchange, Mumbai and a member of SEBI Committees such as Review of Eligibility (CORE) norms of SEBI, Derivative Committee, Delisting Committee, Ethics Committee and Investor Education.

Mehta is Vice Chairman of Prempuri Ashram Trust. She has been a member of the board of directors of the following organizations:

- Cotton Association of India
- Board of Central Depository Services (India) Limited
- National Payment Corporation of India since August 2011
- Magma Housing Finance Ltd.
- Advisory committee of Wilson College M.Com Course
- MIT Pune Economics Faculty
- IES Management Institute
- NMIMS Business Management Course

She was also a visiting faculty on stock markets at IIM Ahmedabad, Government Law College (Mumbai).

== Awards and achievements ==
- First woman president of Bombay Stock Exchange in the 148 years of the exchange's existence
- Awarded for outstanding contribution in the field of banking and financial services by Ladies Wing Indian Merchant Chamber
- Honoured by Cosmos Bank for outstanding contribution in the field of finance in December 2005
- Awarded as outstanding Young Indian in Business Category by Indian Jaycees in 1998
- Awarded Outstanding Alumni Award by NMIMS in 2011
- Recognised as one of the Highest Tax Payers of Mumbai City for Assessment year 1995-96.

== Personal life ==
Mehta has been married to Asit Mehta since 1984 and has two sons, Aditya and Aakash, daughter-in laws Prachi Mehta and Subhasmita Chakraborty and grandson Arjun Mehta. In August 2018, Mehta discussed her upbringing and personal interests on the VartaLab podcast.
