= Bachelor of Vocational Education =

Undergraduate bachelor's degree

Bachelor of Vocation (B. Voc, BVE or BVEd) is a specialized undergraduate bachelor's degree which qualifies the graduate as a vocational teacher in public schools or trainer for private companies. Some universities, like some vocational universities (universities of applied science), offer a Bachelor of Vocational Education and Training, or a Bachelor of Career and Technical Education degree, which are basically equivalent to a B. Voc or BVE. Further, Many universities have specific vocational education bachelor's degrees to prepare agricultural, business, computer and IT, health occupations, marketing, and industrial arts teachers as well as degrees for Adult and Continuing Education.

== History ==
Vocational educators have existed since the first vocations existed. One of the main systems of vocational education was through masters and apprentices. As traditional academic institutions started to recognize the need for vocational education, there became a need to accredit potential vocational teachers within the traditional academic system. This can be seen in California through their requirement that all community college tenured vocational instructors have a bachelor's degree In Australia the Bachelor of Vocational Education and Training grew out of "an expressed need for a programme of study for training and vocational educators"

== Requirements ==
=== California ===
While each college's specific curriculum and courses may vary, nearly every college in California that offers a Bachelor of Vocational Education degree includes courses in Characteristics and Management of Education for Adult Students, Assessment and Instruction, Teaching Diverse Learners, Advanced Instructional Design, Program Evaluation and Leadership, and School Health Care as these are generally required for a Designated Subjects Vocational Education Teaching Credential.

Further, B. Voc or BVE students may generally complete a SWAN Portfolio that allows them to get college credit for experience they have had from their specific vocations.

== Value and effectiveness ==
A study done by the Department of Education of Newfoundland and Labrador, Canada, in the early 1990s found that 94% of B. Voc graduates were working in a field related to their degree compared with 80% for all graduates with an undergraduate degree. Further, B. Voc or BVE graduates earned on average $18.01–$20.00 per hour compared to $14.01–$16.00 for the general graduating population.
