= C. H. M. College =

Indian educational institution

Smt. Chandibai Himathmal Mansukhani College
- Motto: Power Through Knowledge and money
- Type: College
- Established: 1965; 58 years ago
- Affiliations: University of Mumbai
- Principal: Mrs. Manju Lalwani Pathak
- Undergraduates: 111,100 (approx)
- Postgraduates: 18000 (approx)
- Location: Ulhasnagar, Mumbai, Maharashtra, India; 19.220376°N 73.163034°E
- Website: https://www.chmcollege.in/

Smt. Chandibai Himathmal Mansukhani College, also known as Smt. C.H.M. College of Arts, Science, Commerce and Management, is one of the largest colleges in Mumbai, India. The management belongs to the Hyderabad (Sind) National Collegiate Board. It has 03 UGC sponsored community outreach centers.

The foundation stone of the college was installed on 1 January 1964 by Principal K.M. Kundnani, Rector and Secretary, H.S.N.C Board, Barrister Hotchand G. Advani, president of the Board, Late Shri Gangaram Himatmal Mansukhani.

CHM college has more than 400 teaching and non-teaching staff members on its roll and more than 9500 students in six faculties. The college offers education to students at Junior, Undergraduate Degree and Post-Graduate levels.

== Campus ==
The college is situated opposite the Ulhasnagar (forward to ambernath) railway station, in an area of 160 acres (650,000 m^{2}). It has spacious classrooms and facilities including library, offices, staff common room, canteen, annex building, conference halls, computer laboratories, upgraded laboratories in the science, psychology and geography departments and well-developed sports grounds. It is almost equidistant (about 60 km) from Mumbai, Karjat and Kasara. This college offers conventional and professional courses.

== Sports ==
It has an area of 19940 square feet, houses facilities for indoor games like Table tennis, Carrom, Chess, Gymnasium for workouts, Boxing, Weightlifting, and Judo. It has one playgrounds-one foreground . It has facilities for Handball, Volleyball, Basketball, Softball, Ball Badminton, Kabaddi, Kho Kho, Football and Athletics.

== See also ==
- List of Mumbai Colleges
