= Linking Road, Mumbai =

Road in India

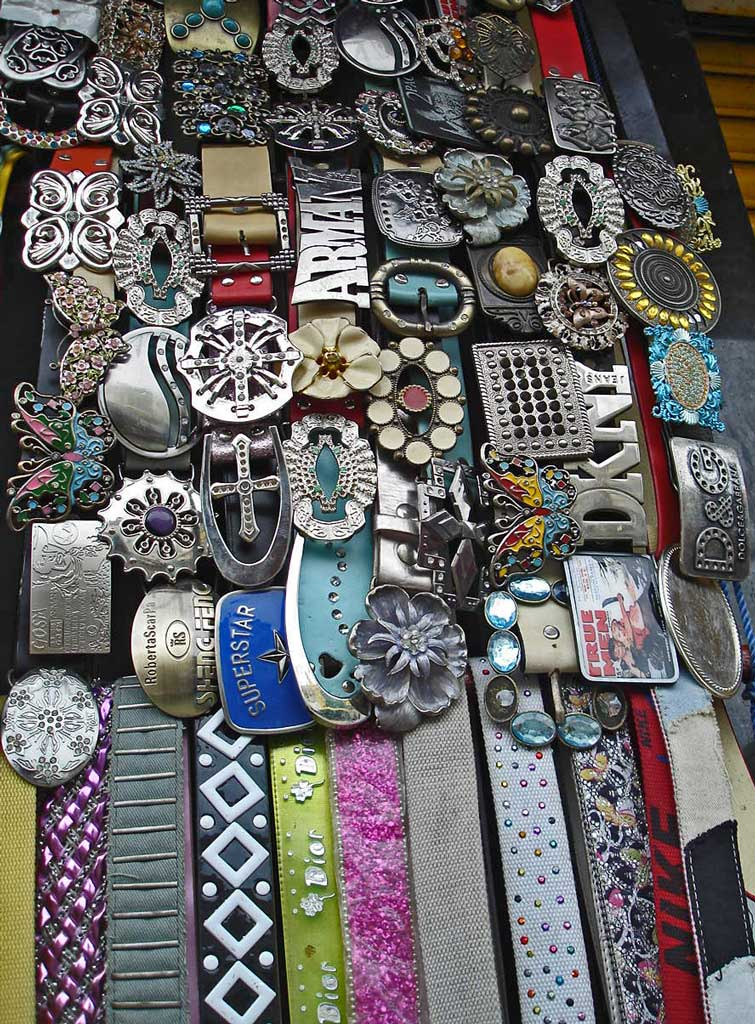
A shop selling belts on Linking road

Linking Road is a road which extends from Bandra to Santacruz West in the city of Mumbai, India which is the third largest shopping district in India in terms of revenue and footfalls.

== History ==
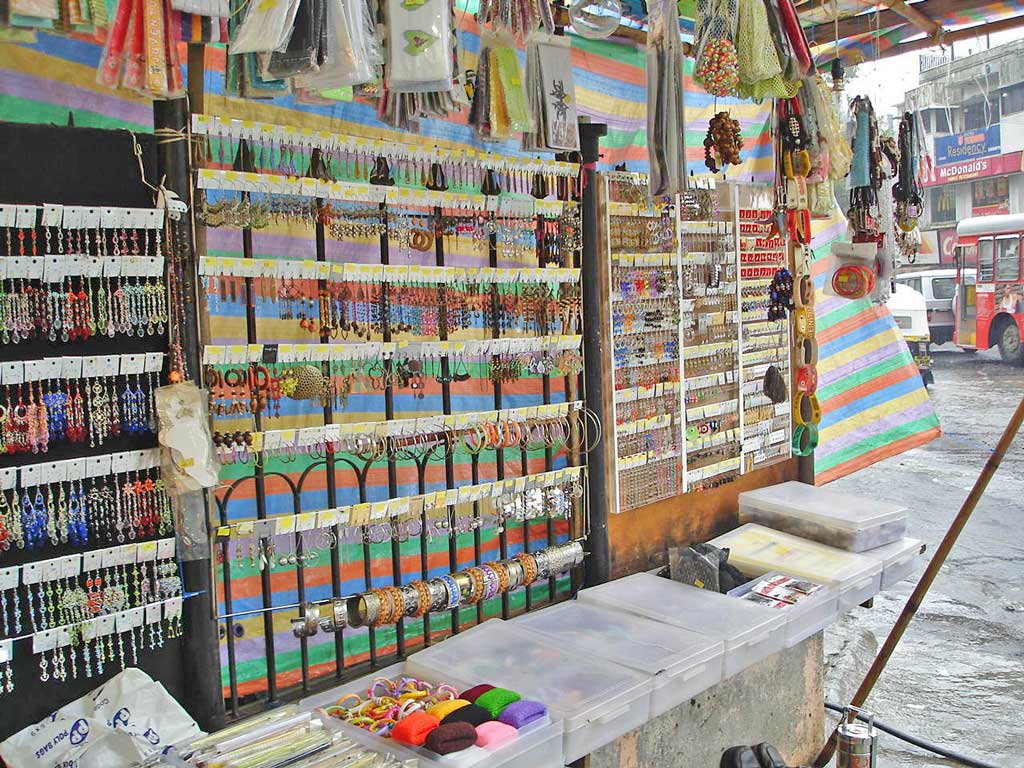
Roadside pavement shops at Bandra Linking road.

Linking Road was one of the first arterial roads "linking" the far-flung suburbs of Bandra and Juhu during the 1940s. The oldest name of the road was Dadabhai Navroji Road.

Linking Road and Hill Road were two of the main shopping hubs in the suburbs of Mumbai. Over the years this shopping hub has stretched beyond its original length. The road starts from S.V Road in Bandra and continues to Khar, and extends beyond this towards Santacruz and Juhu in the north of the city. R.D National College is situated on Linking Road.

It is a shopping hub for every pocket size with everything from street stalls selling products for a bargain to niche stores and boutiques for specialized products to high end international brands. It is the most expensive retail location in India.

Over past decade linking road has gained popularity because its night life.

In Santacruz, there is a famous Arya Samaj Mandir and on the end there is Juhu Garden, which has an aeroplane model.
