= M. M. K. College =

Private college in Mumbai, India

Shrimati M. M. K. College of Commerce & Economics
- Established: 1961; 65 years ago
- Affiliations: Mumbai University
- Principal: C.A. Kishore Peshori
- Location: Bandra, Mumbai, Maharashtra, India
- Website: www.mmk.edu.in

The Shrimati Mithibai Motiram Kundnani College of Commerce & Economics, commonly known as M. M. K. College, is a private educational institution, located in Mumbai, Maharashtra, India. It is affiliated with Mumbai University and offers a variety of courses in the field of commerce.

== History ==
The college was established in 1961 by Hyderabad (Sind) National Collegiate Board.
