= Churchgate =

Neighbourhood in Maharashtra, India

- Neighbourhood
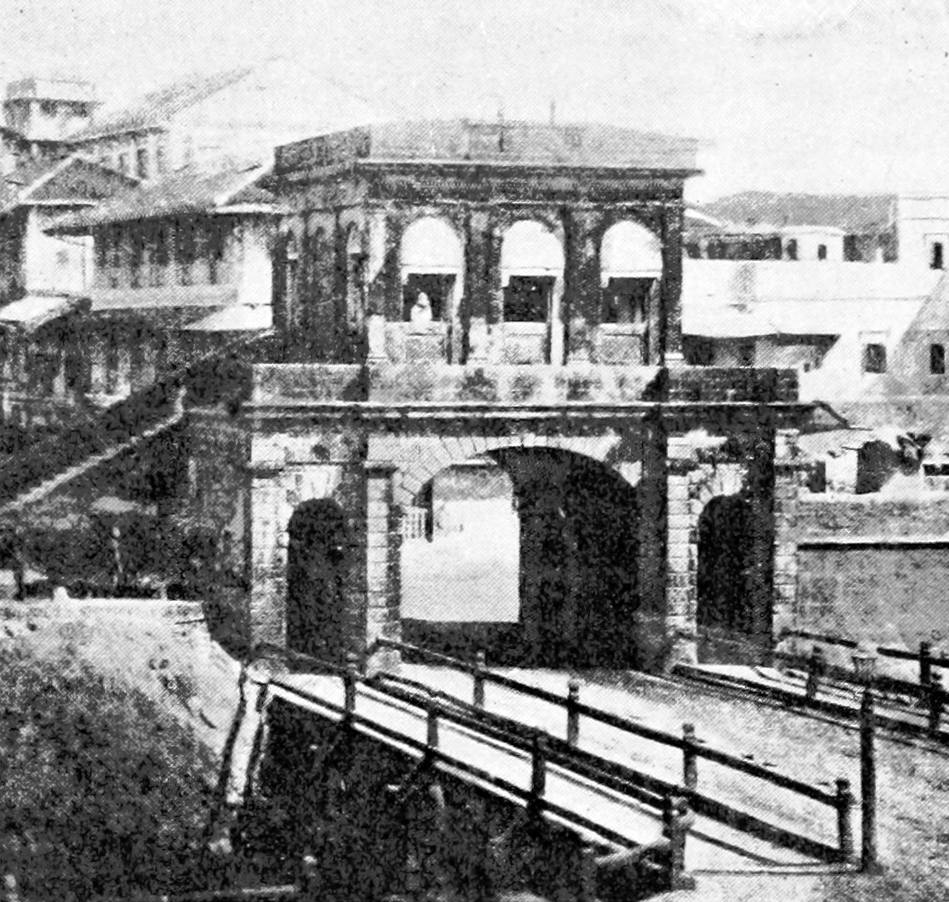
- The original gate which led to the present day St. Thomas Cathedral in 1863 was later dismantled.

- Location within India Location within Maharashtra Location within Mumbai
- Coordinates: 18.93°N 72.82°E
- Country: India
- State: Maharashtra
- District: Mumbai City
- City: Mumbai

Government
  - Type: Municipal Corporation
  - Body: Brihanmumbai Municipal Corporation (MCGM)

Languages
  - Official: Marathi
- Time zone: UTC+5:30 (IST)
- PIN: 400020
- Area code: 022
- Vehicle registration: MH 01
- Civic agency: BMC

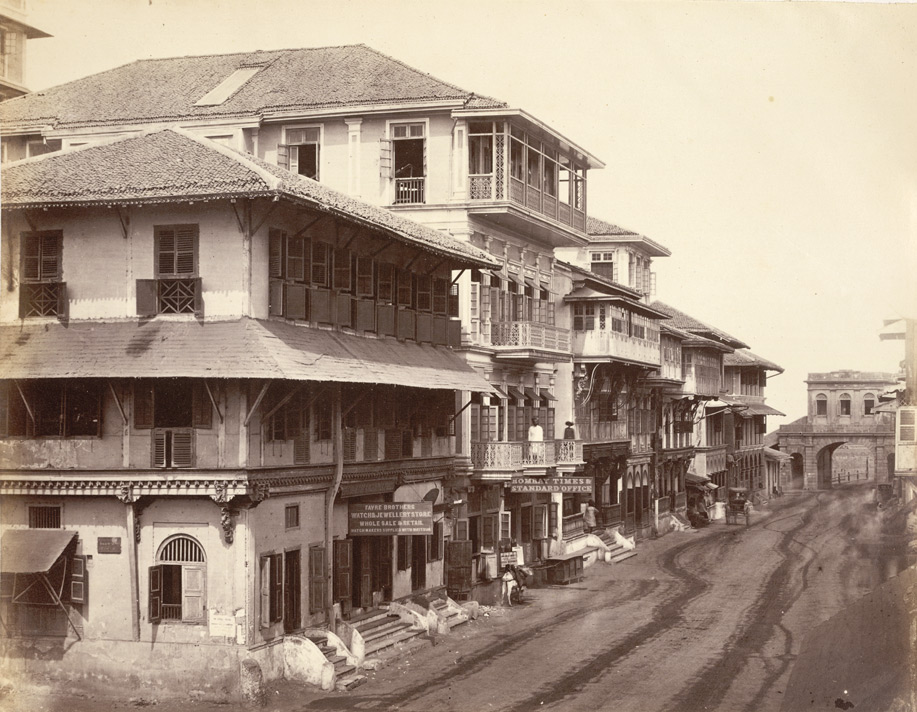
Mumbai in the 1860s with Church Gate visible in the background.

Churchgate (Marathi pronunciation: [t͡ʃəɾt͡ʃɡeːʈ]) is an area in the southern part of Mumbai, close to the Arabian Sea. The area is known for its unique architecture consisting of art deco style residential buildings, access to sporting venues, and the business area of Nariman Point.

== History ==
During the eighteenth and up to the mid-19th century, Mumbai was a walled city surrounded by a fortification. The city walls had three gates. One of the gates, Churchgate, was named after the St. Thomas Cathedral, Mumbai. The area west of the original gate came to be known as Churchgate. In the mid-19th century, the wall of the fort along with its gates was torn down to aid in the expansion of the city. At the exact location of the Churchgate, Flora Fountain was built.

== Geography ==
Arabian Sea is situated at west and Nariman Point on south of Churchgate. Churchgate railway station is a major railway terminus on the Western line of the Mumbai Suburban Railway.

== 2008 Mumbai attacks ==
On 26 November 2008, a Pakistan-trained Lashkar-e-Taiba terrorist attacked the Trident Hotel and the Oberoi hotel. This attack ended up killing as many as 30 people. The hotels are situated on the southern border of Churchgate, in the Nariman Point area. The attacks were part of a larger Mumbai terrorist attack, which killed 166 and injured 238 in an unprecedented Islamic terrorist attack. In response, Mumbai Police killed one terrorist and apprehended another, Ajmal Kasab, after which the National Security Guards (NSG) killed 8 other terrorists.

== Metro ==
Mumbai Metro's Aqua Line (Line 3) will pass through Churchgate area, with its route covering Colaba-Bandra-Seepz. Hutatma Chowk, Churchgate and Vidhan Bhavan are the stations listed for this area, and all of these will be built underground. Line 3 is expected to reduce road congestion as well as the load on the Western Line between Bandra and Churchgate.

== Places ==
Following places are located in Churchgate area of Mumbai:

- Cricket Centre – headquarters and office of Board of Control for Cricket in India
- Wankhede Stadium – an international cricket stadium
- Mumbai Cricket Association – governing body of cricket in Mumbai Metropolitan Region
- Marine Drive – a seaside promenade
- Cricket Club of India (CCI) – a prestigious sports club
- Brabourne Stadium – an old international cricket stadium, owned by CCI
- Churchgate railway station

== Colleges ==
- K.C College
- K.C. Law College
- Jamnalal Bajaj Institute of Management Studies
- H.R. College of Commerce and Economics
- Government Law College, Mumbai
- Jai Hind College
- Sydenham College
- Elphinstone College
- SNDT Women's University

== Sights ==
Tourist spots in the Churchgate area include:

- Hutatma Chowk
- Bombay High Court
- Marine Drive
- Oval Maidan

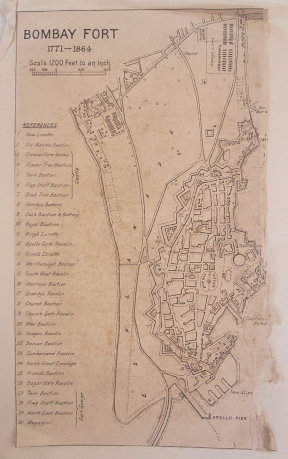

1 / Churchgate

.
