= Thadomal Shahani Engineering College =

Private College in India

- Type: Private
- Established: 1983
- Parent institution: HSNC Board
- Academic affiliations: University of Mumbai
- Principal: G. T. Thampi
- Location: Bandra, Mumbai, Maharashtra, India
- Campus: Urban
- Website: www.tsec.edu

Thadomal Shahani Engineering College (TSEC) is a private engineering college in Mumbai, India. Founded in 1983, it is the first and oldest private engineering institute affiliated with the University of Mumbai.

TSEC was founded by the Hyderabad (Sind) National Collegiate Board (HSNC Board) in 1983. It is named after one of Mumbai's philanthropists, Dada Kishinchand T. Shahani's father, Thadomal Shahani.

== Rankings ==
In 2009, TSEC secured the 28th position in a list of the top 50 private engineering colleges in India by Mint.

== Controversy ==
On 27 September 2023, a serious lift malfunction occurred at Thadomal Shahani Engineering College, causing the lift to fall from the second floor to the basement of the college's new 11-storied building. The lift had several students and a faculty member inside.

“It happened in a matter of few seconds. The lights were flickering and the lift was shaking. We were all screaming. The doors opened after we hit the ground. It was a complete mayhem.” —Anonymous TSEC Student

On 30 September 2023, the lift fell once again in a similar manner, with multiple students and a faculty member inside.

The college principal, Gopakumaran Thampi, denied the occurrence of this incident.

The principal's official statement on the matter is that he believes the students and some faculty members are purposely creating panic to force the college to "move from physical to online lectures," despite first-hand accounts of multiple students who were in the lift when it fell twice.

In Mumbai City, lifts are legally obligated to follow elevator safety laws and put in compulsory failsafes that halt the lift in case of a malfunction, such as using friction pads or automatic lift breaks. Neither of these measures was implemented in the lift at the college, leaving the college open to a liability lawsuit for negligence and the endangerment of lives.
