= Avani (given name) =

Avani is a given name, popular in South Asia, and is of Sanskrit origin, meaning "The Earth".

Notable people with the name include:

- Avani Brandt, American soccer player
- Avani Chaturvedi (born 1993), Indian pilot
- Avani Davda (born 1980), Indian executive
- Avani Dias (born 1991), Sri Lankan-Australian journalist and radio presenter
- Avani Gregg (born 2002), American social media personality
- Avani Lekhara (born 2001), Indian sportswoman
- Avani Modi, Indian actress
- Avani Nandra-Hart, a character in the BBC series EastEnders
- Avani Panchal (born 1991), Indian roller skater
- Avani Prashanth (born 2006), Indian golfer
- Avani-janashraya Pulakeshin, a Chalukya king
