= Nature's Basket =

Indian gourmet grocery delivery service

- Company type: Subsidiary of Spencer's Retail Ltd
- Industry: Food & grocery
- Founded: Mumbai, Maharashtra, India 2005
- Headquarters: Mumbai, Maharashtra, India
- Key people: Sachin Agarwal (COO); Manjir Basu (CFO)
- Products: Fruits & vegetables; Indian grocery; Snacks & beverages; Delicatessen & cheese; Eggs & meat; Confectionary & patisserie; Gift hampers
- Revenue: ▲₹; 365 Crore
- Number of employees: 1000+
- Parent: Spencer's Retail
- Website: https://naturesbasket.co.in/

Nature's Basket
- Current status: Online

Nature's Basket is an Indian grocery delivery chain of retail stores focused in gourmet food. It has a range of organic food, imported ingredients and exotic foods. The company is headquartered in Mumbai, India and has multiple stores in cities like Mumbai, Bengaluru, Pune and Kolkata. It was acquired by Spencer's Retail Ltd, a RP-Sanjiv Goenka Group company in May 2019 from the Godrej Group in an all-cash deal.

== History ==
Nature's Basket was founded in 2005 as a "world food store" and now operates 31 physical stores in cities such as Mumbai, Bengaluru, Pune and Kolkata. The retail chain sells fresh vegetables, fruits, cold cuts, meats, cheese, organic foods and dairy products. It also sells gifts.

It also operates as an online grocery store and mobile app platform which caters to 125 cities across India.

Nature's Basket acquired Mumbai-based online grocery store Ekstop.com in 2015 to strengthen its online presence across 125 cities in India.

In 2017, the company rebranded as a "Daily Food Delights" store.

The company was acquired by Spencer's Retail Ltd from Godrej Group in May 2019 in an all cash deal. The acquisition proved complementary across a number of fronts. The acquisition helped Spencer’s Retail expand its retail presence in Western India, a region for potential business growth. Natures Basket retained its brand, providing Spencer’s with a market flanking opportunity.

== Key people ==
Sachin Agarwal is the COO & Manjir Basu is the CFO of Natures Basket.

== In-house brands ==
Nature's Basket has three brands under its name for exotic and organic produce:

- L'Exclusif : exotic products such as international gourmet, nuts, conserves, savories, digestives, chocolates, ice creams
- Healthy Alternatives : organic and health-oriented food such as quinoa, gluten-free pasta, multi-grain atta (flour), pulses, roasted seed mixes. Twinkle Khanna launched the Nature's Basket Healthy Alternatives brand in Mumbai on 27 September 2016.
- Nature's : A range of dry fruits, spices, eggs, vegetables, rice, pulses, rice
- Sonam Kapoor is associated with Nature's Basket since August 2019.

== See also ==
- E-commerce in India
- Online shopping
- Godrej Group
