= Government College University Hyderabad =

Public university in Pakistan

- Other names: GCUH
- Type: Public
- Established: October 1, 1917; 108 years ago
- Accreditation: Higher Education Commission (Pakistan)
- Chancellor: Governor of Sindh
- Vice-Chancellor: Dr. Amjad Ali Arain
- Location: Hyderabad, Sindh, Pakistan
- Website: gcuh.edu.pk

The Government College University Hyderabad (GCUH) is a public university located in Hyderabad, Sindh, Pakistan.

== History ==
It was founded on 1 October 1917 by Annie Besant as Government College Kali Mori. On its 100th anniversary in 2017, Government of Sindh announced to upgrade it into a full-fledged university.

== See also ==
- List of universities in Pakistan
