= K. C. Law College, Mumbai =

Law College in Maharastra

Coordinates: 18.9297°N 72.8270°E

Kishinchand Chellaram Law College

Location
- 123, Dinshaw Wachha Road, Churchgate, Mumbai, Maharashtra, 400020, India

Information
- Type: Law College
- Established: 1955
- Principal: Dr. Kavita Lalchandani
- Campus: Urban
- Affiliations: Hyderabad (Sind) National Collegiate Board; University of Mumbai
- Website: www.kclawhsnc.edu.in

Kishinchand Chellaram Law College, popularly known as KC Law College, is a law institution located at Churchgate, Mumbai. The institution was established in 1955 by Hyderabad (Sind) National Collegiate Board (HSNC Board). It is affiliated with the University of Mumbai.

The college is located in the same campus as Kishinchand Chellaram College and the H.R. College of Commerce and Economics.

== Workshops and conferences ==
=== 23 July 2019 ===
A workshop on the Magic of Forgiveness was organized in collaboration with Sadhu Vaswani Mission. A team from Sadhu Vaswani Mission consisting of Mrs. Neelam Deissiza, Ms. Asha Kripalani and Mr. Hitesh Mulchandani conducted the program.

=== 9 August 2019 ===
A workshop on the Draft of National Education Policy was organized at K. C. Law College to recommend the changes in the education which has been forwarded to the Ministry of Human Resource Development, Government of India. In the said workshop the teaching staff of South Mumbai Campus Colleges of H.S.N.C. Board i.e. K. C. College, H.R. College, Bombay Teachers Training College and Prin. K. M. Kudnani, College of Pharmacy were involved in drafting the recommendations. Prin. Dinesh Panjwani, Secretary, H.S.N.C. Board conducted the workshop.

=== 15 January 2020 ===
The Department of Law, University of Mumbai and K. C. Law College jointly organized a Workshop on Self Defense for female students. Dr. Rajeshri Varhadi, Head of the Department of Law, and Prin. Dr. Kavita Lalchandani emphasized the need for such workshops for Women empowerment and their importance for women during the time of need. The trainer was Shri Shivaji Pawar who gave demonstrations along with his assistants. Many female students voluntarily participated in the workshop.

=== 16 January 2020 ===
A workshop was organized on digital literacy for women by Maharashtra State Commission for Women in collaboration with Kishinchand Chellaram Law College for study of social change. The workshop was attended by more than 200 women participants from both rural and urban areas. The workshop was inaugurated by Principal Dr. Kavita Lalchandani and Ms. Rupali Kapse, Trainer on behalf of MSCW.

The trainer started her session with the role and function of State Commission for women. She further explained the various applications which the government has started for digitalization of various things i.e. banking, complaints, etc.

== Facilities ==
The institution is able to offer a number of facilities to the students and others. Some of such facilities include the following;

=== Smart Class Board Room ===
Classrooms are equipped with audiovisual technology and interactive smart boards.

=== Moot Court Room ===
This helps in simulating the court room experience. The college hosts the Annual National Moot Court Competition every year.

=== Computer Lab ===
The KCLC campus has computer labs.

=== Alumni Association Room ===
The KCLC campus has Alumni Association Room for the alumnus of college. Also alumni have the chance to stay in contact with their college and with former fellow students.

=== College Administration Office ===
The KCLC Administration Office helps the students for all administrative work.

=== Canteen ===
The two canteens, "Butterfly" and "Kool Cafeteria", in the compound offer hygienic mini meals, snacks, tea, coffee, cold drinks, etc.

=== Indoor Games and Sports ===
The college provides facility to play carrom, chess, and other similar games.

== Courses ==
The college offers a three-year Bachelor of Laws course and also various other certificate courses on intellectual property rights, world trade laws and alternative dispute resolution.

== Notable alumni ==
- Ram Naik, Indian politician
- Justice A. M. Khanwilkar, Judge, Supreme Court of India
- Justice P.B Colabavala, Judge, Bombay High Court
- Justice Aloysius Aguiar, Additional Judge, Bombay High Court
- Arif Bookvala, Senior Counsel, Bombay High Court
- Sanjay Hegde, Senior Advocate, Supreme Court of India
- Karan Mehta, Barrister, Bombay High Court
- Aaditya Thackeray, Indian politician
