= R. D. National College =

Educational institute in Mumbai, India

Rishi Dayaram and Seth Hassaram National College and Seth Wassiamull Assomull Science College
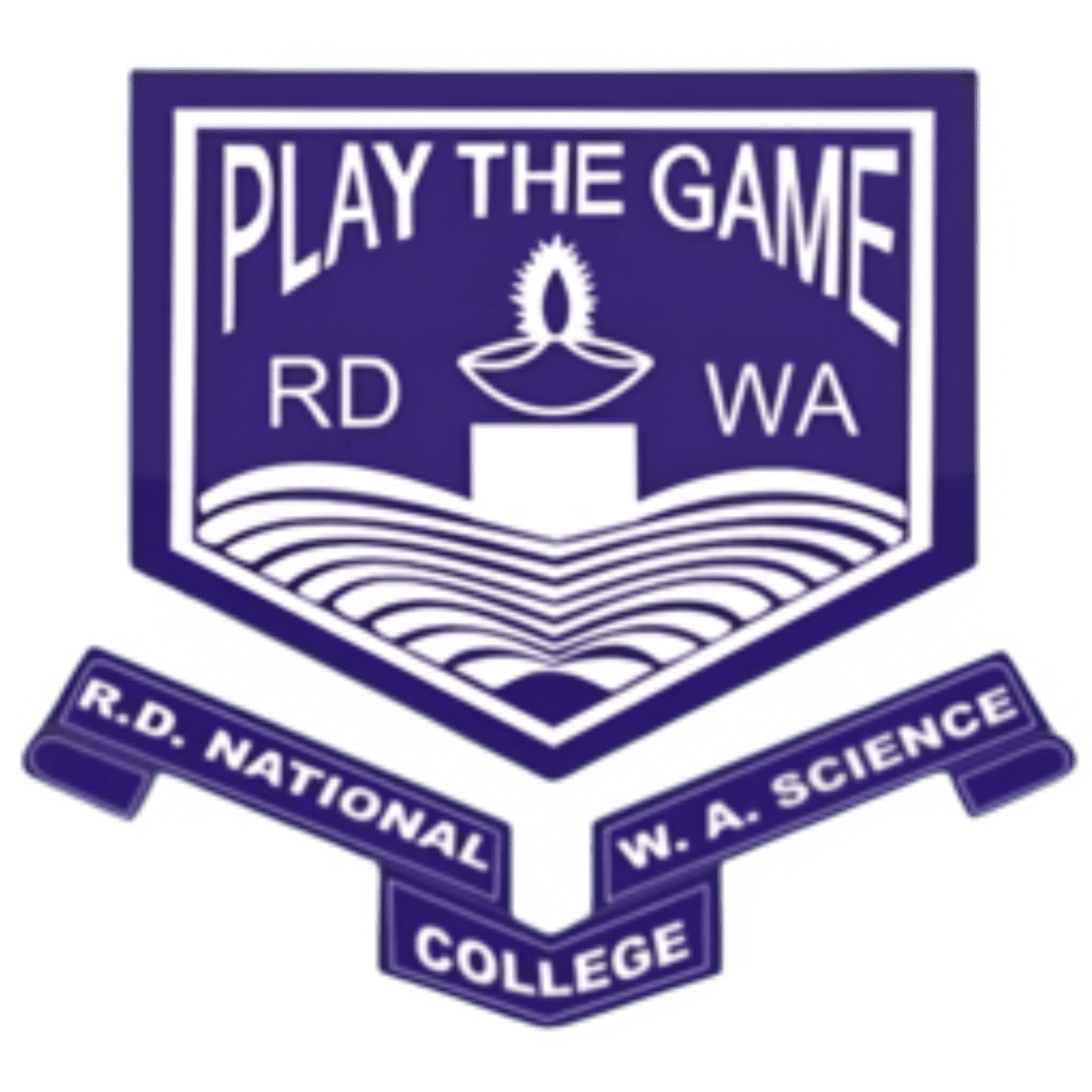
- Other names: R. D. & S. H. National College; National College
- Motto: Play The Game
- Type: Junior and Degree College
- Established: 1922; 104 years ago
- Founder: K.M. Kundnani
- Parent institution: Hyderabad (Sind) National Collegiate Board
- Academic affiliations: HSNC University
- Principal: Neha Jagtiani
- Location: Linking Road, Bandra (West), Mumbai, Maharashtra, 400050, India
- Website: www.rdnational.ac.in

Rishi Dayaram and Seth Hassaram National College and Seth Wassiamull Assomull Science College, popularly known as R. D. National College, is an education institute on Linking Road in Bandra, Mumbai, Maharashtra, India. It is managed by the Hyderabad (Sind) National Collegiate Board (HSNCB).

== Notable alumni ==
- S. P. Hinduja, billionaire industrialist
- Amjad Khan, actor
- Arjun Kanungo, singer and actor
