= Hiranandani (disambiguation) =

Hiranandani may refer to:

== People ==
- Gulab Mohanlal Hiranandani (1931–2009), Indian navy officer
- Lakhumal Hiranand Hiranandani (1917–2013), Indian otorhinolaryngologist
- Niranjan Hiranandani (born 1950), Indian billionaire
- Popati Hiranandani (1924–2005), Indian writer
- Surendra Hiranandani, Indian entrepreneur
- Tushar Hiranandani (born 1975), Indian film director
- Veera Hiranandani, American writer
- Priya Hiranandani-Vandrevala (born 1977), Indian entrepreneur

== Other uses ==
- Hiranandani Estate, township in India
- Hiranandani Gardens, Mumbai, township
- Hiranandani Group, real estate company in India
- Hiranandani Parks, Chennai, township
- Hiranandani Upscale School, school in India
- Dr. L. H. Hiranandani College of Pharmacy, college in India
