= Vandrevala =

Vandrevala may refer to:

- Priya Hiranandani-Vandrevala (born 1977), Indian entrepreneur
- Vandrevala Foundation, mental health organization
