= Joseph Ryan Smolarz =

American otolaryngologist and businessman

Joseph Ryan Smolarz is an American otolaryngologist and businessman. He has served as a physician at Virgin Islands Ear, Nose and Throat in St. Thomas since 2010.

== Early life and education ==
A native of Texas, Smolarz earned a Bachelor of Arts degree in Microbiology from the University of Texas at Austin in 1998. He received his Doctor of Medicine from the University of Texas Medical Branch and completed his residency in otolaryngology at the University of Texas Health Science Center at Houston in 2010. He later earned an Executive MBA from the University of Miami Herbert Business School in 2018.

== Career ==
In 2010, Smolarz joined the Virgin Islands Ear, Nose and Throat clinic in St. Thomas as a board-certified otolaryngologist and head and neck surgeon.

In March 2017, Smolarz was a member of the surgical team that performed the first cleft palate repair surgery in the U.S. Virgin Islands at Schneider Regional Medical Center. In the same year, Smolarz founded the company Smell Again, served as an administrator with Beehive Homes assisted living facilities, and worked as a financial trader with Dragon King Capital. In 2018, he became a specialist with Strategic Storage Investing.

In 2021, Smolarz co-founded the management firm STOR Partners and served as the blockchain lead for its associated SToR Token. In 2022, he launched a medical enterprise under the name "Dr. Ryan's."

== Personal life ==
Smolarz is married and has two children. He is an aviation enthusiast and holds private pilot and multi-engine certifications.

== Awards and honors ==
During his medical residency, Smolarz received the Adam T. Ross Memorial Award from the American Academy of Otolaryngology–Head and Neck Surgery for service and leadership. He won the University of Texas Houston Resident Manuscript Competition in 2009 and placed second in 2010.

Smolarz holds several patents for medical innovations, including a treatment formulation for acid reflux and a wireless bone-conduction audio device for hearing enhancement. He is a Fellow of the American College of Surgeons (FACS) and a member of the American Academy of Sleep Medicine and the American Academy of Otolaryngic Allergy.
