= Priya Hiranandani-Vandrevala =

Indian entrepreneur and philanthropist

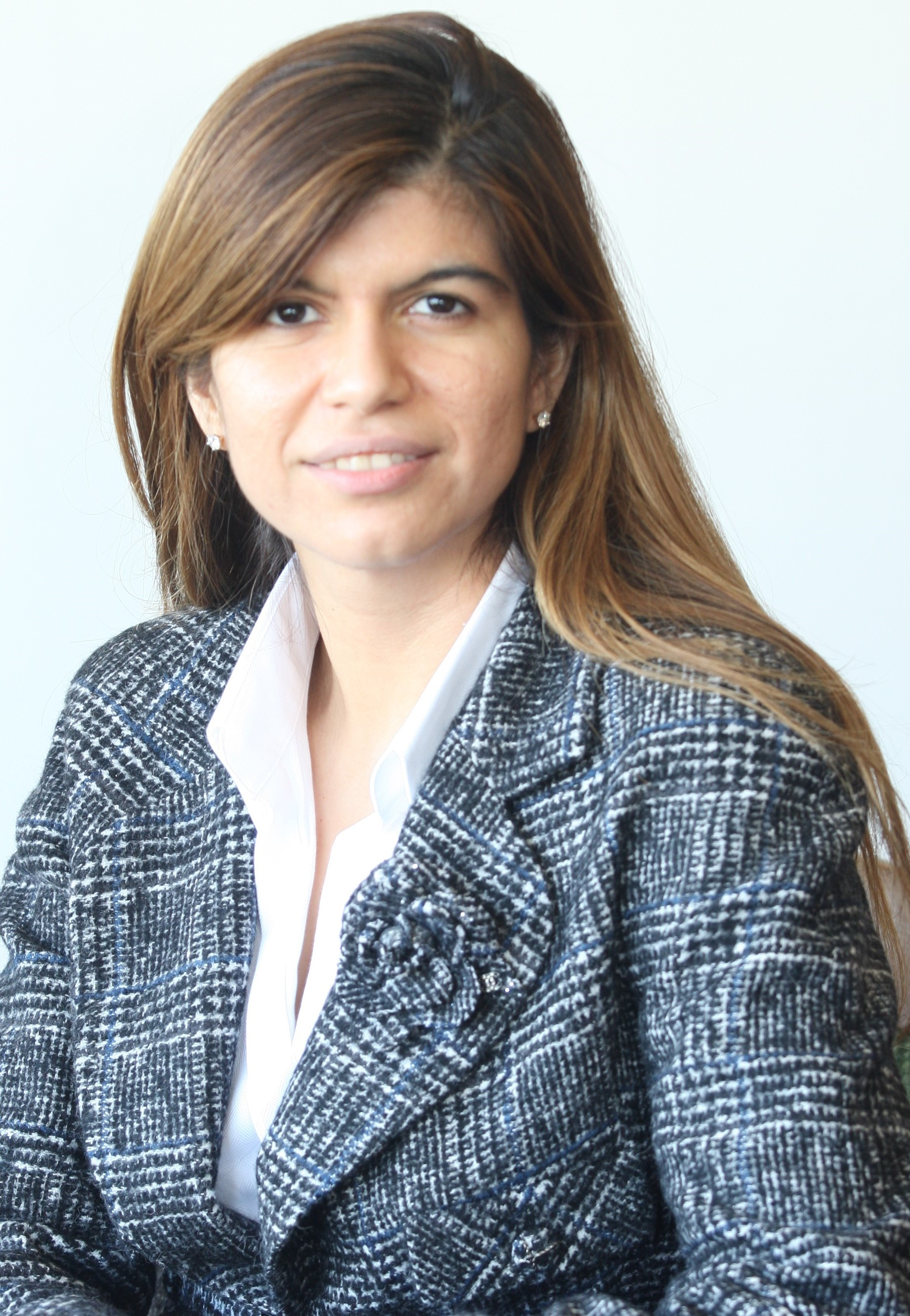
- Priya Hiranandani-Vandrevala
- Born: Priya Hiranandani; Mumbai, Maharashtra, India
- Education: University of Mumbai
- Occupations: Entrepreneur, Philanthropist, Founder of Zenta Group, Hirco & Vandrevala Foundation
- Spouse: Cyrus Vandrevala
- Children: 2
- Father: Niranjan Hiranandani
- Relatives: Lakhumal Hiranand Hiranandani (grandfather)

Priya Hiranandani-Vandrevala (born 1977) is an Indian entrepreneur and philanthropist, founder and former CEO of Zenta Group, a business process outsourcing firm. She co-founded and served as CEO of Hirco, a real estate company. She is the co-founder of the Vandrevala Foundation, a non-profit organization focused on mental health, along with her husband, Cyrus. She was listed by the World Economic Forum as one of its Young Global Leaders in 2011.

In 2012, she was named among the Evening Standard's top philanthropists and in 2018, she and her husband were listed in the Asian Rich List with a combined net worth of £2.1 billion.

== Early life and education ==
Priya completed her postgraduate studies at the University of Mumbai. She is also a chartered accountant by education. She is the daughter of Niranjan Hiranandani.

== Career ==
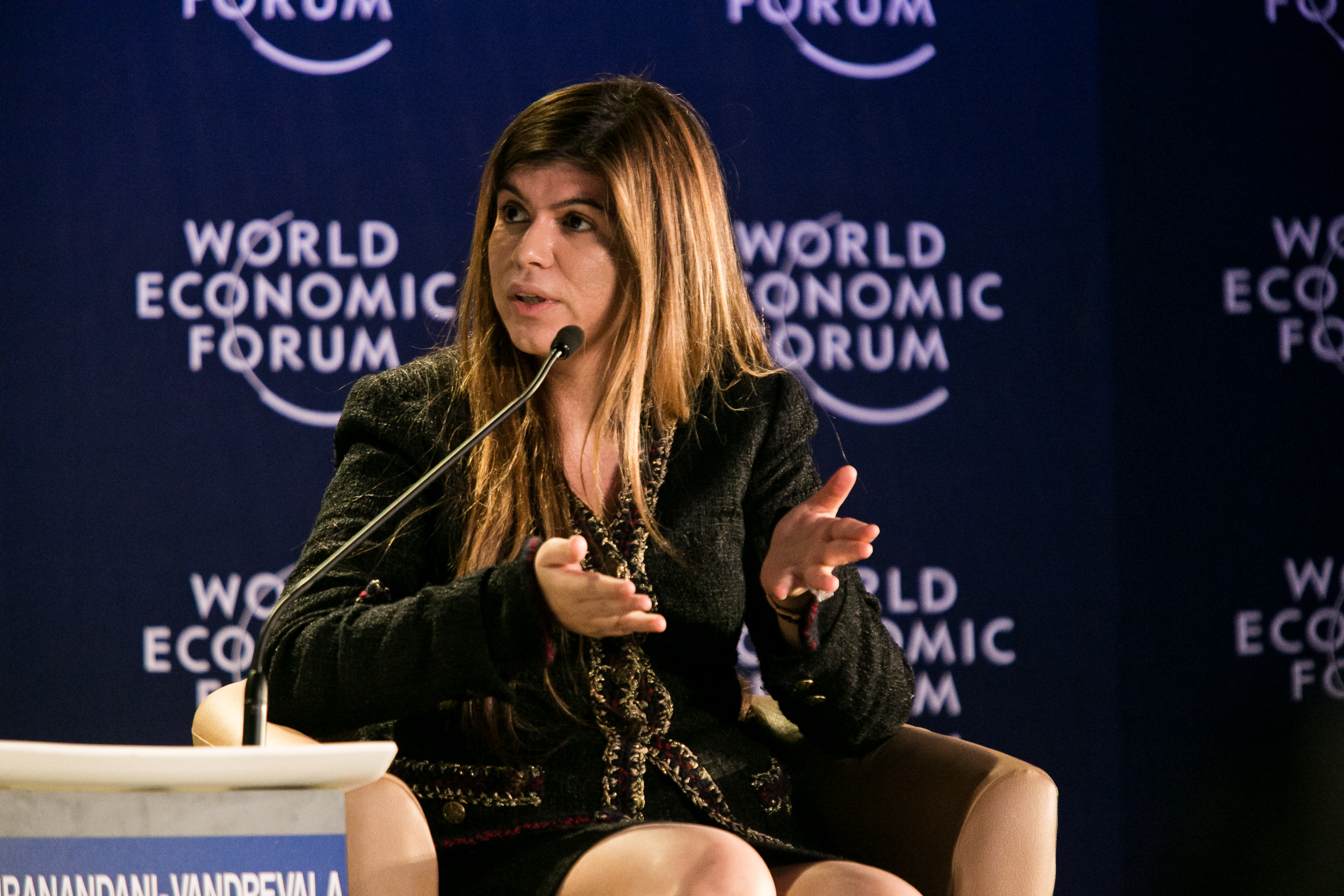
Priya Hiranandani-Vandrevala at the World Economic Forum in 2012

Priya Hiranandani began her career with Arthur Andersen, a corporate finance firm. In 2000, Priya Hiranandani-Vandrevala founded Zenta Group, a business process outsourcing (BPO) company, which provided services to financial institutions. The company was headquartered in Wayne, Pennsylvania, with operational offices in India. Priya served as the CEO of Zenta.

By 2004, it became one of the largest BPO companies in India, as per NASSCOM. In 2005, she sold Zenta to H-Cube LLC, a US based company affiliated with private equity firm GTCR for US$80 million (then around ₹350 crore), reportedly by Business Standard. However, reports from both BizJournals and Livemint suggest the sale value to be US$100 million, equivalent to ₹427.9 crores at that time.

In late 2004, Priya took charge of Hiranandani Software and Systems, a software company and she was credited with its successful restructuring. She also served as the chief executive officer of buildbyte.com, which was a construction portal in India with a focus on the e-commerce sector.

In 2006, she co-founded Hirco, a real estate company and served as its CEO until 2010. The company later secured a listing on London Stock Exchange's Alternative Investment Market, with an infusion of £350 million directed towards two projects situated in Chennai and Panvel near Mumbai.

In 2011, Priya Hiranandani-Vandrevala initiated an arbitration case, alleging a breach of a business association agreement by her father, Niranjan Hiranandani and brother, Darshan Hiranandani. The dispute centered around nearly 28 real estate projects valued at approximately ₹3,000 crore. Priya claimed that these projects violated the agreement, which required exclusive transactions between her, Niranjan and Darshan when acquiring and developing land. The arbitration case drew notice for its panel, which included Cherie Blair, wife of former British Prime Minister Tony Blair, Ajit Prakash Shah, ex-chief justice of the Delhi High Court and Lucy Reed, a UK Queen's Counsel. In August 2013, London Court of International Arbitration's Indian subsidiary ruled in favor of Priya in the family business dispute with the Hiranandani Group after over two-and-a-half years of arbitration.

In 2016, the Bombay High Court issued an interim directive, ordering Niranjan Hiranandani to pay ₹520 crore in compensation to Priya Hiranandani Vandrevala for breach of trust and infringement of the terms of a business agreement.

At the 2012 World Economic Forum in Davos, Switzerland, she chaired the WEF Real Estate Community's Steering Board. In past, Priya was a member of the Indian Merchants' Chamber and served as a representative in its Telecom and IT Committee, advising the Indian government on various IT-related matters. She co-founded Veldos, a BPO business, and H Living Inc, a real estate development company.

== Work ==
She is engaged in various social and philanthropic activities. In 2008, Priya founded the Vandrevala Foundation, a non-profit that supports mental health care. She launched the Mental Health - India initiative in 2009, for creating awareness about mental health and providing support services. The foundation has implemented various initiatives, including a free helpline offering confidential counseling and referrals for mental health services.

She collaborated with organizations such as the Gujarat Police, Emmanuel Hospital Association, St Stephen's Hospital, Delhi and the Mar Thoma Syrian Church to promote mental health on various occasions. She serves as a patron of the Elephant Family, a wildlife charity run by Mark Shand and is also a board member of The American School in London. She is a trustee on the University of Pennsylvania Medicine Board.

In November 2013, Priya and her husband hosted the 65th birthday celebration of Prince Charles at Buckingham Palace. Prince Charles conveyed his gratitude to the Vandrevalas for sponsoring the event, with the proceeds subsequently donated to various charitable organizations.

== Personal life ==
Priya is married to Cyrus Vandrevala, a UK-based businessman and investor. She is originally from Mumbai, India, currently lives in London. The couple has two sons, named Jeh and Anand.

== Controversies ==
=== Alleged Infringement of copyright and trademark ===
In February 2014, a legal dispute arose as Niranjan and Surendra Hiranandani, along with Hiranandani Constructions Pvt Ltd (HCPL), filed a suit in the Bombay High Court. They sought to prevent Priya Hiranandani-Vandrevala from using the name 'Hiranandani' in her business, following her establishment of Hiranandani Living Pvt Ltd (HLPL) in May 2013. The petition challenged the name usage and seeking ₹50 crore for the alleged copyright infringement.

In response to objections, HLPL issued a four-page letter, dismissing the claims as false and misleading. Priya, who also owned 10 registered 'Hiranandani' trademarks since 2008, argued the name's generic nature, calling it a common Sindhi surname and HLPL asserted no similarity with HCPL, citing the distinct words 'constructions' and 'living'.

=== Defamation case against The Sunday Times ===
In October 2015, Priya Hiranandani filed a defamation case against Times Newspapers Ltd., the publisher of the British newspaper The Sunday Times, for publishing a defamatory and false article related to a legal case involving her company Hirco, in August 2015. The High Court ruled the statements were defamatory, and The Sunday Times settled the claim in November 2016 by issuing apologies online and in print formats and removing the defamatory article from its website.

== Awards and recognition ==
- In 2001, she received the Indo-American Society for Young Entrepreneurs award.
- In 2012, Priya and her husband were included in the Evening Standard's list of London's top philanthropists.
- In 2012, The World Economic Forum inducted her into the Forum of Young Global Leaders.
- In 2018, Priya and her husband, Cyrus Vandrevala, were featured in the Asian Rich List with a net worth of £2.1 billion, compiled by the Asian Media Group and UBS.
- In October 2021, her organization, the Cyrus and Priya Vandrevala Foundation won India Today's Healthgiri Award for Best Mental Health Counseling, presented by Union Minister Mansukh Mandaviya.
