= Information technology in India =

The information technology (IT) industry in India comprises information technology services and business process outsourcing. The IT–BPM sector contributes approximately 7.5% to the GDP of India. According to NASSCOM, India's technology industry revenue is estimated to reach $315 billion in FY 2026, up 6.1% from a revised $297 billion in FY 2025. In FY 2026, export revenue is estimated at $246 billion and domestic revenue at $69 billion (up from $224.4 billion in exports and $58.2 billion in domestic revenue in FY 2025). The IT–BPM sector employs an estimated 5.95 million people directly in FY 2026, up from 5.8 million in FY 2025. IT units registered with state-run Software Technology Parks of India (STPI) exported software worth ₹10.64 lakh crore in FY 2024–25, while combined exports from STPI and Special Economic Zones (SEZs) stood at ₹11.59 lakh crore in 2021–22.

== History ==
The Electronics Committee also known as the "Bhabha Committee" created a 10-year (1966–1975) plan laying the foundation for India's IT Service Industries. The industry was born in Mumbai in 1967 with the establishment of Tata Consultancy Services who in 1977 partnered with Burroughs which began India's export of IT services. The first software export zone, SEEPZ – the precursor to the modern-day IT park – was established in Mumbai in 1973. More than 80 percent of the country's software exports were from SEEPZ in the 1980s.

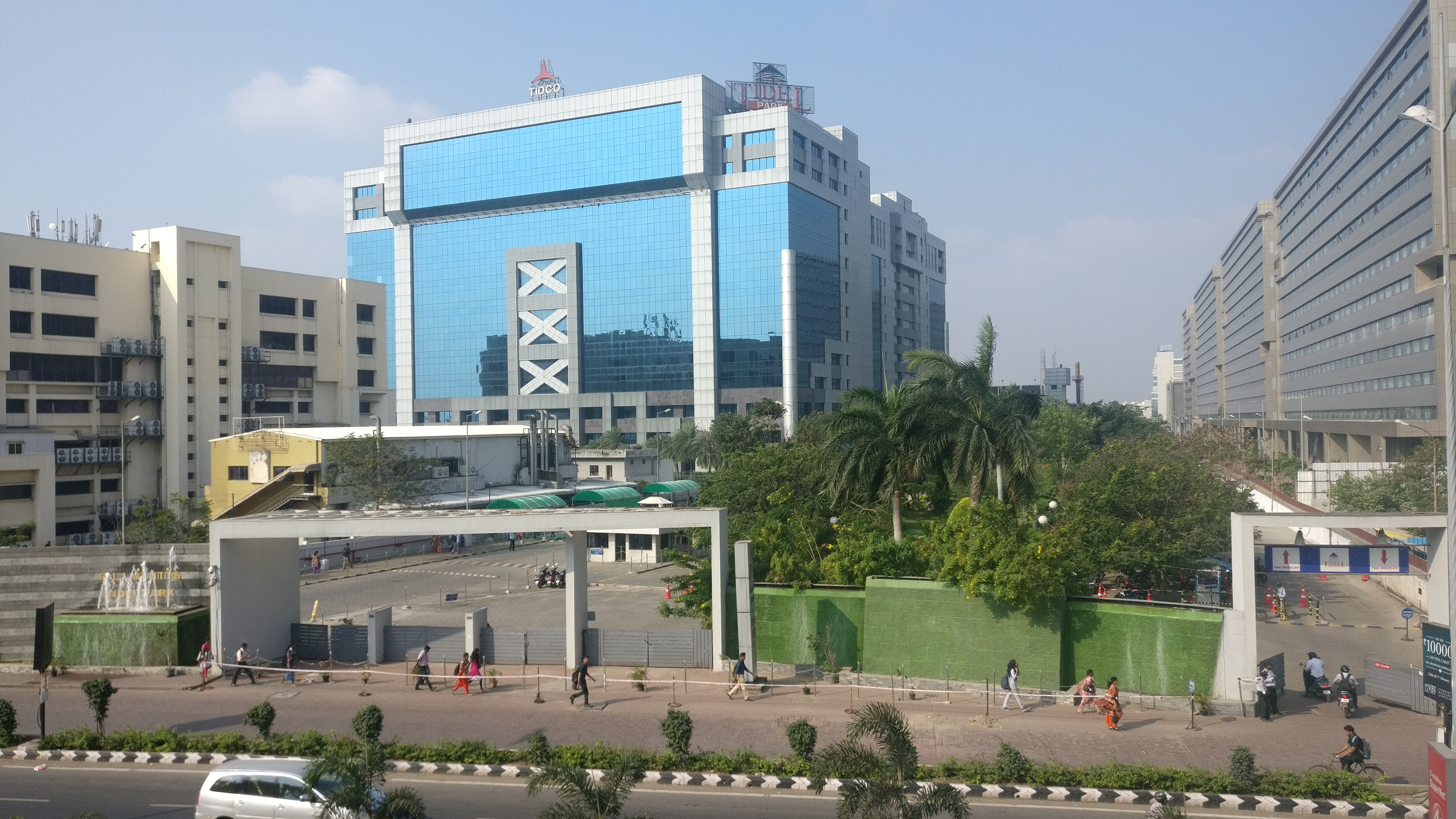
TIDEL Park in Chennai was the largest IT park in Asia when it was opened in 1999.

Regulated VSAT links became visible in 1994. Desai (2006) describes the steps taken to relax regulations on linking in 1991:

In 1991 the Department of Electronics broke this impasse, creating a corporation called Software Technology Parks of India (STPI) that, being owned by the government, could provide VSAT communications without breaching its monopoly. STPI set up software technology parks in different cities, each of which provided satellite links to be used by firms; the local link was a wireless radio link. In 1993 the government began to allow individual companies their own dedicated links, which allowed work done in India to be transmitted abroad directly. Indian firms soon convinced their American customers that a satellite link was as reliable as a team of programmers working in the clients' office.

A joint EU-India group of scholars was formed on 23 November 2001 to further promote joint research and development. On 25 June 2002, India and the European Union agreed to bilateral cooperation in the field of science and technology. India has been an associate member state of CERN since 2017. A joint India–EU Software Education and Development Center was planned for Bangalore.

== Automation and layoffs ==
In the last decade, most of the IT companies developed indigenous R&D and innovation capabilities to develop homegrown IT products. As the IT–BPM sector evolves, many are concerned that artificial intelligence (AI) will drive significant automation and destroy jobs in the coming years.

The rise of AI-powered code generation tools like ChatGPT, Gemini, and Copilot has sparked discussions about their potential impact on programming jobs. Such tools can automate some coding tasks, which may change the skills required for programming roles. According to the tracking website Layoffs.fyi, more than 500,000 technology workers worldwide were laid off between 2022 and April 2024. A 2024 study published in the Harvard Business Review found that demand for freelance work in writing, coding and image creation fell after the release of ChatGPT and AI image generators, with job postings in some categories declining by up to 30 percent.

A 2018 article published by the Center for the Advanced Study of India (CASI) at the University of Pennsylvania noted that India handles 65 percent of global IT offshore work and 40 percent of global business process outsourcing, and cited a World Bank estimate that 69 percent of jobs in India are threatened by automation. One report indicates that 640,000 low-skilled service jobs in the IT sector are at risk due to automation, while only 160,000 mid- to high-skilled positions will be created in the IT and BPO service sectors. Goldman Sachs has predicted that advances in artificial intelligence (AI) could potentially automate the equivalent of 300 million full-time jobs globally.

In 2024, technology companies including Google, Amazon, Meta, and Cisco announced job cuts, attributed to a mix of AI adoption, economic conditions and cost reduction. In March 2024, Vineet Nayar, former CEO of HCL, said that AI could leave IT companies needing up to 70 percent fewer people, as repetitive and data-entry-heavy work such as coding, testing, maintenance and responding to trouble tickets is taken over by AI.

== Attrition rate ==
The Indian IT-BPM industry has historically had high employee attrition rates. In recent years, the industry has seen a surge in resignations at all levels.

== Statistics ==
=== Indian IT revenues ===
Indian IT and BPM industry's revenues
	in US$ (as of FY26)
Export revenues	246 billion
Domestic revenues	69 billion
Total IT Revenues	315 billion
Total direct employees in IT sector:	59.5 lakh (5.95 million)

The contribution of the IT sector in India's GDP rose from 1.2% in 1998 to 7% in 2019. Exports dominate the Indian IT industry and constitute about 79% of the industry's total revenue. However, the domestic market is also significant, with robust revenue growth.

The industry's share of total Indian exports (merchandise plus services) increased from less than 4% in FY1998 to about 25% in FY2012. The technologically inclined services sector in India accounts for 40% of the country's GDP and 30% of export earnings as of 2006, while employing only 25% of its workforce, according to Sharma (2006). In 2012, Gartner ranked the largest Indian IT services providers as Tata Consultancy Services, Infosys, Wipro, Tech Mahindra, and HCL Technologies. In 2022, companies in the sector faced high employee attrition and intense competition for talent.

=== State/UT wise revenue in IT exports from STPI registered units ===
Below is the State/UT-wise list of IT and ITeS export revenues from units registered under the Software Technology Parks of India (STPI) scheme for FY 2025–26, as presented to Parliament by the Ministry of Electronics and Information Technology.

S.No	State/UT	Revenue in IT exports (₹ Cr) (2025–26)
1	Karnataka	350,184.78
2	Maharashtra	162,594.11
3	Telangana	113,101.83
4	Tamil Nadu	60,591.28
5	Uttar Pradesh	28,442.69
6	Haryana	26,885.28
7	West Bengal	10,888.26
8	Andhra Pradesh	5,057.15
9	Odisha	3,492.42
10	Kerala	3,447.61
11	Gujarat	3,150.69
12	Rajasthan	2,072.05
13	Punjab	1,623.02
14	Madhya Pradesh	681.63
15	Delhi	652.08
16	Chandigarh	414.34
17	Puducherry	207.78
18	Meghalaya	147.54
19	Goa	81.21
20	Chhattisgarh	75.93
21	Uttarakhand	56.68
22	Jharkhand	30.41
23	Jammu & Kashmir	19.55
24	Assam	0.65
25	Bihar	—
26	Himachal Pradesh	—
27	Sikkim	—
India (Total)		773,898.97

=== Largest Indian IT companies in India ===
The table below lists the largest IT services companies in India, sorted by market capitalization. In September 2021, TCS recorded a market capitalization of US$ 200 billion, making it the first Indian IT tech company to do so. On 24 August 2021, Infosys became the fourth Indian company to reach $100 billion in market capitalization.

Rank	Company name	Market capitalization (15 October 2026)	Revenue (FY 2025–26)
1	Tata Consultancy Services	₹833,933 crore (US$89 billion)	₹267,021 crore (US$29 billion)
2	Infosys	₹441,540 crore (US$47 billion)	₹178,650 crore (US$19 billion)
3	HCLTech	₹360,103 crore (US$38 billion)	₹130,144 crore (US$14 billion)
4	Cognizant	US$26.9 billion	US$21.1 billion
5	Wipro	₹169,302 crore (US$18 billion)	₹92,620 crore (US$9.9 billion)
6	Tech Mahindra	₹154,395 crore (US$16 billion)	₹56,815 crore (US$6.1 billion)

== Major IT hubs ==
=== Bengaluru ===
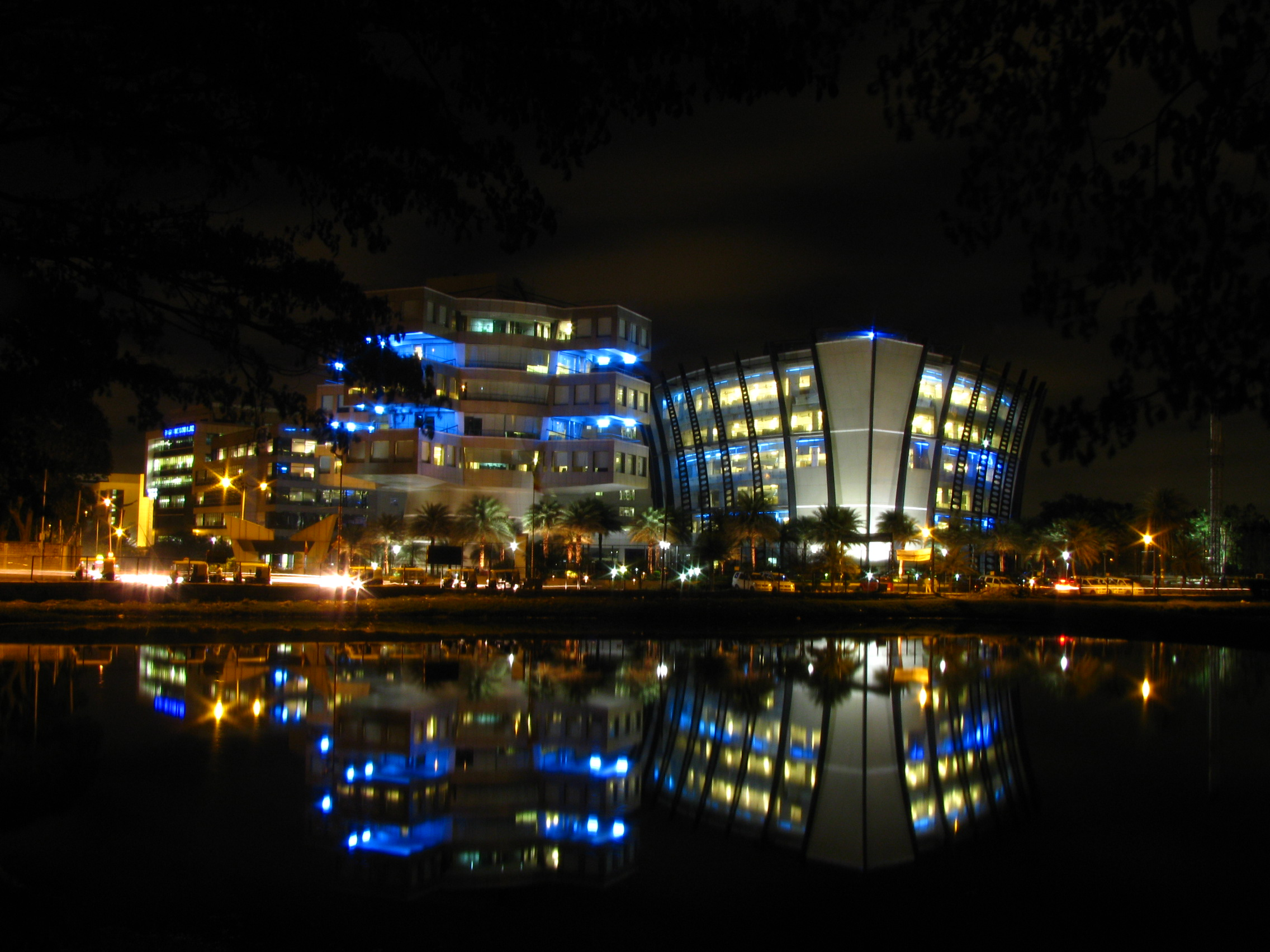
Offices of Oracle and others in Bengaluru, India

Bengaluru is a global technology hub and is India's biggest tech hub. As of fiscal 2016–17, Bengaluru accounted for 38% of total IT exports from India worth $45 billion, employing 10 lakh people directly and 30 lakh indirectly. The city is known as the "Silicon Valley of India".

Bengaluru is also known as the "startup capital of India"; the city is home to 44 percent of all Indian unicorn startup companies as of 2020.

=== Hyderabad ===
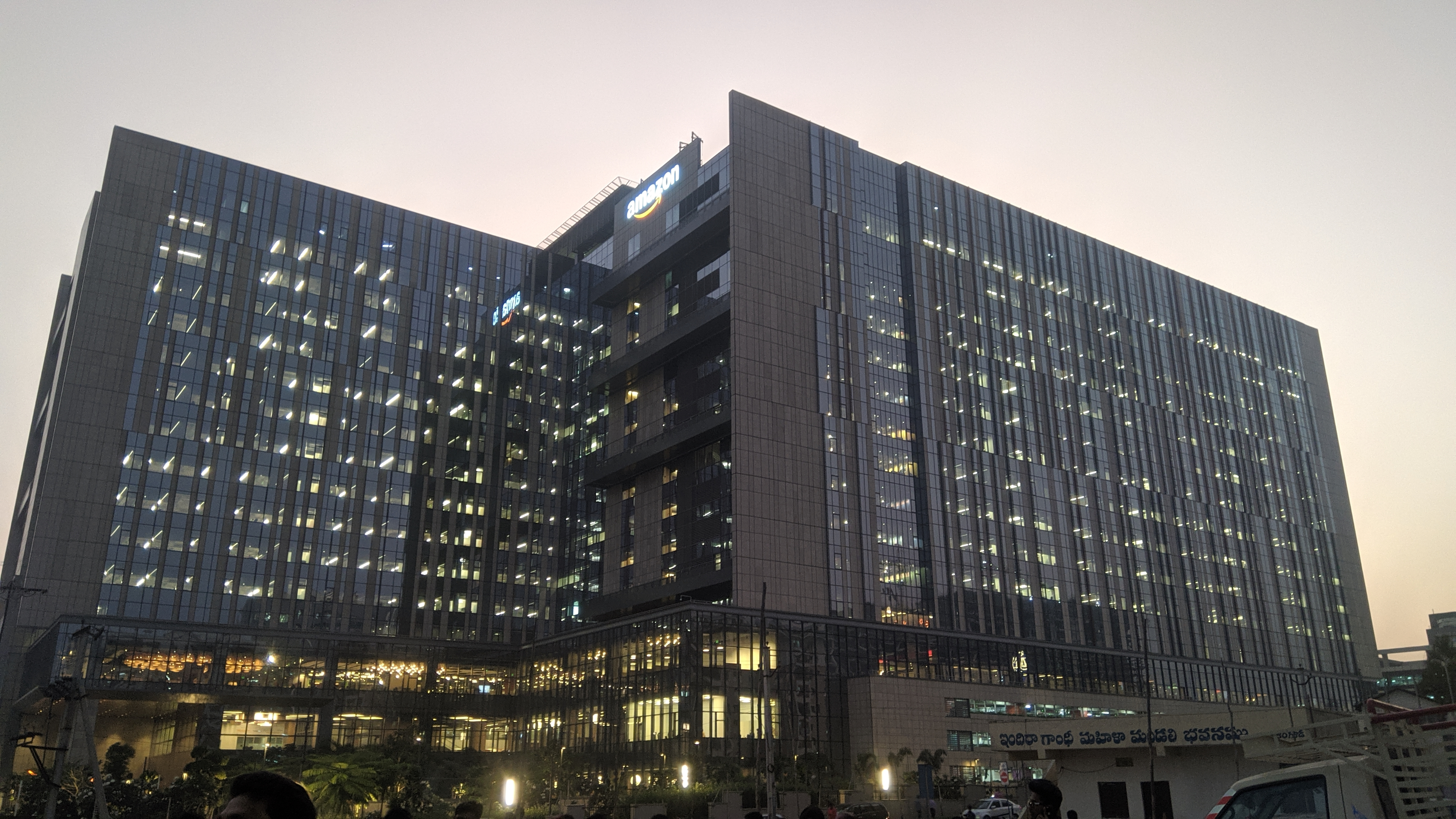
Amazon Hyderabad campus

Hyderabad – known for the HITEC City or Cyberabad – is India's second largest information technology exporter and a major global IT hub, and the largest bioinformatics hub in India. Hyderabad has emerged as the second largest city in the country for software exports pipping competitors Chennai and Pune.

=== Pune ===
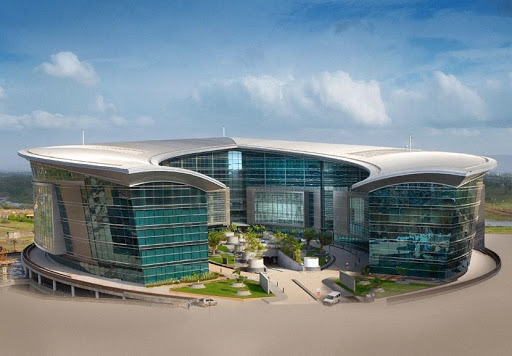
Eon IT Park, Pune

Pune is a major centre for IT services and software development. Companies with large operations in the city include Infosys, TCS, Accenture, Amdocs, Cognizant, IBM, Capgemini and Tech Mahindra. Several global capability centres operate in Pune, including those of financial firms such as UBS, Barclays and BNY. Technology companies founded in the city include Druva, FirstCry and PubMatic.

=== Chennai ===
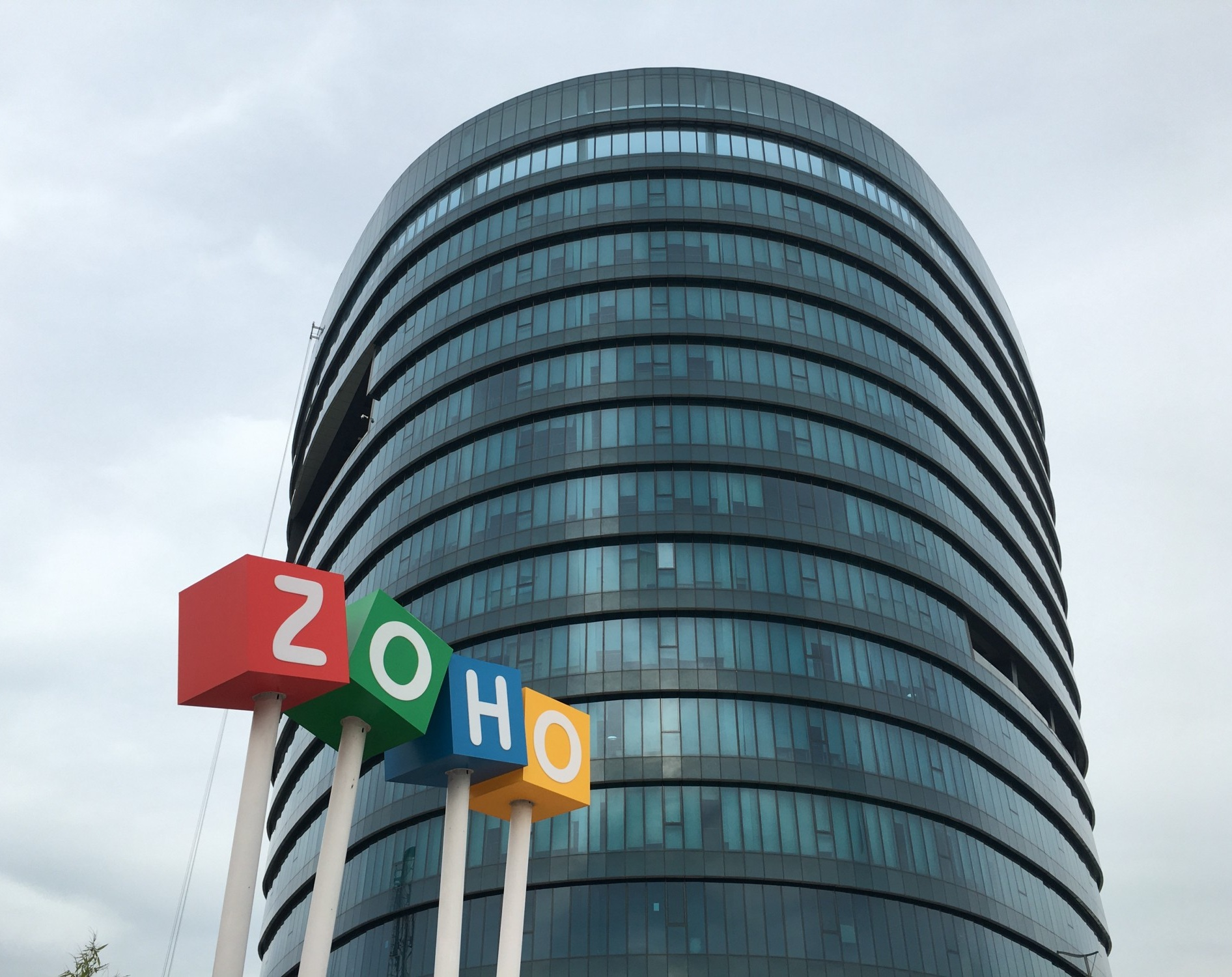
Zoho headquarters in Chennai

As of 2018, Chennai was India's third-largest exporter of information technology (IT) and business process outsourcing (BPO) services, after Bangalore and Hyderabad. TIDEL Park in Chennai was billed as Asia's largest IT park when it was built.

=== Kolkata ===
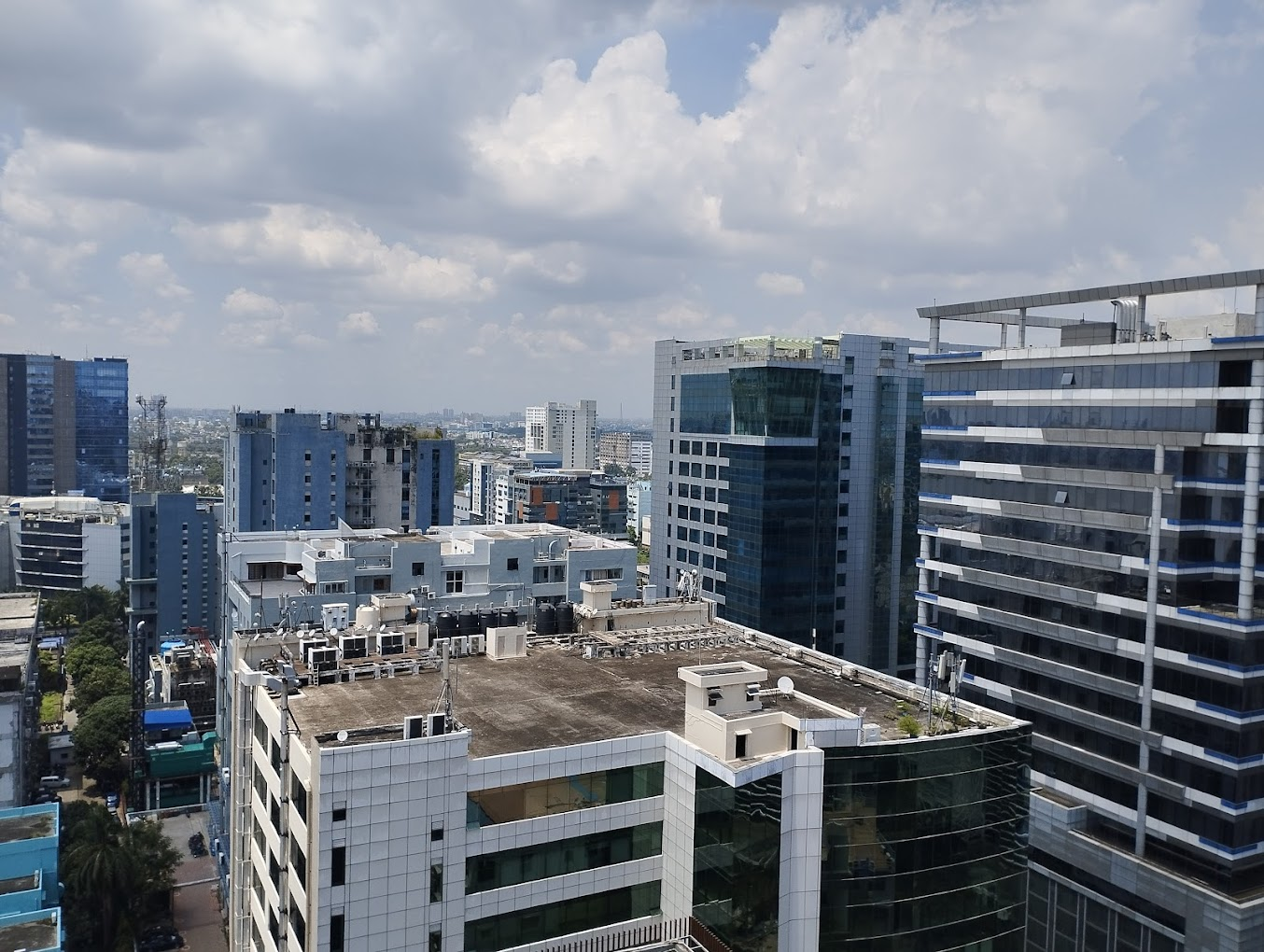
Sector V Salt Lake - the IT hub of Kolkata

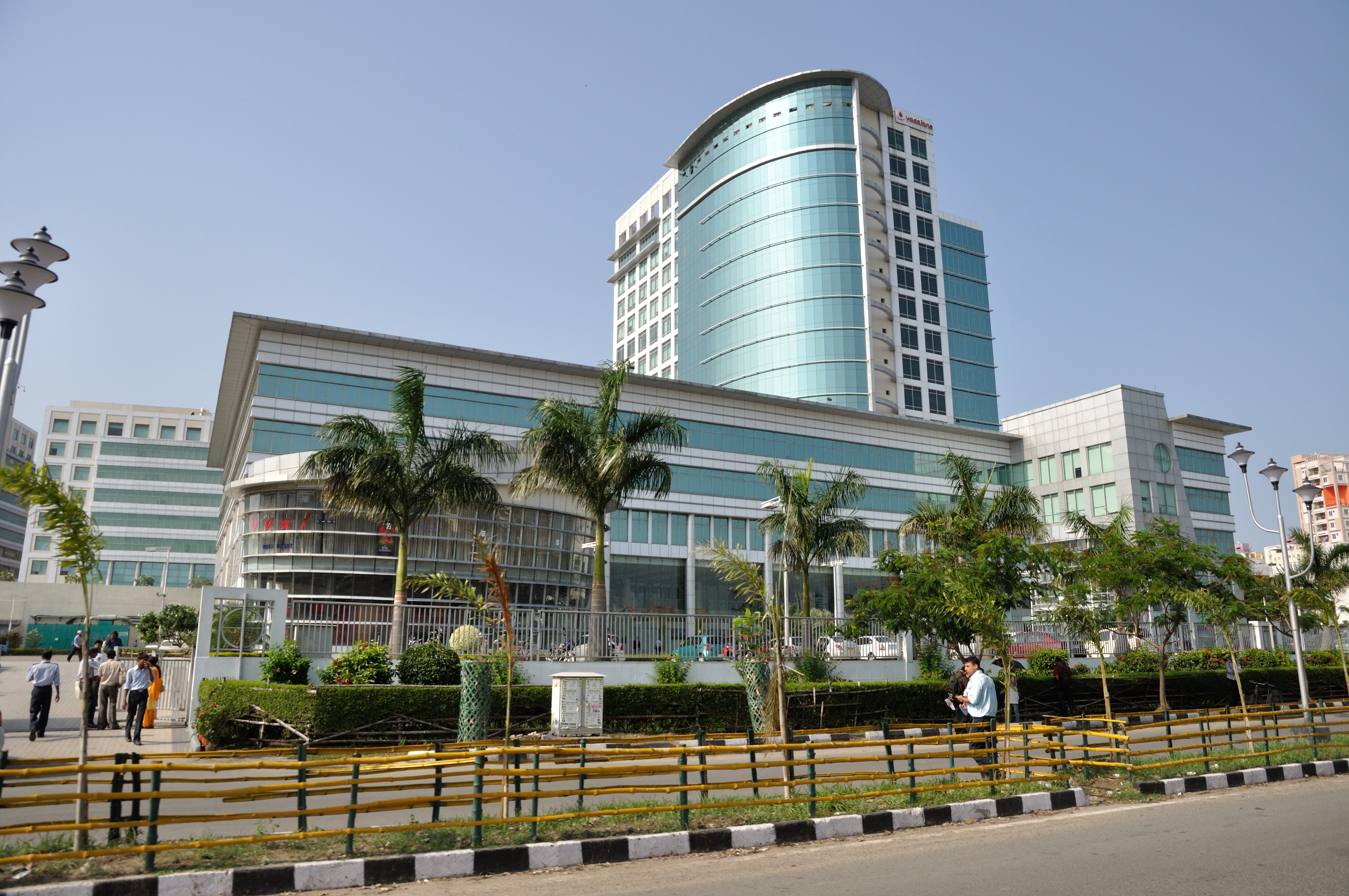
DLF IT Park, New Town

The Kolkata Metropolitan Area is the largest IT hub in East India. Most of the IT parks and offices are located at New Town and Bidhannagar. Salt Lake Electronics Complex in Salt Lake Sector-V is India's first fully integrated Electronics Complex. As of 2020, the city's IT sector employed more than 200,000 people directly. Total export from IT sector was estimated at ₹25,918 crore in 2021–22. In 2022, Kolkata generated 20,000 direct jobs in just 6 months, which is an all-time high for IT industry in East India.

== Controversies ==
=== Recruitment fraud ===
Some job seekers have used forged experience certificates to gain entry into the Indian IT industry. These fake documents are provided by consultancies that are mainly operating out of Chennai, Hyderabad and Noida. IT professionals frequently use proxy interviews to clear interviews, but the majority of the phoney candidates are rejected during the interview round.

In response, IT companies have tightened background checks on candidates, including through third-party verification firms.

=== Tech support scams ===
A 2017 study of technical support scams published at the NDSS Symposium found that, of the tech support scams in which the IPs involved could be geolocated, 85% could be traced to locations in India. Fraudulent call centres in India have targeted victims in the United States and Europe. Kolkata, Bangalore, Hyderabad, and Mumbai are the main operating locations for these fraud call centres.

Law enforcement agencies in India, including the Central Bureau of Investigation, have raided such call centres, in some cases working with the FBI and other foreign agencies.

== See also ==
- List of Indian IT companies
- List of special economic zones in India
- Business process outsourcing to India
- Free Software Movement of India
- Software Technology Parks of India
- List of publicly listed software companies of India
- Supercomputing in India
- Data centre industry in India
- Technological unemployment
