= Lakhumal Hiranand Hiranandani =

Indian otorhinolaryngologist, social activist and philanthropist

- Born: September 1917; Thatta, Bombay Presidency, British India
- Died: 5 September 2013 (aged 95–96); Mumbai, Maharashtra, India
- Other name: Lakhumal Hiranand Khiara
- Occupation: Otorhinolaryngologist
- Years active: 1947–2013
- Known for: Otorhinolaryngology; Social activism Philanthropy
- Spouse: Kanta
- Children: Navin Hiranandani; Niranjan Hiranandani; Surendra Hiranandani
- Awards: Padma Bhushan; Dhanvanthari Award; AAO-HNS Golden Award; SAARC Millenium Award; FICCI Lifetime Achievement Award in Healthcare

Lakhumal Hiranand Hiranandani (1917–2013) was an Indian otorhinolaryngologist, social activist and philanthropist, known for pioneering several surgical procedures which later came to be known as Dr. Hiranandani's Operations. He was the founder chairman of Hiranandani Foundation Trust which runs two schools in India and was reported to have been active in the social movement against organ trade in India. He was a recipient of the Golden Award of the American Academy of Otolaryngology–Head and Neck Surgery, the first Indian and the fifth overall to receive the honour. The Government of India awarded him the third highest civilian honour of the Padma Bhushan, in 1972, for his contributions to medicine and society.

== Biography ==
Lakhumal Hiranand Hiranandani, born as Lakhumal Hiranand Khiara, was born in September 1917, in Thatta, the Sindh province of British India (presently in Pakistan) in a family of limited financial means. After his early education in Sindh, he accompanied his family which migrated to Mumbai in 1937, and graduated in medicine in 1942 from Topiwala National Medical College, Mumbai. After doing his internship at the King Edward Memorial Hospital and Seth Gordhandas Sunderdas Medical College, he moved to London for further studies from where he secured the degree of FRCS and returned to India to start his career by joining his alma mater, Topiwala National Medical College and Bai Yamunabai Laxman Nair Charitable Hospital, as an honorary ENT surgeon. He served the institution till his superannuation at the age of 58 after which, associated himself with Greater Mumbai Municipal Corporation when they made him an Emeritus Professor and Advisor to the Department of Otolaryngology and Head and Neck. He also worked as a consultant at Breach Candy Hospital and Jaslok Hospital and continued his association with the Topiwala National Medical College as an Emeritus Professor, till the age of 83.

Hiranandani was married to Kanta and the couple had three sons, Navin Hiranandani, an ENT surgeon and a known medical writer, Niranjan Hiranandani and Surendra Hiranandani, both entrepreneurs and the founders of Hiranandani Group, one of the leading real estate developers with a number of notable developments such as Hiranandani Gardens and Hiranandani Estate.

He died on 5 September 2013, succumbing to age-related illnesses at the age of 96, survived by his wife and the two younger sons; Navin Hiranandani having preceded him in death. The story of his life has been documented in the book, Dr. L H Hiranandani - Born To Heal, written by Subhadra Anand.

== Legacy ==
Hiranandani was credited with several achievements in interventional medical treatment and medical administration. He pioneered many new surgical methods in otorhynolaryngology, which collectively came to be known as Dr Hiranandani's Operations. He initiated a treatment protocol for throat cancer, an initiative which was considered outside the purview of an ENT surgeon till then, which, reportedly, integrated head and neck surgeries with ENT. At BYL Nair Charitable Hospital, he established an ENT department incorporating head and neck surgeries, reported to be the first time in India an ENT department included head and neck surgical treatment also in its treatment range. The department was later named as Dr. Hiranandani's Department of Otolaryngology and Head & Neck. He also established the Post Graduate ENT Hospital, Speech and Audiology School and Vestibular Research Unit at BYL Hospital. He served as a member of the Advisory Committee of the Government of India for setting up medical colleges in the private sector and it was during his tenure at the committee that 14 medical colleges were established in Maharashtra and the retirement age of the medical academics of the state was raised from 58 to 65.

Hiranandani was a member of the American Society of Head and Neck Surgery, the first Indian to be accorded a membership at AHNS. He was the author of several articles and two books, Histopathological Study of Middle Ear Cleft and its Clinical Applications and Head and Neck Cancer. He was one among the group of ENT surgeons who founded the Association of Otolaryngologists of India (AOI) and served as its president during which time AOI opened the AOI Research and Education Foundation. He was instrumental in the creation of 15 research endowments spread across several Indian universities, each valued at ₹100,000 each and personally contributed ₹300,000 towards the corpus fund for the endowments. His efforts were also reported in the establishment of 20 orations and many awards and prizes for recognising excellence in otorhynolaryngology. Besides, he served as an adviser of the Union Public Service Commission and Maharashtra Public Service Commission. After being nominated as the nominee of the Maharashtra state government at the Medical Council of India, he served as the member of its National Board and a member of the executive council from 1990 to 1995. He was also a member of the governing council of the Indian Council of Medical Research (ICMR).

In 1972, when a drought hit Mumbai, Hiranandani abandoned his medical practice to organise medical aid and immunisation camps for the drought-affected people, serving as the Honorary Medical Director. The next year, he worked in Bihar and Odisha which were affected by floods and in the aftermath of the Bombay riots of 1993, he worked for organising medical aid to the injured. He founded Hiranandani Foundation Trust, and opened the first school under the trust, Hiranandani Foundation School, Powai in 1990, followed by another one at Thane, HFS International, in 1999. It is reported that he bequeathed his savings of ₹25 million to the foundation. He also served as a member of the executive committee of the University of Mumbai, when he was appointed to the post in 1991. It was in the 1990s, he led a campaign against organ trade which was known to have assisted in the passing of The Transplantation of Human Organs Act, 1994 which proposed guidelines on organ donation and imposed strict restrictions on organ trade.

== Awards and honours ==
Hiranandani was a member of the American Society of Head and Neck Surgery, the first Indian to be inducted into the society. When he was selected for the Golden Award of the American Academy of Otolaryngology–Head and Neck Surgery, he became the first Indian and the fifth person to receive the award.

The Government of India included him the Republic Day Honours list for the third highest civilian honour of the Padma Bhushan in 1972.

He received the Danvanthari Award of the Dhanvantari Medical Foundation in 1988, the first time the award was given to an ENT surgeon.

He was also a recipient of the SAARC Millenium Award, which he received in 2001.

A year before his death, he received the Lifetime Achievement Award in Healthcare from the Federation of Indian Chambers of Commerce and Industry (FICCI) in 2012.

Apart from Dr. Hiranandani's Department of Otolaryngology and Head & Neck at the BYL Nair Charitable Hospital, another institution, Dr. L. H. Hiranandani College of Pharmacy, an institution located in Ulhasnagar, Mumbai, is also named after Hirnanadani.

Dr L H Hiranandani Hospital is a 240-bedded multi-specialty hospital built by his sons, in honour of their father.
