= Data centre industry in India =

India has a growing data centre industry. Data centres are used for national security, internet infrastructure, and economic output. As of 2026, India's data centre capacity is at 1.5 GW. The data centre industry is valued at US$1.2 billion in 2021. The number of data centres in India currently stands at 348. India ranks 6th globally in terms of number of data centres.

As of 2021, Indian data centres occupy over 8 million sq ft area. 60% of total data centres are in Navi Mumbai, Chennai, Noida, Gurgaon, Bangalore and Hyderabad.

TIER - IV Data Centre by Tata Communications at GIFT City

== Industry statistics ==
Data centres in India are used for information technology, submarine cable connectivity, economic output, personal data protection legislation and investment incentives etc. As per JLL, Indian data centre industry is expected to add more 681 MW capacity by the end of 2024 leading to a doubling of existing capacity to 1,318 MW with 7.8 million sq ft of real estate space. Mumbai is expected to account for 57 percent of the new supply, followed by Chennai at 25 percent. The 5G rollout also has enhanced the need of data centre capacity, since it will increase data download speeds in India 10 times. Also Over-the-top media services in India, video streaming, online gaming, augmented reality and digital commerce are major factors of the developing industry.

== Major data centre hubs ==
=== Navi Mumbai ===
Navi Mumbai holds the largest data centre market with 44% of the market share alone. The total capacity is 289 MW, with 3.6 million sq ft in its functional area. In 2020, REIT Equinix signed a deal to invest $161 million to facilitate a 19 MW local operations of GPX. Sify Technologies Limited, Yotta Data Services Private Limited, CapitaLand, AdaniConneX venture have their major data centre projects in Navi Mumbai.

Google has planned to set up an 8-storey 381,000 sq ft data centre in Navi Mumbai by 2025 with an investment of ₹1144 crore in first 10 years. In addition, Microsoft has plans to build a data centre in Mumbai. CtrlS Datacenters Ltd, which had eight data centres (as of 2023) aims to have about 25 data centres by 2024–25 in India. It plans to expand 5 million sq ft after its existing 1.2 million sq ft, in which a 2 million sq ft hyperscale data centre is under construction in Navi Mumbai. Ctrl-S is to establish 4 big data centers in Airoli, MIDC Industrial area.

Navi Mumbai has emerged as the third-biggest data centre market in the Asia-Pacific region, with a total capacity at 2,337 MW and breaching the 2GW mark, in 2023, behind Shanghai and Tokyo.

=== Hyderabad ===
Due to its IT presence, Hyderabad consists 6% of the market share in the data centre industry, with a capacity of 38 MW and 0.71 million sq ft area. Sify, STT, CapitaLand, and CtrlS are key players in the city.

=== Bangalore ===
Bangalore, known as the Silicon Valley of India, has a major data centre presence due to its large IT infrastructure. As of 2020 Bangalore has a total capacity of 162 MW having 1.74 Million sq ft used for data centre. It possesses a 25% of the market share. Sify, ESDS, Sungard, Whitefield Nxtra Data, CapitaLand, Evoque, STT, NTT etc. have their data centres here.

=== Noida (Delhi-NCR) ===
Noida, which falls under the Delhi-NCR has a significant data centre industry. It is the only data centre hub in North India. Delhi has a capacity of 72 MW and a total of 1.05 million sq ft with 11% market share. Google has acquired a 464,000 sq ft facility at Adani Centre in Noida in 2022.

=== Pune ===
Having IT industry in its main economy, Pune's data centres have a total capacity of 32 MW and 0.44 million sq ft with a 5% market share. National companies like Nxtra, STT, Web Werks and Microsoft Azure have set up their campuses in Pune.

=== Chennai ===
Chennai has a major presence of data centre since it has the market with the second-highest number of undersea cables after Mumbai. Total capacity is 57 MW with 8% market share and a total of 0.92 million sq ft. Chennai is projected to overtake other markets to become the second-largest up to 2030. Sify, Yotta, CtrlS, Princeton Digital, CapitaLand, STT, and NxtGen have more than one campus adding to local capacity. The Adani enterprises has signed an MoU with the Tamil Nadu government to set up a data centre in Chennai, with an investment of Rs 2,500 crore.

=== Kolkata ===
Kolkata is the only data centre hub in the East India and second biggest in Indian subcontinent region with a total capacity of 67 MW and 1.2 million sq ft with a significant market share. Major players are NTT (40MW), Sify and STT. STT has a data centre of 34 MW.

Multiple data centre projects are under construction. As of 2021, Kolkata comes second in terms of land earmarked for data centres, with 195 acres in its foray. Reliance Jio has acquired a 40-acre plot for a data centre. The Adani Enterprise has taken a 51.8 acre plot in the Silicon Valley Hub, New Town to build a hyperscale data centre with ₹10,000 crore investment. Also Bharti Airtel Nxtra Data, has acquired plot to build a hyper-scale data centre of 25 MW (150,000 sq ft) in Kolkata with an investment of ₹600 crore, which is under construction as of 2022. Hiranandani Group is also planning six data centres at Hind Motor, Uttarpara, West Bengal. The group acquired a 100-acre plot at Uttarpara, Hooghly, to set up six data centres (total 250 MW) with an investment of 8,500 crore.

== State and union territory policies ==
Several Indian states have notified dedicated data centre policies to attract investment through capital subsidies, power and land concessions, and stamp duty exemptions.

Dedicated state data centre policies
State	Policy	Notified	Key incentives
Telangana	Telangana Data Centres Policy	2016	25% subsidy on lease rentals for 3 years; R&D and patent-filing cost reimbursement; power at cost of generation
Tamil Nadu	Tamil Nadu Data Centre Policy 2021	26 November 2021	100% subsidy on electricity tax for 5 years; up to 100% stamp duty exemption; land cost subsidy in category C regions
West Bengal	West Bengal Data Centre Policy 2021	6 September 2021	100% exemption on stamp duty and registration fees; 5-year electricity duty waiver
Odisha	Odisha Data Centre Policy 2022	2022	Single-window clearance; 15% reimbursement (up to Rs 25 lakh) on solar power plant costs
Karnataka	Karnataka Data Centre Policy 2022–2027	20 April 2022	Capital subsidy up to ₹10 crore (US$1.1 million) outside Bengaluru; 10% land subsidy up to ₹3 crore (US$320,000); 100% stamp duty exemption on up to 10 acres
Haryana	Haryana State Data Centre Policy 2022	27 June 2022	100% electricity duty exemption for 20 years; SGST and stamp duty reimbursement; valid 7 years
Uttar Pradesh	Uttar Pradesh Data Centre Policy (2021, replaced 2026)	January 2021; revised 6 July 2026	2026 revision targets over 2 GW of additional capacity and ₹2 lakh crore (US$21 billion) investment; capital and interest subsidies, AI Compute Booster incentive
Andhra Pradesh	Andhra Pradesh Data Center Policy 4.0 (2024–29)	4 December 2024	100% SGST reimbursement on capital goods or 10% capital subsidy on plant and machinery; 20-year transmission and electricity duty exemptions for qualifying projects
Rajasthan	Rajasthan Data Centre Policy 2025	25 August 2025	Annual asset-creation incentive of ₹10 crore (US$1.1 million)–₹20 crore (US$2.1 million) for 10 years; 5% interest subsidy for 5 years; 100% waiver on banking, transmission and wheeling charges
Gujarat	Gujarat Data Centre Policy 2026–2029	9 July 2026 (notified 7 August 2026)	Targets ₹6 lakh crore (US$64 billion) investment and 7.5 GW capacity; described by the state as India's first dedicated hyperscale data centre policy

Maharashtra has not issued a standalone data centre policy; incentives for data centres were instead added to its Information Technology and Information Technology Support Services Policy 2023 via an October 2024 cabinet decision approving "Green Integrated Data Centre Parks", targeting ₹1.6 lakh crore (US$17 billion) in investment across parks of at least 500 MW each.

== See also ==
- Information technology in India
