= Niranjan Hiranandani =

Indian businessman (born 1950)

- Born: 8 March 1950 (age 76); Mumbai, Maharashtra, India
- Education: Chartered accountant
- Alma mater: Campion School, Mumbai; Sydenham College
- Occupation: Real estate developer
- Known for: Co-founder and MD, Hiranandani Group
- Spouse: Kamal Hiranandani
- Children: 2
- Parent: Lakhumal Hiranand Hiranandani
- Relatives: Surendra Hiranandani (brother)

Niranjan Hiranandani (born 8 March 1950) is an Indian billionaire businessman, the co-founder and managing director of Hiranandani Group, engaged in real estate business. He is ranked by Forbes among the 100 richest Indians, with a net worth of US$1.6 billion as of June 2021.

In 2020, he was in the Top 10 Indian real estate tycoons according to the Grohe Hurun report. In 2020, he was the second richest person in the Real estate Sector as per the IIFL Wealth Hurun India Rich List (2020). Along with members of his family, Hiranandani controls the privately owned Hiranandani Group.

== Early life and education ==
Hiranandani was born in Mumbai. His father was Lakhumal Hiranand Hiranandani, an ENT surgeon and a recipient of the Government of India's Padma Bhushan award. Hiranandani's elder brother is named Navin, and his younger brother is Surendra. Hiranandani finished schooling from Campion School, Mumbai and has a bachelor's degree in commerce from Sydenham College in Mumbai. He is a chartered accountant of the Institute of Chartered Accountants of India.

== Career ==
Hiranandani started his career as an accounting teacher. In 1981 he started his first business, a textile weaving unit in Kandivali, Mumbai.

Along with his brother Surendra, he bought 250 acres land in Powai, Mumbai in 1985 and started a real estate business under the name Hiranandani Gardens. Hiranandani Constructions is working on revamping and launching two townships that the developer acquired through a court auction for nearly ₹1,000 crore. Hiranandani Estate is a township built in Thane, a part of the Mumbai Metropolitan Region in Maharashtra. Hiranandani Hospital was started in Powai in 2006 and Thane in 2011.

He is the Founder Chairman of Yotta Infrastructure and have launched the world's second largest data center, NM1 in its Integrated Yotta Data Center Park at Navi Mumbai.

== Associations ==
Hiranandani is on board of 17 schools, including the Hiranandani Foundation School in Powai and Thane.

Hiranandani is the past president of the Maharashtra Chambers of Housing Industry; Chairman of Mumbai City, Development and Environment Committee of the Indian Merchants Chambers (I.M.C.) Mumbai,

He is also the President of an association by the name of National Real Estate Development Council (NAREDCO). formed under the aegis of the Government of India, Ministry of Housing and Urban Affairs, for promoting transparency and ethics in the real estate business and for transforming the unorganized Indian real estate sector into a globally competitive business sector.

He is the past President of a 100 year old trade association of India the "Associated Chambers of Commerce and Industry of India" ASSOCHAM. Established for shaping the Trade Commerce and Industrial Environment of the Country. ASSOCHAM is a member of International Chamber of Commerce.

Member of the task force of the Government of India for reforms in housing and urban development and Member of the study group Slum Rehabilitation Scheme, Government of Maharashtra.

Hiranandani was the adviser to the Government of India on housing and habitat policy and real estate president of the Federation of Indian Chambers of Commerce and Industry (FICCI).

Hiranandani is the chairperson on the Priyadarshni Academy which facilitates for social and cultural work.

He is on Board of Trustees – Nathdwara Temple Board, Nathdwara (Rajasthan), Babulnath temple, Jhulelal temple.

He is the President of the Hyderabad (Sind) National Collegiate Board, which manages 22 educational institutions including secondary and higher secondary schools, polytechnics, and degree and post-graduate colleges.

He is also the former Chairman of Advisory Council of Confederation of Real Estate Developers’ Association of India (CREDAI).

He is also a part of the Board of Advisors of IIMUN.

He also played an instrumental role in the formation of the newly formed cluster university called HSNC University, Mumbai. This varsity, although is State-owned but will be operated & administered by the H(S)NC Board, one of Indian's oldest educational trusts of which he has previously served as president. He will be affiliated with the same in the future as well, while working in the capacity of the institute's "Provost". This cluster university will also include prestigious Institutions such as K.C. College and H.R. College.

== Controversies ==
In October 2021, Hiranandani was named in the Pandora Papers. He is alleged to have hidden $60 million in several offshore trusts. Hiranandani claimed that the money stored in the offshore account in the British Virgin Islands belongs to his son Darshan Hiranandani who stays in Dubai.

== Personal life ==
Niranjan is married to Kamal Hiranandani and has two children: a daughter, Priya, and a son, Darshan. Priya is married to Cyrus Vandrevala, a London-based businessman. Darshan is married to Neha Makhija, daughter of Ahmedabad-based businessman Ashok Makhija and his wife Muskan Makhija.

== See also ==
- HSNC University, Mumbai
- Dr. L. H. Hiranandani College of Hospital
