= Druva =

Software company

Druva Inc.
- Type: Private
- Industry: Cloud computing; Backup
- Founded: 2008 in Pune, India
- Founders: Jaspreet Singh, Milind Borate, Ramani Kothandaraman
- Headquarters: Santa Clara, California, United States
- Key people: Jaspreet Singh (CEO); Milind Borate (CTO)
- Products: Druva Phoenix; Druva inSync; Druva CloudRanger
- Revenue: ▲$100.2 Million(2019)
- Number of employees: 1,000+ (2022)
- Website: www.druva.com

Druva Inc. is an American privately held software company. The company provides SaaS-based data protection and management products.

== History ==
In 2008, Jaspreet Singh (CEO), Milind Borate (CTO), and Ramani Kothandaraman, who met while working at Veritas Software, founded Druva in Pune, India.

The company's name is derived from Sanskrit word, "Dhruva" which translates to "Pole Star". Initially, Druva focused on providing data management software to financial companies before shifting to general enterprise data management.

In 2010, the company received Series A funding. In 2011, the company added smartphone support for its Insync app and received Series B funding. The next year, the company moved its headquarters to Silicon Valley, and again shifted focus to cloud-based data management and protection. By 2013 Dhruva raised Series C funding.

In 2014, Druva released its Phoenix server backup product and received Series D funding. By 2016, the company set up a subsidiary in Japan and an office in Tokyo. Druva received FedRAMP authority to operate in 2017. In 2019, Druva opened an office in Singapore. The company also received additional late-stage funding, which brought its total amount invested to $328 million and its total valuation to more than $1 billion.

In 2018, Druva acquired Letterkenny-based CloudRanger, a backup and disaster recovery company. In 2019, Druva acquired CloudLanes to supplement its on-premises to cloud performance. The following year it acquired sfApex, a Texas based backup and migration company focused on Salesforce data. In April 2021, Druva raised $147 million in its eighth funding round, valuing the company at about $2 billion.
