= Vandrevala Foundation =

Mental health organization

Cyrus and Priya Vandrevala Foundation
- The logo of Vandrevala Foundation
- Established: 2008
- Founder: Cyrus Vandrevala; Priya Hiranandani-Vandrevala
- Type: Non-profit
- Region served: India
- Method: Telephone counseling, WhatsApp
- Website: Official website

Vandrevala Foundation is an NGO established by Cyrus Vandrevala and Priya Vandrevala in 2008. In 2009, the foundation launched the "Mental Health - India" initiative to raise awareness and provide services for emotionally distressed individuals.

The organization operates several crisis helplines in major cities across India in collaboration with the Emmanuel Hospital Association, St Stephen's Hospital, Delhi, and the Mar Thoma Church. Its efforts have been noted by the media.

== History ==
Vandrevala Foundation was founded in 2008 by a billionaire couple, Priya Hiranandani-Vandrevala and Cyrus Vandrevala, who hail from Mumbai, India, and are presently based in London, United Kingdom. It launched the 'Mental Health - India' initiative in 2009, with the aim of raising awareness about mental health issues and providing support services for individuals experiencing emotional distress.

In October 2011, the foundation launched a 24-hour psychiatric helpline in Delhi, which was inaugurated by then-Chief Minister Sheila Dixit. On World Suicide Prevention Day in September 2013, the Vandrevala Foundation and the Suraksha Setu Society of the Gujarat Police launched a 24x7 mental health helpline for residents of Gujarat.

In 2014, the foundation submitted a plan to the Government of Maharashtra to improve services in mental health institutions in the state, in response to a published report by the World Health Organization (WHO) which ranked India as having the highest number of suicides in the world. The foundation has entered into an agreement with the Directorate General of Shipping in India to serve as the official mental health helpline for Indian sailors and their families around the globe.

In November 2014, the Vandrevala Foundation was featured on an episode of the Indian talk show Satyamev Jayate, which focused on Nurturing Mental Health and was hosted by Aamir Khan. The foundation's collaboration with Aamir Khan helped to raise awareness and reduce the stigma surrounding mental health illnesses.

One of the objectives of the initiative is to prevent possible attempts of suicide by providing advice and assistance in English, Hindi, and all major Indian regional languages. As of January 2023, the foundation has handled 1.7 million cases.

In May 2021, the Surat City Police, in collaboration with the Vandrevala Foundation and Veer Narmad South Gujarat University (VNSGU), launched a counseling program for individuals who had been rescued from attempting suicide. The program was aimed at providing psychological aid to those affected. In June 2021, Vadodara City Police partnered with the Vandrevala Foundation and the Psychology Department of Maharaja Sayajirao University of Baroda to launch Vadodara City's first toll-free helpline number called Zindagi Helpline to help people who are experiencing mental distress or suicidal thoughts.

== Operations ==
Vandrevala Foundation operates its helpline virtually on a PAN India level, with counselors based in every state and equipped to handle cases in regional languages. The foundation offers counseling services through voice calls and WhatsApp as its mode of communication.

== Research and survey ==
As per the foundation's report in 2014, India had 43 mental health hospitals and all being established before 1947 and many of them are in a state of disrepair and are unsuitable for individuals seeking guidance and treatment for mental illness.

In March 2023, Vandrevala Foundation published the results of a survey that revealed one-third of individuals who contacted their mental health helpline in the past 18 months reported experiencing anxiety, depression, and suicidal thoughts. The conversations touching on these issues increased to nearly 40 percent in the past three months (November 2022 to January 2023). The foundation facilitated over 1.7 million messages and 1,14,396 conversations with 61,258 individuals from August 2021 till January 2023. The data showed that 81 percent of those seeking counseling came from 12 Indian states, with Maharashtra having the highest number (17.3 percent).

The survey found that the preferred mode of communication differed with age and gender. While younger people preferred WhatsApp, telephonic conversations were preferred by those over 35 years of age. The survey also found that WhatsApp has provided a means of communication for a previously untapped demographic that may have refrained from seeking mental health support in person. Almost 53 percent of women preferred to contact the helpline using WhatsApp chat, whereas 42 percent of men preferred to use the chat service.

== Award and recognition ==
In October 2021, Cyrus & Priya Vandrevala Foundation received India Today's Healthgiri Award for Best Mental Health Counseling, presented by Mansukh Mandaviya, the Union Minister for Health & Family Welfare.

The foundation won the 2022 SABERA Award that acknowledges SDG and ESG aligned initiatives in the field of CSR. The award was granted in recognition of the Foundation's Emergency Mental Health Support initiative, which provides urgent assistance to those in need of mental health services.
