= Hiranandani Upscale School =

Coordinates: 12°50′26″N 80°13′55″E

- Old Mahabalipuram Road; Chennai, Tamil Nadu; India

Information
- School type: Private International School
- Established: 2011
- Founder: Surendra Hiranandani
- School board: International Baccalaureate (IB)

Hiranandani Upscale School (HUS) is a private international school located in Chennai, Tamil Nadu, India. Established in 2011 by Surendra Hiranandani, the school is part of House of Hiranandani's Integrated Community on Old Mahabalipuram Road (OMR).

HUS offers the International Baccalaureate (IB) continuum programme, which includes the Early Years Programme (EYP), Primary Years Programme (PYP), Middle Years Programme (MYP), and Diploma Programme (DP). They also have a second language choice of Spanish, French, Hindi, and Tamil.

== Curriculum ==
The curriculum includes International Baccalaureate subjects such as All Levels of Mathematics, Biology, Chemistry, Physics, Computer Science, Environmental Systems and Societies, English Language and Literature, Economics, Business Management, Digital Society, Visual Arts, Global Politics, Psychology, and Computer Science, as well as other subject accommodations (at request), including English as Second Language, and Chinese Language & Literature. Additionally, the school provides students with the opportunity to choose a second language from Spanish, French, Hindi, or Tamil.

== Infrastructure ==
Hiranandani Upscale School (HUS) is on a 3-acre campus within the House of Hiranandani’s integrated township on Old Mahabalipuram Road (OMR) in Chennai.

Classrooms have Epson projectors. The school uses ManageBac as a digital classroom, where digital resources are integrated as multimedia elements, such as videos and interactive quizzes.

HUS has two information and communications technology (ICT) labs, where primary students gain hands-on experience in basic computer functions like Microsoft Paint and Excel. HUS has two libraries, one for the PYP programme and one for the MYP/DP programme, and three laboratories, one for each of the three major sciences, as well as two specialised arts classrooms.

HUS also has a Special Education Needs (SEN) department that offers personalized support to students with diverse learning requirements, although students report that it is minimal, unhelpful, and comment that the staff have degrading views on friends that have special requirements. Additionally, digital platforms are utilized to streamline administrative tasks and improve communication among parents, teachers, and students.

== House System ==
Students are divided into units called "houses," and each student is allocated to one house, named after famous warrior classes. The four houses are Kshatriyas (yellow), Cavaliers (green), Samurais (red, previously orange), and Knights (light blue). These houses compete in sports and other activities to win house points, aiming to get a house trophy in three divisions (EYP, PYP, and MYP/DP). As of 2026, Kshatriyas are the two-time PYP and MYP/DP champions, building a streak to rival the Samurais' previous long winning streak.

== Controversy ==
In 2016, hundreds of parents and several instructors staged a multi-day protest outside the school due to differences with the administration. This led to the school being closed for one week. There were claims that the school's British director had insulted many Indian freedom fighters and did not allow the children to sing the National anthem. In addition, there were claims that the school director harassed teachers and students. The school would also not allow children to bring their own lunches until they got an order from the Madras High Court but parents still claim that the school discriminates against students bringing their own food instead of using the onsite caterer, Sodexo.

In 2017, CBSE disaffiliated the school, and the school slowly switched from IGCSE (Cambridge) and now only offers the IB program.
