= Hiranandani Gardens, Mumbai =

Hiranandani Gardens Hiranandani Zen
- Township
- Hiranandani Gardens
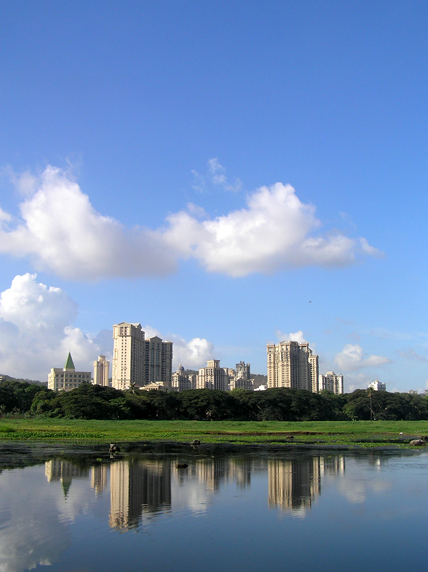
- View of Hiranandani from across Powai Lake

- Location in Mumbai, Maharashtra, India
- Coordinates (Galleria): 19°07′08″N 72°54′42″E
- Country: India
- State: Maharashtra
- District: Mumbai Suburban
- City: Mumbai
- Zone: 5
- Ward: S
- Founded: December 1989
- Founder: Niranjan Hiranandani Surendra Hiranandani Hiranandani Group
- Named for: Real estate developer

Government
  - Type: Municipal Corporation
  - Body: Brihanmumbai Municipal Corporation (MCGM)
  - MP: Poonam Mahajan (BJP)
  - MLA: Dilip Lande (SS)

Area
  - Total: 100 ha (250 acres)

Dimensions
  - Length: 1.4 km (0.87 mi)
  - Width: 1.0 km (0.62 mi)
- Elevation: 52 m (171 ft)

Demography: Multiracial
- Time zone: UTC+05:30 (IST)
- PIN: 400076
- STD code: 022
- Vehicle registration: MH03-XX-XXXX
- Website: hiranandani.com/Hiranandani_Gardens.aspx

Hiranandani Gardens (popularly known simply as Hiranandani) is an upmarket township consisting of condominiums, penthouses, bungalows, and commercial complexes in the Powai neighbourhood of Mumbai. It was constructed by the Hiranandani Group and can be accessed by the Jogeshwari–Vikhroli Link Road (JVLR) from the north and Lal Bahadur Shastri Marg (LBS Marg) from the south.

It consists of residential buildings, office buildings, hospital, schools, gardens, community centre, sports club, banks, shopping malls, film studio, bus garage, hotels, restaurants, pubs, and swimming pools. Spread in an area of 100 hectares (250 acres), the township houses 42 residential buildings and 23 commercial buildings with a building falling under SEZ category (Kensington).

Hiranandani Gardens is also accorded as Mumbai's start-up and outsourcing hub. Hiranandani Gardens houses several startup companies, investment banking firms, venture capital firms, and BPOs.

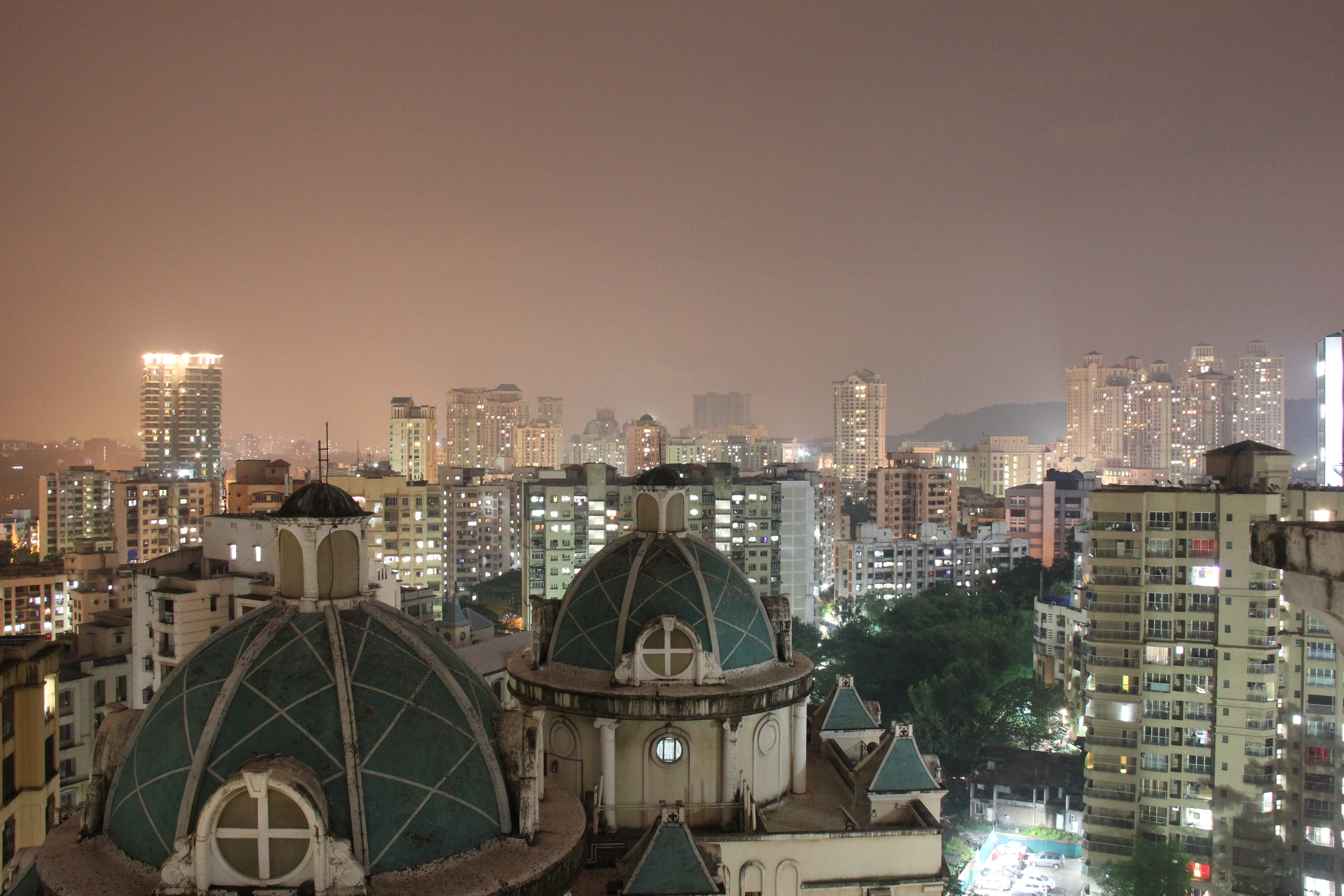
Hiranandani Gardens' skyline in the night

== History ==
In 1986, the Hiranandani group signed a tripartite agreement between the group, the state of Maharashtra, and the MMRDA for developing 93 hectares (230 acres) of land and for constructing affordable housing. The contract was signed at the rate of ₹0.40 (equivalent to ₹6.00 or 6.2¢ US in 2026) per acre or ₹0.99 (equivalent to ₹15 or 15.6¢ US in 2026) per hectare. As per the contract, the real estate developer was to construct apartments measuring 40 m^{2} (430 ft^{2}) and 80 m^{2} (861 ft^{2}) (50% each) as "Medium Income Group Homes" (affordable housing).

Construction started in 1989, when the area was barren and hilly. The area lacked basic infrastructure such as roads, sanitary sewer lines, water or electrical connections. Along with developing the basic infrastructure, more than 100,000 trees were also planted. By the early 1990s the first phase of apartments were ready and were initially sold at the rate of ₹5,400 (equivalent to ₹58,000 or US$600.10 in 2026) per square metre or ₹500 (equivalent to ₹5,400 or US$55.60 in 2026) per square foot.

== Landmarks ==
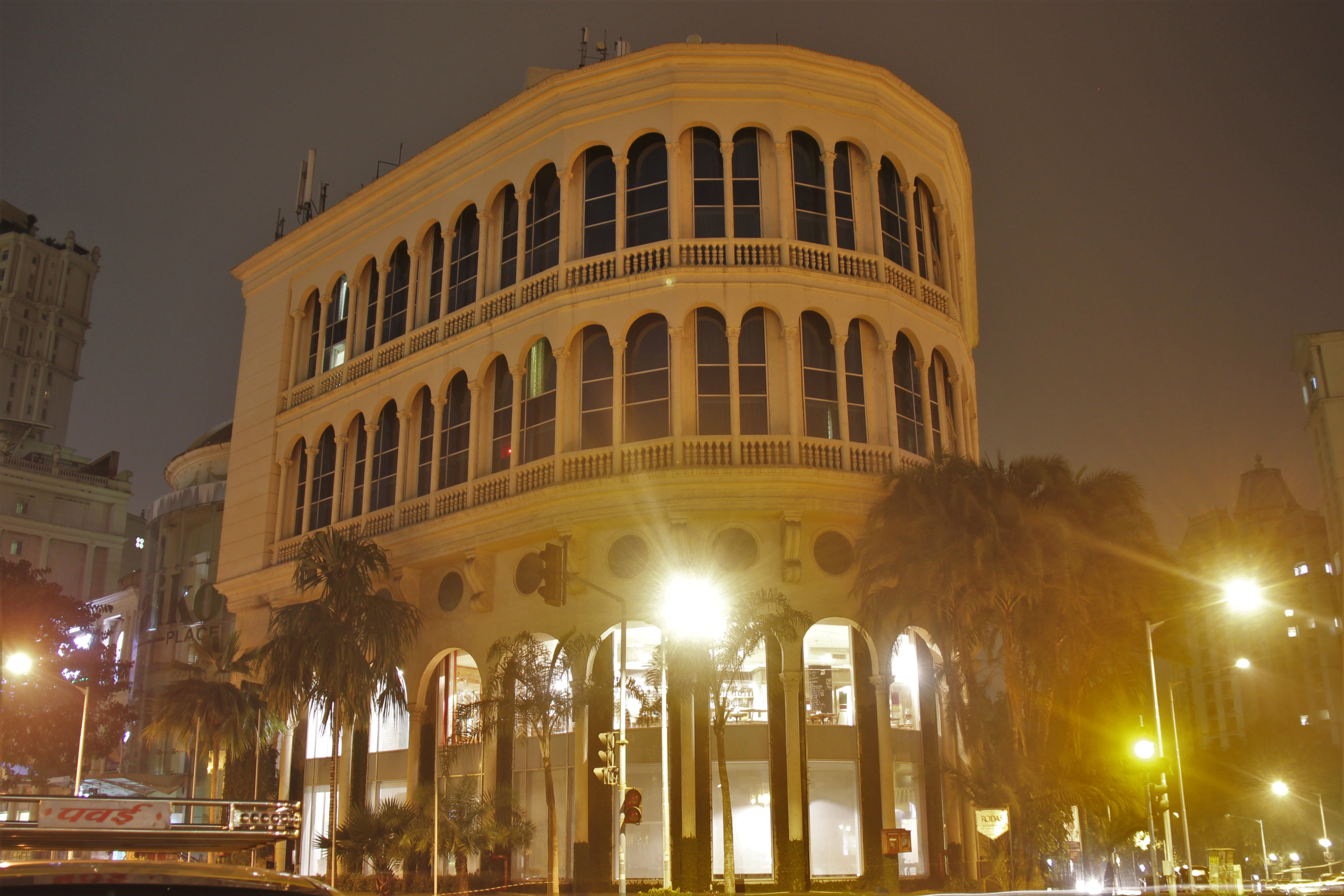
Rodas hotel opposite Galleria

=== Galleria ===
In the 1990s, Hiranandani group constructed Galleria shopping complex in the township. This shopping complex epitomises the Galleria Vittorio Emanuele II in Milan.

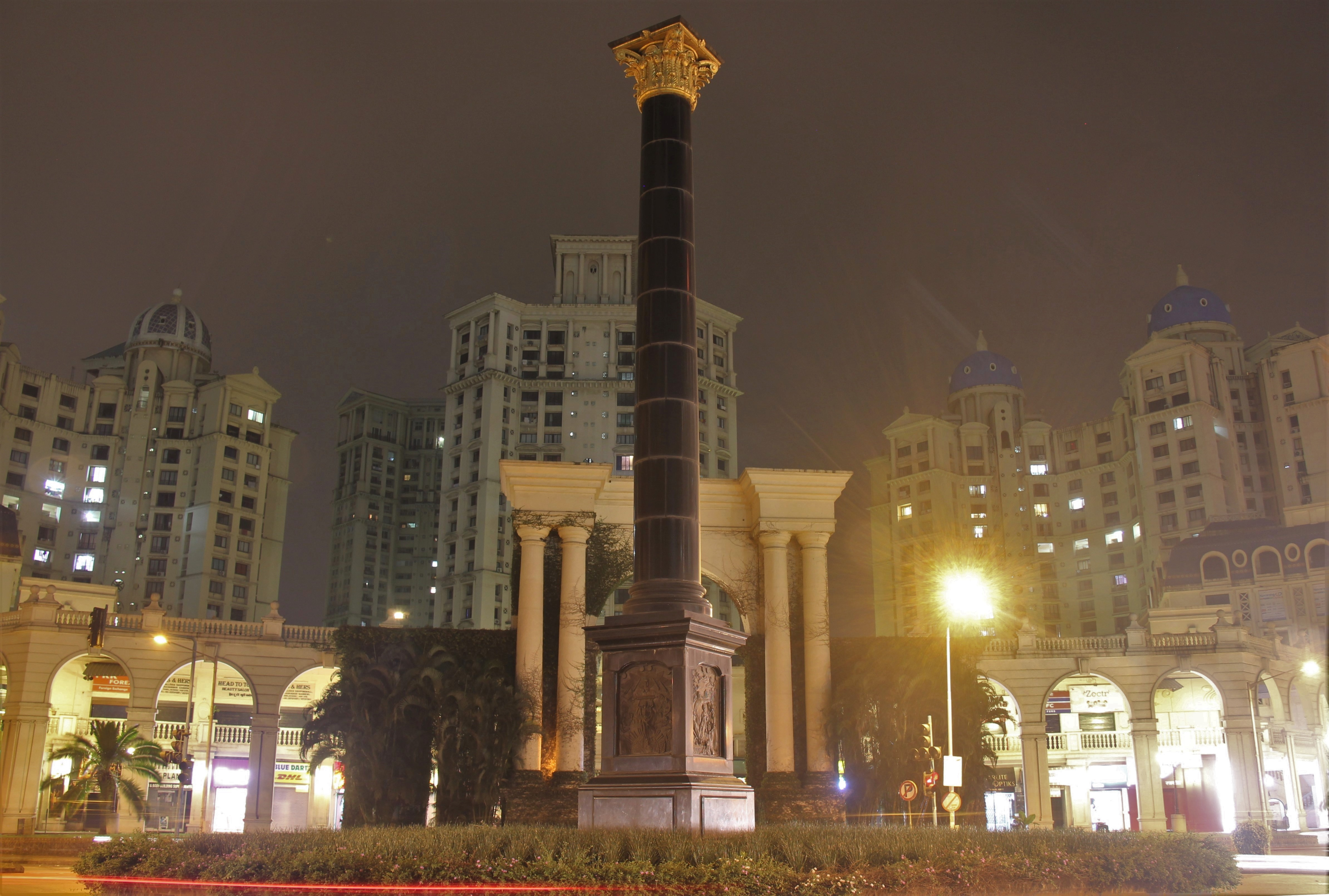
Front view of Galleria shopping complex.

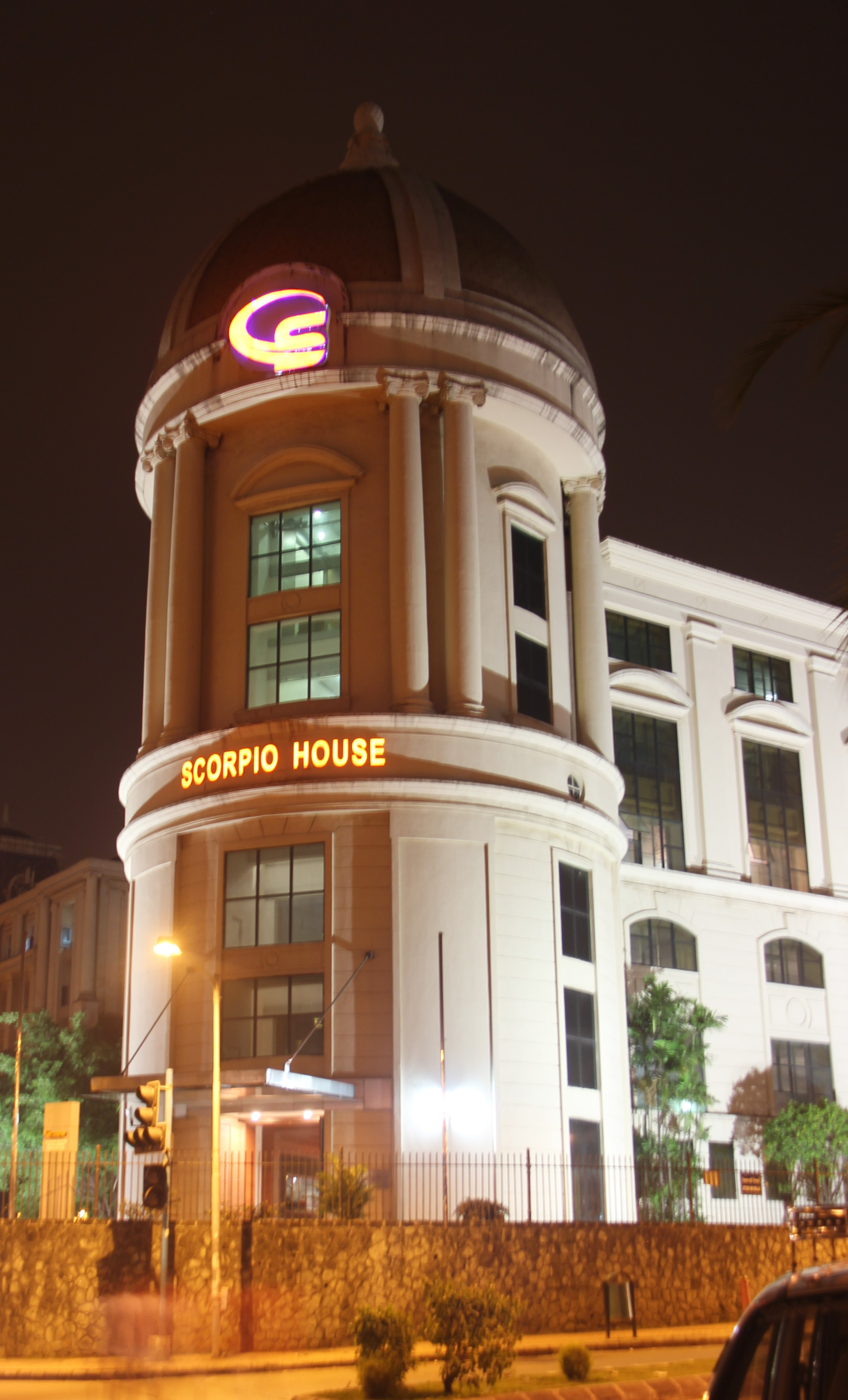
Scorpio House (né Bayer house)

=== Scorpio House ===
Scorpio House is situated opposite Galleria and houses the headquarters of Scorpio Marine Management India Pvt. Ltd. Constructed in 1995, the building is spread over 6,000 square metres (65,000 ft^{2}). This building was earlier called Bayer House and was the headquarter of Bayer India limited from 1995 to 2013. In 1995, Bayer India acquired the building for ₹300 million (equivalent to ₹2.0 billion or US$20.3 million in 2026) (including the cost of land, building and fixtures). Bayer India sought to sell the building in 2002 as well but the sale did not take place due to pricing issues. In 2012, Bayer India acquired 15,300 square metres (165,000 ft^{2}) office space in Hiranandani Estate in Thane and shifted its India HQ to the new location. Scorpio Marine Management acquired the Bayer House for ₹900 million (equivalent to ₹1.7 billion or US$17.3 million in 2026) in 2013 and shifted its India HQ to this building and renamed it "Scorpio House".

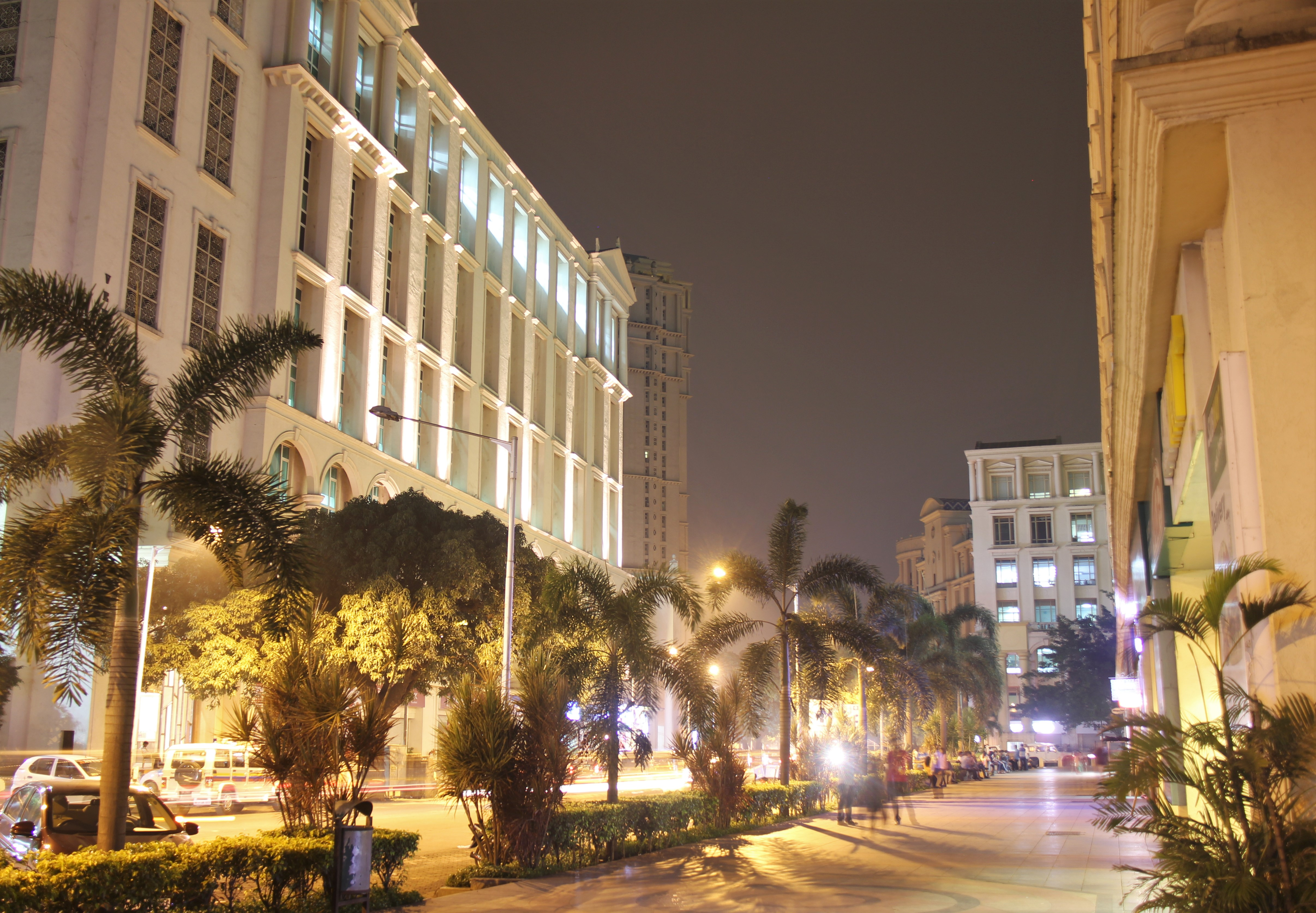
Avenue view from Häagen-Dazs & Krispy Kreme side.

=== CRISIL House ===
CRISIL House is situated on the Central Avenue, opposite D-Mart. Constructed in 2010, the building spreads over 19,659 square metres (211,610 ft^{2}) and houses the headquarters of CRISIL (Credit Rating Information Services of India Limited). CRISIL house is a green building and claims to reduce electricity consumption by 40% and water consumption by 30%.

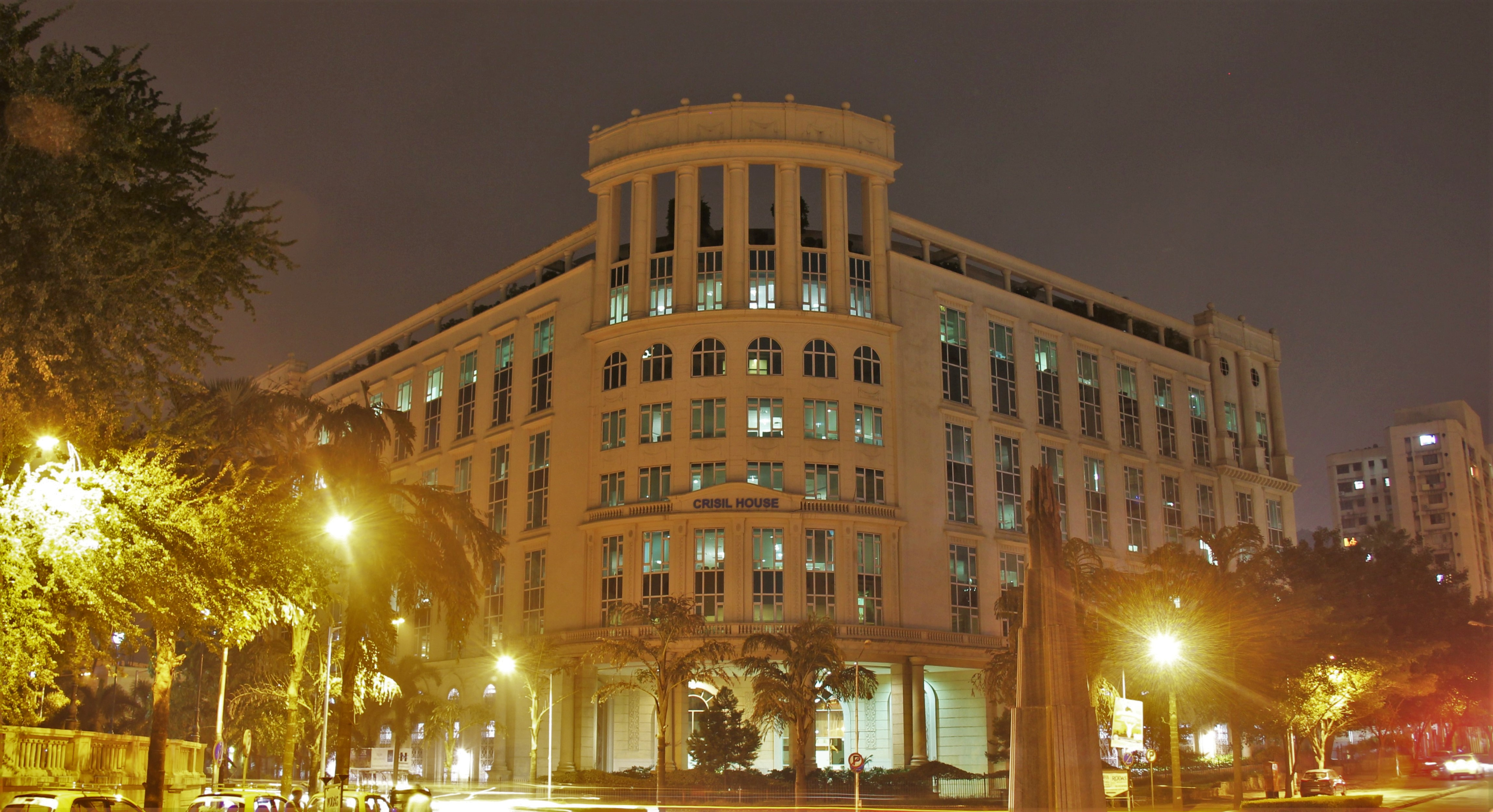
CRISIL House on the Central avenue.

=== Hiranandani Hospital ===
Situated on the Hill Side Avenue, Hiranandani Hospital was constructed and is operated by Hiranandani Group. The hospital started operations in February 2004 and is the first hospital in western India to receive the National Accreditation Board for Hospitals & Healthcare Providers accreditation.

=== Hiranandani Knowledge Park ===
Hiranandani Knowledge Park is situated opposite the Hiranandani Hospital and houses IBS Business School. The school offers bachelor's (BBA), master's (MBA) and doctoral (PhD) degrees in Business administration and management.

The Japanese School of Mumbai, serving Mumbai's Japanese families, is located in the Hiranandani Knowledge Park.

The SDA Bocconi Asia Center, Mumbai, serving as SDA Bocconi School of management, Italy's Pan Asian Hub since 2012 for delivering Executive Education and Postgraduate Programs to the Indian & International Students

=== Schools ===
Hiranandani Foundation School is situated on the intersection of Orchard avenue and High street – opposite Hiranandani Gardens (the garden). Established in 1990, the school follows the Indian Certificate of Secondary Education (ICSE) curriculum and the International Baccalaureate (IB) teaching programs. It offers schooling for students from nursery to twelfth grade. Apart from the Hiranandani Foundation School Powai, there is also Bunts Sangha S. M. Shetty school and IIT Bombay in the vicinity. This institute follows the SSC and HSC educational programs. They have classes from Kindergarten all the way up to Masters programs.

== Governance ==
Although Hiranandani Gardens comes under the Brihanmumbai Municipal Corporation jurisdiction, it is the Hiranandani group that undertakes the cleanliness and road repair work of the area. The township is a part of the Mumbai North Central Lok Sabha constituency and Chandivali assembly constituency.

== In popular culture ==
Many Bollywood films, songs, TV commercials and documentaries are shot in Hiranandani Gardens. A popular book - 03:02 by Mainak Dhar, is predominantly based in Hiranandani Gardens. Some of the popular films shot in Hiranandani Gardens are Haseena Maan Jaayegi (1999), Taal (1999), Kaho Naa... Pyaar Hai (2000), Shakti: The Power (2002), Aankhen (2002), Chalte Chalte (2003), Khushi (2003), Kalyug (2005), Ghajini (2008), No Entry (2005) and Slumdog Millionaire (2008).

== See also ==
- Hiranandani Estate
- Powai
- Niranjan Hiranandani
