= Hiranandani Group =

Indian real estate company

Hiranandani Group is a diversified conglomerate that was established in 1978 by Niranjan Hiranandani and Surendra Hiranandani and is based in Mumbai, Maharashtra, India. The group is one of the largest real estate developers in India with projects across Mumbai, Bengaluru, Chennai, and Hyderabad.

The group has diversified into health, education, energy, and hospitality. In July 2020, the group launched a subsidiary company called Yotta Infrastructure, the world's second largest data centre, Yotta NM1 in its Integrated Yotta Data Center Park, under the subsidiary Yotta Infrastructure, in Navi Mumbai.

== Subsidiaries ==
- Tarq Semiconductors
- Tez Platforms
- Yotta Data Services
- H-Energy Pvt. Limited
- Nidar Group
- Greenbase Industrial and Logistics Parks
- Hiranandani Healthcare & Education
- HOH Capital Partners
- Hirco

== Projects ==
- Hiranandani Gardens, Mumbai
- Hiranandani Estate, Thane
- Hiranandani Foundation Schools
- Hiranandani Foundation School, Thane
- Hiranandani Upscale School
- Dr. L. H. Hiranandani College of Pharmacy

== Controversies ==
A complaint filed by Delhi-based lawyer Advocate Anant Dehadrai revealed that TMC MP Mahua Moitra asked a total of 39 questions, some of which appeared to either support the Hiranandani group or target Adani.

Darshan Hiranandani is in the middle of a controversy over allegations of paying bribes to Trinamool Congress MP Mahua Moitra to ask questions in Parliament.
