= American Academy of Otolaryngology–Head and Neck Surgery =

- Formation: 1896
- Headquarters: Alexandria, Virginia
- Members: 12,000+
- Chair: Kathleen L. Yaremchuk
- Website: https://www.entnet.org
- Formerly called: Western Ophthalmological, Otological, Laryngological and Rhinological Association; Western Ophthalmologic and Oto-Laryngologic Association; American Academy of Ophthalmology and Oto-Laryngology

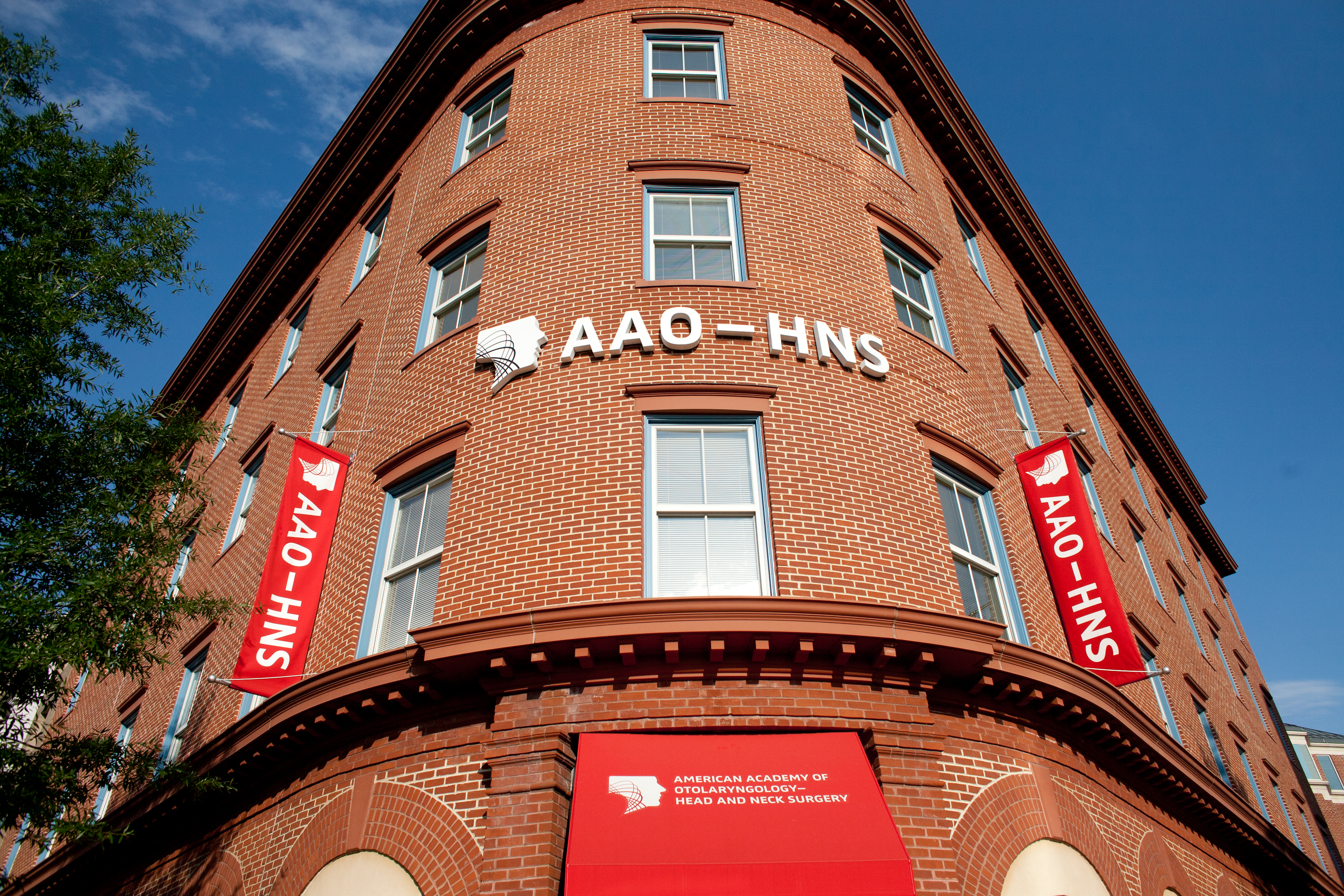
The American Academy of Otolaryngology–Head and Neck Surgery is headquartered in Old Town Alexandria, Virginia.

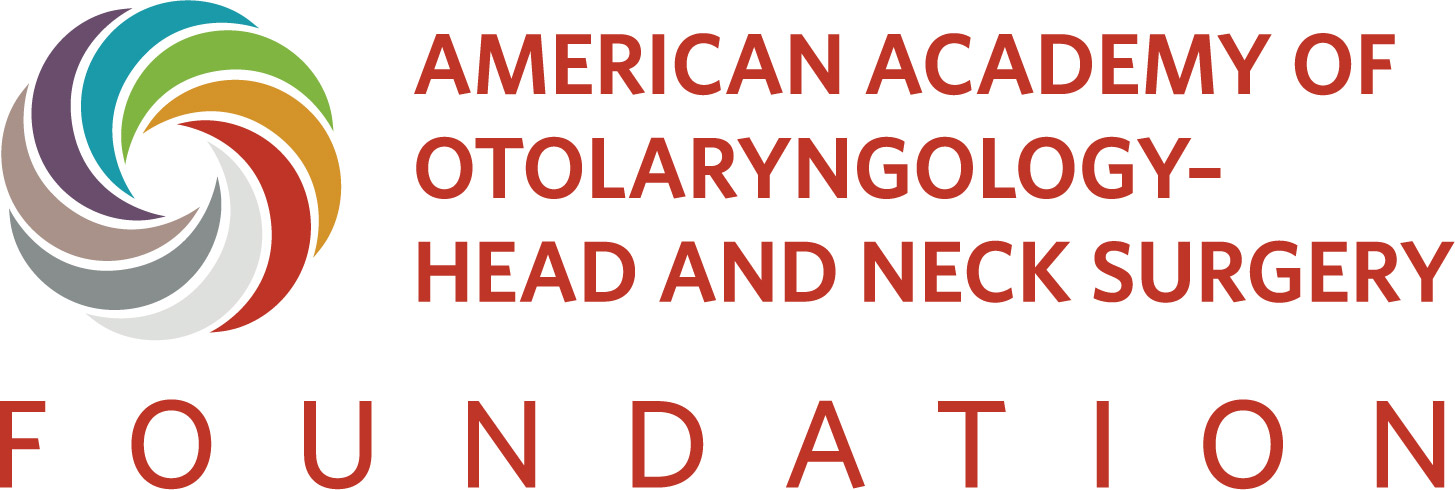
The American Academy of Otolaryngology–Head and Neck Surgery unveiled a new logo June 2018.

The American Academy of Otolaryngology–Head and Neck Surgery (AAO-HNS) is one of the world's largest professional associations for medical specialists, with nearly 12,000 specialists in the area of otolaryngology (otorhinolaryngology) - caring for the ears, nose, and throat and surgery of the head and neck. The medical disorders treated by these physicians are among the most common that afflict all Americans, young and old. They include chronic ear infection, sinusitis, snoring and sleep apnea, hearing loss, allergies and hay fever, swallowing disorders, nosebleeds, hoarseness, dizziness, and head and neck cancer.

== Membership ==
The Academy represents the interests of more than 12,000 ENT physicians worldwide and their patients. Membership categories range from board certified Physicians to Residents.

== History ==
The organization began in 1896 as the Western Ophthalmological, Otological, Laryngological and Rhinological Association ("Western" referred to the Western United States). In 1898, the association became known as the Western Ophthalmologic and Oto-Laryngologic Association. In 1903, it was renamed again to reflect its nationwide membership as the American Academy of Ophthalmology and Oto-Laryngology (AAOO).

By 1962, there was recognition that the specialties of ophthalmology and otolaryngology were diverging enough to warrant separate professional associations. By the early 1970s, some separation of offices and functions was in place.

The AAOO was incorporated in 1978, and was dissolved the following year after the membership voted to create an American Academy of Otolaryngology and an American Academy of Ophthalmology in its stead. The American Academy of Otolaryngology existed for 2 years before adding "Head and Neck Surgery" to its name, yielding the American Academy of Otolaryngology–Head and Neck Surgery in 1980.

In 1981, the American Council of Otolaryngology (ACO), which had formed in the 1960s for purposes outside the scope of the original educational organization (such as lobbying), merged with the American Academy of Otolaryngology–Head and Neck Surgery.
