= Surendra Hiranandani =

Indian-born entrepreneur, co-founder and managing director of Hiranandani Group

- Born: 1954 (age 71–72); Mumbai, Maharashtra, India
- Occupation: Entrepreneur
- Known for: House of Hiranandani
- Spouse(s): Priti Hiranandani(div. 2011); Alka Bhatia (m. 2012)
- Children: 3
- Parent: Lakhumal Hiranand Hiranandani
- Relatives: Akshay Kumar (brother-in-law)
- Website: Website

Surendra Hiranandani is an Indian-born entrepreneur, co-founder and managing director of Hiranandani Group, which engages in real estate business. In 2018, he renounced his Indian citizenship and became a citizen of Cyprus. Surendra is ranked in the Forbes global billionaires list with a net worth of US$1.3 billion as of 2018.

== Early life ==
Surendra Hiranandani was born in 1954 in Mumbai. His father was Lakhumal Hiranand Hiranandani, an ENT surgeon who was awarded the Padma Bhushan by the government of India. He has two older brothers, Navin and Niranjan. The Hiranandani family is of Sindhi heritage.

== Career ==
Surendra served as a Founder and Managing Director of House of Hiranandani Group of Companies. Hiranandani served as a Non-Executive Independent Director of Provogue (India) Ltd from 7 March 2005 to 10 November 2012.

Surendra along with his brother Niranjan bought 250 acres land in Powai Mumbai in 1985 and started real estate business under the name Hiranandani Gardens.

Surendra Hiranandani a Mumbai-based developer and the owner of House of Hiranandani, is learnt to have bought 250 acres in Bangalore, Chennai and Hyderabad for Rs 800 crore. The three land parcels comprise 120 acres in Bangalore, 110 acres in Chennai and 20 acres in Hyderabad Also have plans to enter the real estate market of North and West of India soon.

== Personal life ==
Surendra Hiranandani resides in Mumbai. He has married two times. His first wife was Priti Hiranandani, and they are the parents of three children: two daughters Neha and Komal and a son Harsh. Surendra and Priti divorced in 2009, and the children live with their mother. Neha, who is a University of Virginia alumni is currently the Director of House of Hiranandani.

In December 2012, Surendra married again, becoming the second husband of Alka Bhatia, who was herself a divorcee and the mother of a daughter by her first marriage. Incidentally, Alka is the younger sister of actor Akshay Kumar.
