= List of IIM Ahmedabad people =

This list of IIM Ahmedabad alumni includes notable alumni, professors, and administrators affiliated with Indian Institute of Management Ahmedabad. Note that this is not an exhaustive list.

== Academics ==
- C. K. Prahalad '66, Padma Shri awardee, former Distinguished University professor at University of Michigan Ross School of Business; author of The Fortune at the Bottom of the Pyramid
- Besant C. Raj '66, co-founder and Chancellor of ICFAI University, Hyderabad
- Labdhi Bhandari '67, State Trading Corporation Professor of Marketing, Indian Institute of Management, Ahmedabad
- Marti G. Subrahmanyam '69, Charles E. Merrill Professor of Finance at the Stern School of Business, New York University
- Ravi Jagannathan '72, Chicago Mercantile Exchange/John F. Sandner Professor of Finance at the Kellogg School of Management
- Anil K. Gupta '72, Michael D. Dingman Chair in Strategy, Globalization, and Entrepreneurship at University of Maryland's Robert H. Smith School of Business
- A. Parasuraman '72, Emeritus Professor of Marketing and James W. McLamore Chair Emeritus, University of Miami
- Ajit Rangnekar '72, Dean, Indian School of Business
- Beheruz Sethna '73, first president of University of West Georgia
- V. Kasturi Rangan '73, Malcolm P. McNair Professor of Marketing at Harvard Business School
- Sri Zaheer '75, dean, Carlson School of Management at University of Minnesota
- Sushil Vachani '76, former director, Indian Institute of Management Bangalore
- Srikant Datar '78, Padma Shri awardee, dean at Harvard Business School, formerly Arthur Lowes Dickinson Professor of Business Administration at Harvard Business School
- Gautam Kaul FPM '79, Robert G. Rodkey Collegiate Professor of Business Administration, Ross School of Business, University of Michigan
- Shekhar Chaudhuri FPM '79, former director, Indian Institute of Management Calcutta
- Amitava Chattopadhyay '81, Professor of Marketing and the GlaxoSmithKline Chaired Professor of Corporate Innovation at INSEAD
- Siddhartha Chib '82, Harry C. Hartkopf Professor of Econometrics and Statistics, Olin Business School, Washington University in St. Louis
- S. P. Kothari '82, Padma Shri awardee, Gordon Y Billard Professor of Accounting and Finance and former Head of the Department of Economics, Finance, and Accounting at MIT Sloan School of Management
- Jagmohan Raju '82, Joseph J. Aresty Professor at Wharton School of the University of Pennsylvania
- Manju Puri, '82 J. B. Fuqua Professor of Finance at the Fuqua School of Business at Duke University
- Ashish Nanda '83, former Director, Indian Institute of Management Ahmedabad, former Robert Braucher Professor of Practice at Harvard Law School, and Senior Lecturer, Harvard Business School
- Raghu Sundaram '84, Dean, New York University Stern School of Business
- Arun Agrawal '85, Samuel Trask Dana Professor, School for Environment and Sustainability, University of Michigan
- V. Anantha Nageswaran '86, 18th Chief Economic Advisor to the Government of India
- Rajeev Kakar '87, banker, serial business founder and entrepreneur
- Baba Shiv '88, the Sanwa Bank, Limited, Professor of Marketing at Stanford University Graduate School of Business
- Aseem Prakash '88, Professor of Political Science and Walker Family Professor for the Arts and Sciences, University of Washington
- V. G. Narayanan '90, Thomas D. Casserly, Jr. Professor of Business Administration at Harvard Business School
- Harbir Singh, Mack Professor of Management at Wharton School of the University of Pennsylvania
- Atul Tandon, academic and director of Mudra Institute of Communications, Ahmedabad 2001–2009
- Anand Teltumbde, Senior Professor and Big Data Analytics Head in Goa Institute of Management
- A. K. Shiva Kumar, development economist

== Arts and social work ==
- Shakti Maira '68, artist, sculptor and writer
- Mallika Sarabhai '74, Padma Bhushan awardee, classical dancer; activist; director of Darpana Academy, Ahmedabad
- Chandrika Tandon '75, first Indian-American woman to be elected partner at McKinsey & Company, Grammy Award-winner (2025)
- Vijay Mahajan '80, founder and CEO of the BASIX initiative
- Salil Shetty '83, Secretary-General of Amnesty International
- Nachiket Mor '87, National Director for Bill & Melinda Gates Foundation – India
- Sudip Sharma '02, Writer NH-10, Screenplay Udta Punjab, Executive Producer Udta Punjab
- Gaurav Dagaonkar '06, music director, vocalist and songwriter
- Srijan Pal Singh '09, author, social entrepreneur, former adviser to A. P. J. Abdul Kalam and Founder of Dr. Kalam Centre
- Vanya Mishra PGPX '22, Miss World 2012 top 7
- Mukul Chadda, Indian actor

== Business ==
- Kiran Karnik '68, Padma Shri awardee, former president of NASSCOM
- Vikram Talwar '70, co-founder and former CEO, EXL Service Holdings Inc.
- K. V. Kamath '71, Padma Bhushan awardee, former MD and CEO, ICICI Bank, former chairman, Infosys, and 1st president of New Development Bank (BRICS)
- Sarthak Behuria '73, former chairman of Indian Oil Corporation; former chairman and managing director of Bharat Petroleum
- Jerry Rao '73, founder and former CEO of Mphasis Ltd.
- Chandrika Tandon '75, first Indian-American woman to be elected partner at McKinsey & Company, Grammy Award-winner (2025)
- M. S. Banga '77, Padma Bhushan awardee, former chairman of Hindustan Unilever, currently senior partner at Clayton, Dubilier & Rice
- Ashank Desai '79, Founder and Chairman Mastek, a listed technology services company
- K Raghavendra Rao '79, Padma Shri awardee, founder of Orchid Chemicals & Pharmaceuticals Limited
- Shikha Sharma '80, former MD and CEO, Axis Bank
- Ajay Singh Banga '81, President and chief executive officer, MasterCard
- Ivan Menezes '81, CEO, Diageo
- Piyush Gupta '83, chief executive officer, DBS Bank
- Shrikant Joshi '83, chief executive officer and managing director of L&T Realty
- Ajit Ranade '84, President and chief economist, Aditya Birla Group
- Suresh Vaswani '85, President, Dell Services
- Falguni Nayar '85, founder and CEO, Nykaa
- Amitabh Chaudhry '87, MD and CEO, Axis Bank
- Phaneesh Murthy '87, former CEO of iGATE Corporation
- Archana Garodia Gupta '88, author; owner, Touchstone Gems and Jewellery
- Sanjeev Bikhchandani '89, Padma Shri awardee, founder and executive vice-chairman, Infoedge and Naukri.com
- Rashesh Shah '89, co-founder and CEO of Edelweiss Group
- Nirmal Jain '89, founder and chairman of India Infoline (IIFL)
- Anish Shah '92, Managing Director and CEO at Mahindra Group
- Deep Kalra '92, founder, Chairman and Group CEO, MakeMyTrip
- Ashok Vemuri '92, CEO of Conduent
- Sanjeev Aggarwal '95, founder and CEO, Amplus Energy Solutions
- Rajesh Gopinathan '96, CEO and MD, Tata Consultancy Services
- Sarathbabu Elumalai '06, founder and CEO of FoodKing
- Vineeta Singh '07, CEO, Sugar Cosmetics

== Government and politics ==
- Kirit Raval '73, former Solicitor General of India
- Amit Khare, Secretary to the Vice President of India
- Prem Das Rai '78, Member of Parliament, Sikkim constituency, 15th Lok Sabha
- Arvind Subramanian '81, 16th Chief Economic Adviser to the Government of India
- Jawed Ashraf '86, Ambassador of India to France, former High Commissioner of India to Singapore
- Raghuram Rajan '87, former governor of the Reserve Bank of India; former chief economic advisor of the Government of India and former chief economist at the International Monetary Fund. Currently Katherine Dusak Miller Distinguished Service Professor of Finance at University of Chicago Booth School of Business
- Saurabh Garg '88, CEO, Unique Identification Authority of India (UIDAI), IAS officer
- Prodyut Bora '99, first chief of IT Cell and National Executive Committee member of the Bharatiya Janata Party
- Ramachandran Govindarasu '15, Tamil Nadu politician affiliated with AIADMK
- Pavan Kapoor, Deputy National Security Advisor of India
- Alok Ranjan, former Chief Secretary of Uttar Pradesh
- Jawed Usmani, Chief Information Commissioner of Uttar Pradesh
- Syed Zafar Islam, investment banker; Member of Parliament in the Rajya Sabha; former director at Deutsche Bank and spokesperson of Bharatiya Janata Party
- R. R. Bhatnagar, former Director General of the Central Reserve Police Force, retired IPS officer
- Madhabi Puri Buch, Chairperson of the Securities and Exchange Board of India

== Sports ==
- Harsha Bhogle '85, cricket commentator and journalist

== Science ==
- Suchitra Sebastian '97, condensed matter physicist at Cavendish Laboratory, University of Cambridge

== Literature and journalism ==
- Rohini Chowdhury '86, children's writer and literary translator
- Rashmi Bansal '93, author and entrepreneur
- Chetan Bhagat '97, author, columnist and speaker
- Sidin Vadukut '05, author and former Managing Editor, Mint
- Samit Basu, novelist, graphic novelist and screenwriter

== Faculty ==
- Rakesh Basant, JSW Chair Professor of Innovation and Public Policy
- Labdhi Bhandari, State Trading Corporation of India Professor of Marketing
- Pankaj Chandra, former director, Indian Institute of Management Bangalore and current vice chancellor, Ahmedabad University
- Shekhar Chaudhuri, former director, Indian Institute of Management Calcutta
- Kamla Chowdhry, key founding member of the institute and first faculty member
- Bakul Harshadrai Dholakia, Padma Shri awardee, Director (2002–2007)
- Vijay Govindarajan, New York Times and Wall Street Journal best-selling author, Thinkers50 Hall of Fame 2019 and Coxe Distinguished Professor, Tuck School of Business
- Anil Kumar Gupta, professor, awarded Padma Shri for his contributions to management education
- Frank Land, information systems researcher and was the first United Kingdom Professor of Information Systems
- Harsh Mander, retired IAS officer and former member, National Advisory Council, Govt. of India
- Ravi J. Matthai, first full-time Director, management educationist noted for establishing Institute of Rural Management Anand
- Abhishek Mishra, faculty member for six years before leaving to become a member of Samajwadi Party and an elected MLA of Uttar Pradesh
- Ashish Nanda, Institute Director 2013–2017
- I. G. Patel, former director and 14th governor of the Reserve Bank of India
- Akhileshwar Pathak, professor of business law
- Samuel Paul, Padma Shri awardee, IIMA's second director (1972–78)
- C. K. Prahalad, management thinker, exponent of core competency and The Fortune at the Bottom of the Pyramid
- Rajnish Rai, former DGP, Indian Police; served as assistant professor
- C. Rangarajan, former member of parliament and 19th governor of the Reserve Bank of India
- Jerry Rao, founder and former CEO of the software company MphasiS
- T. V. Rao, Indian human resources professional
- N. Ravichandran, fourth full-time director of The Indian Institute of Management Indore
- Y. Venugopal Reddy, 21st governor of the Reserve Bank of India
- Jahar Saha, institute director 1998–2002
- Dheeraj Sharma, director, Indian Institute of Management Rohtak
- Ashok Som
- Marti G. Subrahmanyam, best known for his research in the areas of corporate finance, capital markets and international finance
- Dwijendra Tripathi, professor of business history for over 25 years; considered the "father of business history" in India

== Administration ==
- N. R. Narayana Murthy, Indian IT industrialist; co-founder of Infosys; first job was chief systems programmer at IIM Ahmedabad
