= Labdhi Bhandari =

Indian marketing theorist

Labdhi R. Bhandari
- Labdhi Bhandari at IIM Ahmedabad in 1977.
- Born: 29 July 1948; Khimel, Rajasthan, India
- Died: 19 October 1988 (aged 40)
- Citizenship: India
- Education: IIM Ahmedabad, Columbia Business School
- Occupation: Professor
- Known for: Marketing Strategy, Social Marketing, General Management

Labdhi Bhandari (29 July 1948 – 19 October 1988), also known as Labdhipatraj Bhandari, was the State Trading Corporation of India Professor of Marketing at the Indian Institute of Management, Ahmedabad and a widely respected authority on marketing in India.

== Early life and education ==
Bhandari was born in 1948 in the village of Khimel, near Rani, Rajasthan, to Akal Kanwar Bhandari and her husband, Dhanpati Raj Bhandari, a successful lawyer in Sojat and a member of the Indian National Congress. He grew up in Sojat where he was initially home schooled and then attended a local Hindi-medium government school. At the age of 14, he moved to Jodhpur for his undergraduate studies at the University of Jodhpur, taking a bachelor's degree in economics in 1965. He then applied and was admitted to the second batch of the new Post-graduate Programme in Management offered by the Indian Institute of Management, Ahmedabad, where he was the youngest student at the age of 17. He was awarded the National Merit Scholarship in both the years and took his diploma from IIMA with the 5th rank in 1967.

== Career ==
Bhandari was recruited straight out of IIM Ahmedabad by Hindustan Lever Limited in 1967 to work in their marketing division. At HLL, he was the product manager of Surf (detergent) during India's first detergent war, where he played an important role in defending Surf's leadership position in the Indian market against Swastik Oil Mill's Sway detergent. Later he headed the Client Services Group of the Marketing Research department as the youngest Senior Manager in the company, in which role he did the early market research that led to the development of Liril.

In 1972, Bhandari was recruited by Ravi J. Matthai to the faculty of his alma mater, the Indian Institute of Management, Ahmedabad. The institute sponsored his doctoral studies through a Ford Foundation grant and he earned his PhD in 1976 from the Columbia Business School working with Prof. John U. Farley and writing a dissertation on Social Marketing. His dissertation, entitled Communications for social marketing: a methodology for developing communication appeals for family planning programs, won the Honorable Mention in the John A. Howard/AMA Doctoral Dissertation Competition in 1976. He is considered a pioneer of social marketing in India by his colleague Prof. Anil Kumar Gupta.

In 1976, Bhandari returned to the faculty of Indian Institute of Management, Ahmedabad where he was acknowledged as an excellent teacher by his students and colleagues and, in time, described as the 'star' of the marketing faculty and the leading marketing academic in the country. He served as the Chairman of the Marketing Area, of the Management Education Program (MEP), and of Management Development Programmes. He was also the first Chairman of the Kasturbhai Lalbhai Management Development Centre, and was responsible for the first major upgrade of its facilities. He also served on the second Committee for Future Directions and chaired the Institute's Task Force on International Management. In 1986, he won a research award from the Colgate Darden Graduate School of Business Administration at the University of Virginia where he spent a summer. According to V. Krishnamurthy, then Chairman of the Board of Governors of IIM Ahmedabad, Bhandari was in the running to succeed Prof. NR Sheth as Director of the institute in 1989 after his name was prominently proposed by both the faculty and the alumni. He had been sounded out about the likelihood of his selection just before his death in 1988.

Bhandari was a highly sought-after management consultant. His clients included Citibank India, Hindustan Unilever, Marico, Crompton Greaves, ITC (company), Lipton India, Madura Coats, Blue Star India, State Timber Corporation of Sri Lanka, State Bank of India, Hindustan Motors, Automobile Products of India, Tea Board of India, and Steel Authority of India. He served on the Board of directors of Enfield India, EID Parry, Semi-Conductor Laboratory and the Cement Corporation of India. Through his consultancy work, he mentored future corporate leaders like Harsh Mariwala of Marico and Jerry Rao. He also served as a consultant to the Commonwealth Secretariat for the management of public enterprises among its member countries. He was a nominated member of the advisory group on Consumer Industries appointed by the Planning Commission of India. In the year of his death, he was nominated by the Ministry of Commerce as a member of the Steering Committee of the Trade Development Authority of India and the National Committee on the Long Term Strategy for the Development of the Tea Industry and Chairman of the sub-committee on Marketing and Export of Tea.

== Research ==
Bhandari's main body of research focused on the role and influence of marketing issues in socio-economic development and poverty alleviation. For his doctoral work, he developed a methodology based on the ECHO technique devised by Richard Barthol and Gary Bridge, for identifying value-based communication appeals that were likely to influence people's attitudes and beliefs about family planning, and which could form the basis of a marketing campaign. After returning to the Indian Institute of Management, Ahmedabad, he focused on issues of consumption in developing countries, especially among the poor. In a series of papers, he and his colleagues showed that the consumption of the poor masses, apart from just being dependent on their disposable income, was also constrained and influenced by the marketing system of the country which included the activities of various institutions, the distribution network, policy etc. Bhandari analyzed the consumption needs of the masses in India and showed that they were not being adequately met either by public or private firms in the organized sector, or firms in the small-scale or cottage industries sector as was intended by government policy, even for products that they could afford. In later work, he highlighted the biases of planners in thinking of the poor mainly as producers and the consequences of such a bias for poverty alleviation. He was one of the first to put forth the view that it was crucial to consider the poor as consumers when making policy for development, because their quality of life is more directly linked to their consumption activities rather than their income or productivity. Bhandari's research contributed to, and was part of, a development in marketing that was represented by the International Society of Markets and Development.

Bhandari also carried out research studies of textile distribution, and the international marketing of tea.

== Death and legacy ==
He died in the crash of Indian Airlines Flight 113 in Ahmedabad at the age of 40. The Indian Institute of Management, Ahmedabad instituted an endowment in his memory. This endowment has sponsored the IIMA Conference on Marketing Paradigms for Emerging Economies, which also awards the Labdhi Bhandari best paper award. Classroom 3 at IIMA has been named the Prof. Labdhi Bhandari classroom in his honor. The IIMA Alumni Trust has also instituted a scholarship in his memory. Bhandari is the subject of the Reconstructing LRB biographical project.
