= Rangnekar =

Rangnekar is a surname. Notable people with the surname include:

- Ahilya Rangnekar (1922–2009), Indian politician
- Ajit Rangnekar, dean of the Indian School of Business
- Khandu Rangnekar (1917–1984), Indian cricketer
- Motiram Gajanan Rangnekar (1907–1995), Marathi writer
- Sharif D Rangnekar, communications consultant, journalist, and human rights activist
