= Ashok Vemuri =

Indian-American businessman

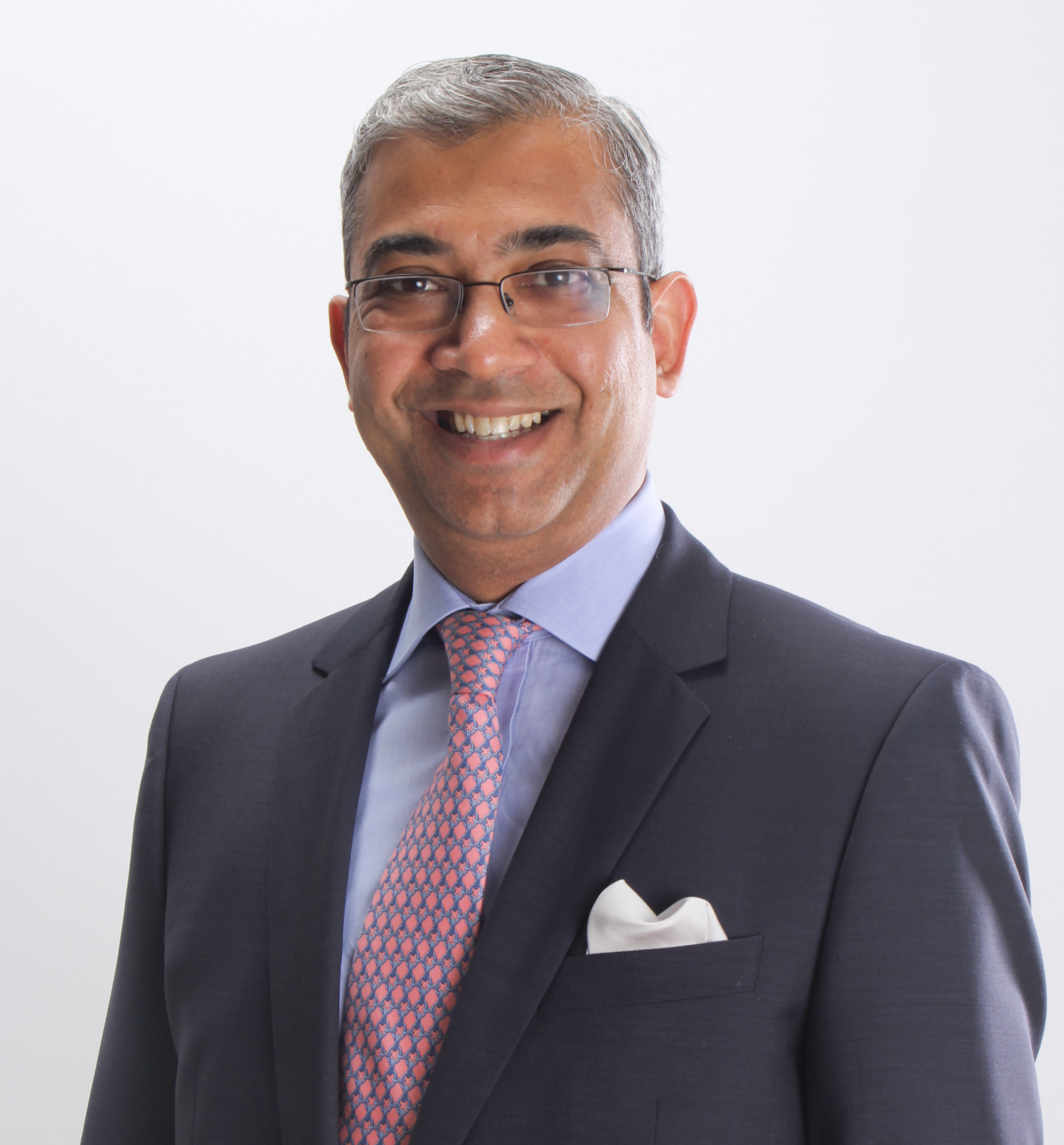
- Born: April 22, 1968 (age 57); New Delhi, India
- Citizenship: Indian-American
- Education: St. Stephen's College, Delhi; Delhi University
- Alma mater: Indian Institute of Management, Ahmedabad
- Occupation: Board of Director
- Years active: 1992-present
- Organization: Kroger
- Known for: Infosys

Ashok Vemuri (born April 22, 1968) is an Indian-American business executive, and Board of Director for Financial Policy and Public Responsibilities at Kroger. Vemuri was the former chief executive officer of IGATE and Conduent.

== Early life and education ==
Ashok Vemuri was born on April 22, 1968, and spent his childhood in India. He received a bachelor's degree in physics from St. Stephen's College, Delhi. Vemuri subsequently completed his postgraduate diploma in business management at the Indian Institute of Management, Ahmedabad, which is equivalent to a master's degree.

== Career ==
=== Early positions and Infosys (1992–2013) ===
In 1992 Vemuri began working in investment banking at Deutsche Bank AG and Bank of America. Vemuri joined Infosys in 1999, where he went on to work closely with and be mentored by Narayana Murthy, the co-founder and then-CEO of the company. As of May 2003, Vemuri was serving as vice president and regional manager of sales for Canada and the northeast region of the United States. After management changes in June 2009, Forbes India reported that "Subhash Dhar, Ashok Vemuri, V. Balakrishnan and B.G. Srinivas... are now coming under [the limelight at Infosys]. These five are among a band of leaders being groomed to take over from the founding team." Vemuri was soon serving as a senior vice president of Infosys, and became a member of the company's executive council.

Vemuri went on to hold management roles at Infosys. For a time he served as chairman of the company’s operations in China, also serving on the boards of Infosys in the Americas and Infosys Public Services. Beyond heading Infosys' operations in Canada and eastern North America, he furthermore headed both the Financial Services & Insurance Business division and the Banking, Capital Markets & Strategic Global Sourcing division. Vemuri was appointed to the board of Infosys in June 2011, while retaining his roles as senior vice president and chief of the banking division. Infosys appointed Vemuri the global head of its Manufacturing & Engineering Services division in April 2012. Despite speculation in the press that Infosys was considering Vemuri as a choice for CEO, in September 2013 the press reported that he would instead by joining iGATE.

=== Work with iGATE (2013–2014) ===
On September 16, 2013, Vemuri was appointed CEO and president of the IT services provider iGATE, Early in his tenure, Vemuri assured shareholders that the $770 million in debt accrued by iGATE in 2011 would be dealt with in the "near-term," and by March 2014 iGATE had raised $325 million to repay part of the debt.

After the company beat analysts expectations for first quarter earnings in 2014, that April the Economic Times reported that Vemuri had "abandoned the lofty revenue target set by his predecessor" in an effort to set "short-term, achievable growth targets for the company." In the first half of 2014, under Vemuri, iGATE engaged in a "hiring for growth" program and added 2,500 employees, bringing the headcount to 32,742 employees by June 2014. In July 2014, Vemuri was credited with securing a deal with CNA Financial, estimated to be worth around $200 million.

=== Capgemini acquisition (2015) ===
By March 2015, iGATE's stock value had increased since the start of Vemuri's tenure, with the company reaching a market capitalization of $3.3 billion. iGATE also had around 33,000 employees and revenues of about $1.3 billion, much higher than the annual revenue of $851.6 million from 2013. During his first eighteen months at iGATE, the press noted that Vemuri had helped "the firm’s market capitalisation increase almost three times." In April 2015, the French IT company CapGemini announced it would buy iGATE for USD $4 billion, creating a larger company with clients such as General Electric and Royal Bank of Canada. Vemuri led iGATE's side of the sale, and in July 2015 was voted into Capgemini's group management board. Vemuri resigned as iGATE CEO in October 2015.

=== Conduent CEO (2016–2019) ===
Xerox Corporation announced on June 14, 2016 that Vemuri had been chosen as the CEO of Conduent, Xerox's business process outsourcing unit, which was in the process of being separated as a new independent company. The outsourcing division had been struggling to meet its financial benchmarks, with the Economic Times opining that "Xerox is betting on IT industry veteran Vemuri's experience to help the company revive its outsourcing business." Xerox chairman and CEO Ursula Burns stated Vemuri had been selected because of his "deep industry experience and proven track record of leading growth and corporate transformations." Vemuri was appointed executive vice president and CEO of Xerox Business Services LLC, effective July 1. He became the CEO of Conduent after the separation of Xerox into two companies later that year. In May 2019 he resigned from the post of CEO in 2019 Q1 Earnings call. He left Conduent early August 2019.

== Boards and memberships ==
Vemuri served on the board of directors for a number of companies. Vemuri was elected to the Forum of Young Global Leaders (YGL) by the World Economic Forum in 2009, and from June 2011 until September 2013 he served on the board of Infosys Limited. While with Infosys, he also had tenures on the boards of Infosys Consulting, Infosys Public Services, and Infosys Technologies (China) Company Limited. From September 2013 until October 2015 he served on the board of iGATE Corporation, also joining the board of iGate Global Solutions on September 17, 2013. Vemuri joined the Board of IT Governors at the World Economic Forum in 2014, and Capgemini's group management board in July 2015. He served on the board of visitors of the Fuqua School of Business at Duke University.

== Awards and recognition ==
Selected awards and accolades for Ashok Vemuri
Year	Award	Category	Result
2008	Business Today	India's 25 Hottest Young Executives	Shortlisted
2013	Asian American Business Center	50 Outstanding Asian Americans in Business	Shortlisted
2015	Enterprise Asia	Outstanding Entrepreneurship Award	Won
2015	IAIR	CEO of the Year	Won

== Personal life ==
Vemuri lived with his wife in New Jersey as of 2009, where he continued to be based as of 2016.

== See also ==
- List of IIM Ahmedabad alumni
- List of chief executive officers
- List of Indian-Americans
