= R. R. Bhatnagar =

Indian police officer

Rajiv Rai Bhatnagar IPS
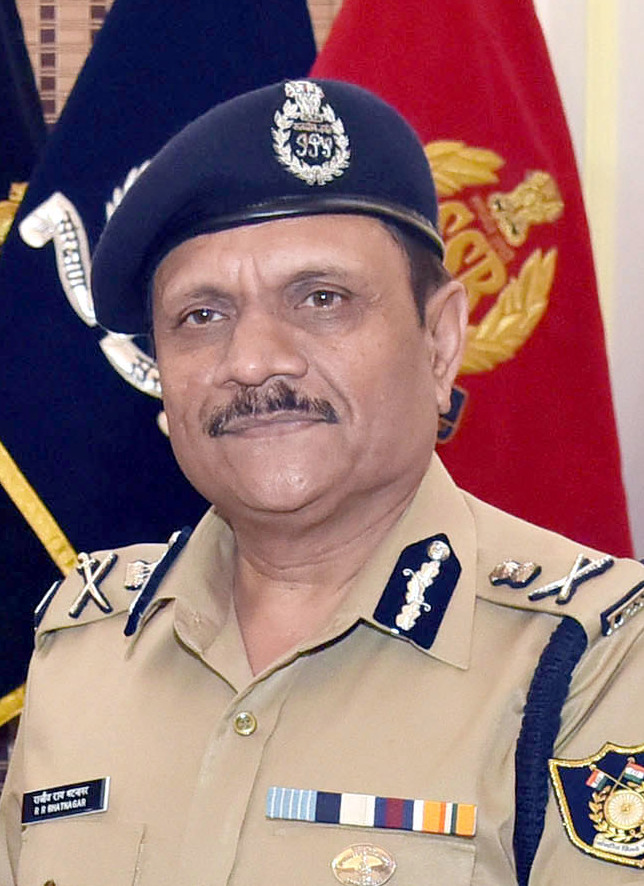
- Bhatnagar in 2017

Advisor to the Lieutenant Governor of Jammu and Kashmir
- Incumbent
- Assumed office January 2020

Director General of the Central Reserve Police Force
- In office April 2017 – 31 December 2019

Director General of the Narcotics Control Bureau
- In office February 2016 – April 2017

Personal details
- Born: 30 December 1959 (age 66) Bulandshahr district, Uttar Pradesh
- Education: Master of Science; Masters of Philosophy; Post Graduate Diploma in Management
- Alma mater: Indian Institute of Management Ahmedabad

Rajiv Rai Bhatnagar (born 30 December 1959) is a retired Indian Police Service-1983 batch officer of the Uttar Pradesh cadre. Served in different capacities in the various state and central law enforcement organisations, Bhatnagar received the President's Police Medal for Distinguished Service on 15 August 2007. He served as the Director General of the Central Reserve Police Force (CRPF) in his last tenure of service till his retirement on 31 December 2019. He was appointed an advisor to the Lieutenant Governor of Jammu and Kashmir G. C. Murmu by the Government of India in January 2020.

== Personal life ==
Rajiv Rai Bhatnagar was born on 30 December 1959 to K. R. Bhatnagar. He is a native of Bulandshahr district, Uttar Pradesh. He studied Master of Science at college and later finished Master of Philosophy. He attended Indian Institute of Management Ahmedabad and studied Post Graduate Diploma in Management over there. His wife is a practicing physician in Delhi.

He was sent in the mandatory quarantine period in the last week of May 2020 for coming in contact with his family members, wife and son, who tested positive for coronavirus disease 2019 after returning from Delhi. He handed over the charge of the departments he oversees as an advisor to Advisor Kewal Kumar Sharma.

== Career ==
Bhatnagar joined the Indian Police Service in 1983 and was assigned Uttar Pradesh cadre after the training. He received the President's Police Medal for Distinguished Service on 15 August 2007. He was appointed an Additional Director General in the Central Industrial Security Force in April 2015. He became the Director General of the Narcotics Control Bureau, an-ADG rank at the Central deputation, in February 2016. He was appointed the Director General of the CRPF in April 2017. He was known for his commanding roles during combating operations related to naxalite generated violence. He retired from the Indian Police Service on 31 December 2019 after heading the CRPF for over a span of two and a half years in his last tenure of service. He received ceremonial farewell and reviewed parade in his honour at Central Reserve Police Force Academy, Kadarpur, Gurugram, Haryana. The Government of India appointed him an advisor to the Lieutenant Governor of Jammu and Kashmir G. C. Murmu in January 2020, joining other three advisors Farooq Khan, Baseer Ahmad Khan and Kewal Kumar Sharma. He advises the Lieutenant Governor in the matters related to the Department of Health and Medical Education, the Department of Public Health Engineering and Irrigation and Flood Control, Transport Department, the Department Of Animal and Sheep Husbandry and the Department of Public Works (Roads and Buildings). The Lieutenant Governor, by passing an order on 15 January 2020, made Bhatnagar the exclusive authority to decide on matters related to the transfers of officials in Jammu and Kashmir Police from the rank of station house officer. This decision attracted objections from the different police officers in the union territory.
