= Sanjeev Aggarwal =

Indian businessman

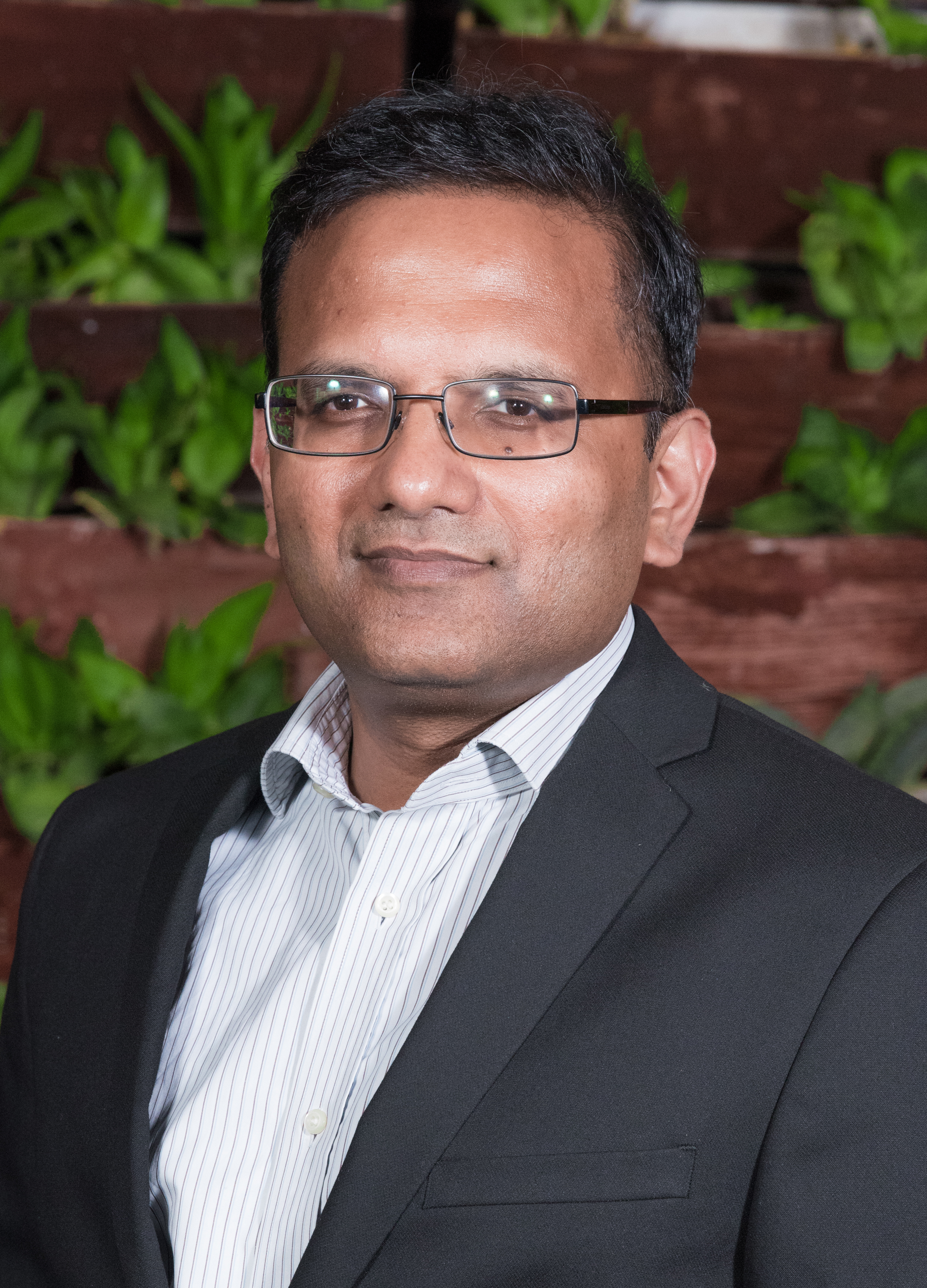
- Born: 1970 (age 55–56)
- Education: IIM Ahmedabad (PGDM); Jamia Millia Islamia
- Occupations: Chairman & Former CEO of Amplus Solar

Sanjeev Aggarwal (born 1970) is an Indian businessman. He is the founder of energy company Amplus Solar, acquired 100% in 2019 by Petronas for US$391 million, for which he was the former CEO. He exited Amplus in 2022 and founded Renewable Energy and Decarbonization platform Hexa Climate in 2023. As in May 2024, he is acting as the Executive Chairman at Hexa Climate. Hexa's group firms are present in over seven countries, including Japan, Malaysia, Taiwan, South Korea, Singapore, Philippines, and now in India. Sanjeev also received the Federation of Indian Chambers of Commerce and Industry young leaders award in 2013.

== Personal life and education ==
Aggarwal studied mechanical engineering from Jamia Millia Islamia, New Delhi. He holds a Postgraduate Diploma in Management (PGDM, equivalent to MBA) from Indian Institute of Management, Ahmedabad.

== Career ==
Prior to starting Hexa Climate, Sanjeev was the founder, MD & CEO of green energy company Amplus Solar. Before Amplus Energy, Aggarwal worked at AES India, the Indian subsidiary of the US fortune 200 company AES Corporation. At AES, Aggarwal was involved in the development of AES's bulk capacity greenfield project, a 1200 MW electricity plant with a combined captive coalmine in Chhattisgarh. After Aggarwal's departure from AES in March 2010, he tried multiple businesses which almost led him to becoming insolvent, they included bidding for hydrocarbon blocks (no blocks were awarded), setting up a gas plant (gas turned out to be a poor business).

Aggarwal started Amplus Energy Solutions in 2010, got the first solar rooftop contract in 2013 and raised ₹3.2 crore (equivalent to US$400,000 in 2023) from family and friends. In 2015 he secured an investment of US$150 million in equity funding from I Squared Capital, an American investing company. As of 2017, Amplus is one of the largest companies in the OPEX project development space according to Bridge To India, a consultancy and knowledge services provider specialising in renewable energy. In 2019, Amplus was acquired 100% by Petronas for US$391 million (about ₹2700 Crore); Aggarwal continued as CEO. Aggarwal and his company have been the subject of a case study by Indian Institute of Management, Ahmedabad.

Aggarwal writes articles on various industry blogs and newspapers such as LiveMint and VCCircle's Infracircle. He is on various industry committees, including on the Infrastructure Power Committee of the American Chamber of Commerce in India (AmCham India), India Electricity 2009 Advisory Council, and the Federation of Indian Chambers of Commerce and Industry Power Committee.

== Awards and recognition ==
Aggarwal received the Federation of Indian Chambers of Commerce and Industry (FICCI) young leaders award in 2013. In 2017 he was listed in Solar Quarter magazine's 100 most powerful leaders in the Solar Industry.

Aggarwal received the Jury Recognition award – Individual Excellence at the Renewable Energy India (REI) 2019 held at IEML, Greater Noida in September 2019. The auditorium where the award felicitation ceremony happened was powered by Amplus Solar's 2 MW Rooftop Solar Plant.

Aggarwal has been chosen as one of the 100 Most Powerful Solar Business Leaders in the Indian PV Market and has also featured in the Power100 Map of year 2019 at the Solar Quarter's 3rd Edition of Powerful Solar Business Leaders.
