= Shrikant Joshi =

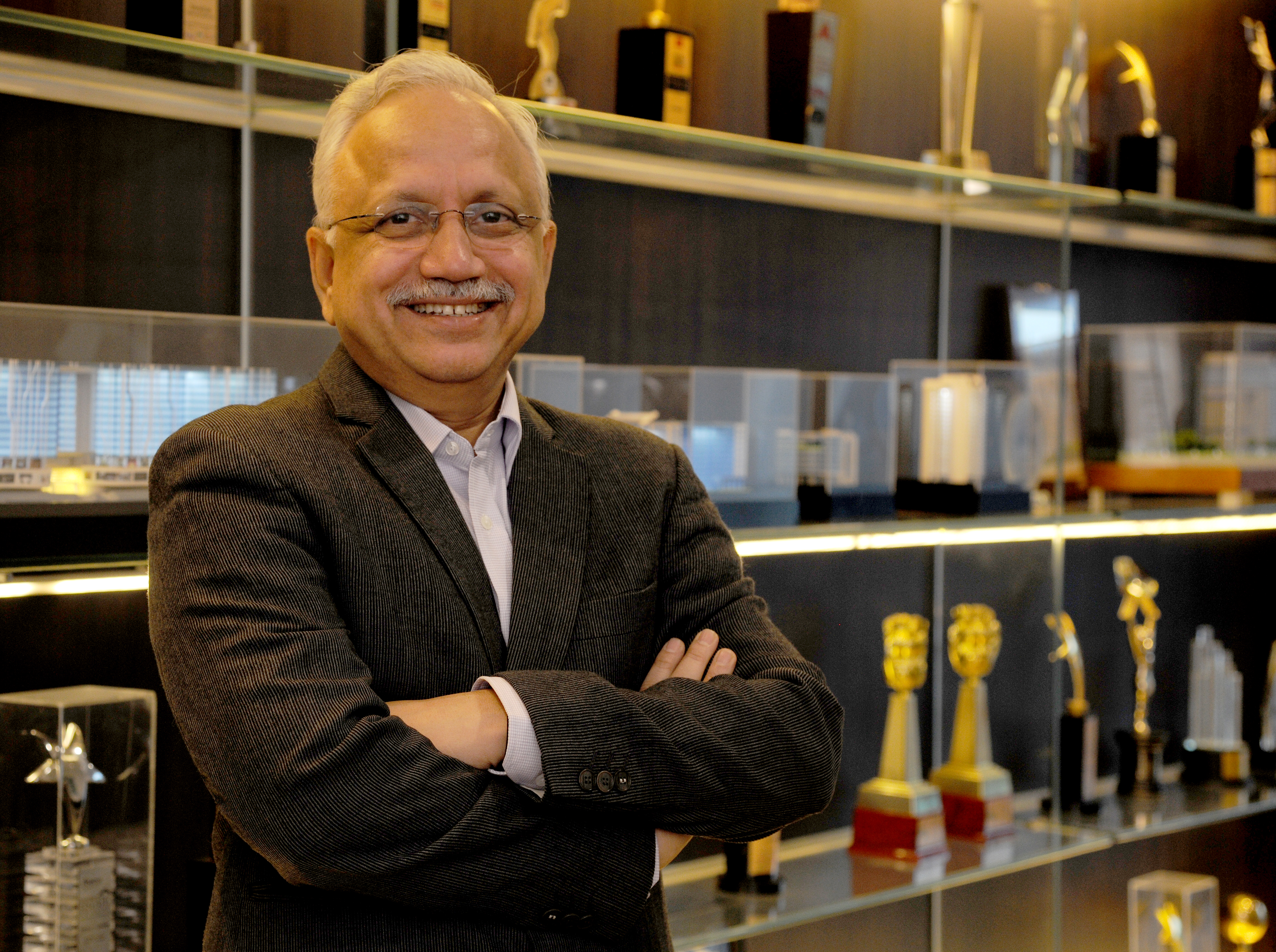
- Born: Maharashtra, India
- Education: PGDBM from IIM, Ahmedabad and B.Tech from IIT, Delhi
- Occupations: Member of Ecom & Advisor to CMD, L&T Realty
- Spouse: Jyotsna Joshi
- Children: 2

Shrikant Prabhakar Joshi is the Member of Ecom & Advisor to CMD of L&T Realty, the Real-estate arm of a $21 billion building and development conglomerate Larsen & Toubro Ltd.

He is a graduate of IIT Delhi and IIM Ahmedabad and has over 37 years of experience across associations such as Wipro, Philips, Heinz, Sify and Emaar Group.

== Career ==
Joshi started his profession with Wipro, being employed at the IIM Ahmedabad grounds; he had a long and effective incumbency of 13 years from 1983 to 1996. He was one of the founders of Wipro Lighting, one of the quickest, developing, lighting arrangement organizations in India. He was additionally part of the Wipro Infotech Group and chaired the Marketing Council in the Wipro Corporation.

At Philips (1996–2000), he had acquired the title Internationally Certified Auditor for the Philips Leadership Labs & Philips Quality Award. He conducted numerous peerless grade audits in China and Singapore and was also an assessor for their Leadership labs.

During his tenure at Sify (2000–2006), the company proceeded to transform into the biggest cyber cafe franchisee working in India under his leadership. Their home endorser base reached over 1,00,000 subscribers. Sify was the initial organization to launch high-quality internet telephony in India with its principal goal to make universal calls reasonable for customers. He collaborated with the Indian Institute of Banking to direct their professional examination online at Sify iWays.

He also briefly worked at Heinz (2000–2001), where he effectively helped familiarize the well-known Heinz Tomato Ketchup across India.

Currently, he oversees the operations and strategic direction of L&T Realty and L&T Edutech. He is also a member of the Group HR Council, contributing to HR transformation initiatives across the L&T Group. In addition, he provides strategic guidance to the Corporate Communication & Marketing Council and plays a key role in the brand transformation of L&T. He is also involved in developing a strong leadership pipeline and succession management framework for key roles across the L&T Group.

== Real-estate journey ==
Joshi began his real-estate stretch with Emaar MGF where his distinction drove him to lead the organization in 2008 as their CEO, proceeding to serve in the organization for an additional three years before joining L&T Realty in the year 2011 as a CEO. He is currently filling in as the CEO and MD of the organization.

In the commercial real-estate space, Mr Joshi has driven the improvement of India's first transit-oriented development venture spanning across 2.7 million sq. ft. in phase 1 at Seawoods Grand Central, Navi Mumbai. The Seawoods Grand Central is a blend of an implanted travel zone (train station), business spaces and a retail shopping centre all under one rooftop. The retail shopping centre (presently known as Nexus Shopping centre) was offered to Blackstone Group for Rs. 1450 crores (US$226 million) in March 2017.

On May 26, 2017, Joshi reported the arrangement to launch three retail shopping centres enveloping a region of 1.2 million sq ft in Hyderabad by the end of the year. The extent of the undertaking was a surprising 18.5 million sq ft and it has an installed travel zone (Metro station) in its development as well.

On August 2, 2017, Joshi reported that there would be an agreement between L&T Realty and Nirmal Lifestyle Developers to collectively develop a project. "With this launch, L&T Realty would be developing close to 15 million sq. ft of residential space within Mumbai alone. The proposed development of over 3 million sq. ft comprising over 2,000 apartments will be developed in phases spanning seven to eight years and has an estimated project revenue of close to Rs 5,000 crore" said Mr Joshi. This land package involves roughly 20-acres on the LBS Marg in Mumbai's north-focal region of Mulund.

On September 8, 2017, Joshi stated that the global pharmaceutical company Teva's arm Watson Pharma had rented an area of 105,000 sq. ft. in L&T Realty's office complex, Seawoods Grand Central in Navi Mumbai, as office space, with further headway to extend to an extra 28,000 sq. ft. of built-up area. With this total take-up region of 133,000 sq. ft, it is the second-largest office area lease in recent years.

On December 25, 2017, referring to moneylenders searching for developers with credibility, Joshi stated in an interview with Business Standard, "Several proposals exploded on us, our deal pipeline with lenders also has grown 10 times in the past two-three months". He additionally emphasized with other developers, saying, "...With RERA coming in, landowners and developers are rethinking their real estate strategies, people who have land parcels are looking for credible partners on the other side..."

The real estate industry is in a revival in residential deals as information from Q3 FY18 showed positive signs towards home purchasers demonstrating interest. "There has been a revival in residential sales in the Q3 FY17-18. L&T Realty has seen an uprise in sales across our three projects in Mumbai and Bengaluru. Our projects, Emerald Isle, Phase-II in Powai, have drawn an unprecedented interest, generating around 2,000 walk-ins in 120 days. Also, the sales velocity at our maiden project in Bengaluru is at an all-time high. Our total gross sales for Q3 FY17-18 stand 20 per cent higher than the sales of Q3 FY16-17," said Joshi to Business Standard. L&T Realty's latest undertaking is Rejuve 360, another forthcoming residential venture in Mulund West, Mumbai, Maharashtra.

As per LiveMint, on January 19, 2018, Joshi with L&T Realty addressed the arranged development of three SBDs (secondary business districts) in, Kharbao (Bhiwandi), Nilaje (Kalyan) and Shedung (Panvel) according to the ongoing Maharashtra government provincial arrangement. These new improvements will increase openings for work in locales around Vasai-Virar, Mira-Bhayander, Thane, and Bhiwandi. Joshi said, "Unlike the prior generation, the millennials aren't keen on spending a few hours of their workday travelling, urging realty developers to plan markets closer to where the labour force is, Seawoods Grand Central one of the few transit-oriented developments in India."

On July 4, 2018, Joshi addressed the IIM Ahmedabad 2018-19 PGPX batch on the topic, "Real Estate Industry: New paradigms and trends"

On December 14, 2019, Business Standard published an article featuring Joshi, who mentioned that L&T Realty sold 490 apartments out of the 510 it launched in the Seawoods area of Navi Mumbai – a huge success in an otherwise sluggish market. "The company is seeing good customer interest in the already launched project at Mulund in Mumbai", said Joshi. Besides, the sizes of the apartments are also becoming smaller and prices are becoming more appropriate. "Earlier a two-bedroom apartment would cost Rs 2.25 crore but today, we are launching it at Rs 1.5 crore (in Mulund)," he said. Furthermore, he included, "Today, we ensure a clubhouse is ready with the first customer's handover." L&T Realty is stepping mindfully despite a couple of good residential launches and with the RERA in effect, developers must stay aware of client commitments. Not only does the organization guarantee promise timely ownership of homes, but it also guarantees that comforts like clubhouses are prepared with quick possession. In the current testing market, developments like L&T Realty have an edge because of a solid brand name, budgetary muscle and development capacities.

The December 19th, 2019, edition of the Economic Times, featured an article by Joshi. The article states that the real estate sector is being propelled by advancements in three major constituents: government, judiciary, and customers. Recently introduced reforms like the goods and services tax (GST), Real Estate (Regulation and Development) Act (RERA), and the Benami Transactions (Prohibition) Amendment Act have streamlined transactions. Many legacy processes have been overhauled, and several approvals now need no manual intervention, thanks to an overall push towards digitization.

== Personal life and education ==
Joshi was born in Malkapur, Maharashtra and raised in Bhilai, the steel city of Chhattisgarh. He graduated from IIT Delhi in 1981 and then completed PGDBM from IIM, Ahmedabad in 1983. He also attended the Breakthrough Program at the University of Lausanne, Switzerland in 2015. His wife, Jyotsna Joshi, is an architect working for L&T Construction.

== Board memberships and affiliations ==
- 2024 – present: Member of Ecom & Advisor to CMD, L&T Realty
- 2019 – present: Member, Board of Governors, IIM Ranchi
- 2018 – present: Director, L&T Metro Rail Hyderabad
- 2016 – 2024: Managing Director, L&T Realty
- 2012 – present: Board Member, L&T Realty
- 2012 – present: Director, L&T Seawoods Limited

== Awards and honors ==
- Under the guidance of Mr. Shrikant Joshi, L&T Realty received the 'Recognition For Being Among The Best In The Industry' by The Great Place to Work Institute India, for inspiring trust, instilling pride, and creating an environment that promotes camaraderie and making L&T Realty one of India's Best Workplaces in Indian Real Estate Industry.
- Exemplary Contribution to the Real Estate Industry' at Times Real Estate Awards & Conclave 2023

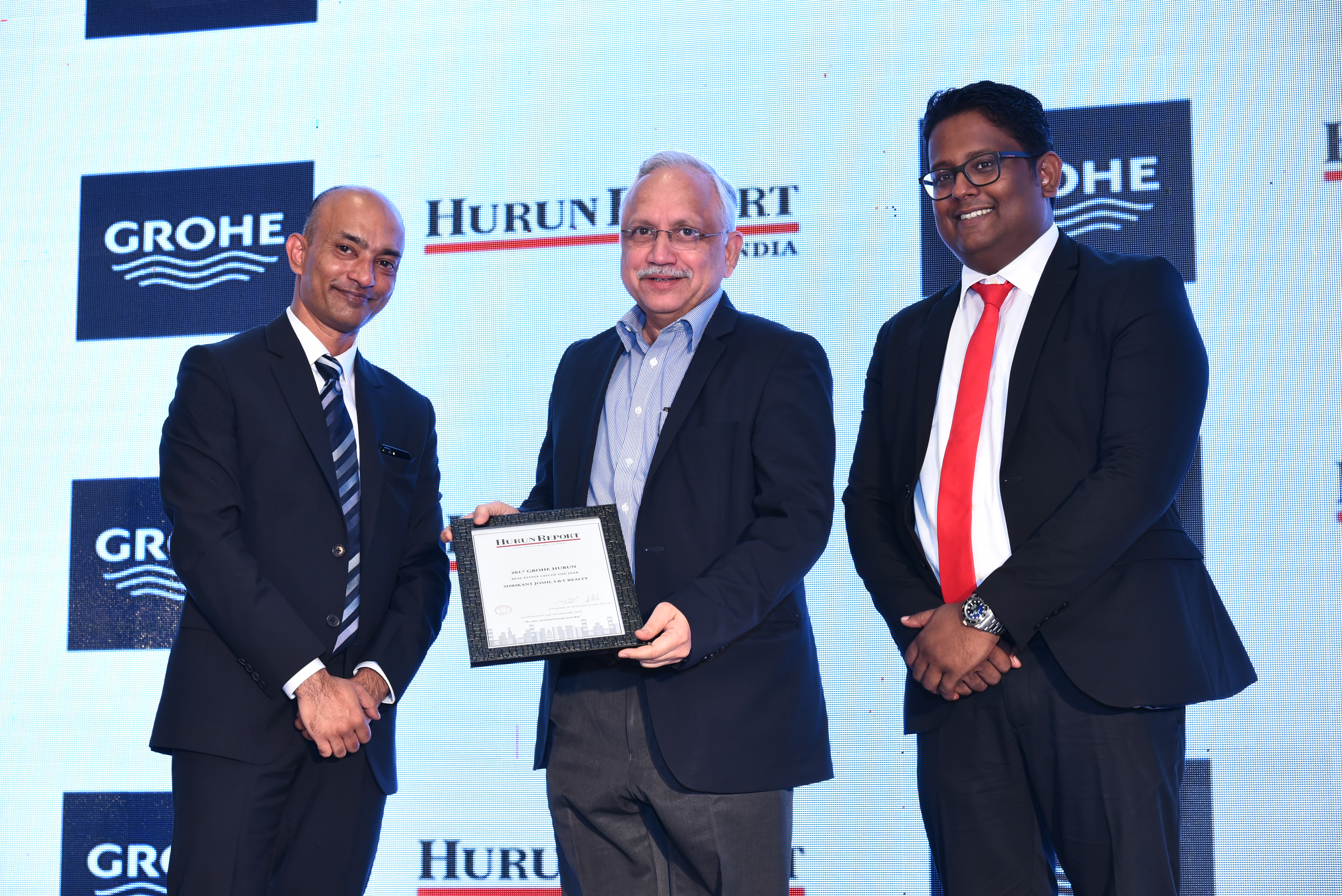
Shrikant Joshi receiving the 'Real Estate CEO of the Year 2017' award at Grohe Hurun Real Estate Leadership Summit in Mumbai, January 18, 2018

- 'Real Estate CEO of the year 2017' by Grohe Hurun Real Estate Leadership Summit and Excellence Awards
- 'Scroll of Honor' at Realty Plus Excellence Awards 2015
- Distinguished Alumni of IIM A
- Distinguished Alumni Award of IIT Delhi for the year 2026
