= Ashank Desai =

Indian entrepreneur

- Born: India
- Education: IIT Bombay; Indian Institute of Management Ahmedabad
- Occupations: entrepreneur, philanthropist investor

Ashank Desai is an Indian entrepreneur, philanthropist and investor. He is the founding member and past chairman of Nasscom an Indian non-governmental trade association and advocacy group, focused mainly on the technology industry of India. He is the founder and chairman of Mastek, a global technology services company.

== Biography ==
Desai graduated in Mechanical Engineering from the Indian Institute of Technology (IIT), Bombay in 1974. He also holds a post graduate diploma in Business Management (PGDBM) from the Indian Institute of Management, Ahmedabad where he graduated in the year 1979.

Desai has been involved in CII last ten years as Committee Member. He is also the former president of the Asian Oceanian Computing Industry Organization (ASOCIO). The Ashank Desai Centre for Policy Studies at IIT Bombay was set up in 2016 to provide a fillip to the study of public policy. In 2021, The Indian Institute of Management, Ahmedabad launched the Ashank Desai Centre for Leadership and Organizational Development (ADCLOD), that offers training, research, and consulting services to leaders at various levels in Indian and multinational organizations.

== Honors and awards ==
- In 2021, Desai was honored with the Dataquest Lifetime Achievement Award.
- He has been felicitated by the Prime minister of India, Narendra Modi, for his contribution to NASSCOM and the IT Industry over the last 25 years.
- Desai is a recipient of the Distinguished Alumnus Award from IIT Bombay in the year 2002.
