= Dwijendra Tripathi =

Indian historian of business (1930–2018)

Dwijendra Tripathi (29 July 1930 – 5 September 2018) was a professor of business history at the Indian Institute of Management, Ahmedabad where he worked for more than 25 years. He is considered the "Father of Business History" in India.

== Personal life and education ==
Dwijendra was born on 29 July 1930 in a village in Azamgarh district, Uttar Pradesh, while India was still under British colonial rule. He got a First Class in his Class XII exams in the Arts stream. He studied at the University of Allahabad where he received his Bachelor of Arts in history, economics, and English literature in 1952 and his Master of Arts in history in 1954. He graduated in 1963 from the University of Wisconsin where he pursued a Ph.D. in comparative economic history - India & U.S. as a Fulbright scholar. He was married to his wife Saraswati for more than fifty years, and had three children- Tushar, Parimal, and Smita. He died on 5 September 2018, which is also the day India celebrates Teachers' Day.

== Career ==
=== In India ===
From August 1954 to April 1964, he worked at the department of history and political science, D.N.J. College, University of Jabalpur. In May 1964, he moved to Bombay (now Mumbai) to work at the State Bank of India as a Research Officer in their Historical Research Department. In July 1964 he joined the Indian Institute of Management, Ahmedabad where he chose to teach in the Economics educational area. He was sent by the institute to the Harvard Business School, which had a tie-up with IIMA, for the International Teachers Programme for a year in 1964. While at IIMA, he was on numerous committees, was the PGP Chairperson for four years, and was also dean for four years. He joined the Board of Governors of IIMA as a faculty representative in the 1980s.

=== At other universities ===
In the summers of 1961, 1962, and 1963 respectively, he worked as an instructor at the University of Wisconsin, Madison, George Washington University and Howard University, and University of Wisconsin Milwaukee. He was a research assistant at University of Wisconsin from 1961-1962 and 1962-1963. In 1970, he was visiting professor at the Department of American Studies, Jawaharlal Nehru University. He taught at the University of Utah, Salt Lake City for a year in 1979. From 1985–1986 he was a visiting research fellow at the Institute of Developing Economies, Tokyo. He was a visiting researcher (American Fellowship) at Brown University from March to June 1992. In 2002-2003 he was the General President of the Indian History Congress.

To honour his legacy, the International Conference on Indian Business & Economic History in Memory of Prof. Dwijendra Tripathi will be held on 29-31 August 2019, at the Indian Institute of Management, Ahmedabad.

== Writing ==
Some of Tripathi's vast range of works include:

- Dating the Destiny: Thirty Five Years of the Larsen & Toubro. (1975)
- Themes and Perspectives in American History: Essays in Historiography (1978)
- The Dynamics of a Tradition: Kasturbhai Lalbhai and His Entrepreneurship (1981)
- Tribute to Ethics: Remembering Kasturbhai Lalbhai (1983), co-editor
- Towards a New Frontier: History of the Bank of Baroda (1985)
- State and Business in India: A Historical Perspective (1987), author and editor
- Historical Roots of Industrial Entrepreneurship in India and Japan: A Comparative Interpretation (1997)
- Alliance for Change: A Slum Upgrading Experiment Ahmedabad (1998)
- The Oxford History of Indian Business (2004)
- The Concise Oxford History of Indian Business, with Jyoti Jumani (2007)*
- Dynamics of Ascent: A Centenary History of Bank of Baroda (2007)
- The Oxford History of Contemporary Indian Business (2013)
