= N. Ravichandran (professor) =

- Born: 11 August 1955 (age 70)
- Citizenship: India
- Education: MSc Annamalai University; PhD Indian Institute of Technology, Madras
- Occupation: Director
- Employer(s): Indian Institute of Management Ahmedabad, Indian Institute of Management Indore
- Known for: Operations management

N. Ravichandran was the 4th (regular) director of The Indian Institute of Management Indore. He is an MSc in maths from Annamalai University and holds a PhD from Indian Institute of Technology, Madras. He is currently a professor at IIM Ahmedabad in the area of operations management and quantitative techniques. He started the five-year Integrated Management Programme at IIM Indore and increased the batch size of the flagship PGP programme from 240 to 450.

He is also credited with rapid creation of world-class infrastructure at IIM Indore. In his tenure, infrastructure was not only envisioned but also implemented in record time. He has also introduced the PGP at RAK in UAE and PGP at Mumbai programmes. The idea behind the PGP at RAK is to meet the demand for skilled managers in the Gulf region. The motive to start PGP at Mumbai is to help IIM Indore connect with the finance and the consulting industries. On the burning issue of high EMIs and the restriction on graduates to be able to take risks, he believes that it was a real problem and that steps need to be taken to simplify this situation. He shares his point of view on placements and career opportunities and believes that IIM Indore will be at its peak by 2015. He also says that while he hopes that students at IIM Indore get the best possible career opportunities, the institution is in the business of imparting education and not in the business of being a placement agency. According to him, the best schools in the world do not have a placement process, and Indian schools need to rethink the concept of a formal placement process.

He has been a visiting faculty to many academic institutions in Europe and India. He was a public representative on the governing board of Bombay Stock Exchange up to April 2006. He is also a director at Madhya Pradesh Power Transmission Company Limited and Madhya Pradesh Stock Exchange. He is a non-executive director of Madhya Pradesh Paschim Kshetra Vidyut Vitaran Company Limited and independent director of Pithampur Auto Cluster Limited. He was also an Independent non-executive director at Gujarat State Petroleum Corp. Ltd. since 21 December 2009.

His area of research includes: information technology strategy, competitiveness, operations management, quantitative methods, applied simulation and stochastic processes and their applications. His current research interests include stochastic models in management science and management information systems. He has authored more than 50 research papers in his area of research.

== Personal life ==
Ravichandran was born in Thiru Ahindrapuram, Cuddalore district, Tamil Nadu. He has two sons – Piran, who is an assistant professor at Vanderbilt University, and Jagan, who is a pediatrician currently pursuing a fellowship specialising in intensive care paediatrics at Michigan Children Hospital, Detroit.

== Books ==
- N. Ravichandran (1999) (Editor), Competition in Indian Industries: A Strategic Perspective, Vikas Publishing Co. Ltd, New Delhi.
- N. Ravichandran, (1998) (Co-Editor), Corporate Strategy and Government Policy: Some Linkages, IIMA Publication.
- N. Ravichandran (1991) (Editor), Microcomputers in Materials Management, Wiley Eastern Limited, India.
- N. Ravichandran (1990) Stochastic Methods in Reliability Theory, Wiley Eastern Limited, India.

== Research papers ==
- N. Ravichandran (2007), A Finite Horizon Inventory Model: An Operational Framework, International Journal of Production Economics, 108 (2007) 406–417.
- N. Ravichandran (2007), Coordinator, Genesis – Creating Value through Entrepreneurial Initiatives, Colloquium, Vikalpa, Vol. 32, No. 2, April–June 2007.
- N. Ravichandran (2007), A Finite Horizon Inventory Model: An Operational Framework, International Journal of Production Economics, Elsevier, 108 (2007), pp. 406–415
- N. Ravichandran (2007), Building World Class Educational Institutions in India: Challenges and Prospects, Colloquim, Vikalpa, Vol. 32, No. 1, January–March 2007.
- N. Ravichandran and Ankur Roy (2006), Orchid Chemicals and Pharmaceuticals Limited: Managing the Value Chain Transformation, Richard Ivey School of Business, The University of Western Ontario, London, Ontario, Canada, IVEY, 9B06M071.
- N. Ravichandran and Doorva Bahuguna (2006), Rule Bound Government Agency to Customer Centric Facility: Can Indian Passport Offices Make the Leap? IIMB Management Review, March 2006 Issue, Volume 18 Number 1, pp. 59–66.
- N. Ravichandran (2006), Hospital Supplies Management: A Radical Prescription, Effulgence, Vol. 4, No. 1, January–June 2006, pp. 13–20.
- N. Ravichandran (2005), Supply Chain Planning in a Process Industry in India: A Case Study, Metamorphosis, A Journal of Management Research, IIM Lucknow, Volume 4, Number 2, 2005, pp. 157–169.
- N. Ravichandran and I.V. Subba Rao (2005), A Process oriented Approach to Waiting Line Management in a Large Pilgrimage Center in India: A Case Study, The Smart Manager, Vol 5, Issue 1, pp. 69–76.
- N. Ravichandran and Manish Srivastava (2005), Revolutionizing Blood Banking in India: Prathama Blood Center, The ICFAI University Press, February 2005, pp. 48–62.
