= Shekhar Chaudhuri =

Indian academic and management professor

- Born: India
- Citizenship: India
- Scientific career
- Fields: Strategic Management, Technology Management
- Institutions: Indian Institute of Management Calcutta, Calcutta Business School, Kolkata

Shekhar Chaudhuri is an Indian academic and management professor. He is a former director of the Indian Institute of Management Calcutta.

Currently, Chaudhari is the director with Calcutta Business School, a fully residential premium Management Institute located close to IIM Calcutta.

Chaudhuri graduated from IIT Kharagpur in 1972 with a B.Tech. (Hons) degree in mechanical engineering and is a fellow of Indian Institute of Management Ahmedabad with specialization in business policy. Subsequently, he worked for Larsen & Toubro Limited as a graduate engineer trainee. On completion of his doctoral studies in 1979, he joined Calico Mills, Ahmedabad, where he initially worked as staff assistant to the vice chairman and managing director and later as manager of the cloth department and manager of the organization development cell. In 1981, Chaudhuri moved into academics and joined his alma-mater IIM Ahmedabad as an assistant professor in the business policy area. He worked at IIM-A till November 2002, when he joined IIM Calcutta as the director of the institute.

Chaudhuri has held faculty and administrative positions in several institutions of higher learning in his long career. During August 1989 and August 1991, he was a visiting professor in the Department of Management at the College of Business and Administration, Southern Illinois University Carbondale; visiting professor in the Strategy, Organization and Human Resources Group at ESCP Europe in its Paris campus during October – December, 1998; and dean of the Vinod Gupta School of Management, IIT Kharagpur during the period of May 2000 to December 2001.

Chaudhuri has been a consultant to several organizations both in the private and public sectors. Besides, he has also been a consultant to the World Bank. At the World Bank, Chaudhuri led the Indian part of a major international research effort on Institutional and Policy Priorities for Industrial Technological Development.

Chaudhuri has been a Senior Fulbright Fellow at U. C. Berkeley, U.S.A.; visiting scholar at the Twente University of Technology, Enschede, Netherlands; Visiting Professor of Strategic Management in the College of Business and Administration, Southern Illinois University at Carbondale, Illinois, USA (1989-1991); and visiting professor at ESCP, Paris, France. He was the President of the Association of Indian Management Schools (AIMS) in 2006 and has been a member of the Executive Board of the Association of Management Development Institutions in South Asia (AMDISA) and sits on the boards of several business organizations and management schools. In 2009 he received MIT-MAEER’S Bharat Asmita Acharya Shreshtha Award (Best Teacher in Management) from the Vice-President of India and in 2012 he received the Ravi J Mathai National Fellowship Award from AIMS.

He sits on the boards/governing councils of several organizations/institutions, including Xavier Institute of Management, Bhubaneswar; Indian Jute Industries' Research Association, Kolkata; Assam Institute of Management; and Gujarat Industries Power Corporation Limited. Currently he is a member of the National Manufacturing Competitiveness Council set up by the Government of India.

Chaudhari served the position of founding director at school of management and entrepreneurship, Shiv nadar university for 2 years.

Currently, Chaudhari is the director with Calcutta Business School, a fully residential premium Management Institute located close to IIM Calcutta.
