= V. G. Narayanan =

American economist

- Born: Vilangadu G. Narayanan
- Education: Padma Seshadri Bala Bhavan; University of Madras; Indian Institute of Management Ahmedabad; Stanford University; Institute of Chartered Accountants of India
- Occupation: Academic
- Employer: Harvard Business School

V. G. Narayanan is an Indian-born American economist. He is the Thomas D. Casserly Jr. Professor of Business Administration Chair at Harvard Business School. He is the author of one self-published book and many research articles.

== Early life ==
Narayanan was born to a Tamil family in Tamilnadu, India. Narayanan attended PSBB Senior Secondary School, Chennai, and subsequently graduated from the University of Madras in 1988. Post that he completed his PGDM from Indian Institute of Management Ahmedabad in 1990 and subsequently earned a PhD in business from the Stanford Graduate School of Business in 1995.

== Career ==
Narayanan joined the Harvard Business School as a faculty member in 1994. He is now the Thomas D. Casserly Jr. Professor of Business Administration Chair. In 2023 he became the Senior Associate Dean of Executive Education and HBS Online.

Narayanan is the author of two self-published books, and the author of many research articles.
