= Jagmohan Raju =

American marketing professor and author

Jagmohan Raju is an American marketing professor and author. He is the Joseph J. Aresty Professor and Director of the Wharton-Indian School of Business Program at Wharton Business School, University of Pennsylvania. Professor Raju is internationally known for his research on Pricing. He is the author of the book Smart Pricing.

== Education ==
Raju has a Ph.D. in business, M.S. in operations research and an M.A. in economics from Stanford University, an MBA from the Indian Institute of Management, Ahmedabad, and a BTech from the Indian Institute of Technology, Delhi.
