= Sri Zaheer =

Former Dean of the Carlson School of Management
- In office March 8, 2012 – July 2, 2023
- Preceded by: Alison Davis-Blake

Personal details
- Born: West Bengal, India
- Education: Women's Christian College, Chennai (BS); Indian Institute of Management Ahmedabad (MBA); Massachusetts Institute of Technology (PhD)

Srilata (Sri) Zaheer is an Indian academic administrator who served as the 12th dean of the Carlson School of Management at the University of Minnesota. She holds its Elmer L. Andersen Chair in Global Corporate Social Responsibility in the Department of Strategic Management and Entrepreneurship

== Early life and education ==
Zaheer grew up in Durgapur in West Bengal, India and attended high school in Chennai. She pursued a Bachelor of Science in physics from the Women’s Christian College at Madras University. She then earned her MBA with a focus on finance and control from the Indian Institute of Management and then a PhD in international management from the Sloan School of Management at the Massachusetts Institute of Technology.

== Career ==
After earning her MBA in 1975, Zaheer worked for multinationals such as Tata Consultancy Services and Sandoz (India) Ltd. In 1981, she moved to Nigeria with her husband and began working as a journalist for Business International as well as teaching at a university. She attended the Sloan School at the Massachusetts Institute of Technology from 1986 to 1992, where she completed a dissertation comparing the role of incentives and culture on risk-taking and performance in U.S. and Japanese banks.

=== Carlson School of Management, University of Minnesota ===
Zaheer accepted a faculty position as assistant professor at the University of Minnesota’s Carlson School of Management in 1992. She has held a number of positions at the school, including as a department chair, PhD coordinator, and the associate dean of faculty and research. Her work has been honored by such organizations as the Academy of International Business and the Academy of Management. She is a Fellow of the Academy of International Business, and a former Consulting Editor of the Journal of International Business Studies.

On March 8, 2012, Zaheer was appointed dean of the Carlson School of Management. She was the twelfth person to hold the position, the second woman to do so, and the first person of Indian descent to serve as dean at the University of Minnesota.

== Volunteerism, awards, and recognition ==
On January 1, 2020, Zaheer was appointed as chair of the Federal Reserve Bank of Minneapolis’ board of directors. She has served on the board in other capacities since January 2017.

== Personal life ==
Zaheer is married to Aks Zaheer, who is the Curtis L. Carlson Chair in Strategic Management at the Carlson School. They first met on stage in a play in their first year at business school. They have two children.
