= Akhileshwar Pathak =

Indian academic

- Born: India

Academic work
- Discipline: Law, globalisation
- Institutions: Indian Institute of Management; Ahmedabad

Akhileshwar Pathak is a professor of business law at the Indian Institute of Management, Ahmedabad.

== Education ==
He holds a doctorate in law from University of Edinburgh, U.K. and an LL.B. from the Delhi University.

== Areas of interest ==
His areas of research interest are corporate law, globalisation and liberalisation of India.

== Books ==
- Contested domains: the state, peasants, and forests in contemporary India (SAGE Publications, 1994, ISBN 978-0-8039-9184-2)
- Law, strategies, ideologies: legislating forests in colonial India (Oxford University Press, 2002, ISBN 978-0-19-565557-5)
