= Sarthak Behuria =

Indian businessman, predominantly

Sarthak Behuria is an Indian businessman, predominantly active in the petroleum industry. Currently he is the Group President at Modi Enterprises, primarily entrusted with the task of expanding the Group’s operations internationally. Behuria previously held leadership positions at Bharat Petroleum Corporation and the Indian Oil Corporation Limited.

== Career ==
Behuria acquired a degree in economics from St. Stephen’s College in New Delhi before gaining a post-graduate qualification in business administration from the reputed Indian Institute of Management, Ahmedabad. He began his career in the energy industry by joining Burmah Shell in 1973, after which he was absorbed in Bharat Petroleum Corporation (BPCL), wherein he served varied portfolios in supply and distribution, sales, industrial relations and downstream infrastructure, before rising to the position of chairman and managing director in the year 2002. During his time at BPCL, Behuria transform the organisation’s retail operation by focusing on customer expectations. He was the driving force behind the successful ‘Pure for Sure’ campaign which emphasised the importance of quality for the first time in the oil industry. In 2005, Behuria was appointed as the Chairman of the Indian Oil Corporation (IOC), replacing MS Ramachandran, who retired in February 2005.

During his five-year stint at IOC, the PSU grew steadily in the Fortune 500 rankings with a 25% annual increase in revenues. His strategic initiatives with regards to diversification as well as backward and forward integration drove IOC towards development and a 100% increase in revenue growth over a five-year period. His tenure as chairman at IOC was not extended, as Brij Mohan Bansal was selected to take up Behuria’s place after his retirement in the year 2010.

In 2011, Behuria was appointed by Krishan Kumar Modi as Modi Enterprises' Group President as well as the Chairman of the Corporate Executive Committee.

== Honours and awards ==
- Conferred the Honorary Fellowship of Energy Institute, UK – for distinguished contribution to the energy industry (2006)
- SCOPE Award for Excellence and Outstanding Contribution to Public Sector Management’ – Individual Category (2006–07)
- Named among the top 10 most influential oilmen in India by Upstream
- Odisha Living Legend Award (2013)
