= Dheeraj Sharma (professor) =

Management professor

Dheeraj Sharma is a professor of management and director of Indian Institute of Management Rohtak.

== Career ==
He has been director of the Indian Institute of Management Rohtak since 2017, and was a full professor on leave from Indian Institute of Management Ahmedabad.

Sharma has advised the prisons department of Punjab, state of Gujarat and state of Delhi on marketing of goods made by prisoners and modernisation of jails, and has advised the Border Security Force and Central Reserve Police Force on stress avoidance, perception management, and effectiveness.

Sharma is member of economic advisory council of Haryana and a member of the task force for prospective and planning under the aegis of Haryana Governance Reforms Authority Haryana.

In April 2025, the Board of Governors at IIM Rohtak placed Sharma on leave and directed him to vacate the campus until the ongoing inquiry into "misappropriation of public funds."

== Awards and recognitions ==
In 2019, Sharma received the Education Leadership Award for his work as Director, IIM, Rohtak.

== Controversies ==
- In 2022, the Government of India informed the Punjab and Haryana High Court that Sharma, the director of IIM Rohtak, did not meet the role's educational requirements and had misrepresented his qualifications. The court issued a show cause notice on 28 March 2022, alleging that Sharma failed to submit a graduation degree for nearly five years and demanded an explanation. While the court initially stayed action against him after his April 2022 plea, it lifted this stay on 22 October 2024, allowing the government to proceed with a final order and take appropriate action.
- There are lawsuits pending before the Punjab and Haryana High Courts and the Rohtak District Court against him, involving various cases, including sexual harassment. and being unsuited for the office of director.
- In January 2024, following amendments to the Indian Institutes of Management Act, 2017, the Ministry of Education initiated an inquiry into IIM-Rohtak's finances. Allegations include the "illegal" transfer of ₹2 crore (equivalent to ₹2.1 crore or US$220,000 in 2026) to the director's account as "variable pay." The ministry assigned its Principal Chief Controller of Accounts to investigate embezzlement claims against Sharma, along with concerns about excessive student fees.

== Publications ==
- Cross Cultural Perspectives in a Global Marketplace
- Proceedings of the 2007 Academy of Marketing Science (AMS) Annual Conference
- Swinging the Mandate: Developing and Managing a Winning Campaign
