= Ashish Nanda =

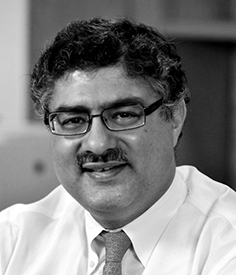

Director Indian Institute of Management, Ahmedabad
- In office September 2013 – April 2017

Personal details
- Education: Indian Institute of Technology Delhi; Indian Institute of Management Ahmedabad; Harvard University
- Occupation: Professor

Ashish Nanda is a business economist and professor who is the former Director of the Indian Institute of Management Ahmedabad (IIMA).

Nanda joined IIMA as Director on 2 Sept 2013. Upon taking charge, Nanda described IIMA as "a hidden jewel."

In addition to his administrative responsibilities, Professor Nanda teaches in PGP, PGPX, and Executive Education Programs at the Institute. Before joining IIMA, Nanda was Robert Braucher Professor of Practice at Harvard Law School for 7 years. Before that, he was a Harvard Business School faculty member for 13 years. He was Officiating Director, IIM Nagpur from its inception in 2015 to 2017 and Fellow, Harvard Business School Executive Education from 2013 to 2017. He is Distinguished Fellow, Harvard Law School Executive Education.

== IIMA Activities ==
Nanda's vision for IIMA is "to educate leaders of enterprises." His strategic thrust at the Institute has been to (a) connect proactively with 5 constituencies (research, practice, policy, alumni, and connectivity), (b) nurture a high performance culture at the Institute (by fostering autonomy, stretch, and community; and) (c) grow the Institute in strategic areas (including expansion of Executive Education and PGPx programs, starting a School of Public Policy at the Institute, and recruiting faculty at entry level and lateral positions).

Nanda led significant fund raising efforts at IIMA. He was actively involved in discussions leading to drafting of the IIM Bill, which affords IIMs strategic and operational autonomy. He has recommended that management education capacity should be expanded in India not only by opening new institutions, but also by growing existing ones.

Nanda has led an initiative for greater diversity in admissions to IIMA, leading to an increase in the proportion of women students and students with non-engineering backgrounds in IIMA.

Nanda had resigned in April 2017, for personal reasons, and the institute, on 30 August, announced the appointment of Professor Errol D’Souza as in-charge director. He announced that he will step aside as IIMA director effectively on 1 September 2017.

== Education & Awards ==
Nanda earned his B.Tech. in Electrical Engineering from IIT Delhi. He completed a Post Graduate Diploma in Management from IIM Ahmedabad and an MA in Economics from Harvard University. He earned a Ph.D. in Business Economics from Harvard.

He has received the IIT Delhi Distinguished Alumni Award, the Henry B. Arthur Fellowship, the Harvard University Centre in Ethics and the Professions Fellowship, the President of India Gold Medal (twice), and the IIMA Director's Gold Medal. In 2016, he was conferred Distinguished Global Thinker Award by IILM.

== Research, Teaching, & Advisory ==
Nanda’s research, teaching, and advisory work focus on leadership, particularly in the context of professional services and institutions of higher education. He has published several case studies and articles and is a coauthor of Professional Services: Cases & Text. During his stint as Director, IIMA, Nanda has written on, and participated in conferences and task forces related to administration of higher education institutions, particularly Indian professional schools.

Nanda has advised professional service organizations including asset management, investment banking, accounting, advertising, consulting (engineering, human resource, IT, management, and strategy), executive search, legal (law firms and legal and compliance departments), public relations, and real estate organizations; human capital intensive organizations, such as pharmaceutical corporations; His work with these organizations has spanned advisory board membership, strategic planning, organization design, governance systems, succession planning, compensation systems, recruitment and promotion practices, and leadership development. He has taught in executive development program tailored for professionals, entrepreneurs, and senior government officials. He has been a non-executive director on boards of public companies, private firms, partnerships, and not-for-profit organizations.

== Personal life ==
Nanda was born in New Delhi in a family originally from West Punjab. He is married to Shubha Nanda, faculty at Tufts University School of Dental Medicine in Boston, Massachusetts. The couple has a son, Pranav Nanda, who is a neurosurgery resident at Massachusetts General Hospital.
