= Kamla Chowdhry =

Indian educationist

Dr Kamla Chowdhry
- Born: Kamla Kapur; 17 December 1920; Lahore, Punjab, British India
- Died: 4 January 2006 (aged 85); New Delhi, India
- Education: Shantiniketan; Calcutta University (BA, 1940); University of the Punjab (MA, 1943); University of Michigan (MA & PhD, 1949)
- Occupations: Educator; social psychologist
- Years active: 1944–2006
- Employers: Ahmedabad Textile Industry Research Association (1949–1961); Indian Institute of Management Ahmedabad (1962–1972)
- Known for: First faculty member and de facto director of the Indian Institute of Management Ahmedabad
- Spouse: Khem Chowdhry (deceased)

Kamla Chowdhry was an Indian educator who was the first faculty member at the Indian Institute of Management Ahmedabad, and a key member in its founding and functioning in its early years.

== Early life and education ==
Kamla Chowdhry, née Kapur, was born on 17 December 1920 in Lahore to a Punjabi Hindu Khatri family. Her father, Ganesh Das Kapur, was a leading surgeon in Lahore; her mother, Lilavati Khanna, came from a family of engineers involved in the building of the Sukkur barrage on the Indus river in Sindh. She pursued her early education at Shantiniketan, founded by Rabindranath Tagore, also learning music and how to play the sitar. After matriculating from Punjab University with a first-class degree in 1936, she earned a BA in mathematics and philosophy from Calcutta University in 1940.

She married a civil services officer named Khem Chowdhry; however, the marriage was short-lived. As during her husband's posting in North-West Frontier Province, he was murdered by a Pashtun tribesman as the couple slept. The tribesman mostly likely bore a grievance. By the time the trial was concluded, a traumatized Kamla had fallen into depression.

However, inspired by a condolence letter that she received from Tagore, she enrolled in the MA program in philosophy at Punjab University, graduating in 1943, having stood first in her class. Between 1944 and 1945, she taught intermediate and BA-level classes at Mahila College, Lahore. She then joined the Michigan State University, graduating in 1949 with a MA and PhD in social psychology. Her PhD was completed under the supervision of Theodore Newcomb who would come to be recognized as one of the most eminent psychologists of the twentieth century.

== Career ==
=== ATIRA ===
Upon completing her Ph.D., Chowdhry returned to India and joined the Ahmedabad Textile Industry Research Association in 1949 as one of its first four recruits. Founded in 1947 by Vikram Sarabhai, scion of a family of textile industrialists based in Ahmedabad, ATIRA sought to apply scientific techniques in the research of industrial problems. At ATIRA, Chowdhry headed the Psychology division, later known as the Human Relations division, until 1961 and was the Director of the Research Centre for Group Dynamics from 1958 to 1961. Chowdhry studied how socio-economic conditions, food habits, and behavior of workers in the textile mills of Ahmedabad. Her work led to a transformation in the relationship among stakeholders in the mill industry and contributed to improved productivity and shop floor coordination in mills over the next decade. As a result of her findings, workers and employees were able to gain a better understanding of wage and contract negotiations. Her division at ATIRA also collaborated with the United Nations to study tensions among textile industry workers.

== In popular media ==
Neha Chauhan portrayed Kamla Chowdhry in the Hindi web series Rocket Boys

== Death ==
Kamla Chowdhry died on 4 January 2006 in Delhi
