= Ajit Rangnekar =

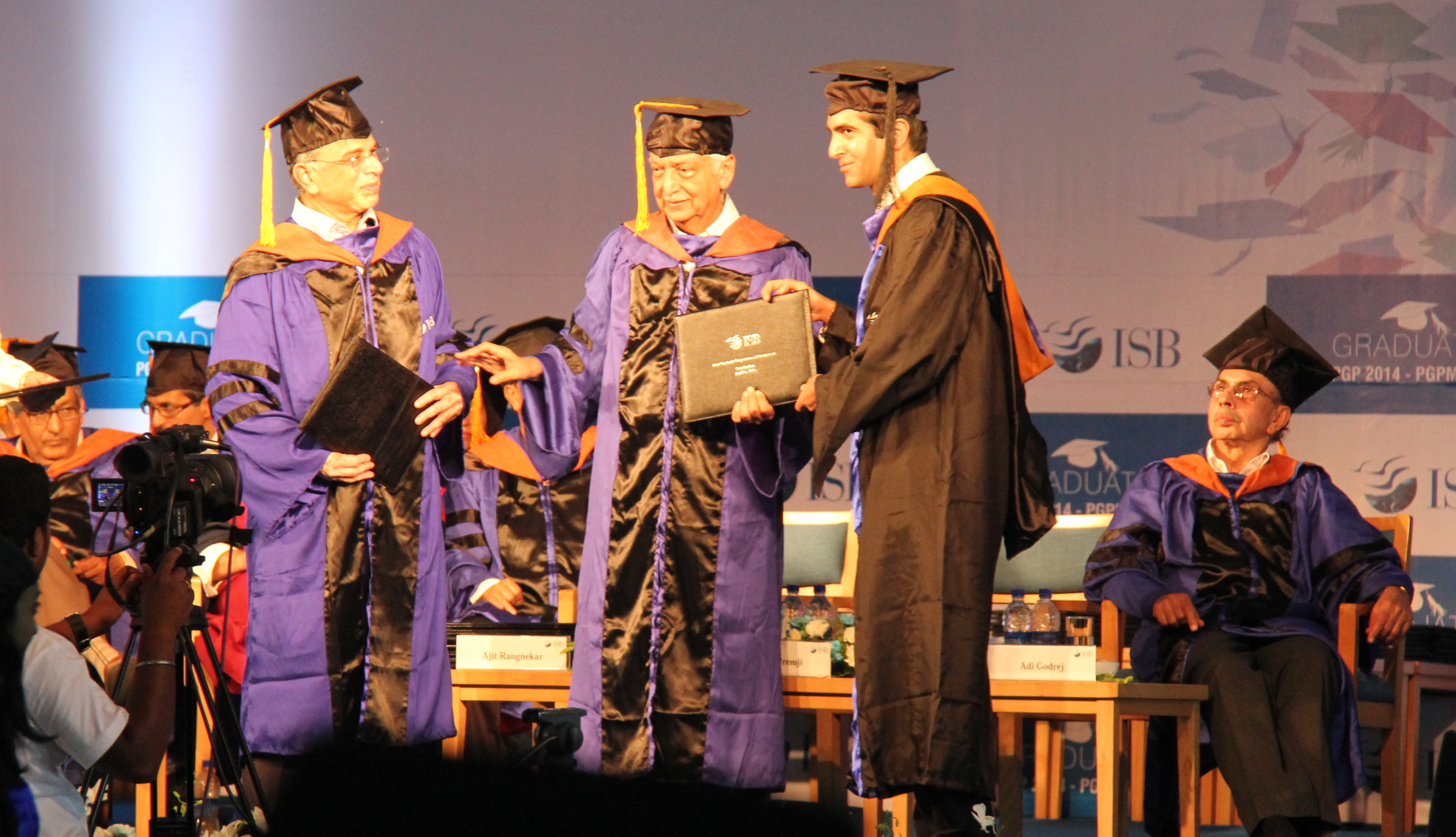
- Ajit Rangnekar awarding degrees to students with Azim Premji and Adi Godrej during Graduation ceremony in 2014.
- Education: Indian Institute of Technology, Bombay (Undergraduate); Indian Institute of Management, Ahmedabad (Post-graduate)
- Occupation: Former Dean of the Indian School of Business
- Known for: Leadership in business education

Rangnekar is the former Dean of the Indian School of Business (ranked by Financial Times as 34 in its 2013 ranking of the world's leading business schools). He was the Dean of the Indian School of Business (ISB) from January 2009 to 31 December 2015. In 2011, he was appointed as a director of Graduate Management Admission Council, the sole Indian on the team.

Prior to that, he held the position of Deputy Dean at the School from March 2003 to December 2008. Prior to ISB, he was the country head, first for Price Waterhouse Consulting and then for PwC Consulting, in Hong Kong and the Philippines. He was head of the telecom and entertainment industry consulting practice for PwC in East Asia (China to Indonesia). Rangnekar completed his undergraduate degree from the Indian Institute of Technology, Bombay, and his post-graduation in management from the Indian Institute of Management, Ahmedabad.
