= Calcutta Business School =

Business school in Kolkata, India

- Motto: creating, managing and leading successful
- Type: Private Business School
- Established: 2008; 18 years ago
- Affiliations: AICTE
- Principal: Dr. Anindiya Dutta
- Students: 120
- Location: Diamond Harbour Road, Bishnupur, South 24Parganas, Kolkata, West Bengal, India; 22.3905°N 88.2730°E
- Campus: Residential
- Website: www.calcuttabusinessschool.org

Calcutta Business School (CBS) is a business school near Kolkata, India. This college is an autonomous institute. The Post Graduate Diploma in Management (PGDM) program and Bachelor of Business Administration in Business & Data Analytics program of this college are approved by AICTE. It received the "Asia's fastest growing private educational institute" award in 2014.

== History ==
The college was founded in 1920 by Shikshayatan Foundation (formerly Marwari Balika Vidyalaya Society).

== Board of Governors ==
- Mr. S. K. Birla, Birla Brothers, Chairman, Director
- Mr. R. N. Jhunjhunwala, Attorney-at-Law, Khaitan and Company, Senior Partner
- Mr. B. D. Bose, Birla Brothers, Chairman, Director.
- Dr. Subir Chowdhury, Former Director, IIM Calcutta.
- Mr. R. S. Jhawar, Director, Williamson Magor Group.

== Collaborations ==
The school agreed to a memorandum of understanding (MOU) with The Bengal Chamber of Commerce & Industry in the field of education and training. The school used the Statistical Analysis System to allow for data research.
