= S. P. Kothari =

Indian-American economist

Prof. S.P. Kothari
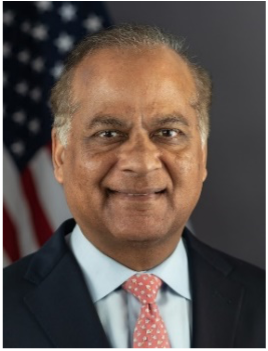
- Born: India
- Education: BITS, Pilani; IIM, Ahmedabad; University of Iowa
- Title: Gordon Y Billard Professor of Accounting and Finance
- Honours: Padma Shri (2020)

Sriprakash Kothari (born June 7, 1957), known as S. P. Kothari, is an Indian-American accounting and financial economics scholar and academic who serves as Assistant Secretary of the Treasury for Economic Policy. He is also Gordon Y Billard Professor of Accounting and Finance, Emeritus, at the MIT Sloan School of Management.

Kothari's academic research focuses on financial accounting, financial reporting, capital markets, asset pricing, corporate disclosure, executive compensation, and corporate finance. He previously served as chief economist and director of the Division of Economic and Risk Analysis at the U.S. Securities and Exchange Commission (SEC) from 2019 to 2021, deputy dean of MIT Sloan, and global head of equity research at Barclays Global Investors.

== Early life and education ==
Kothari was born in Gulbarga (now Kalaburagi), Karnataka, India. He earned a Bachelor of Engineering degree in chemical engineering from the Birla Institute of Technology and Science, Pilani in 1979, an MBA in accounting and finance from the Indian Institute of Management Ahmedabad in 1982, and a PhD in accounting from the University of Iowa in 1986.

== Career ==
=== Academic career ===
Kothari began his academic career at the University of Rochester in 1986. He became an associate professor in 1991 and a professor in 1996, serving as accounting area coordinator for much of his tenure. He joined MIT Sloan as a visiting professor in 1997 and became a professor there in 1999.

At MIT, Kothari served as head of the Department of Economics, Finance, and Accounting and as head of the Accounting Group. He was deputy dean of MIT Sloan from 2007 to 2008 and again from 2010 to 2015. He also served as director of the MIT-India Program.

Kothari was Thomas Henry Carroll-Ford Visiting Professor of Business Administration at Harvard Business School in 2005–2006. From 2008 to 2009, he was global head of equity research at Barclays Global Investors.

He became professor emeritus at MIT following his academic career there.

=== Government and industry ===
From 2019 to 2021, Kothari served as chief economist and director of the SEC's Division of Economic and Risk Analysis, where he oversaw economists and other specialists providing economic and financial analysis to the agency.

In 2025, he joined the United States Department of the Treasury as a senior adviser to Secretary Scott Bessent and was nominated to become Assistant Secretary for Economic Policy. The United States Senate confirmed his nomination on August 7, 2026. Kothari served on the board of directors of the Bombay Stock Exchange from 2015 to 2019.

== Research ==
Kothari's highly cited research spans the fields of accounting and financial economics. His research examines the relationship between accounting information and capital markets, including financial reporting, valuation, earnings, asset pricing, corporate disclosure, and earnings management. His 2001 review article, Capital Markets Research in Accounting, surveyed empirical research concerning the relationship between capital markets and financial statements, including market efficiency, fundamental analysis, and the value relevance of financial reporting.

His research on discretionary accruals with Andrew J. Leone and Charles E. Wasley examined methods for measuring discretionary accruals in studies of earnings management. With Susan Shu and Peter D. Wysocki, he also studied the timing of corporate disclosure of unfavorable information in the article Do Managers Withhold Bad News?.

Kothari has also published research in financial economics, including studies on event-study methodology, long-horizon security price performance, and the relationship between book-to-market ratios, dividend yields, and expected market returns. His publications include “Measuring Long-Horizon Security Price Performance,” co-authored with Jerold B. Warner and published in the Journal of Financial Economics in 1997, and “Book-to-Market, Dividend Yield, and Expected Market Returns: A Time-Series Analysis,” co-authored with Jay Shanken and published in the same journal that year. He also contributed a chapter on the econometrics of event studies to Handbook of Empirical Corporate Finance, edited by Espen Eckbo.

== Professional service ==
Kothari served as editor of the Journal of Accounting and Economics from 1997 to 2019 and previously served as an associate editor of the journal and of other accounting journals. He has also served in academic leadership and professional roles at MIT, the University of Rochester, and accounting and finance organizations.

== Honors ==
Kothari received the Padma Shri from the Government of India in 2020 for his contributions to finance and academia. He received the American Accounting Association's Notable Contributions to Accounting Literature Award in 2014 and was designated an AAA Presidential Scholar in 2017.

His other honors include honorary doctorates from the University of Technology Sydney, the University of Cyprus, and London Business School, as well as the Distinguished Alumnus Award from the University of Iowa and BITS Pilani.

In 2025, the Financial Accounting and Reporting Section of the American Accounting Association awarded Kothari its Lifetime Achievement Award. The award was presented in 2026. In 2026, he received the American Accounting Association's Outstanding Accounting Educator Award.

== Selected publications ==
- Collins, Daniel W.; Kothari, S.P.; Rayburn, Judy Dawson (1987). "Firm size and the information content of prices with respect to earnings". Journal of Accounting and Economics. 9 (2): 111–138. doi:10.1016/0165-4101(87)90002-4. ISSN 0165-4101.
- Kothari, S. P.; Shanken, Jay; Sloan, Richard G. (March 1995). "Another Look at the Cross-Section of Expected Stock Returns". The Journal of Finance. 50 (1): 185. doi:10.2307/2329243. ISSN 0022-1082. JSTOR 2329243.
- Kothari, S.P (September 2001). "Capital markets research in accounting". Journal of Accounting and Economics. 31 (1–3): 105–231. doi:10.1016/s0165-4101(01)00030-1. ISSN 0165-4101.
- Kothari, S.P.; Leone, Andrew J.; Wasley, Charles E. (February 2005). "Performance matched discretionary accrual measures". Journal of Accounting and Economics. 39 (1): 163–197. doi:10.1016/j.jacceco.2004.11.002. ISSN 0165-4101.
- Kothari, S.P.; Warner, Jerold B. (2007), "Econometrics of Event Studies**We thank Espen Eckbo, Jon Lewellen, Adam Kolasinski, and Jay Ritter for insightful comments, and Irfan Safdar and Alan Wancier for research assistance.", Handbook of Empirical Corporate Finance, Elsevier, pp. 3–36, doi:10.1016/b978-0-444-53265-7.50015-9, ISBN 978-0-444-53265-7
- KOTHARI, S. P.; SHU, SUSAN; WYSOCKI, PETER D. (16 January 2009). "Do Managers Withhold Bad News?". Journal of Accounting Research. 47 (1): 241–276. doi:10.1111/j.1475-679x.2008.00318.x. ISSN 0021-8456.
- DE FRANCO, GUS; KOTHARI, S.P.; VERDI, RODRIGO S. (20 April 2011). "The Benefits of Financial Statement Comparability". Journal of Accounting Research. 49 (4): 895–931. doi:10.1111/j.1475-679x.2011.00415.x. hdl:1721.1/65076. ISSN 0021-8456.
- KOTHARI, S. P.; WASLEY, CHARLES (25 September 2019). "Commemorating the 50-Year Anniversary of Ball and Brown (1968): The Evolution of Capital Market Research over the Past 50 Years". Journal of Accounting Research. 57 (5): 1117–1159. doi:10.1111/1475-679x.12287. hdl:1721.1/136485. ISSN 0021-8456.
