= Marti G. Subrahmanyam =

American business academic

- Education: IIT Madras, IIM Ahmedabad, MIT
- Awards: Anneliese Maier Research Award 2016
- Scientific career
- Fields: Finance
- Workplaces: Stern School of Business New York University
- Website: martisubrahmanyam.com

Marti G. Subrahmanyam is the Charles E. Merrill Professor of Finance at the Stern School of Business at New York University. He also holds a Global Network Professorship of Finance at NYU Shanghai.

== Biography ==
Professor Subrahmanyam holds a Ph.D. in finance and economics from the MIT Sloan School of Management, an MBA/PGDM from the Indian Institute of Management Ahmedabad, and a BTech in Mechanical Engineering from IIT Madras. Both IIT Madras and IIM Ahmedabad have recognised him with their Distinguished Alumnus Awards.

He has been teaching at the Stern School of Business since 1974 and has taught widely in executive programmes in more than twenty countries. He has also been a visiting professor at Goethe University Frankfurt (and the Leibniz Institute SAFE), the Einaudi Institute for Economics and Finance and LUISS Guido Carli in Rome, ESSEC Business School and INSEAD near Paris, IIT Madras and IIM Ahmedabad, London Business School, the University of Konstanz, the National University of Singapore and Singapore Management University, Churchill College, University of Cambridge, the Paris School of Economics, the University of Melbourne, and Università Ca’ Foscari, Venice.

=== Research and editorial work ===
Subrahmanyam's papers have been published in Econometrica, The Quarterly Journal of Economics, Journal of Economic Theory, the Journal of Finance, the Journal of Financial Economics and the Review of Financial Studies. Representative works include the survey “Credit Default Swaps: Past, Present, and Future” (2016) in the Annual Review of Financial Economics and the monograph Credit Default Swaps: A Survey (2014).

He currently serves or has served on the editorial boards of European Financial Management, the Journal of Banking & Finance, Journal of Business Finance & Accounting, the Journal of Finance, Management Science, the Journal of Derivatives, Journal of International Finance and Accounting, and Japan and the World Economy. He was the founding editor of the Review of Derivatives Research.

=== Honours and awards ===
He has received several teaching honours, including New York University’s Distinguished Teaching Medal. In 2016 he was awarded the Alexander von Humboldt Foundation’s Anneliese Maier Research Award; NYU notes that he was the first economist to be so honoured.

=== Industry, consulting and boards ===
Subrahmanyam has served as a consultant to businesses and has advised international and government organisations. He also advises start-ups in India and the United States and has acted as an expert witness in significant legal matters involving, among other topics, equity swaps and interest rate benchmarks.

He has served or is serving on the boards of AION India Investment Advisers (P) Ltd., Clayfin Technologies Ltd., ICICI Bank, ICICI Prudential Life Insurance, ICICI Venture Funds Management Company Limited, Infosys, Nomura Asset Management Inc., LIC Nomura Mutual Fund Asset Management Co. Ltd., Premier European Capital Ltd., and Vayana Enterprises (P) Ltd. Several of these entities are affiliates of global financial institutions including Deutsche Bank, JPMorgan Chase, Nomura Holdings and Apollo Global Management.

Subrahmanyam has served on the boards of the United Nations Foundation, the Indian School of Business, the Snow Leopard Trust and the IIT Madras Foundation.

== Works ==
- Financial Options: From Theory to Practice, Richard D Irwin, 1990. ISBN 1-55623-234-9, ISBN 978-1-55623-234-3
- Financial Risk and Derivatives, Springer, 1996. ISBN 0-7923-9801-7, ISBN 978-0-7923-9801-1.
- Derivative Valuation & Hedging a Trade: A Trader's Perspective, John Wiley & Sons, 2002. ISBN 0-471-16397-X, ISBN 978-0-471-16397-8.
- Patrick Augustin; Marti G. Subrahmanyam; Dragon Yongjun Tang; Sarah Qian Wang. Credit Default Swaps: A Survey. Foundations and Trends in Finance, 2014. doi:10.1561/0500000040.
