= Harbir Singh =

American economist

Harbir Singh is an American economist, currently the Co-Director, Mack Institute for Innovation Management and Mack Professor of Management at Wharton School of the University of Pennsylvania and formerly the Edward H. Bowman Professor, from 1999 to 2005.

== Bibliography ==
- Harbir Singh; Michael Useem (2016). The Strategic Leader's Roadmap: 6 Steps for Integrating Leadership and Strategy. Wharton Digital Press. ISBN 978-1-61363-076-1.
- Peter Cappelli; Harbir Singh; Jitendra Singh; Michael Useem (2010). The India Way: How India's Top Business Leaders are Revolutionizing Management. Harvard Business Press. ISBN 978-1-4221-4759-7.
