= Ravi J. Matthai =

Indian academic

Ravi Matthai

Ravi John Matthai (1927–1984) was an educationist and a professor and the first full-time Director of the Indian Institute of Management, Ahmedabad. He is also the co-founder, along with Dr. K. Varghese, of Institute of Rural Management, Anand.

== Early life, education ==
Matthai was born to a Syrian Anglican family in Kerala as the son of John Mathai, who served as India's first Railway Minister and subsequently as India's Finance Minister. The 'Father of the White Revolution' Verghese Kurien is his cousin.

He was educated at The Doon School, Dehradun and later graduated from University of Oxford with Bachelor of Arts (Hons.) in Economics. He began his career at MacNeill & Baryy Limited, a Calcutta based firm with interests in coal, tea, shipping, jute, and cotton. Later, he moved to the Indian Institute of Management Calcutta in 1963 as Professor of Marketing. He also worked for a year as a Visiting Professor at the Massachusetts Institute of Technology.

== Influence on IIM Ahmedabad [IIMA] after leaving IIM Calcutta ==
In 1965 Matthai was invited by noted Indian Institution builder and scientist Dr. Vikram Sarabhai to join IIMA as its first full-time Director. He was 38 years old at the time and did not have an advanced academic degree. Yet, over the next six years, he set the foundations for an institution that was to grow into a top-ranking management school in India.

A number of reasons are attributed to Matthai's enduring influence on IIMA:

- First, a clear sense of purpose. IIMA's concern, as Mathai put it, was "with the application of knowledge". This meant that the Institute would be involved in teaching, research and consulting. The impact "would be greatest if it were the combined result of all activities", so faculty must engage in all three activities. Matthai saw clearly that to focus merely on business would limit IIMA. It would also expose it to charges of being elitist in its orientation. IIMA's ambit needed to be wider: it would be an institute of management, not just a business school. It would develop expertise in important sectors, including agriculture.
- Secondly, Matthai's conviction that academic activities can flourish only when faculty are given the fullest freedom. In an academic institution, excellence cannot be ordered. It springs forth when people are given the space to grow and to express themselves freely.
- Thirdly, the idea of a faculty-governed institute where decision-making rests primarily with the faculty and not with the director or the board. An example is the admissions committee that is independent of the director. The mechanism has been crucial in insulating admissions from unhealthy influence.
- Fourthly, what is, perhaps, Matthai's greatest bequest to IIMA: the principle of a single term for the director.

After six years as director, Matthai announced his decision to step down and stay on as professor. He gave two reasons for doing so:first, leaders of academic institutions tended to use their positions for career advancement at an adverse cost to the institutions;secondly, it was important to establish the principle that the director's position is not hierarchical; he is only first among equals, which was characteristically bold of him, given the cultural milieu prevailing in leading academic institutions at that time.

== The Jawaja Experiment ==
In 1975, a few years after stepping down from IIMA's directorship, Matthai decided to test whether corporate management disciplines could be related to gut issues of Indian poverty. He selected Jawaja block which included about 200 villages with a population of approximately 80,000 people in a drought prone district of Rajasthan. The area was then regarded by the government authorities as devoid of any scope for development. Believing that people were the greatest resource for development, Matthai began to work with village communities on issues of livelihood and empowerment in an environment that was (and still remains) among India's most degraded and oppressive. Volunteers from IIMA and the National Institute of Design (NID) joined with local citizens in the search for livelihood options that could be sustained in the face of social, environmental and political challenges. Among them was Raaj Sah, subsequently Professor at the University of Chicago, who worked on the project during and after his MBA studies at IIMA. Among his contributions were that Ravi Matthai and he together were the first on the ground and, starting from nothing, they began structuring and implementing the work of poverty alleviation.

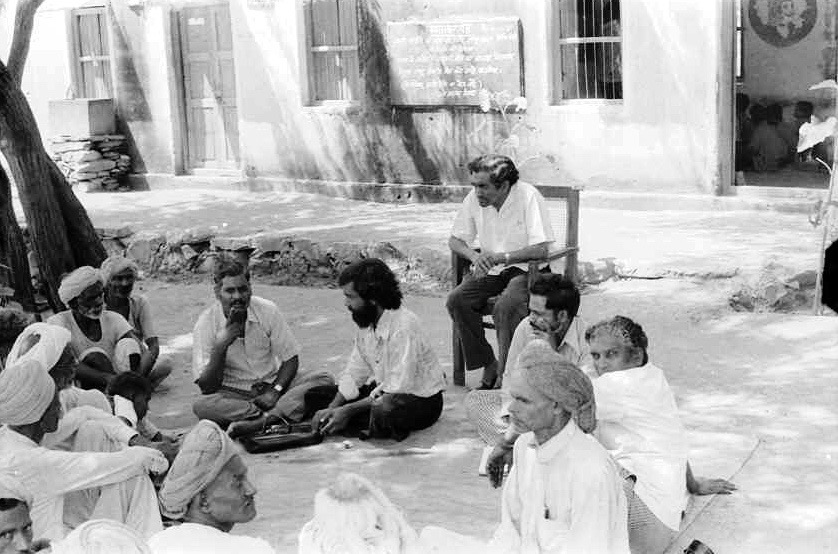
Ravi Matthai (on the chair) and Raaj Sah (with beard and long hair) with villagers in Jawaja, 1975.

Languishing skills in weaving and leather work were selected in an effort to develop new opportunities for earning that could be outside the control of local vested interests while remaining rooted in familiar and tested capacities. The Jawaja Experiment thus began with Prof. Ravi Matthai leading a small group of volunteers to a barren patch of land with little resources. Today, the Jawaja Leather Association and the Jawaja Weaver's Association, linked as AAJ, continue their struggle for self-reliance and dignity. The leather workers and weavers have won a degree of economic independence. Their products are reputed in India and in many parts of the world.

This experiential learning of running a gross root development project, led to the setting up of the Institute of Rural Management, Anand. Ravi Mathai, and two of his former IIMA colleagues, Kamala Chowdhary and Michael Halse are credited with conceptualising the need for an independent Institute of Rural Management. The institute was established in Anand, at the express invitation of Verghese Kurien, his cousin, then Chairman of the National Dairy Development Board.

The National Institute of Design (NID) at Paldi, Ahmedabad, has a Ravi J Matthai Design Research Chair for 'design innovation for enriching school education, craft sectors and design research'. It focuses on developing a range of design research related projects and activities in this area.

The institute library at the Institute of Rural Management, Anand and the Centre for Educational Innovation at IIM Ahmedabad are named after him.

In 1986, IIMA established the Ravi J. Matthai Centre for Educational Innovation (RJMCEI), to conduct research and undertake training activities to influence the management of education systems in India.
