= Anil Kumar Gupta =

Indian academic

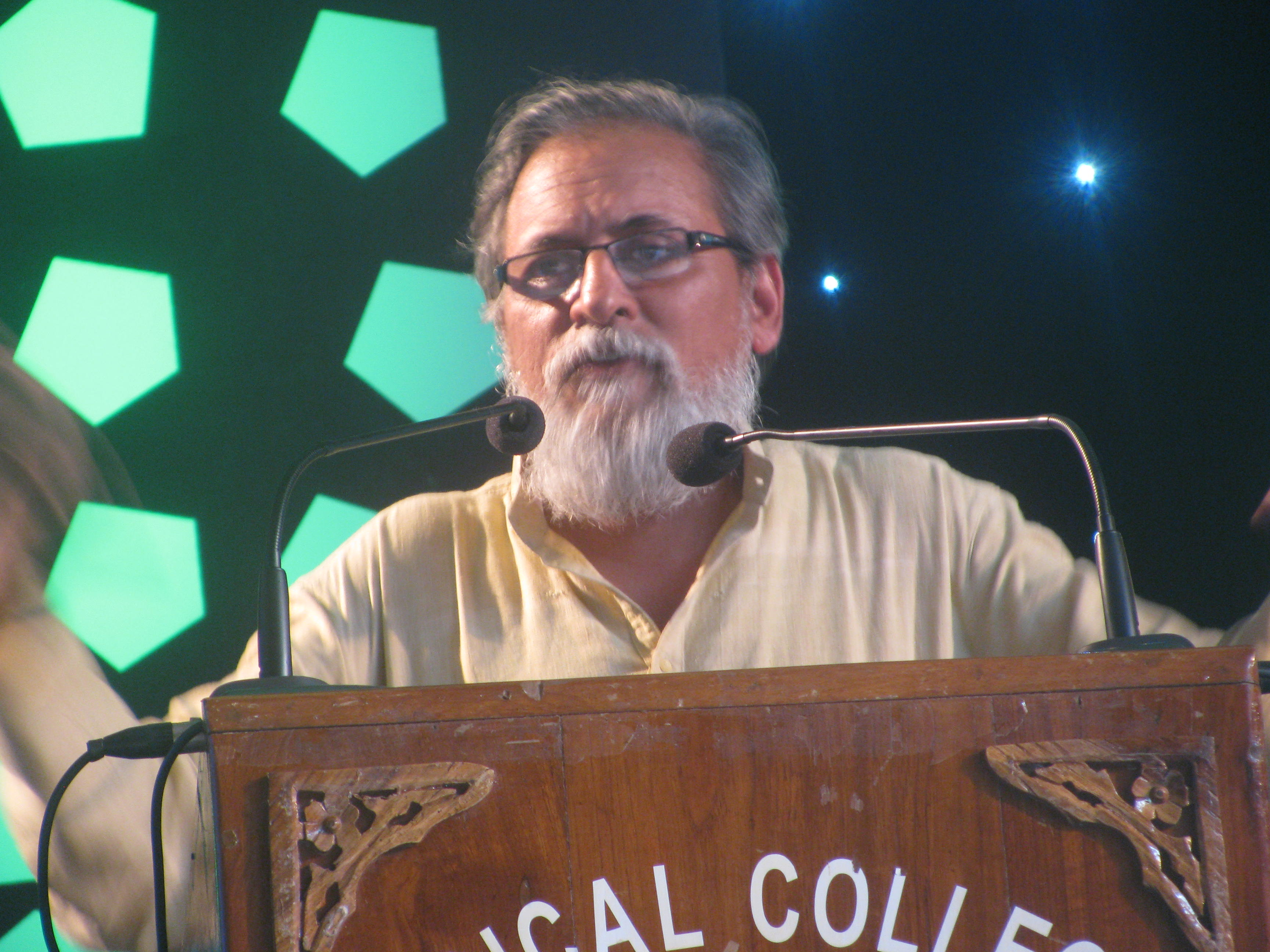
Gupta addressing at Government Medical College, Thiruvananthapuram

Anil Kumar Gupta is an Indian scholar in the area of grassroots innovations. He is the founder of the Honey Bee Network. He retired as a full-time professor at the Indian Institute of Management, Ahmedabad in 2017, where he served for about 36 years.

He was a member of the governing board at the National Innovation Foundation. He is also a fellow of the World Academy of Art and Science. He was awarded the Padma Shri in 2004 for his contributions to management education.

Gupta has developed courses for students at the Indian Institute of Management, Ahmedabad. One of his most popular courses included Shodh Yatra, (meaning 'research walk'), under which he took management students to different parts of the country to learn from local communities and study their knowledge systems. This course was derived from his larger concept of walking through the length and breadth of the country, interacting with farmers, traditional knowledge holders, grassroots innovators, innovative students, etc. It started in May 1998 in the western Indian province of Gujarat.

== Education ==
Upon finishing his bachelor's degree (Hons) in Agriculture, he went on to complete his master's degree in Sciences (Biochemical Genetics) from Haryana Agricultural University in 1974. In 1986, he earned a Ph.D. in management from the Kurukshetra University.

== Research ==
He authored the book, "Grassroots Innovation: Minds On The Margin Are Not Marginal Minds" published by Penguin India, which details his work with the Honey Bee Network. The book won the Best Business Book Award at the Tata Literature Live! Festival in 2018. He is Honorary Secretary of GIAN (Gujarat Grassroots Innovation Augmentation Network) and Co-Ordinator of SRISTI (Society for Research and Initiative for Sustainable Technologies and Institutions). He was a speaker at TED India in November 2009. Since 2011, he is an advisor on issues pertaining to innovation, environment, and sustainability to Fair Observer, an online magazine covering global issues.. He has an H Index 31 on Google scholar as of November 2026 (Source https://scholar.google.com/citations?user=NunmnJ0AAAAJ&hl=en )

== Awards and honours ==
Year of award or honour	Name of award or honour	Awarding organisation
2004	Padma Shri National Award (management education)	Government of India
2004	Science-in-Society Award	Indian Science Congress Association
2000	Asian Innovation Award Gold	Far Eastern Economic Review
1993 - 96	Pew Conservation Scholar Award	University of Michigan, USA.
