= T. V. Rao =

Dr. T. V. Rao
- Born: 14 March 1946 (age 80); Andhra Pradesh, India
- Occupations: Professor, management consultant, author, speaker
- Website: tvrao.weebly.com

T.V. Rao (born 14 March 1946) is an Indian Human Resources Development professional.

A new Human Resource Development system emerged in India in 1974 with Dr. T.V. Rao and Dr. Udai Pareek heading the movement. It was started as a "Review Exercise of the Performance Appraisal System" for Larsen & Toubro by the duo from the Indian Institute of Management, Ahmedabad (IIMA) which resulted in the development of a new function – The Human Resources Development Function. Rao and Dr Udai Pareek were instrumental in setting up the HRD Department for L&T and making it the first company in this part of the world to have fully Dedicated HRD Department.

As HRD started growing Larsen & Toubro instituted a HRD Chair Professorship at XLRI, Jamshedpur. Between 1983 and 1985, Dr. T.V. Rao moved to XLRI as L&T Professor to set up the Centre for HRD. While returning to IIMA from XLRI after setting up the CHRD, Dr. Rao conceptualized along with Fr. E. Abraham a Professional body which was later registered as the National HRD Network. Dr. Rao became the Founder President of the National HRD Network and was also President of the Indian Society for Applied Behavioural Sciences (ISABS) 1986-89. Rao had worked as a professor at the premier management institute of India – the IIM, Ahmedabad from 1973 – 1994. After leaving the IIMA, he started working for the Academy of Human Resources Development which was set up with support from RMCEI of IIMA. He worked as its Honorary Director for some time.

During the last three decades, Rao has been popularizing the methodology of "Developing Leadership through Feedback by Known People" (DLFKP), which he developed in the mid 1980s at IIMA and worked on it along with Prof. P. N. Khandwalla, J.P. Singh and S. Ramnarayan. This methodology is later termed by other specialists as 360 degree feedback methodology. To popularize this methodology as a development tool, he has started a 360 degree feedback club and has also conducted over hundreds of workshops in the last 30 years in India, Thailand, Philippines, Nigeria, Sri Lanka and Egypt. Currently, he is developing HRD Auditors and Trainers of Development Centers and creating manuals for HRD Audit in an effort to make HRD Audit like ISO certification. The HR Score Card as known today was created by him much before it was published from the US. Rao also worked as a visiting faculty at ISB Hyderabad and IIM Ranchi earlier.

== Professional career ==
Rao is currently Chairman, of TVRLS, Ahmedabad. He was professor at the Indian Institute of Management, Ahmedabad for over 20 years beginning 1973. While at IIMA he was Chairman of the Post Graduate Program, Fellow Program, Public Systems Group, Ravi Matthai Center and also coordinated the PGP review. He left in 1994 to serve as Honorary Director of the Academy of Human Resources Development. He set up TVRLS in 1996, two years after he left IIMA.

He was a Visiting Professor since then and adjunct professor at IIMA since 2006 and until 2014. He was on the Board of IIMA from 2014 to 2018. Rao has also contributed majorly in the field of competency mapping and defines competency mapping as the process of identification of the competencies required to perform successfully at a given point of time. He worked with David McClelland of Harvard University (the initiator of the competency movement) and had joint research projects with him in seventies. Rao was a Visiting Faculty at the Indian Business School, Hyderabad and as HRD Advisor to the Reserve Bank of India. Dr Rao assisted the Administrative Reforms Commission in reviewing the personnel management practices for civil services, and also served as member of the HRM Review Committee of Nationalised Banks set up by the Ministry of Finance in 2009–2010.

Rao's consulting work is in the areas of designing and managing HRD systems of various corporations in India and other Asian countries. He assisted a number of Organizations on various HR themes. Dr.Rao's consulting experience includes agencies like the USAID, UNESCO, UNIDO, UNICEF, FAO, Commonwealth Secretariat, London; World Bank, Action Aid, Swiss Agency for Development Cooperation, ICOMP etc. and various corporations like Alexandria Carbon Black, Gulfar, CHR Oman, Commercial Bank, Kewalram Chanrai Group, Indorama Synthetics, Thai Carbon Black, etc. and covers countries including the US, Mexico, UK, Netherlands, Egypt, Nigeria, Sri Lanka, Bangladesh, Singapore, Malaysia, Indonesia, Thailand, Philippines, Gulf countries, South Africa etc. Rao has authored or coauthored or edited over 60 books dealing with HRD, Education Management, Health and Population Management, Entrepreneurship Development among others.

== Publications ==
Rao's Leadership Development methodology started in mid-eighties using what is later termed in the USA as 360 Degree Feedback. And HRD audit methodology leading to HRD Score card 2500 are first of its kind in this part of the world Rao has authored or coauthored or edited over fifty books dealing with Organizational Behavior, HRD, Education Management, Health and Population Management, Entrepreneurship Development etc.

Books by Dr. T. V. Rao
EDUCATION	Institutionalization of Innovations in Education; Ahmedabad: Swiss Agency for Development Cooperation & TVRLS, 1999 (With Jaya Indiresan and M G Jomon)
EDUCATION	Changing Teacher Behaviour through Feedback; Hyderabad: ICFAI, 2006, (With Udai Pareek)
EDUCATION	Training for Education Managers; New Delhi: Macmillan, 2005 (With Udai Pareek)
EDUCATION	Institution Building in Education and Research: From Stagnation to Self-Renewal, (Eds. R.J. Matthai, Udai Pareek and T.V. Rao), All Indian Management Association, New Delhi, 1977
EDUCATION	Adult Education for Social Change; Manohar Publications, New Delhi, 1980 (co-author with Anil Bhat and T P Rama Rao)
EDUCATION	Handbook for Trainers in Educational Management with special reference to Asia and Pacific; UNESCO, Bangkok (Co-author with Udai Pareek) 1981
EDUCATION	Management Processes in Universities; New Delhi: Oxford & IBH (PSG Monograph 1, Indian Institute of Management, Ahmedabad 1978, co-author with R.J. Matthai and Udai Pareek published later by Oxford & IBH)
EDUCATION	Doctors in Making; Sahitya Mudranalaya, Ahmedabad, 1976
ENTREPRENEURSHIP AND ENTREPRENEURIAL DEVELOPMENT	Designing Entrepreneurial Skills Development Programmes; London, Commonwealth Secretariat, 1990 (co-author)
ENTREPRENEURSHIP AND ENTREPRENEURIAL DEVELOPMENT	Developing Entrepreneurship: A Handbook for Policy Makers, Entrepreneurs, Trainers and Development Personnel; Learning Systems, New Delhi, 1978 (co-author with Udai Pareek)
ENTREPRENEURSHIP AND ENTREPRENEURIAL DEVELOPMENT	Identification and selection of Entrepreneurs; (Eds. T.V. Rao and T.K. Moulik), Indian Institute of Management, Ahmedabad, 1979
ENTREPRENEURSHIP AND ENTREPRENEURIAL DEVELOPMENT	Entrepreneurial Skill Development Programmes in Fifteen Commonwealth Countries: An Overview. Commonwealth Secretariat, London, 1991, W.P. No. 2014-03-14 Page No. 33
ENTREPRENEURSHIP AND ENTREPRENEURIAL DEVELOPMENT	Entrepreneurship: A South Asian Perspective by D. F. Kuratko and T. V. Rao, New Delhi, Cengage Learning, 2017
HEALTH AND POPULATION & GENERAL MANAGEMENT	100 Managers in Action: New Delhi: Tata McGraw-Hill, 2012 (with Charu Sharma)
HEALTH AND POPULATION & GENERAL MANAGEMENT	Sales Styles Diagnosis Exercises; Learning Systems, New Delhi, 1976
HEALTH AND POPULATION & GENERAL MANAGEMENT	Behavioural Sciences Research in Family Planning; Tata McGraw Hill, New Delhi, 1974 (co-author with Udai Pareek)4. Managing Family Planning Clinics; Asian and Pacific Development Administration Centre, Kaula Lumpur, Malaysia, 1977 (co-author)
HEALTH AND POPULATION & GENERAL MANAGEMENT	Change Agents in Family Welfare: An Action Research in Organized Industry; Academic Book Centre, Ahmedabad, 1978 (co-author with Pramod Verma)
HUMAN RESOURCES DEVELOPMENT	Life after 360 Degree Feedback and Assessment and Development Centres; Editors T. V. Rao, Nandini Chawla and S. Ramnarayan): New Delhi: Excel Books, 2010
HUMAN RESOURCES DEVELOPMENT	HR Best Practices; New Delhi: Steel Authority of India (jointly with Nisha Nair, Neharika Vohra, and Atul Srivastava), 2009
HUMAN RESOURCES DEVELOPMENT	HRD Score Card 2500; New Delhi: Sage, Response Books, 2008
HUMAN RESOURCES DEVELOPMENT	Hurconomics; New Delhi: Oxford & IBH, 2008 Republished by Pearson Education: New Delhi, 2011
HUMAN RESOURCES DEVELOPMENT	The Power of 360 Degree Feedback; (Jointly with Mr. Raju Rao), New Delhi: Response Books, Sage, 2005. (Won Two awards as best Management book of the Year: DMA and ISTD)
HUMAN RESOURCES DEVELOPMENT	The Power of 360 Degree Feedback; The India Way for Leadership Effectiveness, (Jointly with Mr. Raju Rao), New Delhi: Response Books, Sage, 2014 second edition
HUMAN RESOURCES DEVELOPMENT	The Future of HRD; New Delhi: Macmillan India, 2003
HUMAN RESOURCES DEVELOPMENT	HRD in Asia: First Asian Research Conference on HRD; (jointly with Ramnarayan, Udai Pareek, AAhad Usman Gani) Academy of HRD, New Delhi: Oxford and IBH, 2003
HUMAN RESOURCES DEVELOPMENT	HRD Audit; New Delhi, Response Books, Sage Publications, 1999
HUMAN RESOURCES DEVELOPMENT	HRD Audit; New Delhi, Response Books, Sage Publications Second Edition 2014
HUMAN RESOURCES DEVELOPMENT	360 Degree Feedback and Assessment & Development Centers; (edited by T V Rao and Nandini Chawla) New Delhi: Excel Publications, 2005, W.P. No. 2014-03-14 Page No. 34
HUMAN RESOURCES DEVELOPMENT	Performance Planning and Review Manuals; Ahmedabad: TVRLS, 2005
HUMAN RESOURCES DEVELOPMENT	HR @ Heart of Business; (edited by TV Rao, A Gangopadhyay, RSS Mani), New Delhi: Excel Publications, 2002
HUMAN RESOURCES DEVELOPMENT	Performance Management and Appraisal Systems; New Delhi: Response Books, 2004
HUMAN RESOURCES DEVELOPMENT	Performance Management: Towards Organizational Excellence: Sage Response Books, Second Edition, 2016
HUMAN RESOURCES DEVELOPMENT	360 Degree Feedback and Performance Management Systems; (Editors T V Rao, Gopal Mahapatra, Raju Rao and Nandini Chawla) Volume 2, Excel Publications: New Delhi 2002
HUMAN RESOURCES DEVELOPMENT	360-degree Feedback and Performance Management systems Volume 1; (Editors: T V OD
HUMAN RESOURCES DEVELOPMENT	Pioneering Human Resources Development: The L&T System; Ahmedabad, Academy of HRD, 1998 (Co-author)
HUMAN RESOURCES DEVELOPMENT	Redesigning Performance Appraisal System; 1996, Tata McGraw Hill, New Delhi
HUMAN RESOURCES DEVELOPMENT	Human Resources Development: Experiences, Interventions Strategies; 1996, Sage Publications, New Delhi
HUMAN RESOURCES DEVELOPMENT	Performance Appraisal and Review: Trainers Manual, Operating Manual and Skills Workbook; Learning Systems, New Delhi, 1978
HUMAN RESOURCES DEVELOPMENT	Designing and Managing Human Resources Systems; Oxford & IBH Publications, New Delhi, 1981, 1991, 2003 (Co-author) (This book has won ESCORTS award as best management book in 1982)
HUMAN RESOURCES DEVELOPMENT	Performance Appraisal: Theory and Practice; AIMA-Vikas Management Series, New Delhi, 1984 (Also translated into Bhasha Indonesia by PPM, Jakarta)
HUMAN RESOURCES DEVELOPMENT	Recent Experiences in Human Resources Development; Oxford and IBH, New Delhi (edited by T.V. Rao and D.F. Pereira)
HUMAN RESOURCES DEVELOPMENT	Alternative Approaches and Strategies of HRD; (edited by T.V. Rao, K.K. Verma, E. Abraham, and A. Khandelwal), Rawat Publications, Jaipur, 1987
HUMAN RESOURCES DEVELOPMENT	Excellence Through Human Resource Development; (editors M.R.R. Nair and T.V. Rao), New Delhi, Tata McGraw Hill, 1990
HUMAN RESOURCES DEVELOPMENT	The HRD Missionary; New Delhi, Oxford and IBH, 1990 (Second edition: 2009, 2018 TVRLS)
HUMAN RESOURCES DEVELOPMENT	Readings in HRD; New Delhi, Oxford and IBH, 1991
HUMAN RESOURCES DEVELOPMENT	Career Planning and Promotion Policies; Ahmedabad, Academy of HRD, 1982 (co-author)
HUMAN RESOURCES DEVELOPMENT	Appraising & Developing Managerial Performance; AHRD Publication, 1996, reprinted at New Delhi: Excel Books, 1999
HUMAN RESOURCES DEVELOPMENT	HRD Philosophies and Concepts: The Indian Perspective; Ahmedabad: Academy of HRD, 1994 (with Abraham, E & Nair, Baburaj V. Eds.)
HUMAN RESOURCES DEVELOPMENT	Selected Readings in HRD; New Delhi: Tata McGraw Hill, 1998 (with Singh, Kuldeep & Nair, Baburaj)
HUMAN RESOURCES DEVELOPMENT	HRD in the New economic Environment; New Delhi: Tata McGraw Hill, 1994 (co-edited with Silveira, D. M., Srivastava, C. M. and Vidyasagar, Rajesh)
ORGANIZATIONAL BEHAVIOUR AND OD AND INSTITUTION BUILDING	Nurturing Excellence: Indian Institute of Management, New Delhi: Macmillan, (Co-authored with Vijaya Sherry Chand, 2011)
ORGANIZATIONAL BEHAVIOUR AND OD AND INSTITUTION BUILDING	Managers who Make a Difference: New Delhi: IIMA Book Series, 2010 Random House
ORGANIZATIONAL BEHAVIOUR AND OD AND INSTITUTION BUILDING	Organizational Renewal in NGOs: Experiences and Cases; (Co-author with Uma Jain), Hyderabad: Academy of HRD, 1996
ORGANIZATIONAL BEHAVIOUR AND OD AND INSTITUTION BUILDING	Organization Development: Interventions and Strategies; (Co edited with S Ramnaryan and Kuldeep Singh), New Delhi: 1998, New Delhi: Response Books
ORGANIZATIONAL BEHAVIOUR AND OD AND INSTITUTION BUILDING	Organization Development: Accelerating Learning and Transformation(Co edited with S Ramnaryan as first author), New Delhi: Second edition, 2011, Response Books
ORGANIZATIONAL BEHAVIOUR AND OD AND INSTITUTION BUILDING	Developing Motivation Through Experiencing; Oxford and IBH Publications, 1982 (co-author with Udai Pareek)
ORGANIZATIONAL BEHAVIOUR AND OD AND INSTITUTION BUILDING	Handbook of Psychological and Instruments; Samasthi Publications, Baroda, 1974 (co-author)
ORGANIZATIONAL BEHAVIOUR AND OD AND INSTITUTION BUILDING	Behaviour Processes in Organizations; Oxford and IBH Publications, New Delhi, 1981 (Co-author with Udai Pareek and D M Pestonjee)
ORGANIZATIONAL BEHAVIOUR AND OD AND INSTITUTION BUILDING	Measuring and Managing Organizational Climate; Ahmadabad: Academy of HRD, 1996 (With Dalpat Sarupriya and Dr. Sethumadhavan)
ORGANIZATIONAL BEHAVIOUR AND OD AND INSTITUTION BUILDING	Effective People; by T. V. Rao, Random House, 2015
ORGANIZATIONAL BEHAVIOUR AND OD AND INSTITUTION BUILDING	HRD, OD and Institution Building: Essays in the Memory of Udai Pareek • Edited by T V Rao & Anil Khandelwal; 2016; Sage
ORGANIZATIONAL BEHAVIOUR AND OD AND INSTITUTION BUILDING	Leaders in the Making: Crucibles of Change Makers in HR, Penguin Random House (Arvind Agrawal and T. V. Rao, August, 2022)

== Awards ==
Awards and Accolades
1.	Asia Pacific Professional of the Year 2019 by the Asia Pacific federation for HRM Associations, Taipei, Taiwan
2.	Life Time Achievement Award by the Indian Academy of Management, 2020
3.	Ravi Matthai Fellow by the Association of Indian Management Schools
