= Indian Institute of Management Ahmedabad =

Business school in India

- Bhāratīya Prabandh Sansthān Ahmadābād
- Motto: Vidyā-vinayogād-vikāsaḥ (Sanskrit)
- Motto in English: Progress Through the Application of Knowledge
- Type: Public Business School
- Established: 11 December 1961; 64 years ago
- Founders: Vikram Sarabhai (Founder); Kasturbhai Lalbhai, Jivraj Mehta (Co-Founders)
- Accreditation: EQUIS
- Endowment: ₹114 crore (US$12 million) (2023-24)
- Budget: ₹420.15 crore (US$44 million) (2023-24)
- Chairman: Pankaj Patel
- Director: Bharat Bhasker
- Academic staff: 111
- Students: 1,013
- Postgraduates: 879
- Doctoral students: 134
- Location: Ahmedabad, Gujarat, 380015, India; 23°01′54″N 72°32′10″E
- Campus: 102 acres (0.41 km^{2}); Urban
- Website: www.iima.ac.in

Map with new campus on west

The Indian Institute of Management Ahmedabad (IIM Ahmedabad or IIMA) is a public business school in Ahmedabad, Gujarat, India. Established on 11 December 1961, it is the second-oldest of the Indian Institutes of Management and was declared an Institute of National Importance under the Indian Institutes of Management Act, 2017.

The institute was founded by Vikram Sarabhai and Kasturbhai Lalbhai with support from the Government of India, the Government of Gujarat and the Ford Foundation, and was set up in collaboration with Harvard Business School. It offers a two-year Master of Business Administration, an MBA in food and agri-business management, and executive and doctoral programmes. Admission to the flagship MBA is through the Common Admission Test.

Established in 1961, the institute offers master's degree programs in management and agri-business management, a doctoral programme in management, a full-time one-year postgraduate programme for working professionals, a hybrid two-year MBA degree programme for working professionals and entrepreneurs, a two-year blended MBA in Business Analytics and Artificial Intelligence, a six-month residential programme for the armed forces, a faculty development programme, and a number of executive training programs. The institute was founded by Vikram Sarabhai and Kasturbhai Lalbhai, with Ravi J. Matthai. serving as its first director. Other notable contributors included Kamla Chowdhary. In September 2025 the institute opened its first campus outside India, in Dubai.

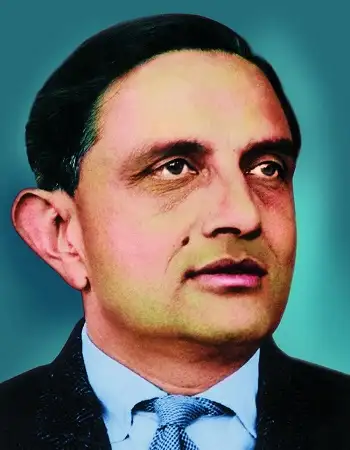
Vikram Sarabhai, the Honorary Director of IIMA.

== History ==
IIM Ahmedabad was established on 11 December 1961 with the active support of the Government of India, the Government of Gujarat, Harvard Business School, and prominent members of Indian industry. The physicist Vikram Sarabhai and businessman Kasturbhai Lalbhai, both natives of Ahmedabad, played pivotal roles in setting up the institute. Ravi J. Matthai and several other Ahmedabad-based businessmen also played a major role in its creation. Kamla Chowdhary was the first faculty of the institute, and the coordinator of programmes between 1962 and 1965.

The institute offers master's degree programs in management and agri-business management, a fellowship program and a number of executive training programs. The institute's founding director was Ravi J. Matthai. Other notable founding figures were the Indian physicist Vikram Sarabhai, Indian businessman Kasturbhai Lalbhai and Indian educator Kamla Chowdhary.

In 2015, the JSW School of Public Policy was established with a financial contribution from JSW Steel Ltd worth Rs. 50 crore, the school is engaged in research on policy formulation and design, policy choice, and policy impact.

In 2024, it was ranked first among business schools in India by the National Institutional Ranking Framework.

== Campus ==
IIM Ahmedabad's original grounds, which the institute refers to as its heritage campus, were designed by the American architect Louis Kahn between 1962 and 1974. Kahn was introduced to the project through the National Institute of Design and the architect B. V. Doshi, after Vikram Sarabhai and Kasturbhai Lalbhai sought an architect who could give the new institute a building on the scale of Le Corbusier's work elsewhere in Ahmedabad. Kahn's design used exposed, locally made red brick, reinforced concrete slabs, lintels and beams, and repeated circular and arched openings, arranged around courtyards and covered walkways meant to draw academic life outside the classroom. The heritage campus, covering about 25 hectares, includes the Louis Kahn Plaza, faculty offices, a library, academic blocks and dormitories built between 1962 and 1974; after Kahn's death in 1974, the architect Anant Raje, who had worked with Kahn, continued to oversee construction until 2000. Restoration of the library building was carried out by the firm Somaya & Kalappa Consultants and received an Award of Distinction in the 2019 UNESCO Asia-Pacific Awards for Cultural Heritage Conservation.

=== Restoration and demolition dispute ===
A structural conservation programme for the Kahn-designed buildings began in 2014, led by Somaya & Kalappa Consultants, who first produced measured drawings and condition surveys before beginning repair work on load-bearing brick walls, arches and terraces. In December 2020, the institute told alumni it planned to demolish 14 of the campus's 18 dormitory blocks and rebuild them, citing structural deterioration that made the buildings unsafe for continued use. The plan drew objections from architects, historians and conservation bodies, including the International Council on Monuments and Sites and, later, the Society of Architectural Historians, as well as from members of Kahn's family, who argued the dormitories could be restored using the methods already applied to the library. Following the criticism, IIMA's board of governors said in January 2021 that it had withdrawn the demolition plan, though some observers noted the institute did not commit in writing to a conservation-only approach.

== IIMA Ventures (formerly known as CIIE.CO) ==
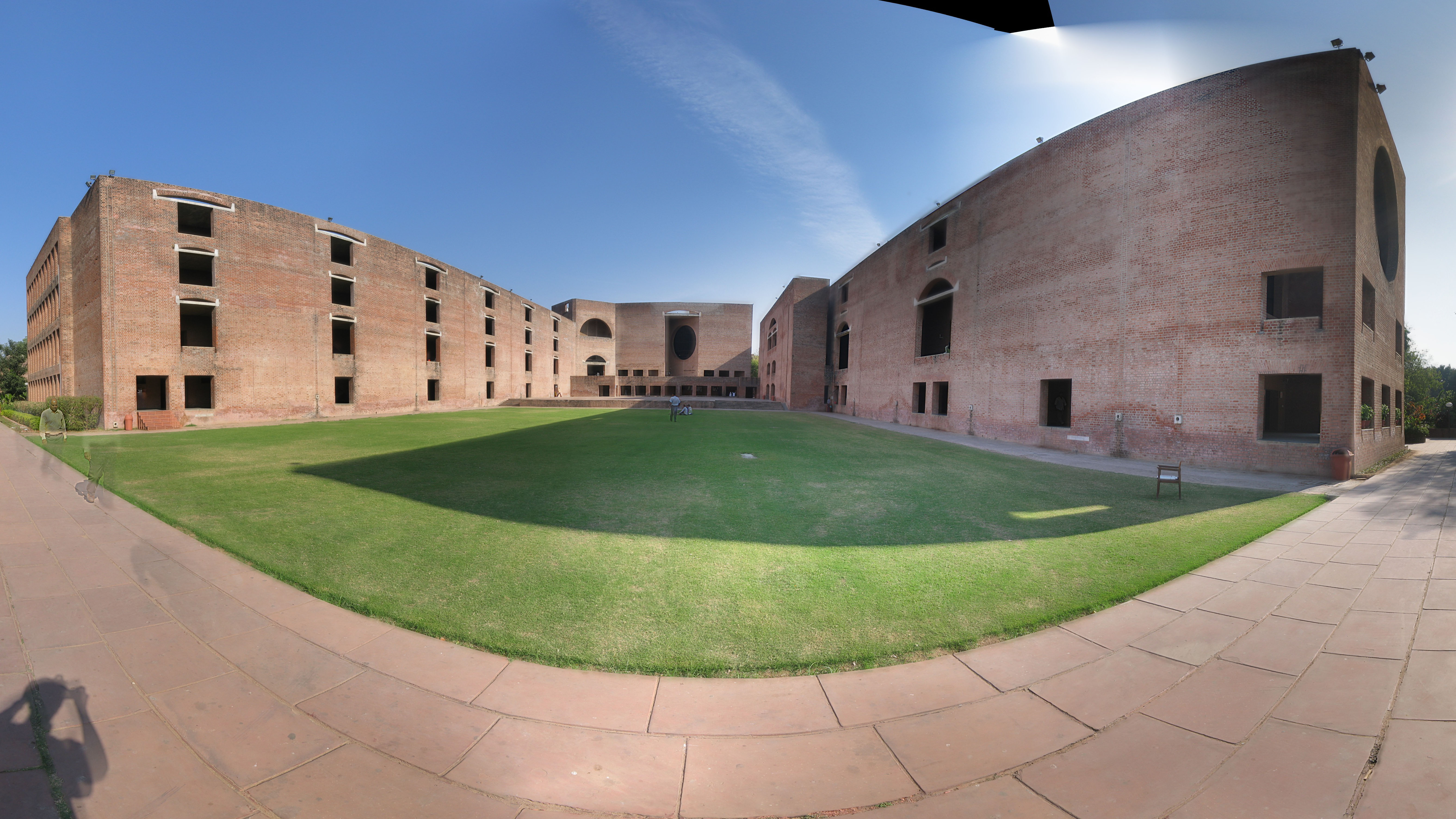
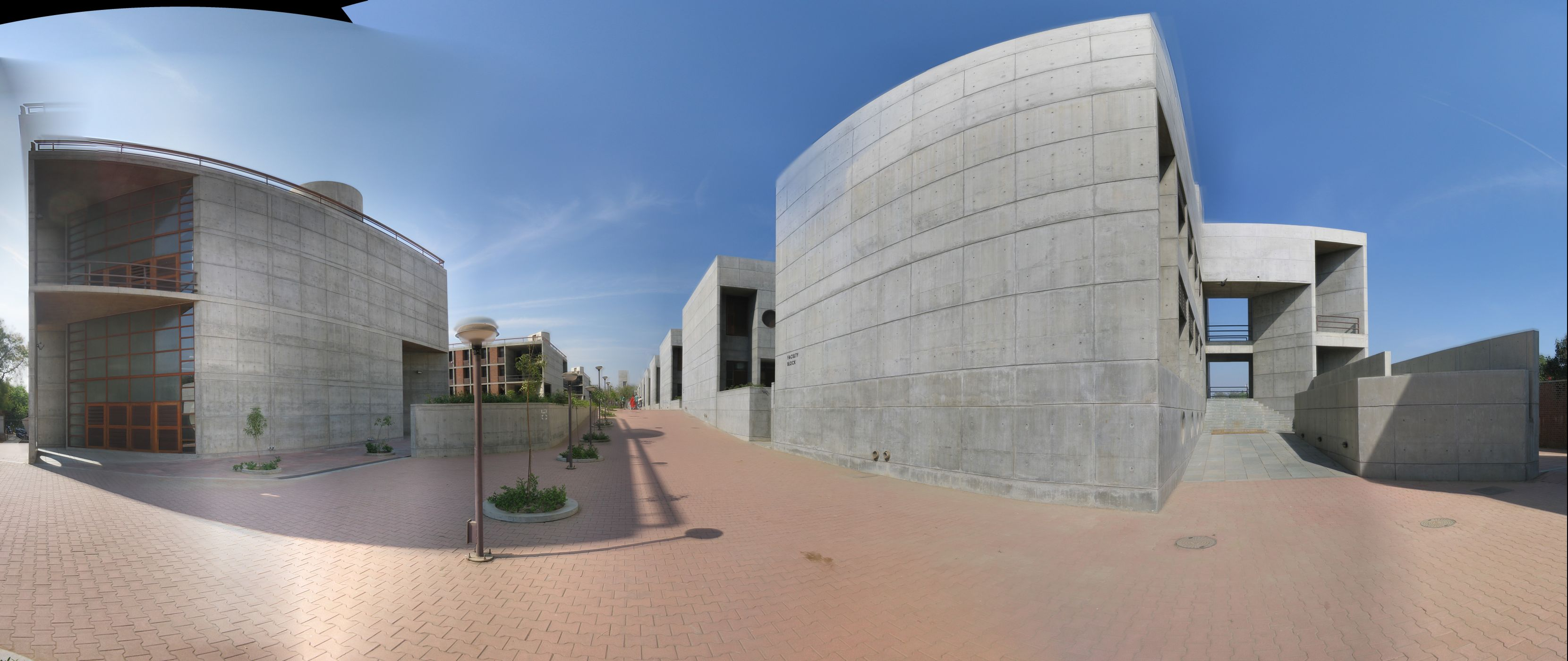
IIM Ahmedabad Old and New Campus.

Set up at IIM Ahmedabad as a Centre of Excellence with support from the Government of India’s Department of Science and Technology and Government of Gujarat, IIMA Ventures (formerly known as Centre for Innovation, Incubation & Entrepreneurship (CIIE)) is the epicentre of The Innovation Continuum.

IIMA Ventures studies, educates, incubates, accelerates and invests in early stage startups, aspiring entrepreneurs, and investors.

== Rankings ==
University rankings

Business – international
- QS (MBA) (2023): 44
- QS (MBA) (2024): 53
- QS (MBA-Asia) (2023): 8
- QS (MBA-Asia) (2024): 9
- Financial Times (MBA) (2022): 62
- Financial Times (MBA) (2024): 41

Business/Management – India
- NIRF (2023): 1
- NIRF (2024): 1
- Business Today (2022): 2
- Business Today (2023): 2
- Government colleges
- Outlook India (2022): 1
- Outlook India (2024): 1

Over the years, IIMA’s academically superior, market-driven, and socially impactful programmes have earned a high reputation and acclaim globally. It became the first Indian institution to receive international accreditation from EQUIS (European Quality Improvement System) by the European Foundation for Management Development (EFMD) in June 2008 and has maintained EQUIS accreditation since then. IIMA has been re-accredited in 2025 for another five years, the maximum length of time for which EQUIS accredits an institution.

In India, IIM Ahmedabad has consistently been ranked first among management schools in India by the National Institutional Ranking Framework since 2020. In the year 2025, the Institute had a score of 83.29, securing the top position in the country.

IIMA has been ranked 23rd globally in the Financial Times (FT) Executive Education Rankings (Open) 2026. The flagship two-year Post Graduate Programme in Management (PGP) is ranked 27th in the FT Masters in Management Ranking 2026, and the Full-Time One-Year Post Graduate Programme in Management (MBA-PGPX) has been ranked 27th in the FT Global MBA rankings 2026.

QS ranked its One Year MBA programme (PGPX) at rank 70 in the world and rank 9 in Asia in its Global MBA Rankings 2027. QS also ranked its Two Year MBA programme (PGP) at rank 46 in its Masters In Management 2026 category.

IIMA has consistently been rated as the number 1 B-School in India in 2025 by reputed national agencies, including Businessworld, The Week, Fortune India, and Business Today.

== People ==
=== Notable alumni ===
One of the most known alumni fora from IIMA is the famous Live Poet's Society. Among BSE 500 CEOs with MBA, the highest proportion come from IIM Ahmedabad. IIM-A alumni have garnered 9 Padma Awards – 4 Padma Bhushan awards (K. V. Kamath, CK Prahalad, Mallika Sarabhai and M. S. Banga) and 5 Padma Shri awards (Kiran Karnik, Kailasam Raghavendra Rao, S. P. Kothari, Sanjeev Bikhchandani, and Srikant Datar). Other notable alumni are Acharya Prashant, Raghuram Rajan, Arvind Subramanian, Harsha Bhogle, Ajay Banga, Rashmi Bansal, Chetan Bhagat, Ivan Menezes, Deep Kalra, Shikha Sharma, Falguni Nayar and Madhabi Puri Buch.

=== Notable faculty ===
Past and present faculty at IIM Ahmedabad include three former Governors of the Reserve Bank of India – C. Rangarajan (1968–1982), former Director I. G. Patel (1996–2001), and Y. Venugopal Reddy (current Professor of Practice). Other notable faculty over the years have been:

- C. K. Prahalad, famous management thinker, exponent of Core competency and Fortune at the Bottom of the Pyramid
- Ravi J. Matthai, first full-time Director, management educationist noted for establishing Institute of Rural Management Anand
- Bakul Harshadrai Dholakia, Padma Shri awardee, Director (2002–2007)
- Samuel Paul, Padma Shri awardee, IIMA's second director (1972–78)
- Ravindra Dholakia, member, Monetary Policy Committee (India), 2016-20
- Jayanth R Varma, member, Monetary Policy Committee (India), 2020-2024
- Vijay Govindarajan, a New York Times & Wall Street Journal best-selling author, Thinkers50 Hall of Fame 2019 & Coxe Distinguished Professor, Tuck School of Business
- Anil Kumar Gupta was a professor who was awarded Padma Shri for his contributions to management education
- Pankaj Chandra, former director, Indian Institute of Management Bangalore and current Vice Chancellor, Ahmedabad University
- G. Raghuram, director, Indian Institute of Management Bangalore
- Dheeraj Sharma, director, Indian Institute of Management Rohtak
- Shekhar Chaudhuri, former director, Indian Institute of Management Calcutta
- Abhiman Das, recipient of Prof P.C. Mahalanobis Medal in 2008 for contribution in Quantitative Economics, and Prof C.R. Rao National Award in Statistics for 2012-2013
- Abhishek Mishra was a faculty member for six years, before leaving to become a member of Samajwadi Party and an elected MLA of Uttar Pradesh
- Jahar Saha, Institute Director 1998–2002
- Rajnish Rai
- Tarun Jain, Mahalanobis Memorial Medalist, 2020

Other notable faculty include prominent scholars such as Marti G. Subrahmanyam, Ashish Nanda, and T. V. Rao, among others.

=== Others ===
N. R. Narayana Murthy, an Indian tech industrialist and the co-founder of Infosys, got his first job as chief systems programmer at IIM Ahmedabad.

== Endowment ==
The IIM Ahmedabad Endowment Fund is India's first endowment fund set up at a management school. The fund was established at IIM Ahmedabad in June 2020 from an initial corpus of ₹100 Crore provided by 10 founding alumni. The endowment aims to grow the fund to ₹1,000 Crore over the next five years. The fund was launched by the Chairperson of IIM Ahmedabad Board of Governors, Kumar Mangalam Birla.

== In popular culture ==
2 States, a Hindi film based on the eponymous novel by alumnus Chetan Bhagat, starring Alia Bhatt and Arjun Kapoor, was shot on the campus. Prior to this, the 1974 film Parinay, starring Shabana Azmi and Romesh Sharma in lead roles, also had some scenes shot at the Heritage campus.
