= Payal Shah Karwa =

Indian Author

- Born: Mumbai, Maharashtra, India
- Education: Bachelor of Commerce, Masters in Advertising & Communication
- Alma mater: Narsee Monjee College of Commerce and Economics; Narsee Monjee Institute of Management Studies
- Occupation: Author
- Notable work: The Bad Touch

Payal Shah Karwa is an Indian author popular for her book The Bad Touch.

== Early life ==
Payal Shah Karwa was born in Mumbai, Maharashtra. Payal attended the St Teresa's Convent High School in Santacruz, Mumbai and completed her B.Com. from Narsee Monjee College of Commerce and Economics. After that, she completed her Post Graduation Diploma in Advertising and Communications from Narsee Monjee Institute of Management Studies (NMIMS) in Juhu Vile Parle Mumbai.

== Personal life ==
She met her life partner, Rahul Karwa, at NMIMS and after their marriage in 2005, they continue living in Mumbai with their twin girls Adweta and Aarna. Rahul is the CEO of an event and content company.

== Career ==
=== Early career ===
After completing her Post Graduation, Payal worked in the field of brand communication in Midas Events, Ogilvy & Mather, Hanmer MS&L and Out of Home Media India Pvt Ltd. In 2009 she started her content agency The Word Jockey since December 2015.

In 2009, she also started working on her first book – The Bad Touch, which was based on the subject of child sex abuse. The book had stories about activist Harish Iyer, Director Anurag Kashyap and others.

The book was published by Hay House Marketing and launched in April 2013 by celebrity actress Tara Sharma Saluja, and artist Brinda Miller.

=== Later career ===
Currently she is Content Director at The Word Jockey Creative Content Studio. She has also founded the website on women's intimate health to break taboos surrounding sexual health issues, and co-founded a channel on kids’ content Yabadabadoo Kids.

She is a speaker and trainer, and has addressed audiences at various forums like Science of Storytelling at Nehru Science Centre, Times of India Literacy Carnival, TMFA, Merck, Kala Ghoda Arts Festival, Global Content Summit etc.
