= Nitin Rakesh =

Indian businessman

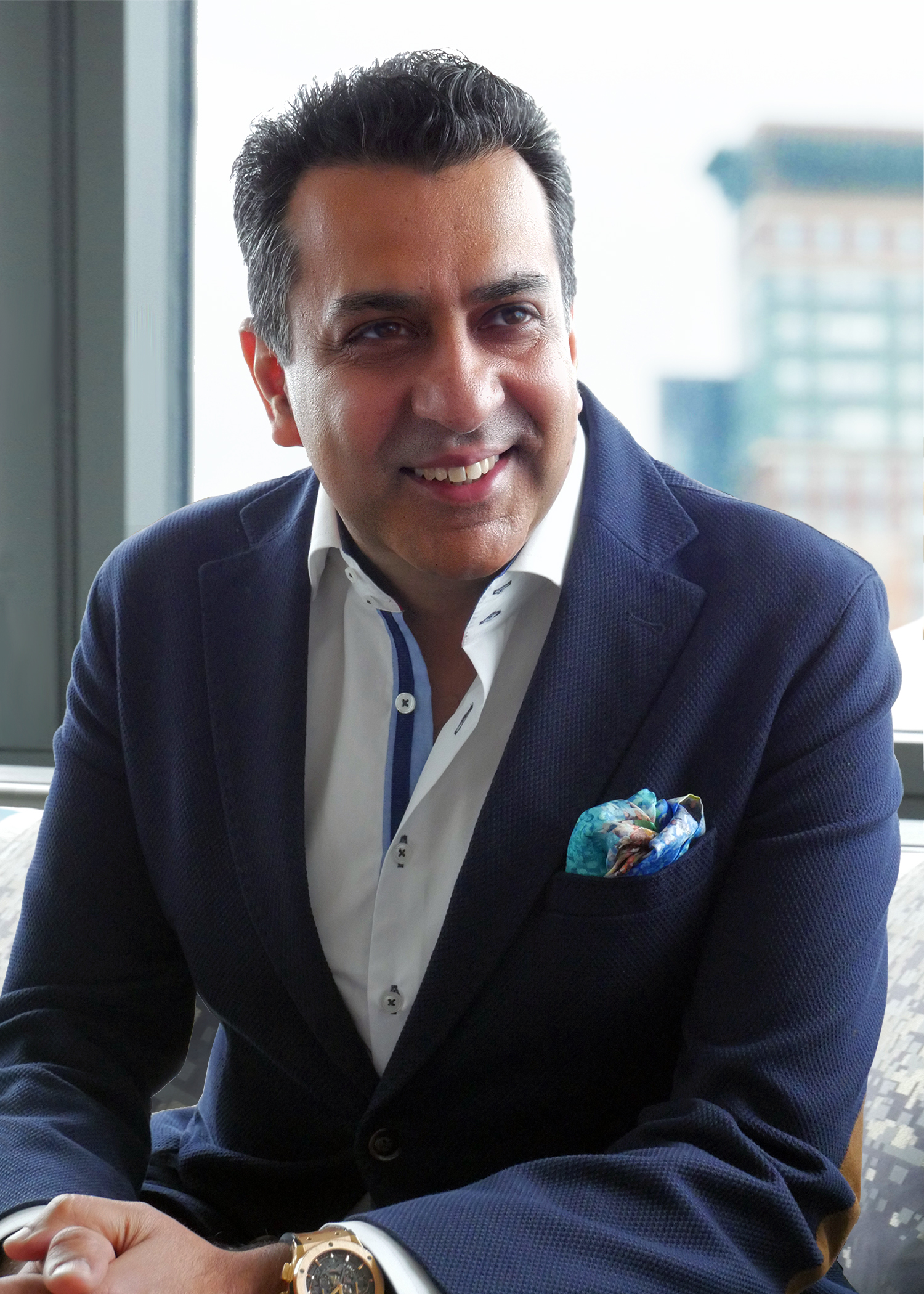
- Born: New Delhi
- Education: Netaji Subhas Institute of Technology; SVKM's NMIMS
- Occupation: CEO of Mphasis
- Organization: Mphasis

Nitin Rakesh is an Indian businessman, the chief executive officer and Director of Mphasis. Prior to that, Rakesh was Syntel's CEO and president, as well as CEO and Managing Director of Motilal Oswal Asset Management Company Ltd., and as Chief Executive of State Street Syntel Services, a joint venture between Syntel and State Street Bank.

== Early life and education ==
He moved to Delhi to earn his Bachelor of Engineering degree in Computer Science from Delhi Institute of Technology DIT (now Netaji Subhas University of Technology NSUT). Rakesh completed his Master's in Management Studies from SVKM's NMIMS, Mumbai in 1995.

== Career ==
In his early career, Rakesh worked for Unit Trust of India, setting up offshore mutual funds and a secondary Market Research Cell, Product Development and Risk Management.

From 2002 to 2008, Rakesh was employed at Syntel in various capacities. During his tenure, he founded Syntel's Business Process Outsourcing practice, building it into a significant contributor to Syntel's overall revenue. He was promoted to chief executive officer of Syntel's joint venture, State Street Syntel Services, where he led its India operations until 2008.

In September 2008, he was named CEO and managing director of Motilal Oswal Asset Management Company Ltd., a financial services company that specializes in exchange-traded funds (ETF) and separate accounts.

In September 2012, he left Motilal Oswal to become president, Americas for Syntel, where he managed Business Development and Nearshoring Center for Syntel's North American operations.

He was named CEO and President of Syntel, in April 2014. He officially resigned Syntel on 4 November 2016.

=== Mphasis ===
Rakesh was named CEO and Executive Director Mphasis on 29 January 2017. He took over from Ganesh Ayyar.

== Works/Publications ==
In 2020 Rakesh published Transformation in Times of Crisis: Eight Principles for Creating Opportunities and Value in the Post-Pandemic World, written with Jerry Wind of the Wharton School.
