= Bishwadeep Chatterjee =

Indian sound designer

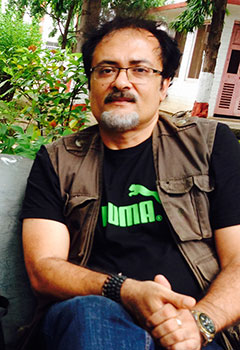
- Bishwadeep Chatterjee in 2020

Bishwadeep Chatterjee is an Indian film sound designer, sound editor and audio mixer. He won the National Film Award for Best Audiography thrice for the films Madras Cafe in 2013, Bajirao Mastani in 2015, Uri: The Surgical Strike in 2018. He is also the Member of The Oscar Academy's Class of 2018.

== Filmography ==
Sound Department
Year	Film	Director	Language	Notes
2003	Chokher Bali: A Passion Play	Rituparno Ghosh	Bengali	Debut film
2004	Raincoat	Rituparno Ghosh	Hindi	
2005	Parineeta	Pradeep Sarkar	Hindi	
2005	Antarmahal	Rituparno Ghosh	Bengali	
2006	Lage Raho Munna Bhai	Rajkumar Hirani	Hindi	
2007	Eklavya: The Royal Guard	Vidhu Vinod Chopra	Hindi	
2007	The Last Lear	Rituparno Ghosh	English	
2008	Via Darjeeling	Arindam Nandy	Hindi	
2009	3 Idiots	Rajkumar Hirani	Hindi	
2010	Lafangey Parindey	Pradeep Sarkar	Hindi	
2010	Do Dooni Chaar	Habib Faisal	Hindi	
2011	Ajeb Prem Abong	Arindam Dey	Bengali	
2012	Paanch Adhyay	Pratim D Gupta	Bengali	
2013	Meghe Dhaka Tara	Kamaleshwar Mukherjee	Bengali	
2013	Satyanweshi	Rituparno Ghosh	Bengali	
2013	Madras Cafe	Shoojit Sircar	Hindi	
2014	Buno Haansh	Aniruddha Roy Chowdhury	Bengali	
2014	Teenkahon	Bauddhayan Mukherji	Bengali	
2015	Open Tee Bioscope	Anindya Chatterjee	Bengali	
2015	Nachom-ia Kumpasar	Bardroy Barretto	Konkani	
2015	Teaspoon	Aban Bharucha Deohans	English	Short film
2015	Piku	Shoojit Sircar	Hindi	
2015	Bajirao Mastani	Sanjay Leela Bhansali	Hindi	
2016	Pink	Aniruddha Roy Chowdhury	Hindi	
2017	Sachin: A Billion Dreams	James Erskine	English Hindi Marathi	
2017	Dhh	Manish Saini	Gujarati	
2018	Padmaavat	Sanjay Leela Bhansali	Hindi	
2018	The Tribal Scoop	Beeswaranjan Pradhan	Odia	Documentary feature film
2018	The Tribal Scoop	Beeswaranjan Pradhan	Hindi	Documentary feature film
2018	Children of the Soil	Judhajit Bagchi Ranadeep Bhattacharyya	Hindi	
2018	October	Shoojit Sircar	Hindi	
2018	Rajma Chawal	Leena Yadav	Hindi	
2018	Uri: The Surgical Strike	Aditya Dhar	Hindi	
2018	Letters	Nitin Shingal	Hindi	Short film
2019	Roam Rome Mein	Tannishtha Chatterjee	English Hindi Italian	
2020	Chintu Ka Birthday	Devanshu Singh Satyanshu Singh	Hindi	
2020	V	Mohana Krishna Indraganti	Telugu	
TBA	Shaakuntalam	Gunasekhar	Telugu Tamil Hindi	
2026	Dhurandhar: The Revenge	Aditya Dhar	Hindi	
2026	Eetha	Laxman Utekar	Hindi	

== Awards ==
- National Film Award for Best Audiography - Madras Cafe
- National Film Award for Best Audiography - Bajirao Mastani
- National Film Award for Best Audiography - Uri: The Surgical Strike
- National Film Award for Best Non-Feature Film Audiography - Children of the Soil
