= Home First Finance =

Indian housing finance company

- Type: Public
- Traded as: NSE: HOMEFIRST; BSE: 543259
- ISIN: INE481N01025
- Industry: Financial services
- Founded: 2010
- Founders: Jerry Rao; PS Jayakumar; Manoj Viswanathan
- Headquarters: Mumbai, Maharashtra, India
- Number of locations: 171 branches and 373 touchpoints (2026)
- Area served: India
- Key people: Manoj Viswanathan (Managing Director & CEO); Ajay Khetan (Deputy CEO)
- Products: Home loan; Loan against property; Home construction loan; Home extension and renovation loan; Shop loan; Top-up loan
- Revenue: ▲₹1,923 crore (FY 2025–26)
- Net income: ▲₹540 crore (FY 2025–26)
- AUM: ▲₹15,878 crore (March 2026)
- Number of employees: 1,855 (March 2026)
- Rating: ICRA AA (Stable) A1+
- Website: homefirstindia.com

Home First Finance Company India Limited is an Indian housing finance company in the affordable housing segment based in Mumbai and founded in 2010. It provides home loans, mortgage loans and home construction loans. Its equity shares are listed on Bombay Stock Exchange and National Stock Exchange.

== History ==
Home First Finance was founded in 2010 by former chairman and co-founder of Mphasis, Jerry Rao; former CEO and MD of Bank of Baroda, PS Jayakumar; and Manoj Viswanathan, who previously worked with Citigroup India. It commenced operations in August 2010 after registering with the National Housing Bank, the regulatory and licensing body for housing finance companies in India. In 2011, Bessemer Venture Partners bought a minority stake in the company for an undisclosed sum.

In 2013, Tata Capital Growth Fund picked up a minority stake in the company. Home First Finance turned profitable in 2014.

In February 2017, private equity firm True North acquired a majority stake in Home First Finance for over ₹600 crore. A co-investor in this round, Aether (Mauritius) Limited, an affiliate of the Singaporean sovereign wealth fund GIC, also became part of the company's promoter group with True North.

In October 2020, Warburg Pincus acquired a 25% stake in Home First Finance for ₹700 crore. In January 2021, Warburg Pincus increased its stake to 30.62% ahead of Home First Finance's initial public offering.

In January 2021, Home First Finance launched its initial public offering (IPO) of ₹1,154 crore; the IPO was subscribed over 26 times. Equity shares of the company began trading on Bombay Stock Exchange and National Stock Exchange on 3 February 2021.

In December 2021, Union Bank of India (UBI) and Home First Finance entered into a strategic co-lending partnership. Home First Finance signed a similar partnership with Central Bank of India in September 2022 and Axis Bank in 2025.

In December 2022, Home First Finance raised ₹280 crore from International Finance Corporation to provide financing for green affordable housing customers.

In May 2024, the company's assets under management crossed ₹10,000 crore.

In April 2025, Home First Finance raised ₹1,250 crore through a qualified institutional placement (QIP), which saw participation from investors including International Finance Corporation, Capital World, Fidelity Funds and HDFC Mutual Fund.

== Finances ==
Year	Revenue (in ₹ crore)	Net profit (in ₹ crore)	AUM (in ₹ crore)
FY 2017–18	146	25	1,356
FY 2018–19	271	46	2,444
FY 2019–20	419	80	3,618
FY 2020–21	489	100	4,141
FY 2021–22	586	186	5,380
FY 2022–23	796	228	7,198
FY 2023–24	1,157	306	9,698
FY 2024–25	1,539	382	12,713
FY 2025–26	1,923	540	15,878

== ESG ==
Home First Finance has been rated in the category of "low risk" by Morningstar's Sustainalytics with a score of 17.4. It has an S&P Global ESG score of 46. The company had 450 green home certifications, as of March 2026.

The company's corporate social responsibility project, titled Project Sashakt, is focused on the upliftment of migrant worker communities in Ahmedabad.
