= Carlton Braganza =

Indian musician

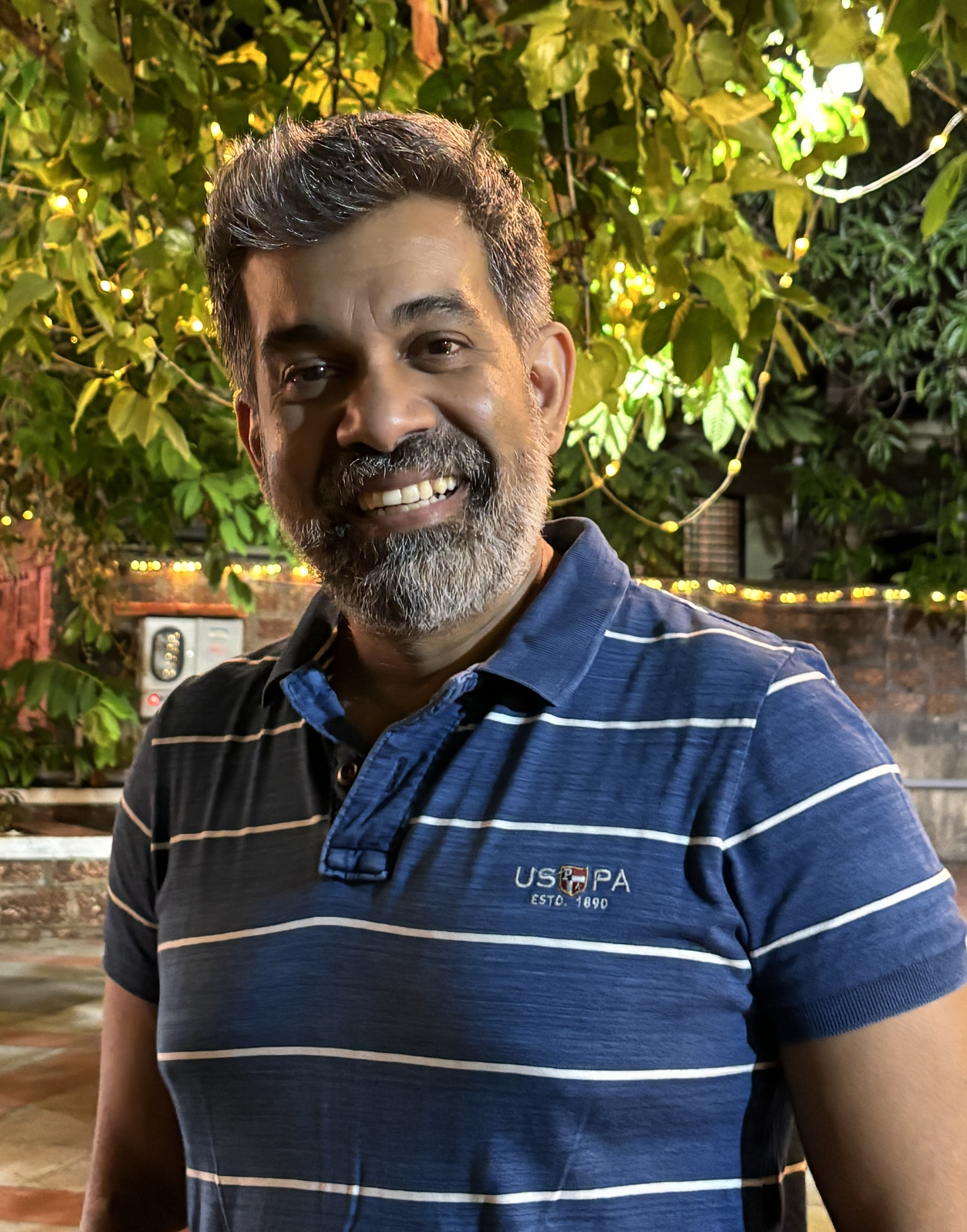
- Braganza in 2024
- Education: St. Xavier's College, Mumbai
- Notable work: OPUS, Myopusradio and JUKEBOX JAMMIES
- Website: carltonbraganza.com

Carlton Braganza is an Indian singer and entrepreneur known for his hour-long "Jukebox Jammies" music sessions during the 2020 COVID-19 lockdowns. During the COVID pandemic lockdown in India, Braganza started "Jukebox Jammies" on 22 March 2020. The series ran for almost 250 episodes, receiving more than 10 million views across Facebook and YouTube by the end of 2021. Braganza launched a virtual talent competition called 'KroaKING'' in 2022. Carlton performed with Natalie Di Luccio at the Kala Ghoda Arts Festival in 2023.

== Awards ==
Braganza was recognized at the India Nightlife Convention & Awards 2021 in the "Lockdown's Leading Lights" category for his contributions during the pandemic.
