= Bharat Desai =

Businessman

- ભરત દેસાઈ
- Born: November 1952 (age 73); Kenya
- Education: University of Michigan; Indian Institute of Technology, Bombay
- Occupation: Chairman of Syntel
- Spouse: Neerja Sethi
- Children: 2

Bharat Desai (Gujarati: ભરત દેસાઈ; born November 1952) is an American billionaire businessman, and the co-founder and chairman of Syntel.

== Early life ==
Bharat Desai was born in November 1952, in Kenya. He is of Gujarati Indian origin. In his childhood, he lived in Mombasa and Ahmedabad. Desai received a bachelor's degree in electrical engineering from the Indian Institute of Technology Bombay and an MBA in finance from the Stephen M. Ross School of Business.

== Career ==
Desai co-founded Syntel, with his wife Neerja Sethi, of which he is the chairman.

Desai is a board member of several educational institutions, including the John F. Kennedy School of Government at Harvard University, Students in Free Enterprise (SIFE) and the Stephen M. Ross School of Business at the University of Michigan.

== Personal life ==
He is married to Neerja Sethi, and they have two children.
