= Atos =

French IT corporation

Atos SE

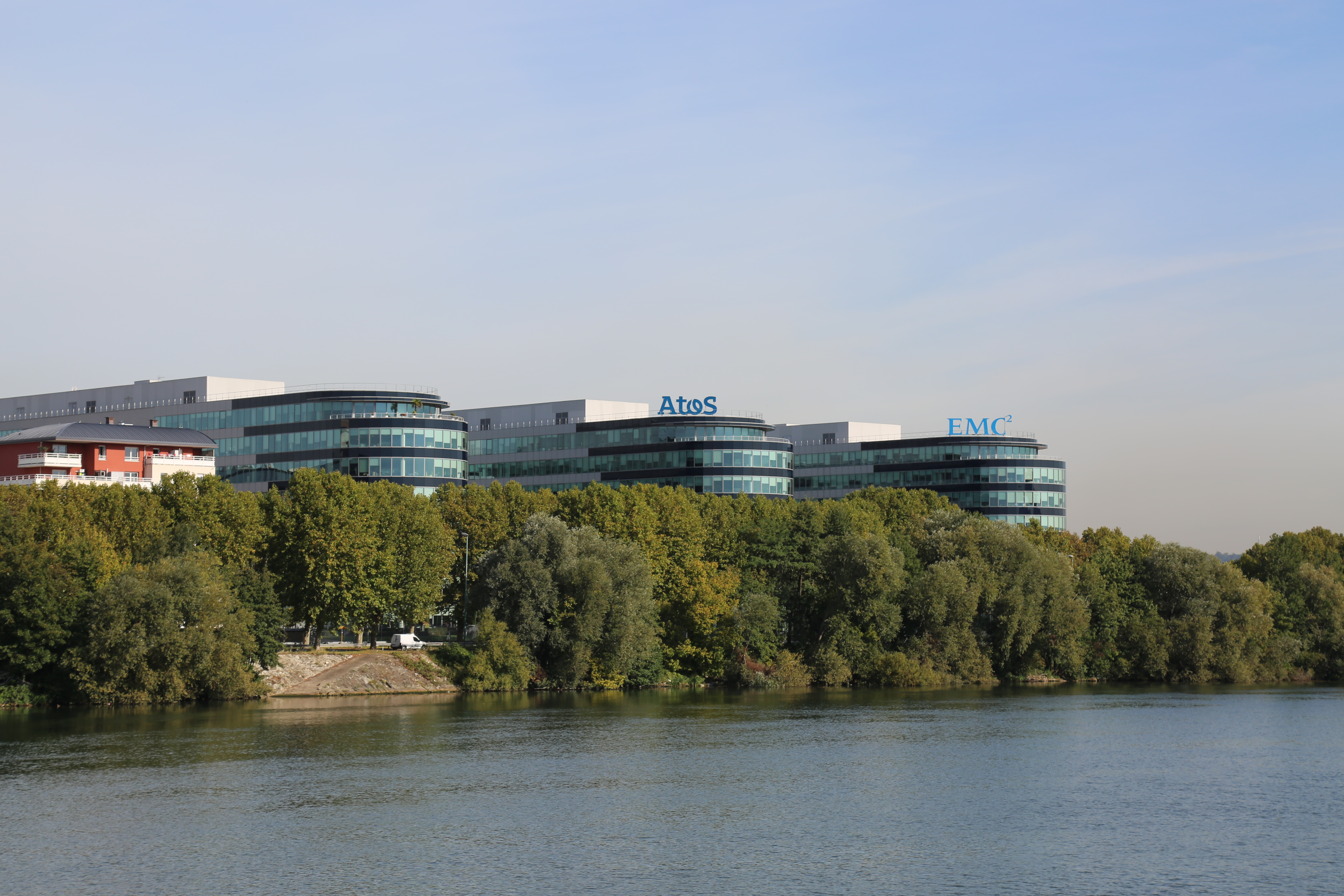
- Atos headquarters in Bezons (France)
- Type: Public
- Traded as: Euronext Paris: ATO; CAC Mid 60 Component
- ISIN: FR001400X2S4
- Industry: Information technology; Consulting; Outsourcing
- Founded: 2000; 26 years ago
- Headquarters: Bezons n. Paris, France
- Area served: Worldwide
- Key people: Philippe Salle (Group chairman & CEO)
- Revenue: ▼€10.69 billion (2023)
- Operating income: ▼€−3.3 billion (2023)
- Net income: ▼€−3.7 billion (2023)
- Total assets: ▼€11.29 billion (2023)
- Total equity: ▼€61 million (2023)
- Number of employees: ▼54,000 (2026)
- Subsidiaries: Syntel, Eviden
- Website: atos.net

Atos SE is a European multinational information technology (IT) service and consulting company with headquarters in Bezons suburb of Paris, France, and offices worldwide. It specialises in hi-tech transactional services, unified communications, cloud, big data and cybersecurity services. Atos operates worldwide under the brands Atos, Syntel, and Eviden.

== History ==
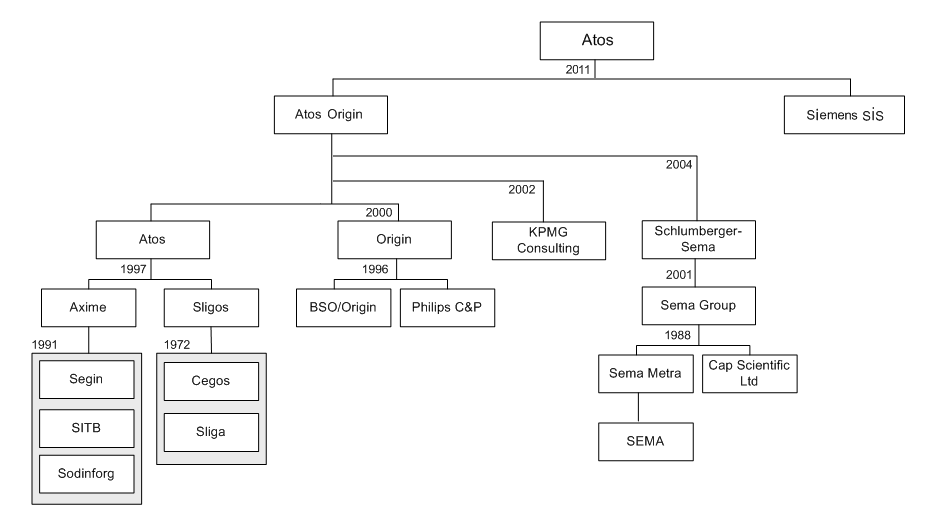
History of Atos acquisitions as of 2011

The company was formed in 1997 through a merger of two French IT companies; and combined with the Dutch-based company Origin B.V. in 2000 to become Atos Origin. It subsequently acquired KPMG Consulting's UK and Netherlands business in 2002 and SchlumbergerSema in 2004.

In 2010 Atos Origin announced the buyout of Siemens IT Solutions and Services and finalized the acquisition in July 2011. Afterwards, the company name reverted to Atos.

From 2022 to 2024 there were negotiations with Czech billionaire Daniel Křetínský to sell Atos for about $2 billion, which ended in failure in February 2024.

Logo of Atos Origin used prior to July 2011

=== Background: a series of mergers ===
In 1996, Origin B.V. was created after a merger of the Dutch company BSO and the Philips C&P (Communications & Processing) division, while a year later in 1997, Atos was created following a merger of the French companies Axime and Sligos. In 2001, Atos Origin sold its Nordic operations to WM-data. In 2002, it made a major acquisition by buying KPMG Consulting in the United Kingdom and in the Netherlands. Then in 2004, it acquired SchlumbergerSema, the IT service division of Schlumberger and took over the infrastructure division of ITELLIUM, a subsidiary of KarstadtQuelle.

At the same time (2004), the company created a new subsidiary, Atos Worldline, and the renaming of its consulting activities as Atos Consulting. Also in 2004, Atos Origin Australia, originating from Philips, was sold to Fujitsu. In 2005, Atos Origin sold its activities in the Nordic region, which had become part of the company with the acquisition of Sema Group, to WM-data while in 2006, Atos Origin sold its operations in the Middle East to local management.

In October 2007, Philippe Germond replaced longtime CEO Bernard Bourigeaud. Two shareholders, the hedge funds Centaurus Capital and Pardus Capital, tried to gain control over the company via the supervisory board. In November 2008, the boardroom battle came to an end when Thierry Breton replaced Philippe Germond as chairman and CEO.

=== Siemens IT ===
In December 2010 Atos Origin agreed to acquire the IT subsidiary of Siemens for €850 million. As part of the transaction, Siemens agreed to take a 15% stake in the enlarged Atos, to be held for a minimum of five years.

The company dropped the "Origin" suffix of its name in July 2011 after completing its acquisition of the Siemens unit. This was said to stand for "Atos to Siemens" hence the logo contains a capitalised S (AtoS).

In November 2011 Atos and software services provider Ufida International Holdings formed the joint venture Yunano. The two companies invested €5.7 million. Atos has 70 percent and UFIDA has 30 percent. The joint venture has its HQ in Bezons, France, a suburb of Paris. In 2012 Atos announced the creation of a new company called Canopy. The CEO is Philippe Llorens. In 2011 Atos introduced a Zero Email initiative, banning email as a form of internal communications, except for use with customers and prospects. As part of the initiative, Atos acquired the French software company blueKiwi in early 2012, rolling out its ZEN social networking software across its organisation.

=== Bull ===
In August 2014, Atos announced that it had acquired a controlling stake in Bull SA through a tender offer launched in May. Atos announced plans in October 2014 to buy out or squeeze out the remaining share and bondholders of Bull. In March 2026, Atos Group sold Bull SA to the French government.

=== Xerox ITO ===
On 19 December 2014 Atos announces the acquisition of Xerox's IT Outsourcing business for US$1,050,000,000, tripling the size of the North American business. At the time of the acquisition, the unit generated US$376,000,000 (Q3 2014) and had 9,800 employees operating in 45 countries.

=== Syntel ===
In October 2018, the company accelerated its expansion in North America with the US$3,570,000,000 (including debt) acquisition of Syntel, a company with activities in banking, financial services, healthcare, retail and insurance.

=== Google Cloud ===
In April 2018, Atos announced a global partnership with Google Cloud to help offer secure artificial intelligence systems. As part of this partnership, the two companies would create common offerings and open "labs" dedicated to artificial intelligence in London, Dallas, Munich and Paris.

=== Worldline ===
In 2019, the company divested from Worldline, its payment subsidiary, as part of its strategy to become a "digital pure player". The company gradually sold its shares, retaining only a 3.82% stake in Worldline as at April 2020.

On 1 November 2019, Elie Girard replaced Thierry Breton as chief executive officer, following Breton's appointment as European Commissioner for Prosperity and Industrial Strategy.

=== Maven Wave ===
In December 2019, Atos acquired Maven Wave, a US-based Google Cloud Premier Partner specialising in cloud and mobile applications, data analytics, experience design and cloud infrastructure.

=== Joliot-Curie ===
In June 2020, Atos, GENCI and CEA revealed the "Joliot-Curie" supercomputer which would help in academic and industrial open research.

=== Failed acquisition bid for DXC ===
In February 2021, Atos ended talks for a potential acquisition of DXC Technology. Atos has proposed for US$10 billion including debt for acquisition.

=== Eviden ===
In April 2023, Atos launched the Eviden brand ahead of a €5 billion carve-out. Following the launch of the brand, the main areas of focus for Atos were data centers and hosting, digital workplaces, unified communications and business process outsourcing. Eviden will focus on professional services and consulting, bringing together Atos' digital, big data and security divisions. However, this division had still not been approved by the board of directors in November 2023. As of August 2023, the Eviden brand remains a wholly owned subsidiary.

=== Financial difficulties ===
By early 2024, Atos was in financial difficulties. According to Le Monde, it had missed several sectoral shifts and "made a series of poor strategic decisions until it imploded", prompting the biggest French collapse of the last five years. Atos faced being "dismantled and wiped off the map", with its managed IT services division set to be acquired by Czech billionaire Daniel Kretinsky, and its cybersecurity and supercomputer expertise going to Airbus, leaving its digital consulting business to go to Onepoint. In April 2024, it reported total debts of almost €5 billion, and was exploring financial restructuring options to stabilise its finances; in May 2024, Atos was considering four competing bids to inject new money into the firm. The value of the company's shares had dropped 97%, and it had had four chief executives in two years. In June, discussions about a rescue deal with a consortium led by its biggest shareholder, Onepoint, broke down and Atos began negotiations with bondholders about a new restructuring deal. On 4 July 2024, Atos announced a restructuring plan which involved conversion of about €2.8 billion of debt into equity, with creditors also contributing €233 million of new equity. It aimed to complete all restructuring operations by the end of 2024.

In October 2024, the French government planned to acquire Atos' advanced computing division for €500 million, potentially reaching €625 million with earn-outs. This deal aimed to protect strategic technologies and stabilize Atos amid financial challenges.

== Services and activities ==
=== Services ===
Atos activities are organized in four divisions:

- Infrastructure & Data Management: Datacenter management, service desk and unified communications;
- Business Applications & Platform Solutions: consulting and systems integration;
- Big Data & Cybersecurity: production of high-performance computers & servers and cybersecurity;
- Previously: Worldline: e-commerce payment services and point of sale terminal applications

=== Geographies ===
==== United Kingdom ====
According to a National Audit Office report on the government's four biggest suppliers, Atos earned £700 million in revenue from the public sector in the UK in 2012; of £7.2 billion sales worldwide. At that time, Atos held £3 billion worth of UK government contracts providing services to a wide range of organizations including NHS Scotland, Home Office, Welsh Government, the Ministry of Defence, Transport for Greater Manchester, the BBC, SLC and a multimillion outsourcing contract to NS&I. In the United Kingdom, from 1998 to 2015, Atos' healthcare division operated the Department for Work and Pensions (DWP)'s Work Capability Assessment.

== Controversy ==
=== Atos Healthcare ===
During its time operating the Work Capability Assessment (WCA) the company's healthcare division, Atos Healthcare, faced extensive criticism over its practices. In August 2015, statistics from the DWP showed that 2,380 people had died between 2011 and 2014 soon after being found fit for work through disability benefit assessments. In 2014, "the DWP negotiated an early exit from the existing WCA contract with the private firm, Atos, after raising concerns about the quality of its work". Nevertheless, in 2016 Atos was still undertaking work for the DWP in assessing Personal Independence Payment (PIP) applications. The Press Association said in 2017 that Atos, used by the DWP to make its decisions, were due to be paid more than £700m for their five-year contracts against an original estimate of £512m.

When Atos took over administering PIP, estimates of how fast claims could be processed were over-optimistic as were estimates of how easily claimants could get to assessment centres. This led to delays in assessments, distress to claimants and unexpectedly high costs. Atos was accused of misleading the government.

Atos developed a computer system that would extract data from GP's computers nationwide. Costs rose from £14 million to £40 million and it was felt Atos had taken insufficient care how it spent taxpayers' money.

When Atos lost the contract for fitness to work tests, Richard Hawkes of Scope said, "I doubt there's a single disabled person who'll be sorry to hear that Atos will no longer be running the fit-for-work tests."

Mark Serwotka of Public and Commercial Services Union described the assessments as "designed to harass vulnerable people and take their benefits away rather than provide support and guidance. Doctors, MPs and disabled people all believe the tests should be scrapped so, instead of replacing the failed Atos with another profit-hungry provider, the government should bring the work in-house and invest in it properly."

Liberal Democrat leader, Tim Farron questioned how Atos and Capita could have been paid over £500m from tax payers money for assessing fitness to work as 61% who appealed won their appeals. Farron stated, "This adds to the suspicion that these companies are just driven by a profit motive, and the incentive is to get the assessments done, but not necessarily to get the assessments right. They are the ugly face of business."

In 2014, Atos Healthcare rebranded its occupational health business to become OH Assist. The Atos Healthcare brand was reserved for use for the PIP contract. Atos sold its OH Assist business to CBPE Capital in 2015.

For a number of years Atos denied claimants benefits or reduced their benefits if they did not take addictive opiate based pain killers. The Department for Work and Pensions subsequently revised its guidance stating, "healthcare practitioners [disability benefits assessors] should be mindful that the level of analgesia used does not necessarily correlate with the level of pain".

=== Corporation tax ===
It was disclosed in November 2013 through the National Audit Office that Atos had paid no corporation tax at all in the UK in 2012. The total value of contracts that had been awarded to Atos by June 2013 was approximately £1.6 billion.

== Sponsorship ==
=== Olympic/Paralympic Games ===
Atos has been the official IT partner for the Olympic Games since 2001 and is expected to continue until at least 2024. Atos, through the SchlumbergerSema's acquisition, was involved in previous Games during the 1990s, starting with the Barcelona Olympic Games in 1992. Atos has been one of 11 major sponsors for the Olympic Games since 2001.

In 2011, some UK-based disability campaign groups called for a boycott of the 2012 Summer Paralympics due to Atos' sponsorship of the games and Atos Healthcare's UK contract to perform Work Capability Assessments on behalf of the Department for Work and Pensions (DWP). During the first week of the Paralympics in the summer of 2012, activists and disabled people targeted Atos in a series of nationwide protests. This culminated on Friday 31 August with a demonstration outside Atos headquarters in London, which ended in a confrontation with the police.

Through the International Olympic Committee's TOP (The Olympic Partner) programme, Atos has sponsored athletes from all over the globe in order to support their Olympic ambitions, including Danny Crates, the 2004 Paralympic Champion in the 800m.

=== 2014 Commonwealth Games ===
Atos was named as an official supporter of the 2014 Commonwealth Games in Glasgow. On 26 June 2013, "Glasgow Against Atos" occupied one of the Commonwealth Games venues in protest against Atos sponsorship.

=== 2015 Southeast Asian Games ===
Atos was the official sponsor of 2015 Southeast Asian Games in Singapore.

=== 2018 European Championships ===
In February 2017 Atos was appointed as the first official sponsor of the Glasgow 2018 European Championships. The company has been awarded a £2.5 million contract for timing, scoring and results.

== See also ==
- List of IT consulting firms
