= Jerry Rao =

Indian businessman

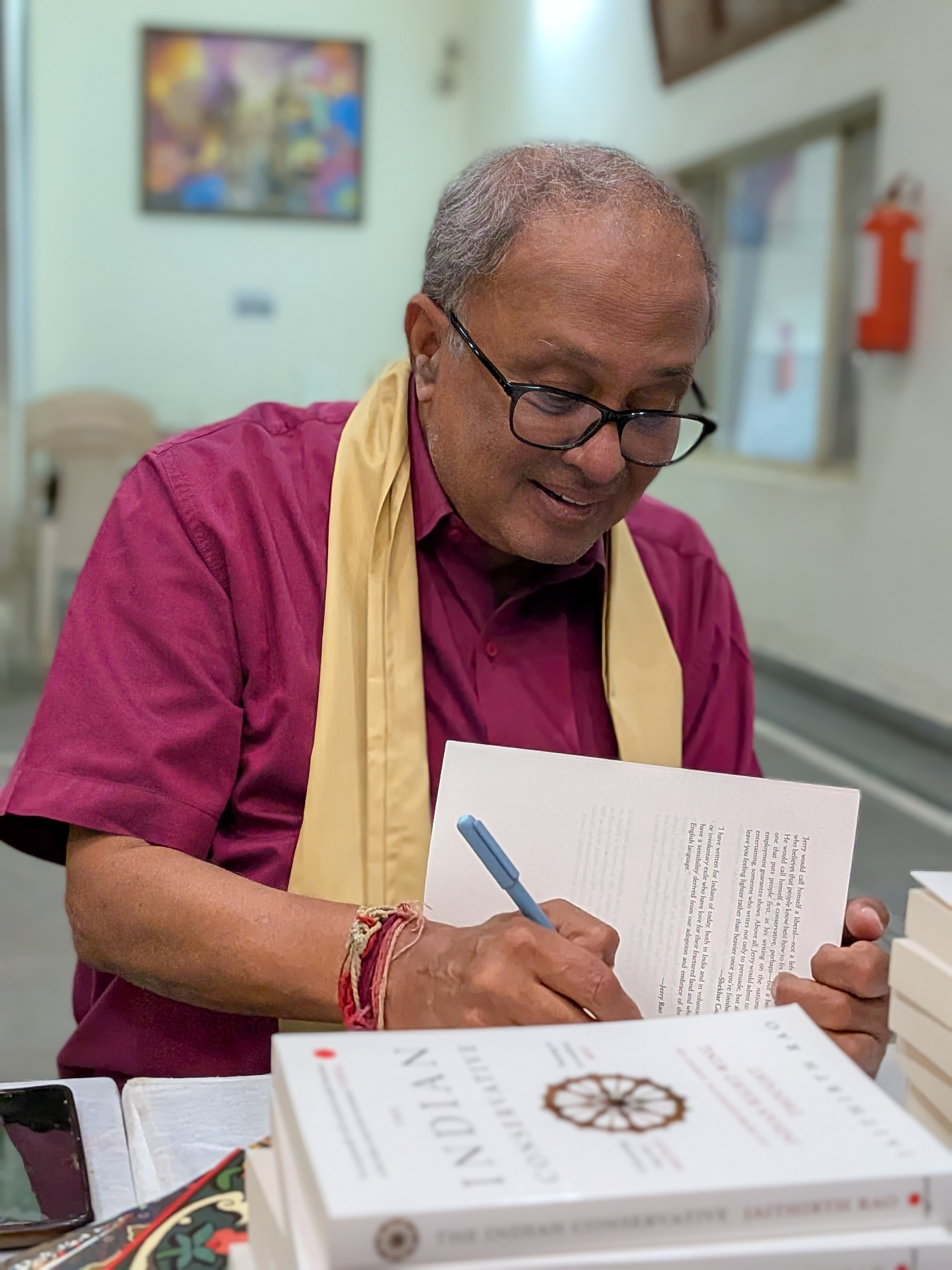
Jaithirth signing book copies at History Literature Festival 2026

Jaithirth "Jerry" Rao is an Indian businessman and entrepreneur. He is the founder and former CEO of the software company Mphasis. He is the founder of Value and Budget Housing Corporation (VBHC) (now known as VBHC Value Homes Pvt. Ltd.), an affordable housing venture which he founded in 2008. He was also a founder and director of Home First Finance Company, a housing finance company focused on first time home buyers. He was also a member of the editorial advisory board of the Swarajya magazine.

In 1998, Rao started Mphasis Corporation, a software company based in California, which subsequently merged with BFL Software in 2000. MphasiS rapidly rose to be one of the top 10 IT/BPO companies in India. In 2008, EDS acquired a majority stake in MphasiS. Mr. Rao stayed on as non-executive chairman of MphasiS and for some time as advisor to EDS.

Rao held several positions in Citibank prior to his founding MphasiS in 1998. In a banking career of over 20 years, he served with Citi and its parent Citicorp in various capacities in Asia, Europe, South America, and North America. He was Head of the Development Division of Citicorp and Chairman and CEO of Transaction Technologies Inc., based in California.

Rao is an alumnus of Loyola College, Chennai, Indian Institute of Management Ahmedabad and the University of Chicago. He has also been given a Distinguished Alumnus Award from Loyola College, IIM Ahmedabad and the University of Chicago. His many areas of interest include sustainable construction technology, I.T. strategy, customer relationship management (CRM) and e-commerce – a subject on which he has testified before the US Congress. He teaches at IIM Ahmedabad, IIT Bombay and at LIBA, Chennai. He has been Entrepreneur-in-Residence at Harvard Business School. Rao has been on the boards of various companies. He has been on the Board of Trustees of Nasscom Foundation, Sujaya Foundation and India Foundation for the Arts.

== Personal life ==
He takes interest in mentoring and advising technology and social enterprises. Rao is married and lives with his family in Mumbai, India. Rao belongs to the Madhwa Brahmin community in India.

== Selected writings ==
Rao is a regular writer and speaker. Rao has published a volume of poetry (Gemini II published by Penguin India) and a book of essays (Notes from an Indian Conservative published by Rupa). He used to write a regular opinion column for the Indian Express and occasional columns for Seminar, Economic Times, India International Centre Quarterly and Mint.

== Books ==
- GEMINI II (1995)
- Notes From An Indian Conservative (2012) ISBN 8129120003
- The Indian Conservative: A History of Indian Right-Wing Thought (2019) ISBN 9353450624
- Economist Gandhi: The Roots And The Relevance Of The Political Economy Of The Mahatma (2021)

== Honors ==
Rao is a recipient of several distinguished business and government recognitions. He has been the Chairman of India's National Association of Software and Service Companies – NASSCOM. He was named the Ernst & Young 'Entrepreneur of the Year 2004' for the New York region along with MphasiS Vice Chairman Jeroen Tas, which followed his being similarly awarded in India for the year 2001 previously. In 2005, the Government of the Indian state of Karnataka honored him with the Rajyotsava Award.
