= Rakesh Khanna =

Indian businessman

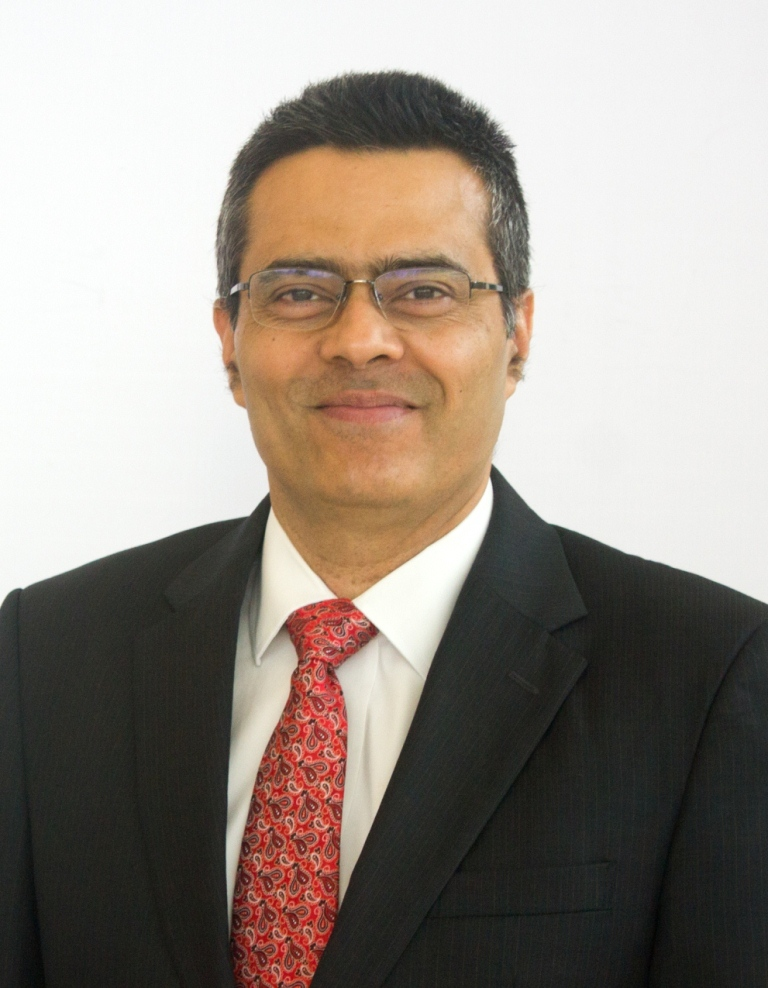
- Born: 1962 (age 63–64)
- Education: Veermata Jijabai Technological Institute; SVKM's NMIMS
- Occupation: Chief Executive Officer
- Spouse: Anuradha Khanna
- Children: 2
- Website: Rakesh Khanna

Rakesh Khanna (born 1962) was the chief executive officer of Atos Syntel.

He served as Syntel's chief executive officer and president until October 2018, after being appointed interim CEO in November 2016. Prior to that, he served as the company's chief operating officer from 2012 to 2016. He previously served as a president of Syntel's Banking and Financial Services business unit from 2005 until 2012. He was part of the Syntel executive advisory team that shaped Syntel's business process outsourcing (BPO) business.

Prior to Syntel, Khanna was part of the leadership team at I-flex Solutions. He has also worked with Tata Burroughs Limited where he managed projects in the US, UK, Belgium, Malaysia and India for several banks and financial groups.

== Early life and education ==
Khanna was born in Indore, Madhya Pradesh, a central state of India, and grew up in suburban Mumbai. He completed his B.E. (Electrical Engineering) degree from Veermata Jijabai Technological Institute, Mumbai, following which he did M.B.A (Marketing) from SVKM's NMIMS, Mumbai. He is a member of the Academic Council and Board of Studies for IT.

== Career ==
Khanna worked in the technology services industry in North America, Europe and Asia.

Before being appointed interim CEO in 2016, he was the COO of Syntel and has also was president of the company's Banking and Financial Services Business Unit from 2005 until 2012.

Prior to joining Syntel in 2005, he worked with Oracle Financial Services Software Limited (formerly I-flex Solutions Limited), where he was a member of the leadership team and spent 10 years in various roles. He was on the Supervisory Board of Login Systems SA, France, in which I-flex acquired a strategic stake in 2003. He also set up operations in Japan and Europe, leading and managing various elements of the operations in those countries. Other roles included leading sales in the Middle East and Europe, head of product marketing for its banking product, and Global Relationship Director for a roll out of their product at GE Consumer Finance in 43 countries.

Khanna worked with Citicorp CITIL managing sales and marketing of software products for 10 years. He has also worked with Tata Burroughs Limited for over a decade. He started as a mainframe programmer with the company and rose through the levels to become Group Manager. During his tenure, he managed projects for several banks and financial groups, including BACOB Savings Bank (Brussels), Nat West, Skipton, Yorkshire Building Societies (UK), GWB, and Tata Share Registry (TSRL).

== Awards ==
Khanna was rated as one of the top global COOs by AdvisoryCloud in 2014.
