= Harish Iyer =

Indian equal rights activist

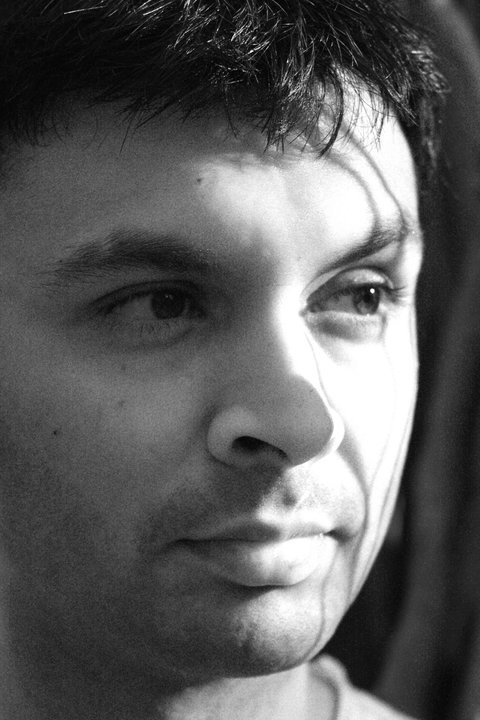
- Born: Harish Padma Vishwanath Iyer; 16 April 1979 (age 47); Barrackpore, West Bengal, India
- Education: SIES High School; Guru Nanak Khalsa College; St. Xavier's College, Mumbai; SVKM's NMIMS
- Occupations: Columnist; activist; blogger
- Website: hiyer.net

Harish Iyer, also known as "Aham", hiyer and "Harrish Iyer" (born 16 April 1979) is an Indian equal rights activist. Iyer engages in advocacy for a number of causes, including promoting the rights of the lesbian, gay, bisexual, and transgender (LGBT) community, children, women and survivors of child sexual abuse.

Harish Iyer was also one of the most vocal proponents of the decriminalization of homosexuality in India. He has engaged in several awareness campaigns about the impact of the decision and condemned the ruling via media advocacy. He has written articles and letters on the subject and appeared on top national television news shows to highlight the plight of the LGBT community in India in wake of the decision. He was one of the people to move the Indian Supreme Court to decriminalize homosexuality. In June 2018, he filed an Impleadement Application in the 377 case. In August 2018, the National Human Rights Commission (NHRC) appointed Iyer to the Core Group on LGBTI issues. This is the first group set up to look into concerns and challenges of the community, in a bid to harmonise existing laws with the needs of the community.

== Media advocacy ==
Iyer was featured on Indian movie star Aamir Khan's talk show Satyamev Jayate in an episode on the issue of child sexual abuse. In the show, he gave a frank and detailed account of his horrific experiences of childhood sexual abuse. Prior to Satyamev Jayate, he was seen in the panel of NDTV's popular talk show We the People, which is anchored by Barkha Dutt, and in Richa Anirudh's Hindi talk show Zindagi Live. British actor Stephen Fry elatedly tweeted "You're a hell of a guy!" after interviewing Harish for his BBC2 documentary "OUT THERE". In 2016, Iyer and his family starred with Elliot Page in his web series Gaycation.

In March 2015, Harish wrote a moving eulogy to his dear friend and Kolkata Park Street rape survivor Suzette Jordan after she succumbed to meningoencephalitis. Harish and Suzette had grown close after meeting at the Tehelka THiNK conference in Goa in 2014. Harish's letter raised several questions about the manner in which Suzette's trial was progressing and the indignities that she was subject to in court. He called for greater sensitivity in dealing with rape cases.

== Activism ==
Iyer routinely uses social media (blogs, Facebook and Twitter) to campaign for causes dear to him. He is best known for turning his personal blog as a helpline during the 26/11 Terror Attacks. Iyer later organised an animal aided therapy workshop along with Animal Angels in Mumbai to help citizens recuperate.

In 2009, Iyer and Shobhaa De initiated a campaign called S.I.T.A. (Sensitivity in True Action) Sena campaign to condemn the attack on women in a Bangalore pub by the right wing socio-political group Sri Ram Sene. Through the campaign they urged women to arm themselves with whistles and blow it on eve teasers. In August 2013, when the news of the gang-rape of a young photojournalist was published, in keeping with his quirky protests, Iyer marched on Mumbai's streets wearing bright red lipstick with a placard that read "Don't look at my lipstick. Listen to me".

In 2014, he appeared in a PETA ad campaign encouraging consumers to go vegetarian.

== In popular culture ==
His life inspired two films, director Onir's I Am and Judhajit Bagchi and Ranadeep Bhattacharyya directed Amen. In I Am, the actor Sanjay Suri plays Abhimanyu, a child sexual abuse survivor, a character inspired by Harish's life and that of Hyderabad-based fashion designer Ganesh Nallari. In Amen, actor Karan Mehra plays Harry (Harish Iyer), a young man who is confident about his sexuality but still has the ghosts of his childhood memories of sexual abuse haunting him.

A book by Payal Shah Karwa called The Bad Touch featuring the biographic account of Iyer has been published.

Amazon's Westland has signed up Harish Iyer for his autobiography titled "SON RISE".

== Awards and accolades ==
- Bharat Petroleum Corporation Limited, an Indian government owned firm, recognised Harish Iyer with the Energising Bharat award in the year 2016 for his work in the field of women's empowerment. The award was handed over by the petroleum minister of India Dharmendra Pradhan.
- The Guardian, the British national daily named Iyer in the list of the 100 most influential LGBT people in the world. He is listed at number 71, and was the only Indian national ever in this list.
- Pink Pages has named Iyer as one of India's seven most influential gay and lesbian people
- Iyer is one of the ten individuals to be awarded the Zindagi Live Awards for his work in creating awareness on child sexual abuse.

Harish Iyer has spoken many times at TEDx, an independently organised TED conference, including TEDxMasala on the topic "What if we had the culture of speaking about sex", then at TEDx Gitam University on the topic "Rising From The Ashes : From Abuse To Hope". and at TEDx XLRI, Jamshedpur.

Given his oratory skills and his ability to emote, Iyer finds a mention in the list of fiery motivational speakers in India.

Iyer spoke at Tehelka's THiNK conference for the year 2013. Other prominent speakers at the same event included Robert De Niro, Amitabh Bachchan, A R Rahman, Shekhar Kapur, Girish Karnad and Medha Patkar. He is also the recipient of the 2015 Karmaveer Puraskar.

== Controversies ==
Harish catapulted into the spotlight in May 2015 when his mother Padma Iyer placed what may be India's first gay matrimonial advertisement. While many top Indian newspapers refused to carry the advertisement, it was finally carried by Mid-Day. The ad attracted a lot of controversy for mentioning "Iyer preferred" (Iyer being a caste as well as the activist's last name). Both Harish and Padma received a lot of flak online and were accused of encouraging caste-based discrimination. However, they later clarified that the allegedly objectionable preference was mentioned "in jest" only to show how similar an LGBT matrimonial ad could be to an ad for a heterosexual alliance.
