= Amen (2010 film) =

- Film poster
- Directed by: Ranadeep Bhattacharyya; Judhajit Bagchi
- Written by: Ranadeep Bhattacharyya; Judhajit Bagchi
- Produced by: Yaanus Films; Valentina Erath; Harish Iyer
- Starring: Karan Veer Mehra; Jitin Gulati
- Cinematography: Varun Sud
- Edited by: Ranadeep Bhattacharyya; Judhajit Bagchi
- Music by: Jonathon Fessenden
- Release date: 2010
- Running time: 24 minutes
- Country: India
- Language: English

Amen is a 2010 short film directed, written and produced by Judhajit Bagchi and Ranadeep Bhattacharyya and was released in association with Passion Film.

== Synopsis ==
The World Wide Web brings the two protagonists, Andy and Harry, together on a nonchalant afternoon. But this planned sex date takes an unexpected twist and the interactions between Andy and Harry go beyond physical pleasure, bringing out questions that need to be answered, truths that need to be accepted and a life that stands to be reckoned.

"Amen" makes two characters meet, experience hope amidst confusion, explore truths about sexuality and the self and delves into the profound meaning of life in the continuum of its trifles. The film reflect the diversity of issues that the community continues to face — from social prejudices to the predicament of acknowledging their sexuality.

== Reception ==
The film is inspired from the life of the human right activist Harish Iyer. Amen explores gay relationship like no other movie has done before. It teaches the world that life does not allow one to choose his sexuality, one is born with it. Amen strives to be unapologetically accurate in its depiction of gay relationships, and the intricacies and challenges faced by gay individuals in India today. The dynamics of how we accept our sexual orientation and live with it in contemporary society are poignantly shown in the movie, which provokes thought about how we form our identity based on ourselves, our past experiences and our society. The short also stirs up questions in the viewer's mind – why are we still afraid to accept our own feelings, learn how to go beyond the traumas of our own pasts and learn to go with the flow. Amen is also part of the DVD archived at the Kinsey Institute, Indiana University

In 2011 Amen was selected as the only Indian film on the Iris Prize, also known as the 'gay Oscars', list of 30 top LGBT films from across the globe.

== Cast ==
- Karan Veer Mehra – Harry
- Jitin Gulati – Andy
- Madhusmita Sahoo - Tina (voice)

== Controversies ==
Amen fell into controversy with Central Board of Film Certification and the struggle went on for six months until the short was granted permission to be released with an adult certificate by the review committee.

== Film festivals ==
- 23rd New York Lesbian, Gay, Bisexual, & Transgender Film Festival, NewFest 2011
- 16th Chéries-Chéris, festival du film lesbien, gay, bi, trans, queer et ++++ de Paris, Paris 2010
- Mumbai Queer Film Festival, Mumbai, 2011
- Iris Prize Film Festival, Cardiff, UK, 2011
- Engendered I View Film Festival New York, 2010
- 4th Nigah Queer Fest, New Delhi, 2010
- Queer Caribbean Film Festival, New York, 2011
- 16th Seattle Lesbian & Gay Film Festival, 2011
- 7th Seattle South Asia Film Festival 2011, USA
- Rio Gay Film Festival, Rio de Janeiro – Brazil, 2012
