= Jeroen Tas =

Dutch entrepreneur

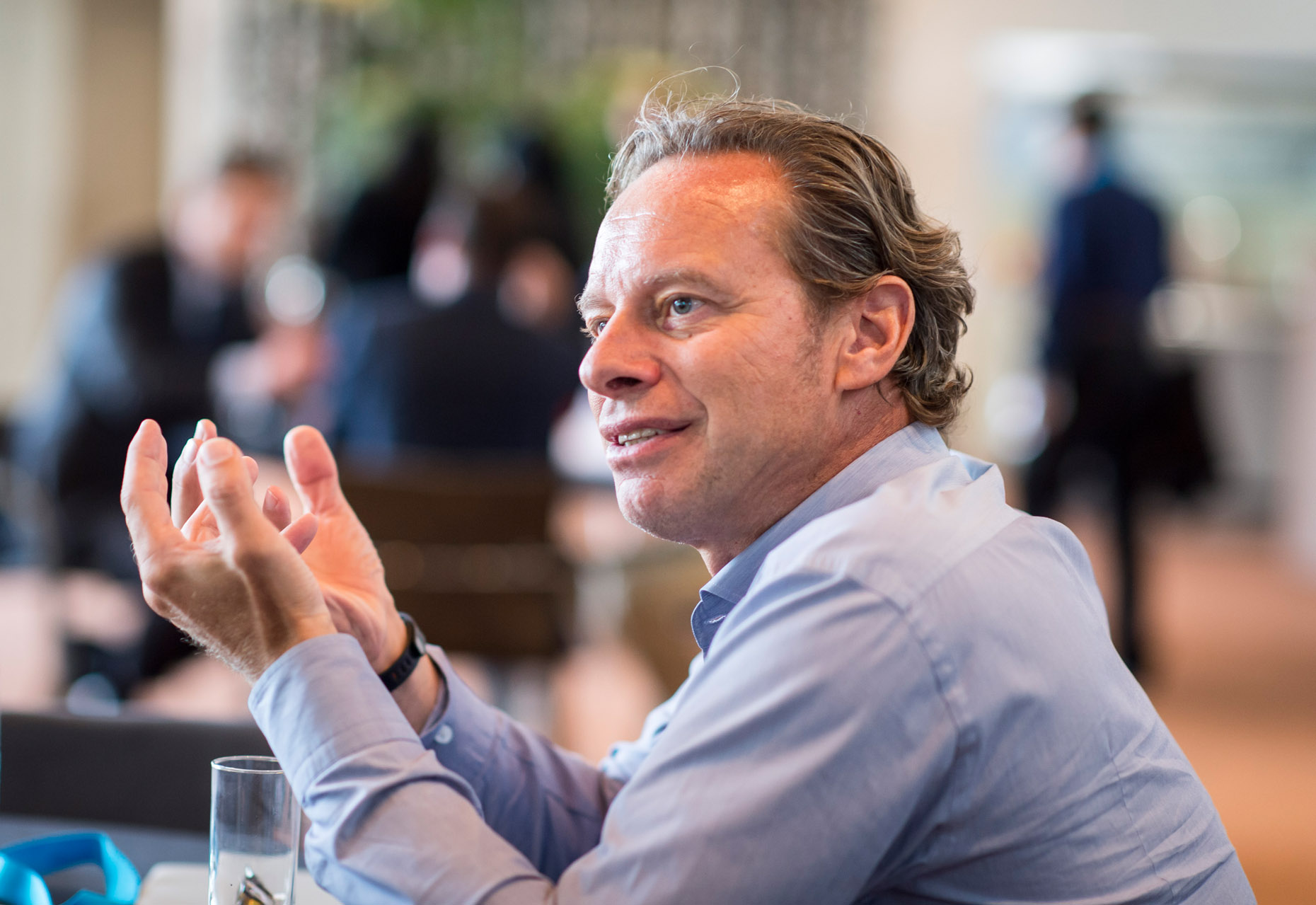
- Born: May 6, 1959 (age 66)
- Citizenship: The Netherlands
- Occupation: Strategic Business Development at Royal Philips
- Employer: Philips
- Website: https://www.philips.com/a-w/innovationmatters/blog.html

Jeroen Tas (born May 6, 1959) is a Dutch entrepreneur and senior executive in the healthcare, information technology and financial services industries. In February 2017, he assumed the role as Chief Innovation & Strategy Officer at Philips Healthcare, a position he held until July 2021. He currently works on Strategic Business Development and is also a member of the executive committee at Royal Philips.

Prior to his current role, he was named CEO of Connected Care and Health Informatics in February 2016, a cluster of five Philips business groups focusing on patient monitoring and therapeutic care, population health, healthcare IT, healthcare transformation services and the development and deployment of the Philips HealthSuite cloud platform. Before that, Tas led the Philips Healthcare Informatics Solutions and Services Business Group.

== Education ==
Tas is a native of the Netherlands. He earned a master's degree in computer science and business administration from the Free University of Amsterdam.

== Career ==
In 1998, Tas and Jerry Rao co- founded MphasiS, an IT company, that later merged with Indian IT services company BFL Software Ltd. in 2000. MphasiS rose to be one of the top 10 IT/BPO companies in India. Tas also served as president, COO and vice-chairman of the board for MphasiS. In 2006, Electronic Data Systems (EDS) acquired MphasiS, and it is now majority-owned by Hewlett-Packard. At EDS, Tas served as vice president and general manager, responsible for the global competency centers.

Prior to his time at MphasiS and EDS, Tas was head of Transaction Technology, Inc., Citigroup's tech lab, responsible for the advancement of the bank's customer-facing systems.^{5} Under his leadership, he oversaw the deployment of the company's internet banking platform. While he was at Citigroup, Tas was a member of the Global Marketing Council and the Global Consumer Technology Group.

Since assuming his current role at Philips, Tas initiated pivotal partnerships with Qualcomm Life, Amazon Web Services, Salesforce and Pegasystems to support the building of a global Philips HealthSuite ecosystem for connected personal health and clinical care solutions. In 2015, Tas helped launch a new mobile diabetes monitoring system in conjunction with Radboud University Medical Center to offer patients an integrated health management system that is connected, efficient and patient-centric.

Tas has spoken at a number of high-profile events, including CES, WEF, Techonomy, Forbes Health Summit and Dreamforce.

== Awards ==
Tas was named the E&Y Entrepreneur of the Year in 2004 in the information technology category for the New York region.

He has also received a number of honors for his role as CIO, including CIO Magazine's CIO of the Year Award in 2013, NASSCOM Global CIO Award in 2014, World International Congress' 2014 CIO Leadership Award and European CIO of the Year Award in 2014.

Tas won the Accenture Innovation Award 2015 - Corporate Innovator of the Year
