= Aruna Jayanthi =

Indian businesswoman

- Education: SVKM's NMIMS
- Occupations: Managing Director, Capgemini's Asia Pacific and Latin America business unit, Board of Governors, NIT Calicut
- Spouse: Madhusudan Gopinath
- Children: 1

Aruna Jayanthi is an Indian businesswoman and managing director of Capgemini's Asia Pacific and Latin America business unit. Previously, she held roles as their CEO of Business Services and CEO of Capgemini India. Jayanthi joined Capgemini in 2000 and was part of the core team that initiated and set up the firm's offshore capabilities in India, eventually heading up their global outsourcing services. Jayanthi has been chairperson of the board of governors of National Institute of Technology Calicut since November 2014.

== Education ==
Jayanthi holds a master's degree in Management Studies in Finance from SVKM's NMIMS in 1984.

== Awards ==
Jayanthi was listed among Fortune India's 'Most Powerful Women' in 2011 and 2012, and Business Today's 'Most Powerful Women in Business' in 2011-2015 and 2017-2018. She received an 'India Today Woman Award' in 2013. Jayanthi is also an executive council member of NASSCOM.

== See also ==
- Roshni Nadar
