= SVKM's NMIMS =

University in Mumbai, India

- Former name: Narsee Monjee Institute of Management Studies
- Motto: Transcending Horizons
- Type: Private deemed university
- Established: 1981; 45 years ago
- Parent institution: Shri Vile Parle Kelavani Mandal
- Affiliations: AACSB; AMBA; UGC; AIU
- Chancellor: Amrish Patel
- Vice-Chancellor: Sougata Ray
- Faculty: 900
- Students: 40,000
- Location: V. L. Mehta Road, Vile Parle West, Mumbai, Maharashtra, 400056, India
- Campus: Urban
- Website: Official Website

Shri Vile Parle Kelavani Mandal's Narsee Monjee Institute of Management Studies (abbreviated as SVKM's NMIMS) is a private deemed university located in Mumbai. It has 17 constituent schools that offer both undergraduate and postgraduate courses in management, engineering, commerce, pharmacy, architecture, economics, mathematical sciences, hospitality, science, law, aviation, liberal arts, performing arts, architecture & design. It is accredited by NAAC with 3.67 CGPA and Grade A++. NMIMS was also awarded Category I University status by MoE.

== History ==
NMIMS University, established in 1981 by the Shri Vile Parle Kelavani Mandal (SVKM) in Mumbai, started as a modest institution offering a two-year full-time master's program in management studies. Initially housed in a small setup above Bhaidas Hall in Vile Parle, it had four full-time faculty members and a library of 3,162 books, catering to 40 students.

In the years following its inception, NMIMS rapidly expanded. By 2003, it achieved the status of a deemed university under the University Grants Commission (UGC) Act of 1956, allowing it to offer diverse programs across various disciplines.

== Academic Programs ==
NMIMS mainly offer undergraduate/postgraduate, postgraduate, doctoral, and executive education programs. Some programs offered by all NMIMS campuses are similar; however, some campuses offer unique programs for specialized purposes.

=== MBA Program ===
The two-year full-time MBA is spread over six trimesters and covers core subjects in the first year, followed by specialized electives in the second year. The curriculum is enriched with seminars, workshops, industry projects, and global exchange programs. Specializations include finance, marketing, operations, and human resources, with strong industry linkages enhancing the learning experience.

=== MBA in Business Analytics ===
This specialized MBA program combines business management education with advanced analytics. It includes courses on artificial intelligence, machine learning, and big data analytics, aiming to prepare students for roles that require data-driven decision-making. The curriculum emphasizes practical training through industry projects and internships, focusing on the application of analytical tools in business contexts.

=== Engineering Programs ===
Engineering disciplines offered include computer engineering, mechanical engineering, electronics and telecommunications.

=== Pharmacy Programs ===
The pharmacy programs include undergraduate, postgraduate, and doctoral courses in pharmacy and pharmaceutical technology. These programs focus on research, clinical practice, and industry-relevant training. The curriculum is designed to equip students with skills for careers in the pharmaceutical industry, healthcare sector, and academic research.

=== Law Programs ===
NMIMS offers integrated law programs such as BA LLB and BBA LLB, as well as LLM courses. These programs provide education in legal principles, supported by practical training through moot courts and internships.

=== Commerce and Economics Programs ===
The School of Commerce offers undergraduate programs like BBA, Bsc. Finance, BBA Fintech and BCom (Hons), while the School of Economics provides a BA in Economics. These programs aim to provide an education in financial principles, economic theories, and analytical skills.

=== Liberal Arts and Design Programs ===
The liberal arts program covers a broad spectrum of subjects including humanities, social sciences, and natural sciences, while the design program focuses on areas such as communication design, interior design, and industrial design.

=== PSA ===
While other schools/institutions bear the name "Narsee" they are not a part of Shri Vile Parle Kelavani Mandal The SVKM institutions are 1) Narsee Monjee Institute of Management Studies (N.M.I.M.S.) 2) Narsee Monjee College of Commerce & Economics (N.M.) 3) Chatrabhuj Narsee Memorial School Vile Parle (C.N.M. SCHOOL & N. D. PAREKH PRE-PRIMARY)

== Campuses ==
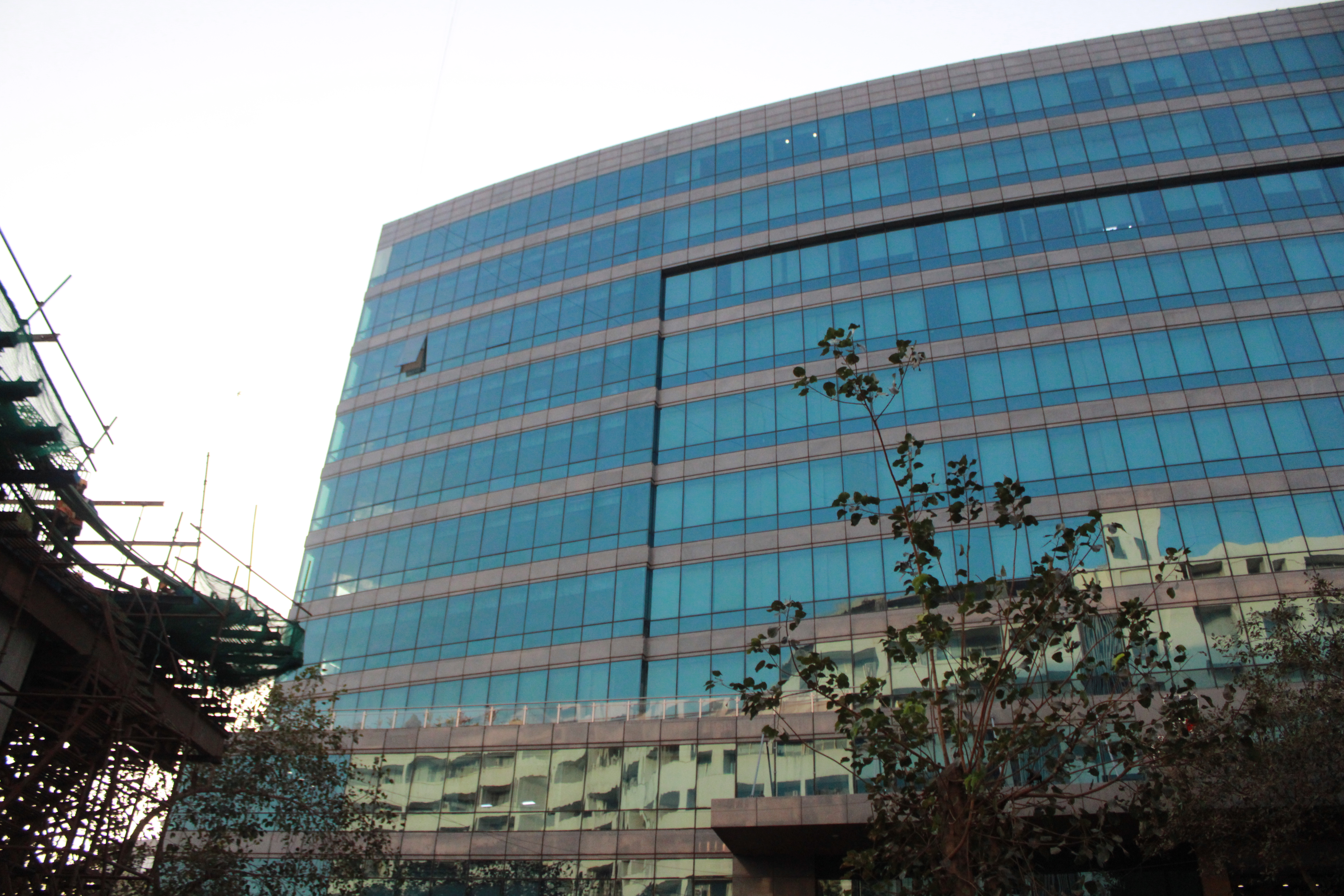
NMIMS Mumbai during late afternoons

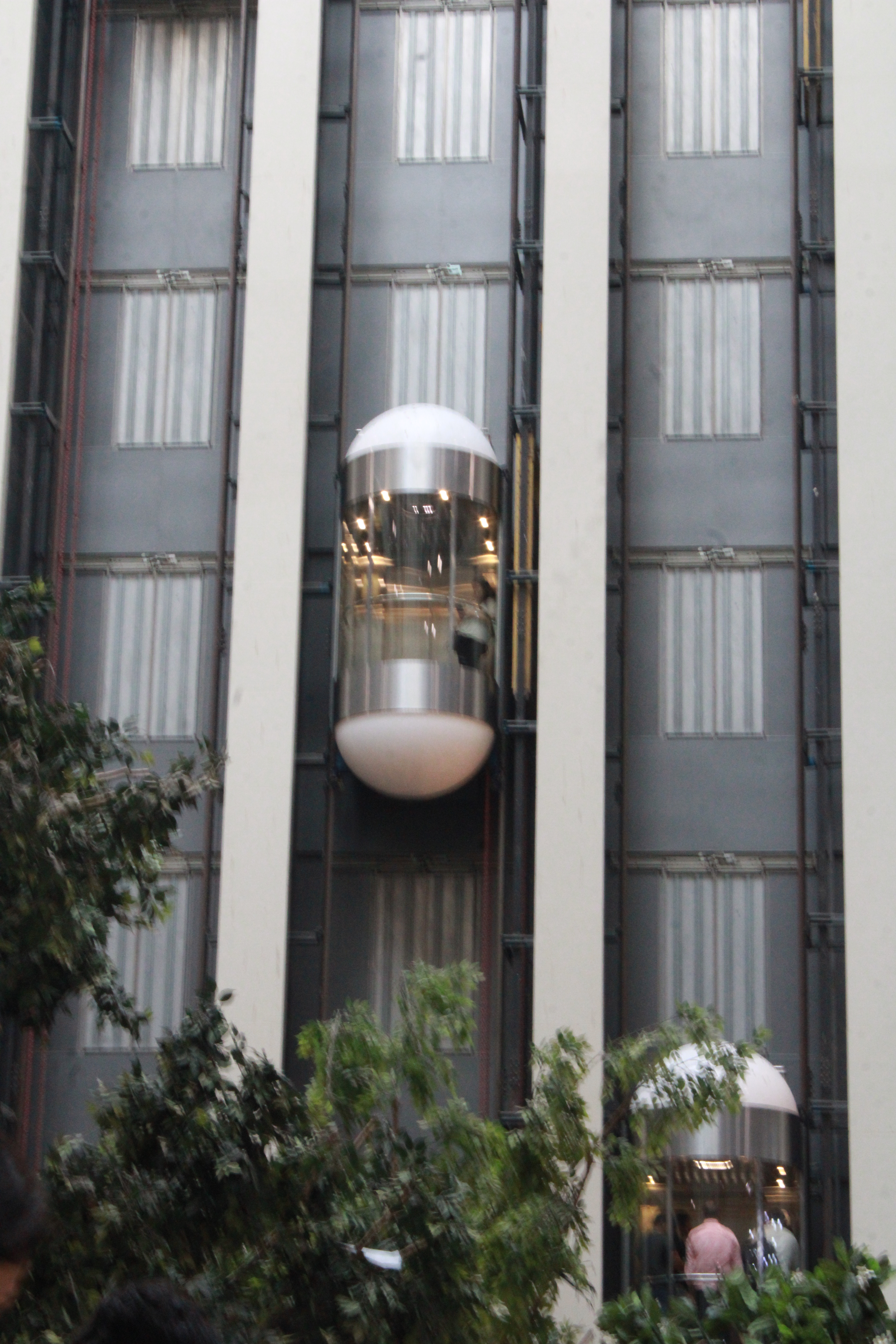
Capsule Lift inside the Mumbai campus

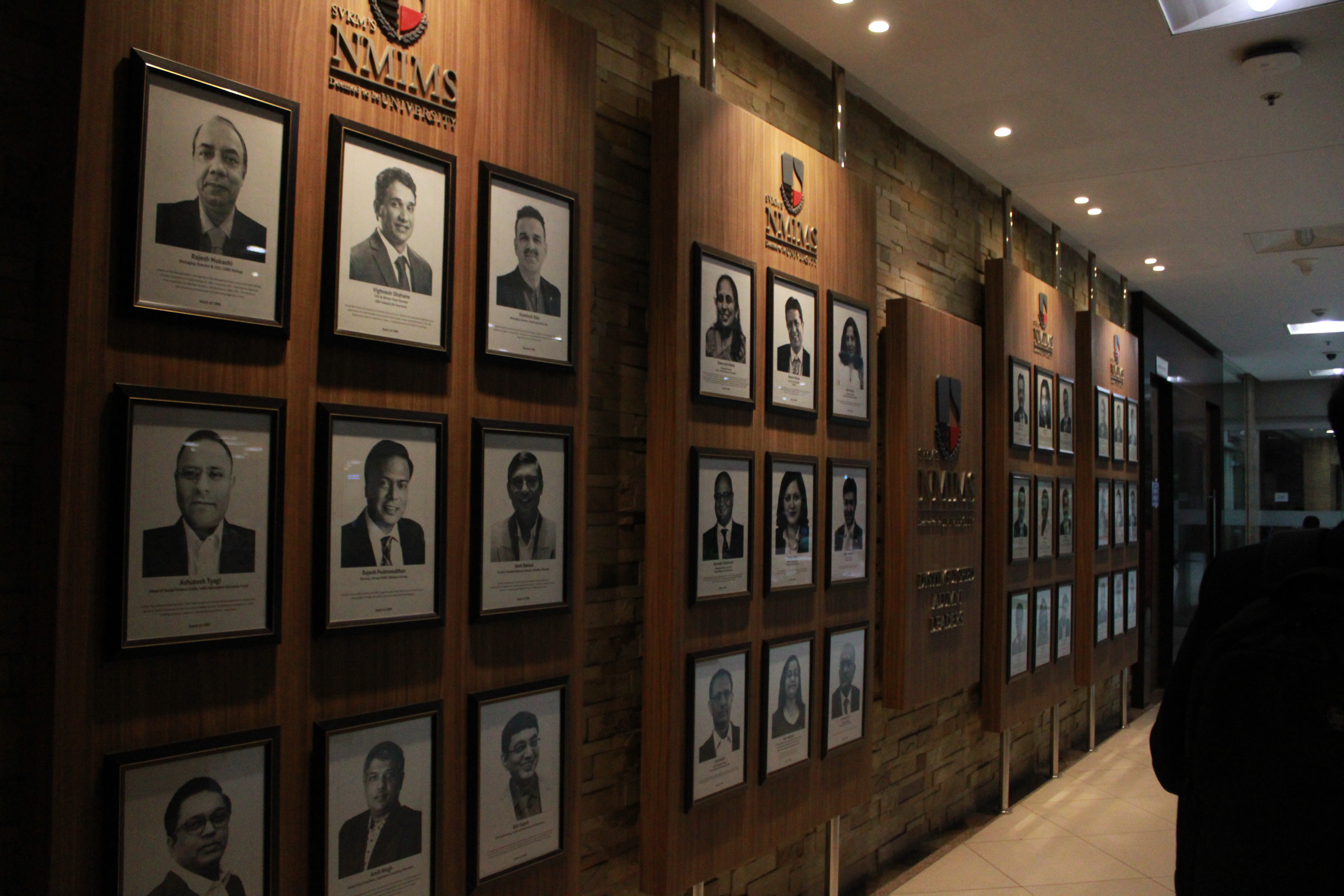
A dimly lit photo of NMIMs Alumnus

Campus	Est.	Schools
Mumbai	1981	1. School of Business Management, Mumbai; 2. Centre of Excellence in Analytics & Data Science; 3. Mukesh Patel School of Technology Management & Engineering; 4. Anil Surendra Modi School of Commerce; 5. Pravin Dalal School of Entrepreneurship and Family Business Management; 6. Kirit P. Mehta School of Law; 7. Nilkamal School of Mathematics Applied Statistics & Analytics; 8. Sarla Anil Modi School of Economics; 9. Shobhaben Pratapbhai Patel School of Pharmacy & Technology Management; 10. Sunandan Divatia School of Science; 11. School of Performing Arts; 12. School of Branding and Advertising; 13. Balwant Seth School of Architecture; 14. Jyoti Dalal School of Liberal Arts; 15. School of Design; 16. NMIMS Centre for Distance and Online Education (NMIMS CDOE)
Shirpur	2007	1. Mukesh Patel School of Technology Management & Engineering; 2. School of Pharmacy & Technology Management; 3. Academy of Aviation
Bangalore	2008	1. School of Business Management (MBA); 2. School of Economics; 3. School of Commerce; 4. School of Law; 5. School of Science
Hyderabad	2010	1. School of Science; 2. School of Commerce; 3. School of Pharmacy and Technology Management; 4. School of Technology Management and Engineering; 5. School of Law
Navi Mumbai	2017	1. School of Commerce; 2. School of Technology Management & Engineering; 3. School of Science; 4. School of Business Management; 5. School of Hotel Management; 6. School of Law
Indore	2017	1. School of Business Management; 2. School of Commerce; 3. School of Law; 4. School of Technology Management
Dhule	2018	1. School of Commerce; 2. School of Law
Chandigarh	2021	1. School of Technology Management & Engineering; 2. School of Commerce; 3. School of Law

== Controversies & Legal developments ==
- NMIMS was barred by the University Grants Commission from offering distance learning and online courses in February 2023 for offering Online courses without UGC approval. Some other reasons include inadequate faculties and non-teaching staff, and low quality of Self-learning Material. However, the ban was lifted in August 2024 after NMIMS complied with the norms.
- In June 2025, the Bombay High Court advised SVKM's NMIMS to consider a reformative approach and grant a second chance to two first-year MBA students whose admissions had been cancelled for tampering with their mid-term corporate finance exam papers. Despite the misconduct, the court took into account the students' remorse and psychological trauma, suggesting that the institution reevaluate its decision rather than uphold strict punitive measures. The matter remains pending further hearings and potential re-examinations.

== Notable alumni ==
- John Abraham - Actor and Producer
- Saniya Anklesaria - child actor
- Vikas Bahl - film director
- Deven Bhojani - actor, director
- Avani Davda - MD, Nature's Basket
- Dhvani Desai - animation filmmaker and poet
- Harish Iyer - LGBT activist
- Anuv Jain - Singer
- Kiran Janjani - actor
- Aruna Jayanthi - CEO (Business Service), Capgemini
- Payal Shah Karwa - author
- Deena Mehta - MD and CEO, Asit C. Mehta Investment Interrmediates
- Vedang Raina - actor
- Nitin Rakesh - CEO and director, Mphasis
- Sundar Raman - president, Reliance Sports
- Kunal Shah - Enterpreneur (dropped out from NMIMS MBA) Ex Founder of FreePaisa, Free Charge & Founder of CRED & CEO of Whatsapp
- Shreya Shanker - model and runner up in Femina Miss India 2019
- Shilpa Singh - model & runner-up in I Am She–Miss Universe India 2012
- Rhea Chavan - CR for Btech CSE Cybersecurity Batch 2027
