= Syntel =

Multinational company

Syntel Private Limited
- Type: Private
- Industry: IT services, IT consulting
- Founded: 1980; 46 years ago, in Troy, Michigan, US
- Founder: Bharat Desai; Neerja Sethi
- Defunct: 2018
- Fate: Acquired
- Successor: Atos
- Headquarters: Troy, Michigan
- Key people: Rakesh Khanna (CEO); Anil Agrawal (CFO); Srinath Mallya (CIO)
- Services: Outsourcing; Consulting; Managed services
- Revenue: ▲US$881 million (2021)
- Net income: ▲US$243 million (2021)
- Total assets: ▲US$1.1 billion (2021)
- Parent: Atos
- Website: syntelinc.com at the Wayback Machine (archived 2015-03-15)

Syntel Private Limited, was a multinational provider of integrated technology and business services. The company was led by Rakesh Khanna. Atos Syntel was created by the acquisition of Syntel Private Limited by Atos S.E., which was announced on July 22, 2018, and completed on October 9, 2018. The subsidiary was later dissolved into Atos itself.

== Business ==
Syntel Private Limited operates its business through four segments: Application Outsourcing, Knowledge Process Outsourcing, e-Business and TeamSourcing. The Application Outsourcing segment provides outsourcing services for ongoing management, development and maintenance of customer's business applications. The Knowledge Process Outsourcing segment provides outsourced solutions for a customer's business processes, providing them with the process enhancement through optimal use of technology. The e-Business segment provides development and implementation services for a number of emerging and rapidly growing technology applications, including web development, data warehousing, e-commerce, CRM, Oracle and SAP, as well as partnership agreements with software providers. The TeamSourcing segment provides professional information technology consulting services directly to customers on a staff augmentation basis and its services include systems specification, design, development, implementation and maintenance of complex information technology applications involving diverse computer hardware, software, data and networking technologies and practices.
