= Ganesh Ayyar =

Indian executive

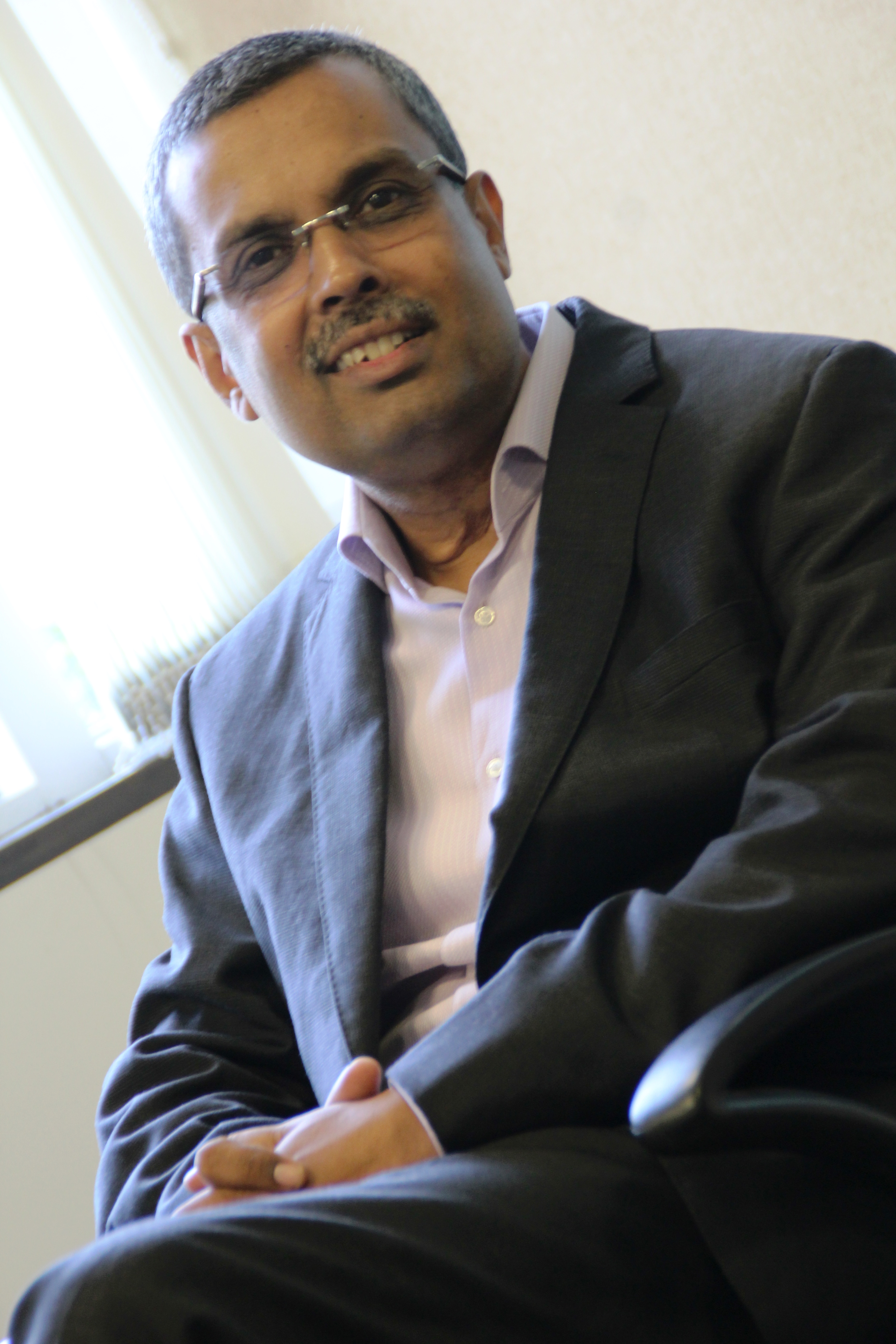
- Born: Balu Ganesh Ayyar; 1961 (age 64–65)
- Education: Guru Nanak College, Chennai

Balu Ganesh Ayyar (born 1961) is an Indian executive. He is the former CEO of Mphasis.

== Early life ==
Ayyar was born in Madhya Pradesh to Professor S.A. Balu and Brinda Balu. He finished his schooling in Madhya Pradesh and went on to complete his B.Com from Guru Nanak College, Chennai. He participated in debates and writing plays. He completed his chartered accountancy in 1985.

== Career ==
On 29 January 2009, Ayyar was appointed as CEO and executive director at Mphasis. Ayyar was involved with refreshing Mphasis's brand identity with the tagline ‘Unleash the Next’ in 2014. The $1 billion-plus IT services company has been looking at non HP related projects in banking, capital markets and insurance verticals to offset the drop in business from its parent company Hewlett Packard (HP). During his tenure, the company has acquired AIGSS, Fortify, Wyde Corporation, Digital Risk.

Some of the initiatives undertaken at Mphasis during Ayyar's tenure include the launch of Kick Start Cabs, a cab service for senior citizens and people with disabilities, and partnership with Lokalex for a pilot program in rural education through IT.

In 2013, he was among the top 5 paid CEOs in India from the IT sector.

Ayyar is joining Cognizant as EVP for digital operations from 1 August 2019.

== Awards ==
- 2010: NDTV Profit Business Leadership Award
- 2011: Asia's Viewers Choice Award – CNBC Asia
- 2011: India Talent management award at the CNBC TV18
- 2015: Innovation and Excellence Award from Corporate Livewire
- 2016: Mid-Market CEO of the Year’ from CEO Connection Mid-market awards.
