= Judhajit Bagchi and Ranadeep Bhattacharyya =

Judhajit Bagchi and Ranadeep Bhattacharyya are Indian film director, producer and screenwriter duo. In 2019 their short film Children of the Soil have won the 66th National Film Awards in Best Audiography. They have directed and produced the film Amen (2010) inspired from the life of the human right activist Harish Iyer. In 2011 Amen was selected as the only Indian film on the Iris Prize, also known as the 'gay Oscars', list of 30 top LGBT films from across the globe.

In 2015 and 2016, they have won the Cannes Corporate media and TV award and the International Business Award (Stevie Award). They are the first and only Indian filmmakers to win these awards in consecutive years.
