= Kala Ghoda Arts Festival =

Annual Arts Festival in Mumbai, India

Kala Ghoda Arts Festival (KGAF)
- Status: Active
- Genre: Arts festival
- Frequency: Annually
- Locations: Kala Ghoda, Mumbai, India
- Years active: 1999–present
- Inaugurated: 1999; 27 years ago
- Most recent: 25 January 2025 to 2 February 2025
- Attendance: 800,000 - 1,000,000
- Patron: Sangita Jindal
- Organiser: Kala Ghoda Association
- People: Brinda Miller
- Website: kalaghodaassociation.com

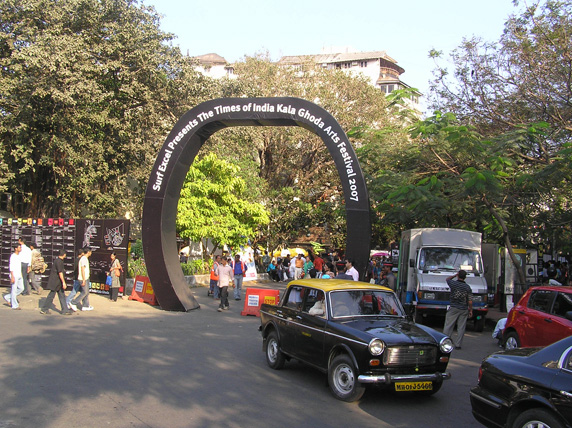
Kala Ghoda Arts Festival entrance, 2007

The Kala Ghoda Arts Festival is annual festival, nine days long, commencing always on the first Saturday of February and closing is always on the second Sunday in February, in the Kala Ghoda area of South Mumbai, India.

From its inception in 1999, the Festival has grown in stature and popularity, attracting visitors and participants from other parts of the country, and the world. The Festival is organised by the Kala Ghoda Association (a non-profit organisation that states its objectives as "physically upgrading the Kala Ghoda sub-precinct and making it the Art District of Mumbai") and curated by teams handling each of the 12 sections of the festival.

== Overview ==
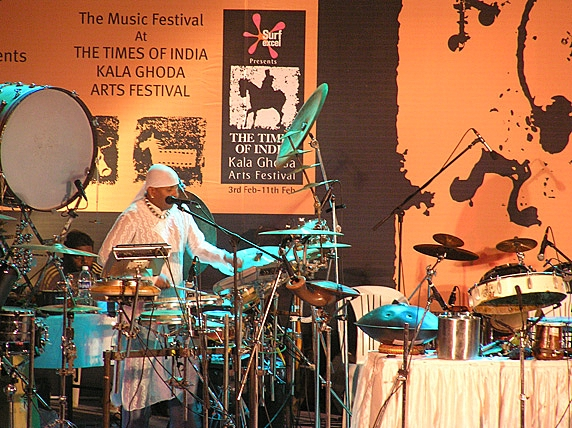
Sivamani, acclaimed percussionist at the Kala Ghoda festival, 2007

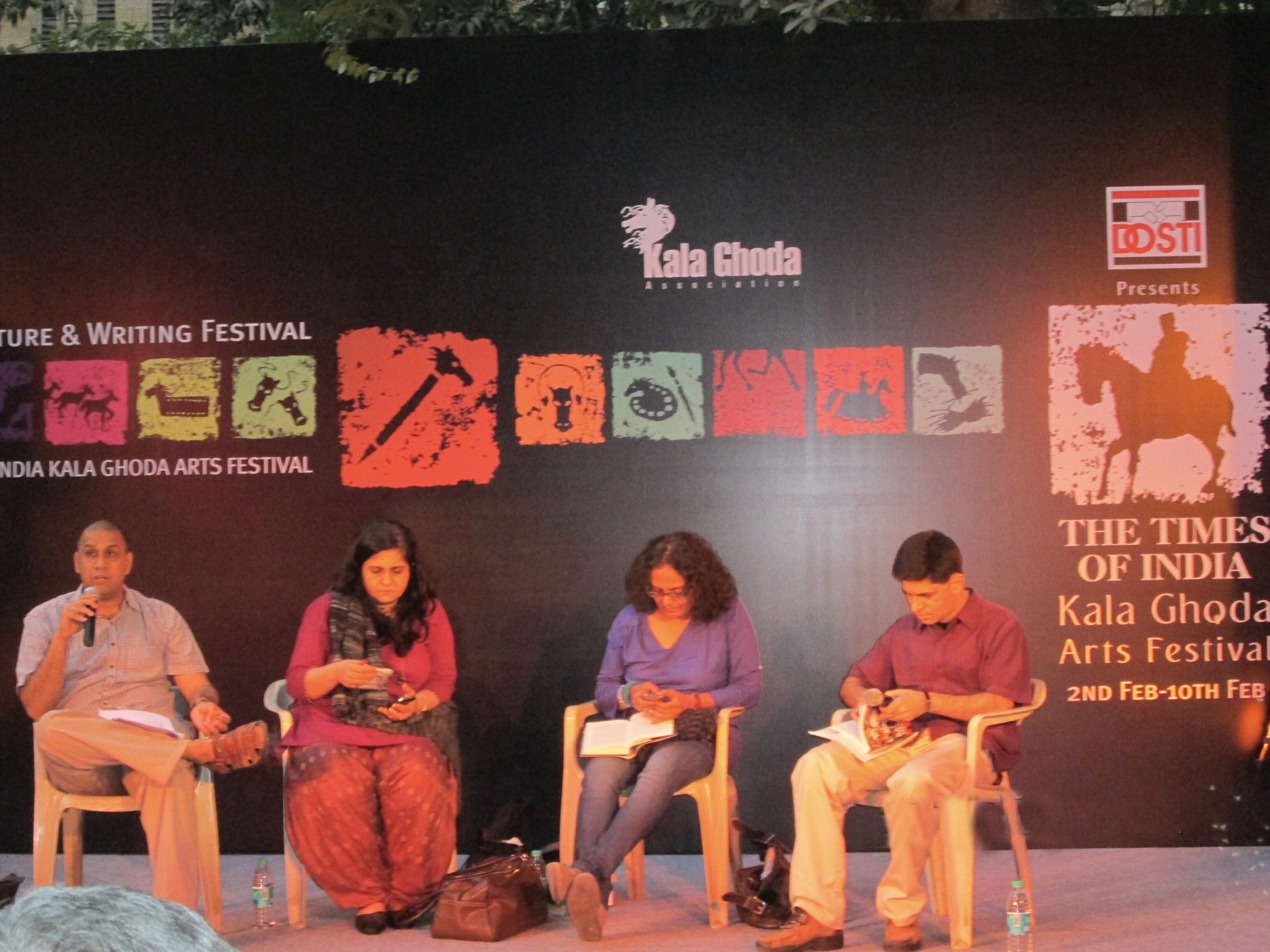
'Literature Discussions' at David Sassoon Library during 'Kala Ghoda Festival', 2008

The festival sections are visual arts, dance, music, theatre, cinema, literature including children's literature, as a sub-section, workshops, heritage walks, urban design and architecture (2014), food, a dedicated section for children, and a vibrant street section, including stalls selling eco-friendly, hand made arts and crafts wares. Entry to all events is free to all (only restricted by the size of the venues), and costs are met through corporate sponsorship. Venues include The auditorium at the National Gallery of Modern Art, the garden at the David Sassoon Library, the lawns and the auditoriums at the CSMVS, The Museum, Mumbai, the Cross Maidan, the Horniman Circle garden, the M C Ghia Hall, the Cafeteria at Westside, the Tata store at Army and Navy Building, the Max Mueller Bhavan (MMB) Gallery and the entire street area of Kaikashru Dubash Marg and its parking lot, popularly called Rampart Row. Rampart Row is closed off to vehicular traffic for the duration of the festival, with the entire area becoming a street mela, with food stalls, artisans selling their creations, artists who sketch instant portraits, street art installations and the like. In recent years, the Festival has expanded beyond the Kala Ghoda crescent, with events being held in Cross Maidan and Horniman Circle as well.

The success of the Kala Ghoda Arts Festival has, arguably, encouraged the setting up of several other arts and cultural festivals at that time of the year, when the weather in Mumbai is cool and the sun sets early. These include the Mumbai Festival, the Celebrate Bandra Festival, and in 2007, the Kitab Festival. The festival has also featured noticeable music acts like Spencer Maybe, Indus Creed, Benny Dayal and Ustad Zakir Hussain.

== Kala Ghoda Arts Festival 2012 ==
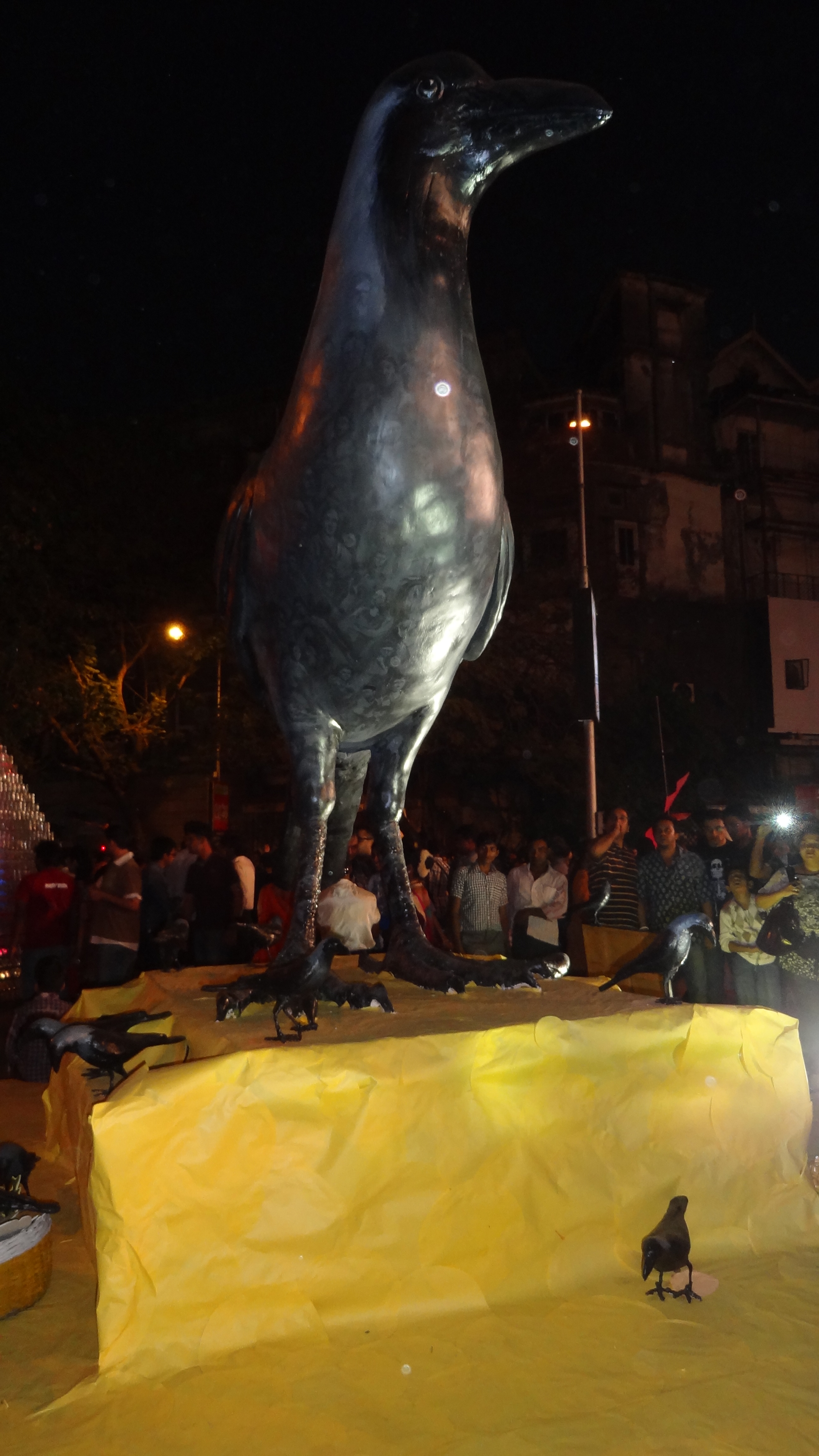
Giant Crow

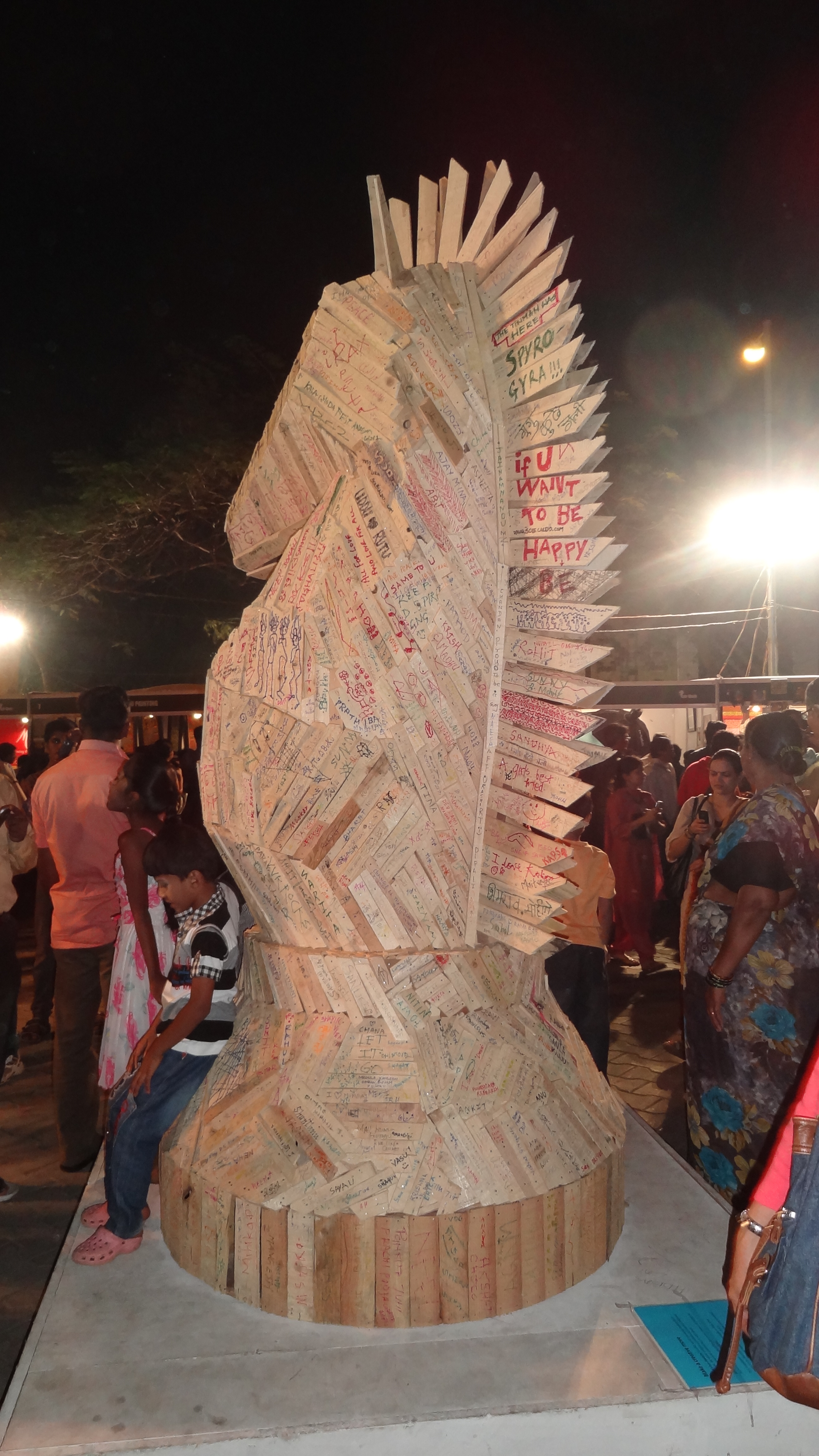
Horse

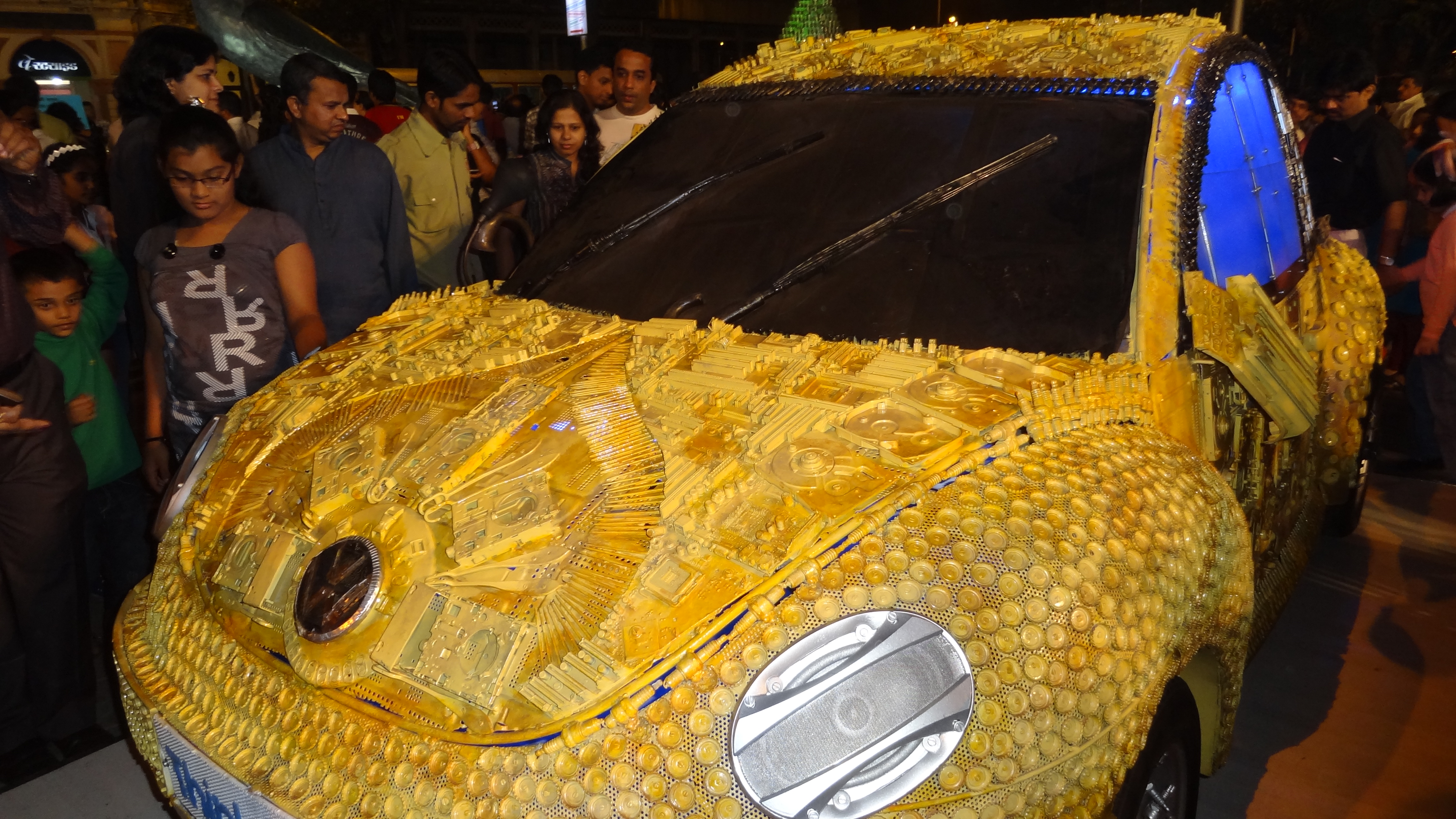
Electronic VW Mini

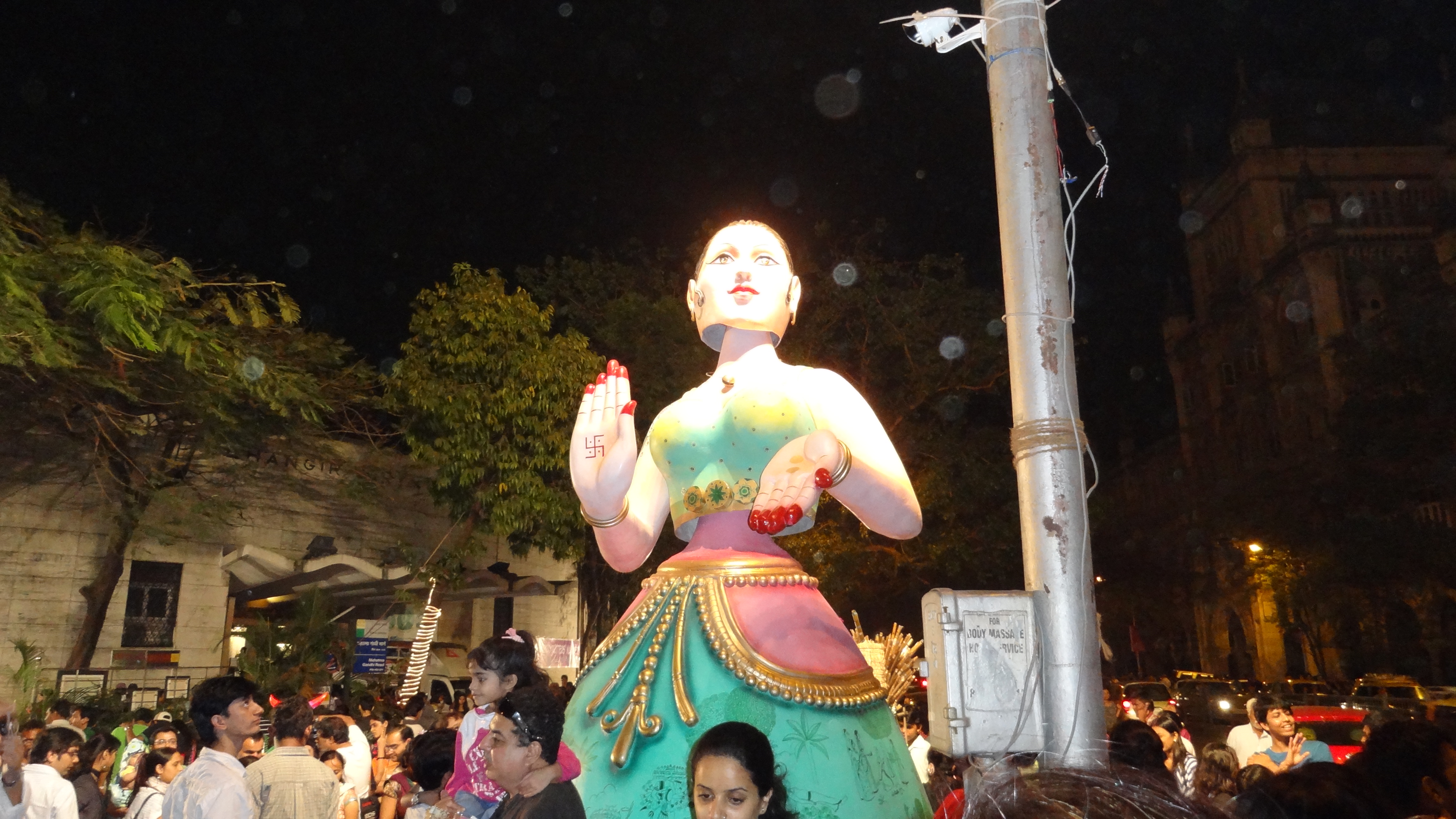
Dancing Girl

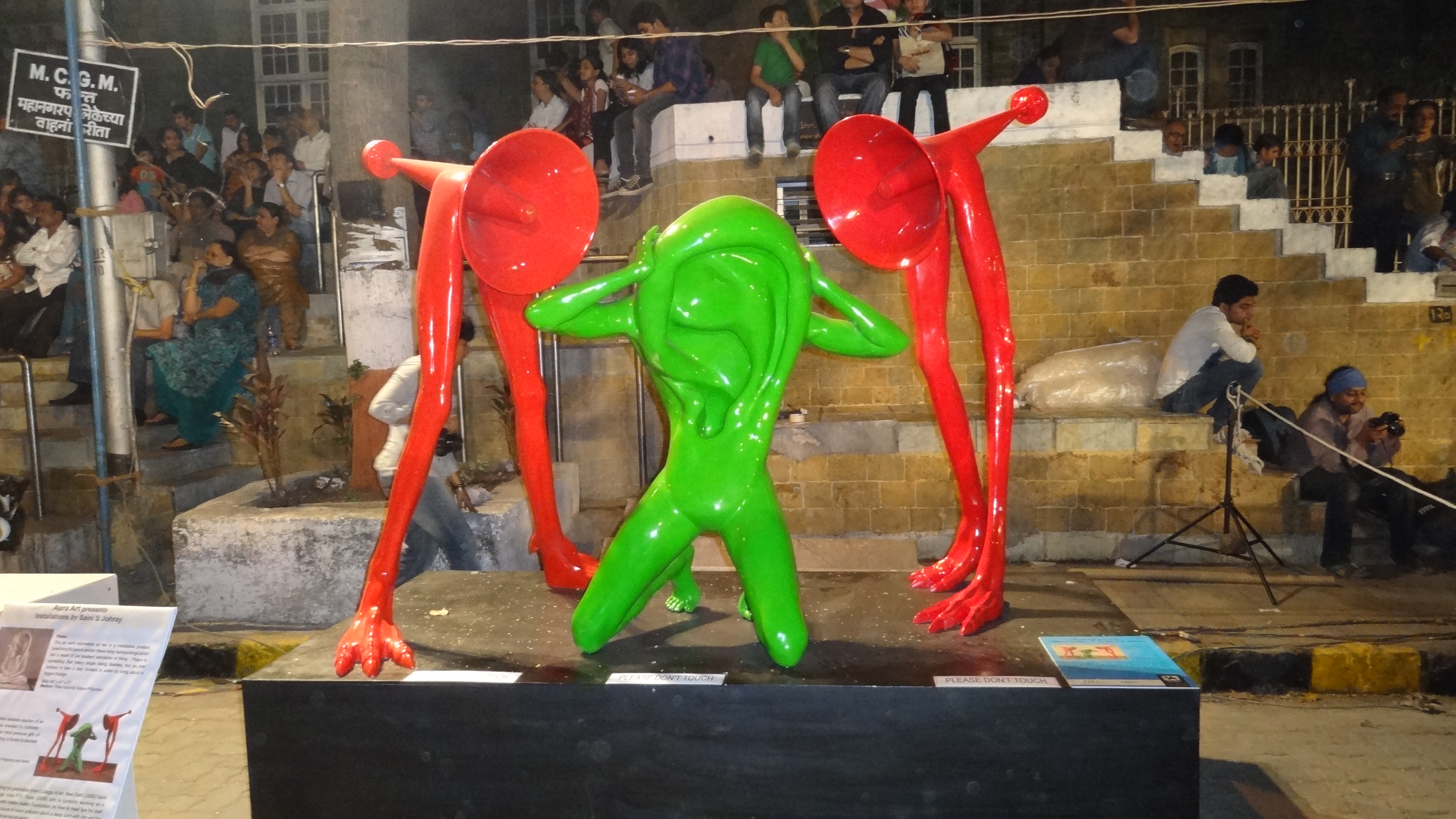
Noise all around

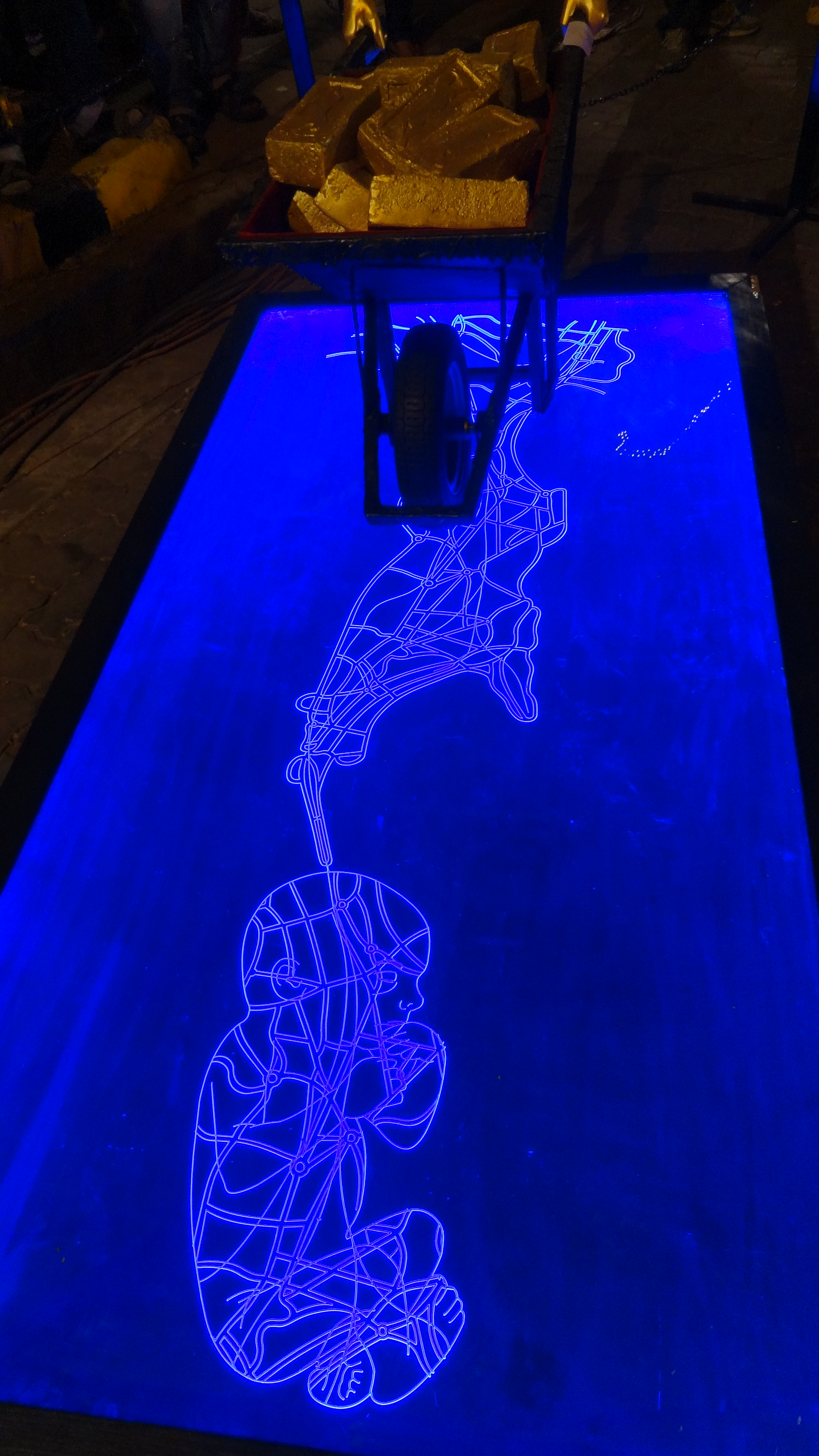
Sand Art
