= Kitab Festival =

Kitab
- Genre: Literary festival
- Location: India

Kitab is an annual international festival of literature, poetry, media and arts. Every year, it takes place in a different city in India.
