= Brinda Miller =

Indian artist

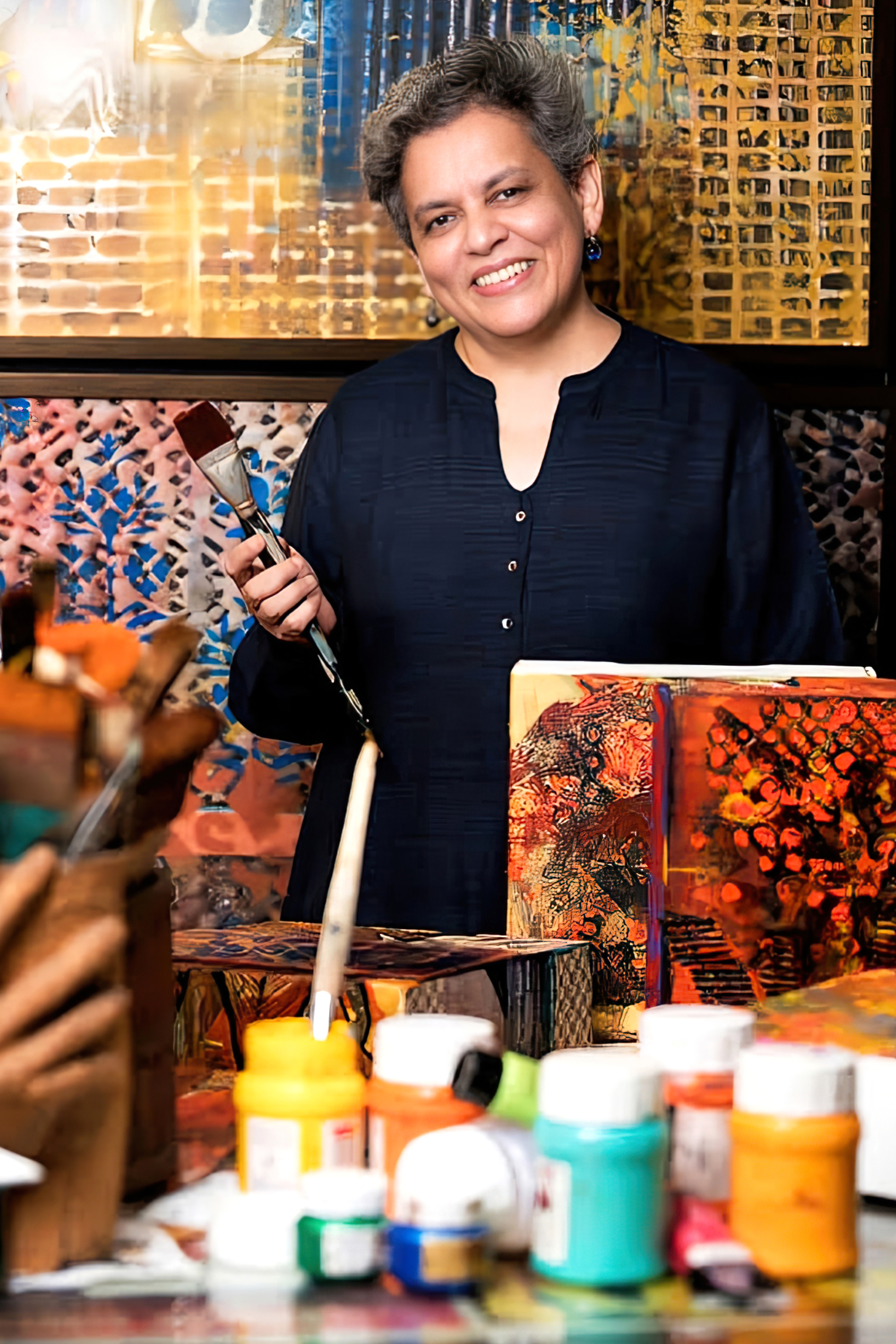
- Kala Ghoda Arts Festival
- Born: 16 March 1960 (age 66); Mumbai, India
- Education: Queen Mary School; Sir J. J. School of Art; Parsons School of Design
- Known for: Kala Ghoda Arts Festival
- Website: www.brindamiller.com

Brinda Miller (born 16 March 1960) is an Indian contemporary visual artist, cultural administrator, and festival director based in Mumbai. She has held a long-standing leadership role at the Kala Ghoda Arts Festival, one of Asia's largest multidisciplinary street arts festivals, held annually in Mumbai.

== Early life and education ==
Brinda Miller was born on 16 March 1960 in Mumbai, India. She completed her schooling at Queen Mary School, Mumbai. She studied Textile Design at the Sir J. J. School of Art, Mumbai, and later pursued Drawing and Painting at the Parsons School of Design, in New York. Her education in both Indian and international institutions has influenced her artistic practice, particularly her engagement with materiality, surface, and architectural form.

== Personal life ==
Brinda Miller is married to architect Alfaz Miller. The couple has two daughters, Aahana Miller and Aashti Miller.

== Career ==
Miller works as a contemporary visual artist whose practice explores urban landscapes, architectural memory, and public spaces. Her work has been exhibited in solo and group exhibitions in India and internationally, and forms part of private collections. Alongside her studio practice, she has been actively involved in public art initiatives and cultural programming, contributing to the integration of art into urban and community spaces.

== Kala Ghoda Arts Festival ==
Brinda Miller has been associated with the Kala Ghoda Arts Festival for over two decades and has served as its Honorary Festival Director and as Honorary Chairperson of the Kala Ghoda Association.

During her tenure, the festival expanded in scale and scope, encompassing visual arts, theatre, music, dance, literature, cinema, heritage walks, and public discourse. Media coverage has credited her with strengthening the festival's emphasis on accessibility, public participation, and the use of streets and public spaces as cultural venues.

She has spoken extensively about the festival's origins and its role in preserving Mumbai's artistic and architectural heritage while fostering community engagement.

== Philanthropy and cultural advocacy ==
Miller is involved in cultural philanthropy and advocacy for public art, heritage conservation, and art education. Through her honorary roles at the Kala Ghoda Association and the Kala Ghoda Arts Festival, she has supported initiatives aimed at promoting art appreciation and community engagement.
