= Mphasis =

Indian multinational IT services company

Mphasis Limited
- Type: Public
- Traded as: BSE: 526299; NSE: MPHASIS
- Industry: Information technology Consulting; Outsourcing
- Founded: 1998; 28 years ago
- Founders: Jerry Rao; Jeroen Tas
- Headquarters: Bengaluru, Karnataka, India
- Key people: Nitin Rakesh (CEO)
- Revenue: ▲₹14,484 crore (US$1.5 billion) (2025)
- Operating income: ▲₹2,260 crore (US$240 million) (2025)
- Net income: ▲₹1,702 crore (US$180 million) (2025)
- Owner: Blackstone (39.85%)
- Number of employees: 31,645 (June 2024)
- Website: www.mphasis.com
- Footnotes; Financials as of 31 March 2025.

Mphasis Limited is an Indian multinational information technology service and consulting company based in Bengaluru. The company provides infrastructure technology and applications outsourcing services, as well as architecture guidance, application development and integration, and application management services. It serves financial services, telecom, logistics, and technology industries. Mphasis was ranked #7 in Indian IT companies and overall #189 by Fortune India 500 in 2019. In April 2016, Hewlett Packard Enterprise sold the majority of its stake in Mphasis to Blackstone Group LP for around US$1 billion.

== History ==
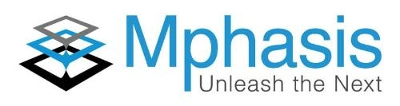
Old logo of Mphasis

=== Formation and early years ===
Mphasis was formed in June 2000 after the merger of the US-based IT consulting company Mphasis Corporation (founded in 1998 in Santa Monica by Jerry Rao and Jeroen Tas.) and the Indian IT services company BFL Software Limited (founded in 1992).

In June 2006 Electronic Data Systems (EDS) purchased a controlling stake in the company (42%) for $380 million and operated the company as an independent EDS unit.

=== As a Hewlett-Packard company ===
On 13 May 2008, Hewlett-Packard confirmed that it had reached a deal with Electronic Data Systems and Magnetic System to acquire the company for $13.9 billion. The deal was completed on 26 August 2008.

In September 2009, Mphasis changed its brand identity by dropping EDS association to become "Mphasis, an HP Company" after HP retired EDS Brand to become "HP Enterprise Services". Mphasis operated as an independent HP subsidiary with its own board and continued to be listed on Indian markets as "Mphasis Limited". HP owned close to 62% in Mphasis and Mphasis got around 50% of its revenues from HP.

Mphasis marked $1 billion in revenues and registered a consolidated revenue of RS 50.37 billion ($1,099.3 million) for the year ended 31 October 2010 becoming the sixth Indian IT company to do that.

In February 2014, Mphasis changed its logo and the brand name as Mphasis Unleash the Next, seeking to boost business other than from parent Hewlett-Packard, its largest client.

On 30 June 2015, Mphasis announced the signing of a definitive agreement to transfer a significant portion of its domestic business, to Hinduja Global Solutions (HGS). On 10 July 2015, Mphasis announced it will move 2,000 employees to Karvy Data Management Services Ltd (KDMSL) as part of a deal signed to partially sell its domestic outsourcing business to Karvy.

=== Under Blackstone Group ===
In 2016, after Hewlett-Packard announced plans to sell its controlling stakes in Mphasis, three companies Tech Mahindra, Apollo Global Management and Blackstone Group entered the race to acquire Mphasis. Tech Mahindra emerged as the frontrunner before it decided to pull out in order to avoid a bidding war with other companies. Later that year, Blackstone acquired Hewlett-Packard's 60.17% stake in Mphasis for ₹5,466 crore ($815 million); Blackstone's subsequent open offer to acquire an additional 26% from public shareholders failed.

On 29 January 2017, Nitin Rakesh joined Mphasis as the chief executive officer and director. On 7 Aug 2018, the Mphasis Board announced a buyback offer for its shareholders at an approximate premium of 17.4%.

In April 2021, Blackstone committed up to $2.8 billion to acquire controlling stake in Mphasis. A wholly owned subsidiary of the Abu Dhabi Investment Authority (ADIA), UC Investments and other long-term investors will be co-investing along with Blackstone.

== Company ==
=== Offices ===
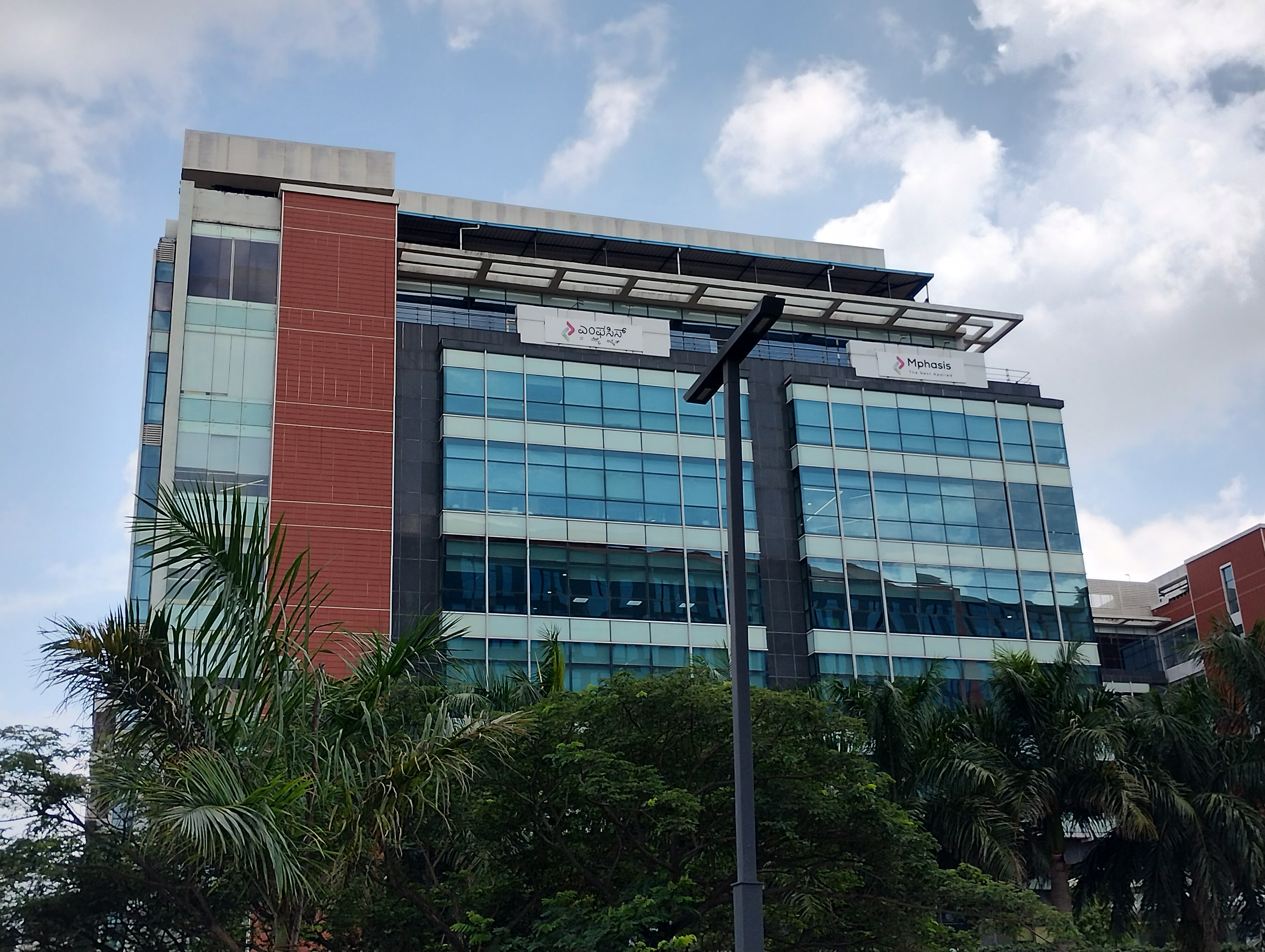
Mphasis at Bagmane Tech Park, Bangalore

Mphasis has more than 60 sales and delivery centers in India, US, UK, China, Australia, Canada, Japan, France, Germany, Netherlands, Belgium, Ireland, Poland, Sweden, Switzerland, Hungary, Singapore, Indonesia, Tunisia, Mauritius, New Zealand, Taiwan, Mexico, Costa Rica, Argentina, Malaysia, Philippines and Saudi Arabia. In India, it has centers in Bangalore, Chennai, Pune, Hyderabad, Mumbai, Noida and Mangalore.

=== Acquisitions ===
- Navion Software, China (2002)
- Kshema Technologies, Bangalore, India (2004)
- Onida Infotech Services (Mirc Electronics SAP Division), Mumbai, India (2004)
- Princeton Consulting, UK (2005)
- Eldorado Computing, US (2005)
- AIG Systems Solutions, India (2009)
- Fortify Infrastructure Services, US (2010)
- Wyde Corporation, US (2011)
- Digital Risk LLC, US (2012)
- Stelligent, US (2018)
- Datalytyx (2020)
- Blink UX (2021)

=== Mergers ===
- BFL Software and MphasiS (March 2001)

== Recognition ==
From 2019 to 2025, the company was included in the Fortune India 500 list.

== See also ==
- List of IT consulting firms
- List of Indian IT companies
- Electronic Data Systems
- Hewlett-Packard
- HP Enterprise Services
