= List of Indian IT companies =

List of notable IT companies in India

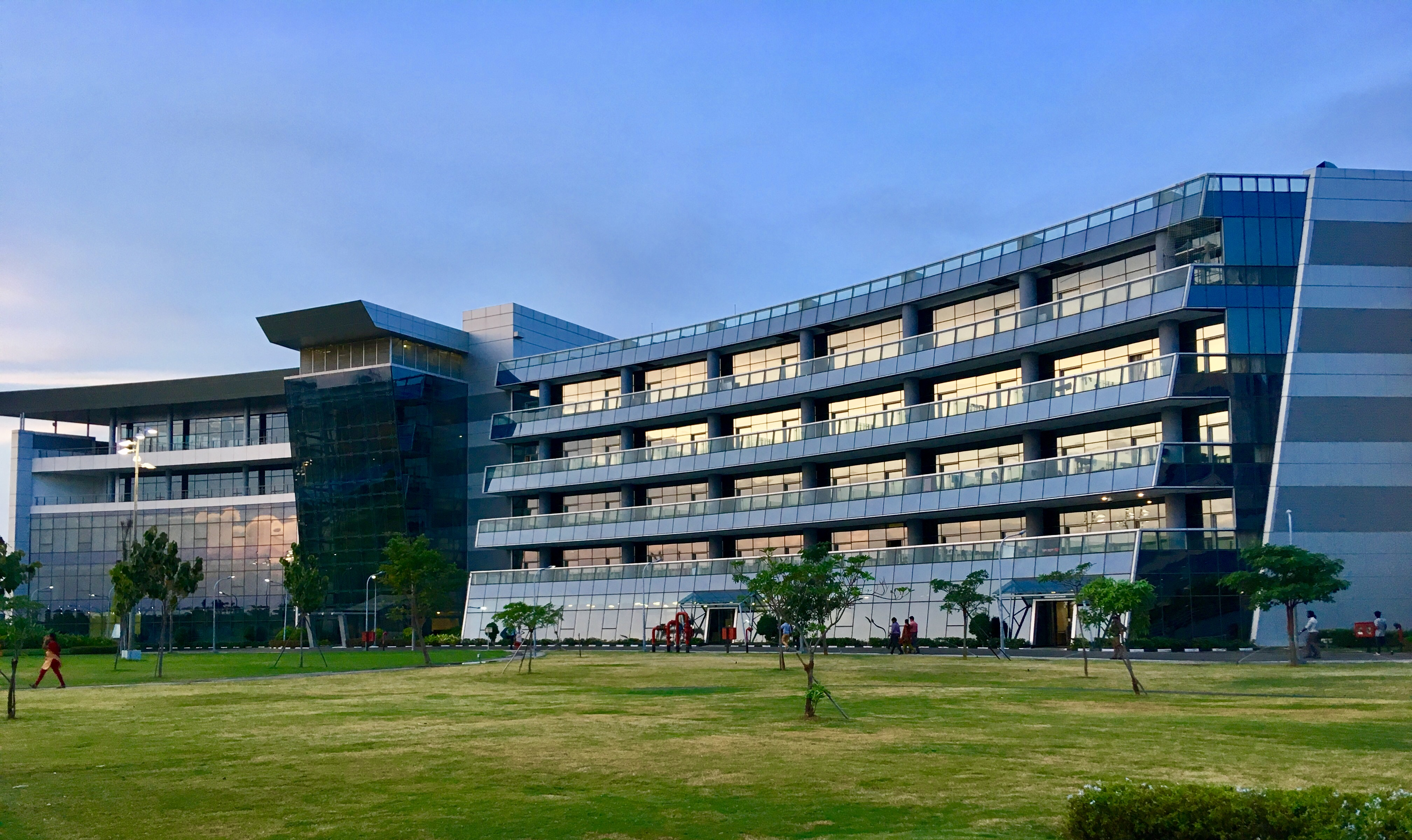
TCS office at SIPCOT, Siruseri

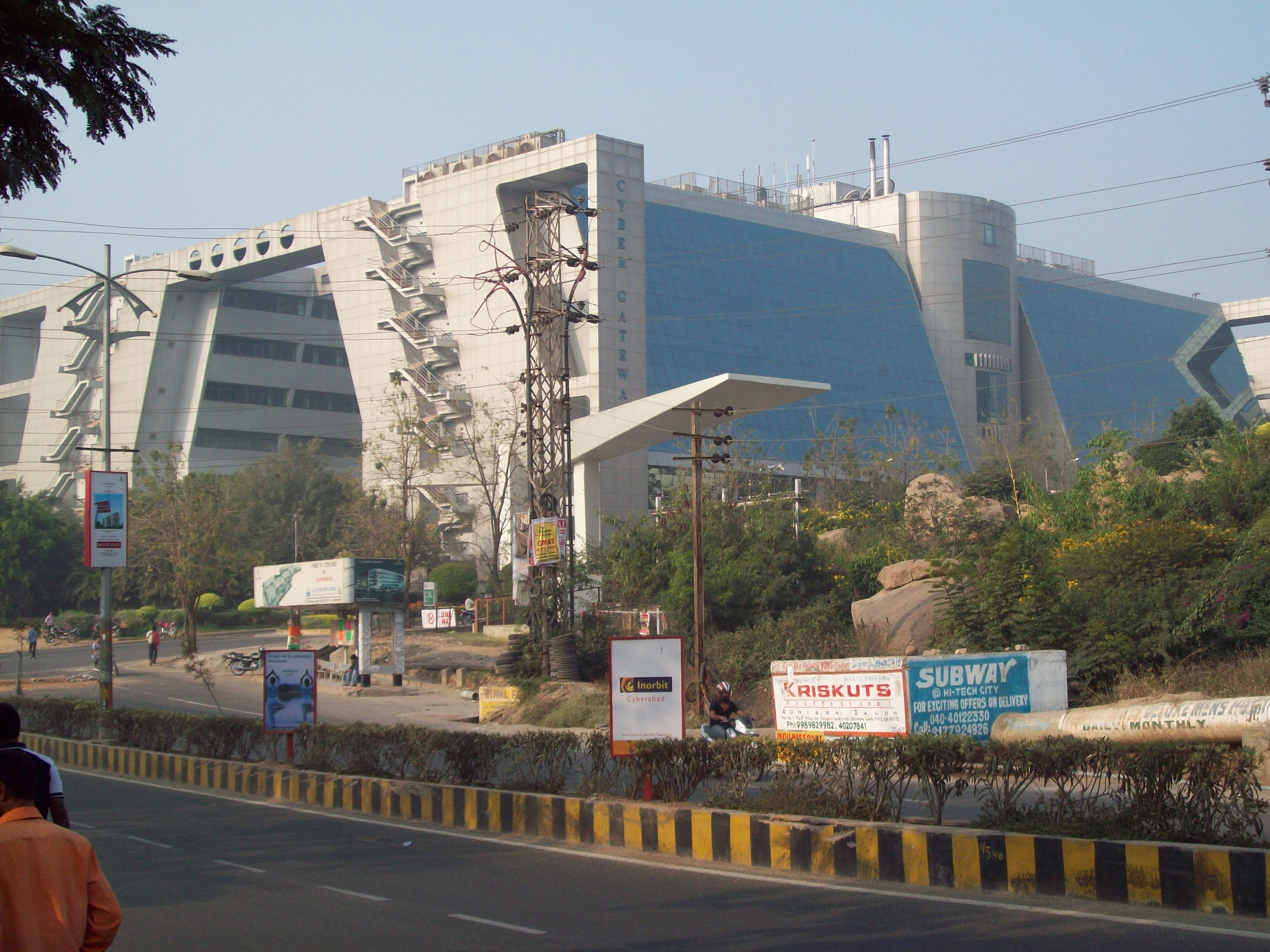
Cyber Gateway Madhapur Hyderabad near Raheja Mindspace

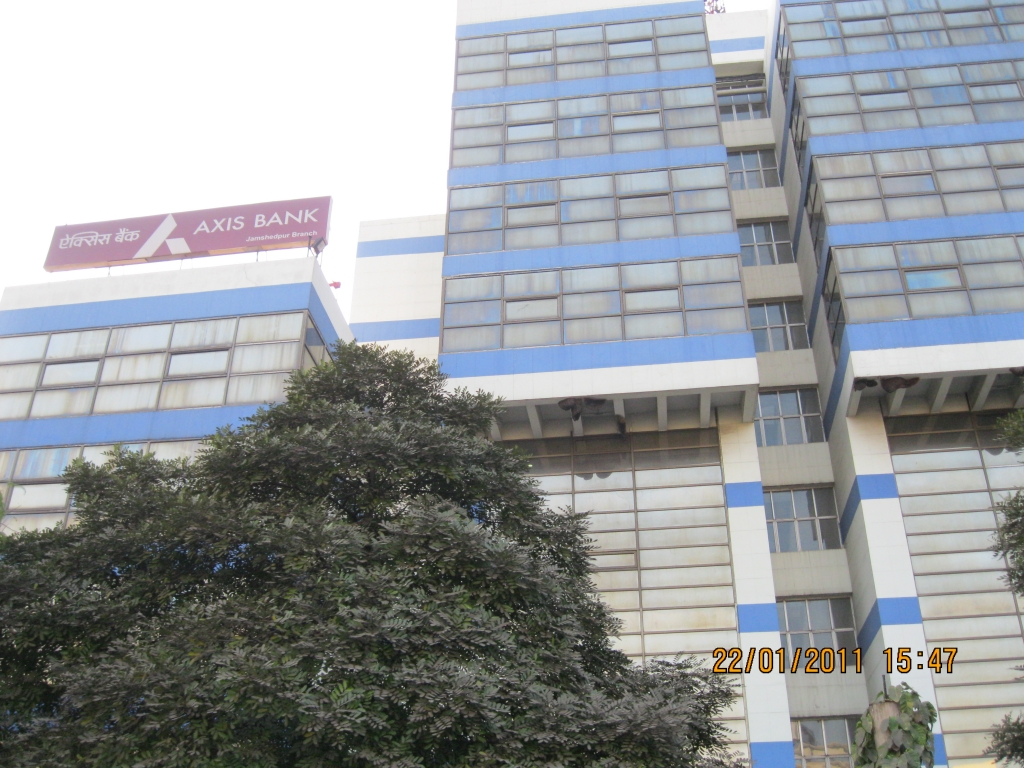
TCS at Voltas House, Jamshedpur

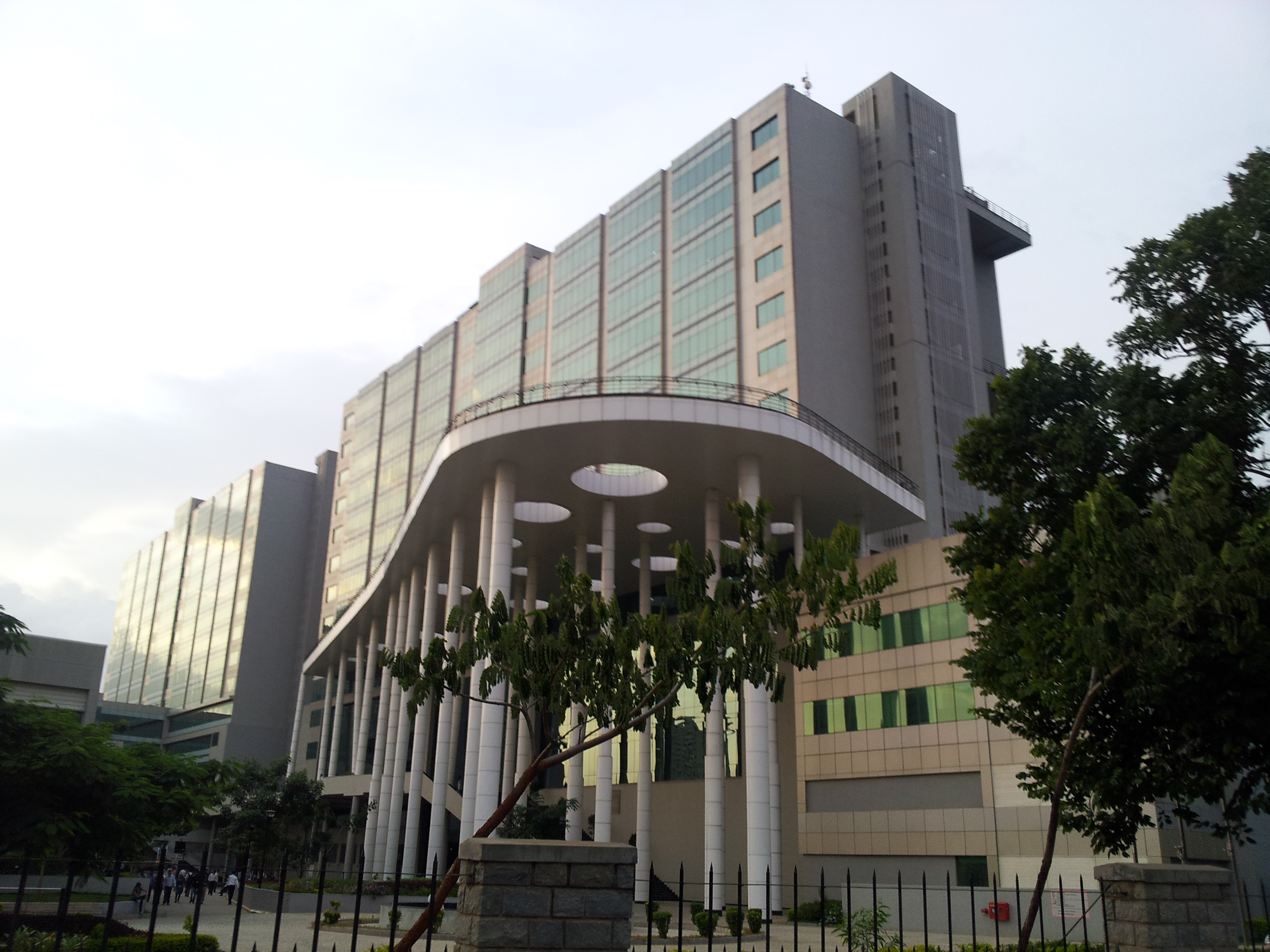
Wipro headquarters at Sarjapura Road, Electronic City, Bengaluru

This is a list of notable companies in the information technology sector based in India. Top Indian companies are listed in descending order of their market capitalization, and other companies are listed alphabetically, grouped by the cities in which they are headquartered. Certain companies have main offices in more than one city, in which case they are listed under each, but minor offices and resources are not listed. Foreign companies that have a large presence in India are also included. There are IT companies of Indian origin headquartered in the US and other countries. Several foreign companies have more employees in India than in their parent countries.

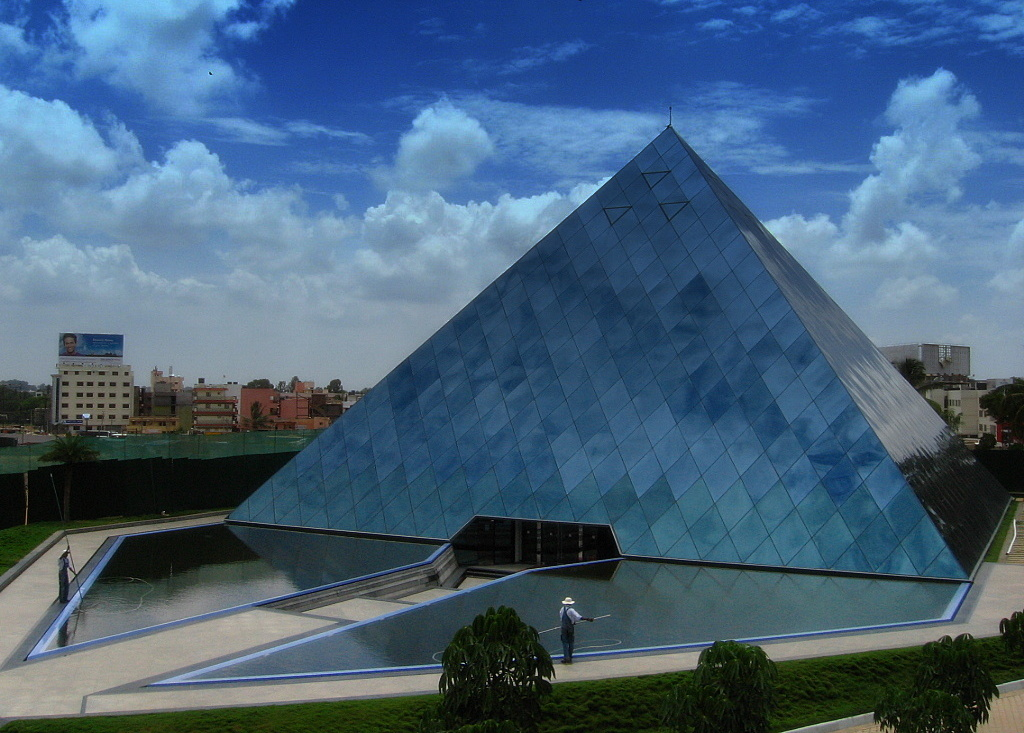
Infosys Media Centre in Electronic City, Bengaluru

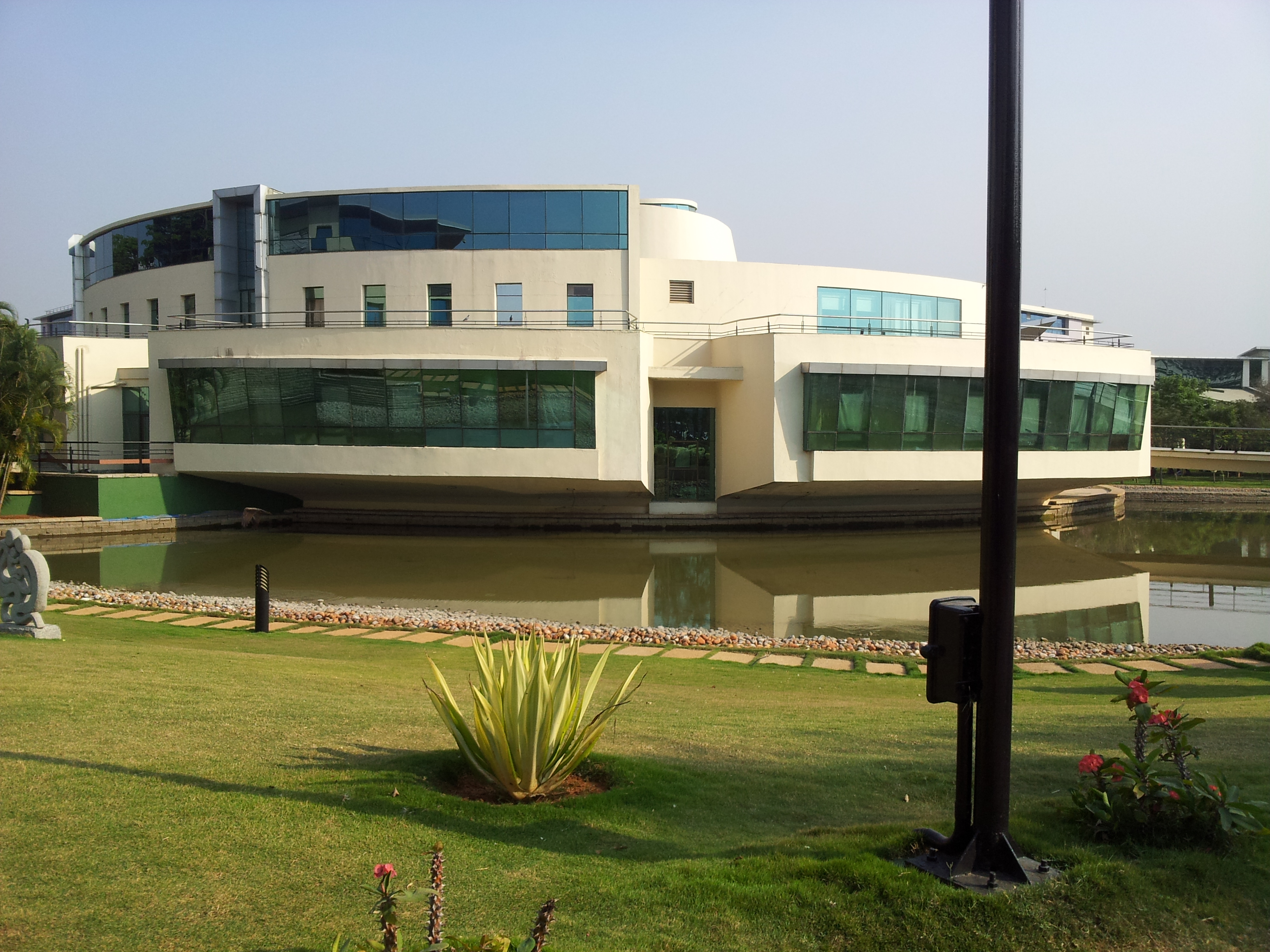
Wipro Floating Learning Centre in Electronic City, Bengaluru

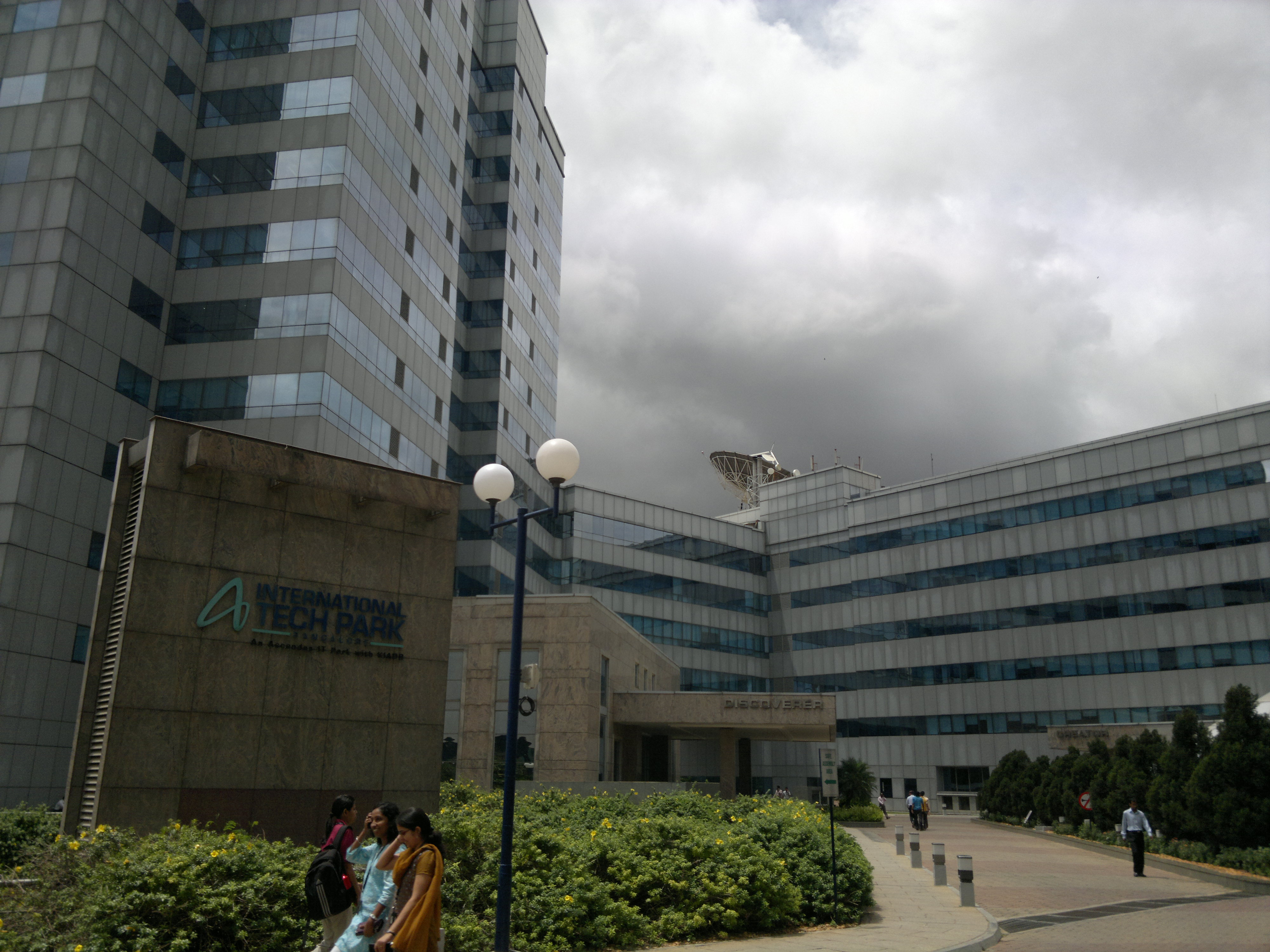
International Tech Park, Bengaluru

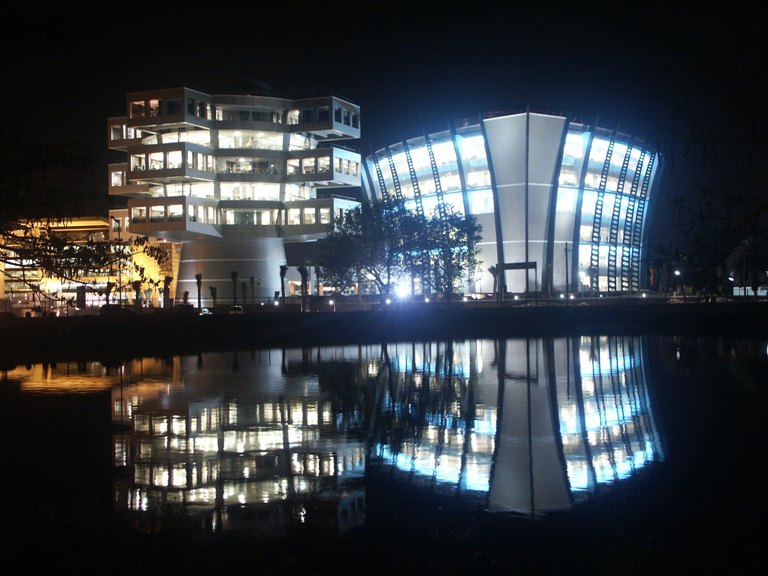
Oracle Financial Services campus at Bagmane Tech Park, Bengaluru

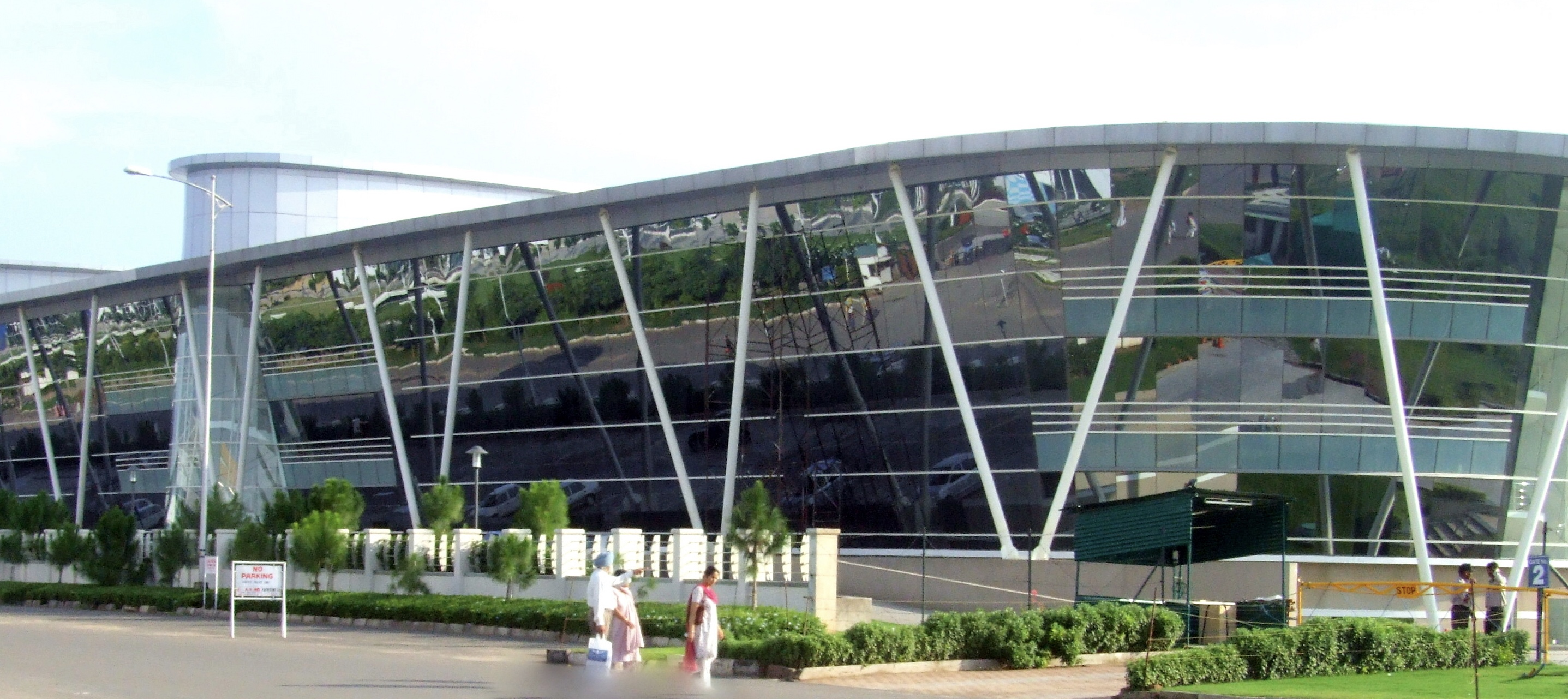
Rajiv Gandhi Chandigarh Technology Park (RGCTP)

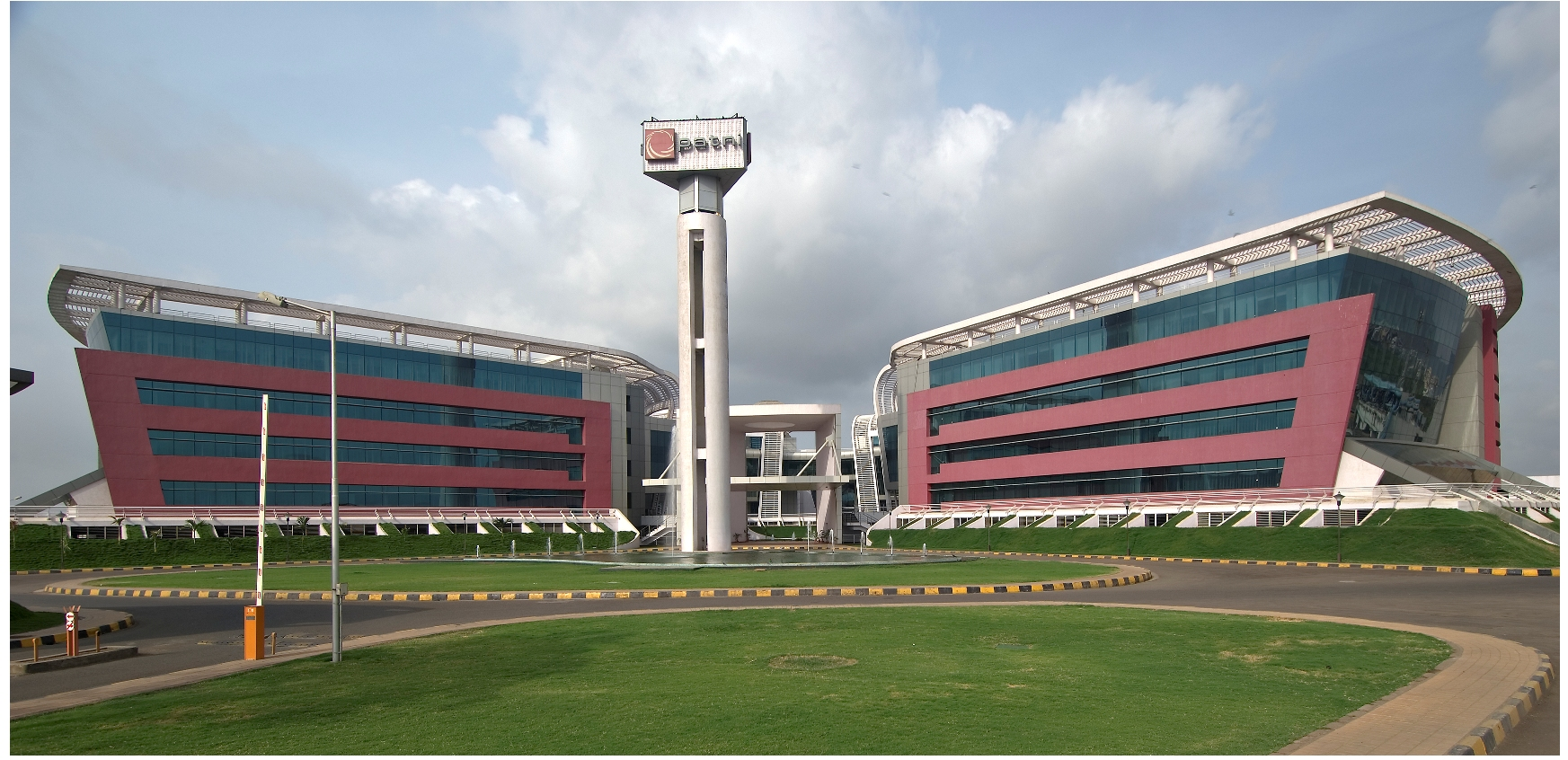
Patni Knowledge Park, Airoli, Navi Mumbai

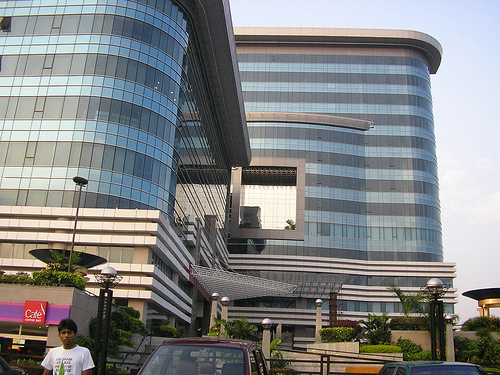
Millenium Tower in Kolkata, Salt Lake Sector-5, a major IT hub in the city

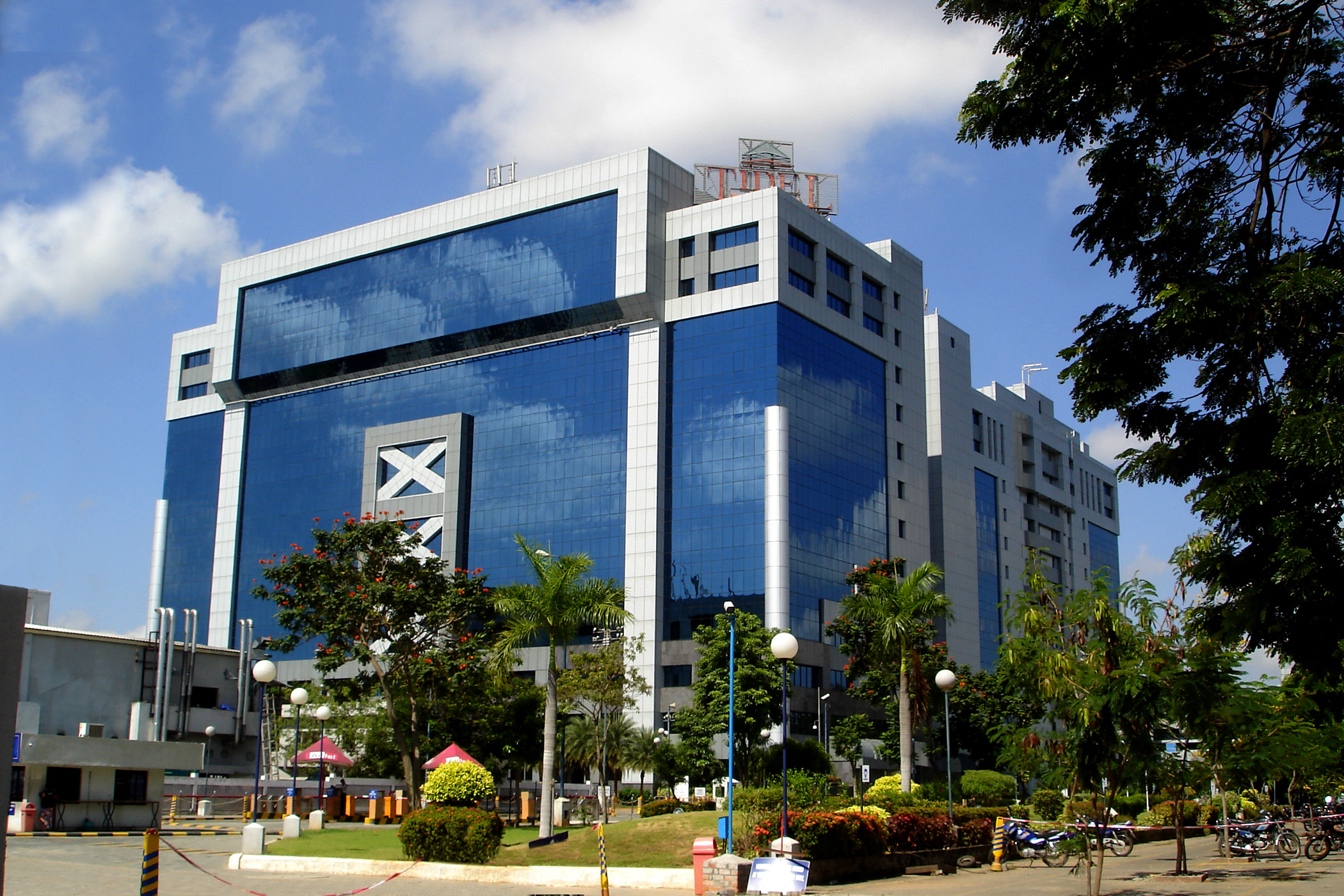
Tidel Park—one of the largest software parks in Asia—was set up on 4 July 2000 in Chennai.

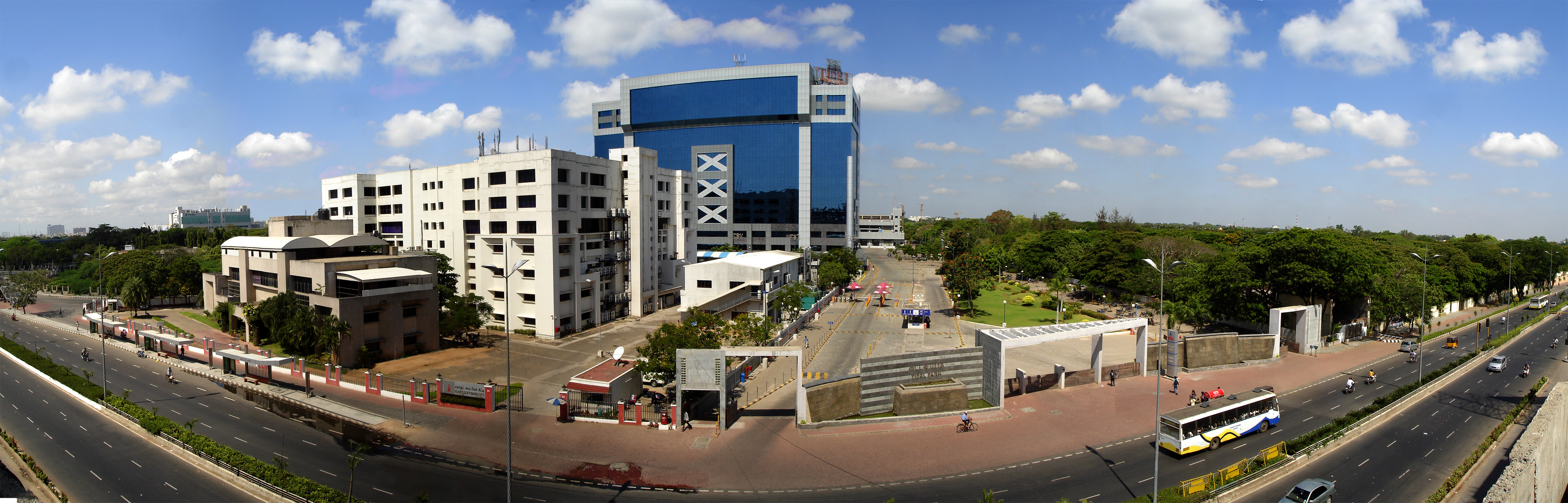
Tidel Park and ELNET on Rajiv Gandhi Salai

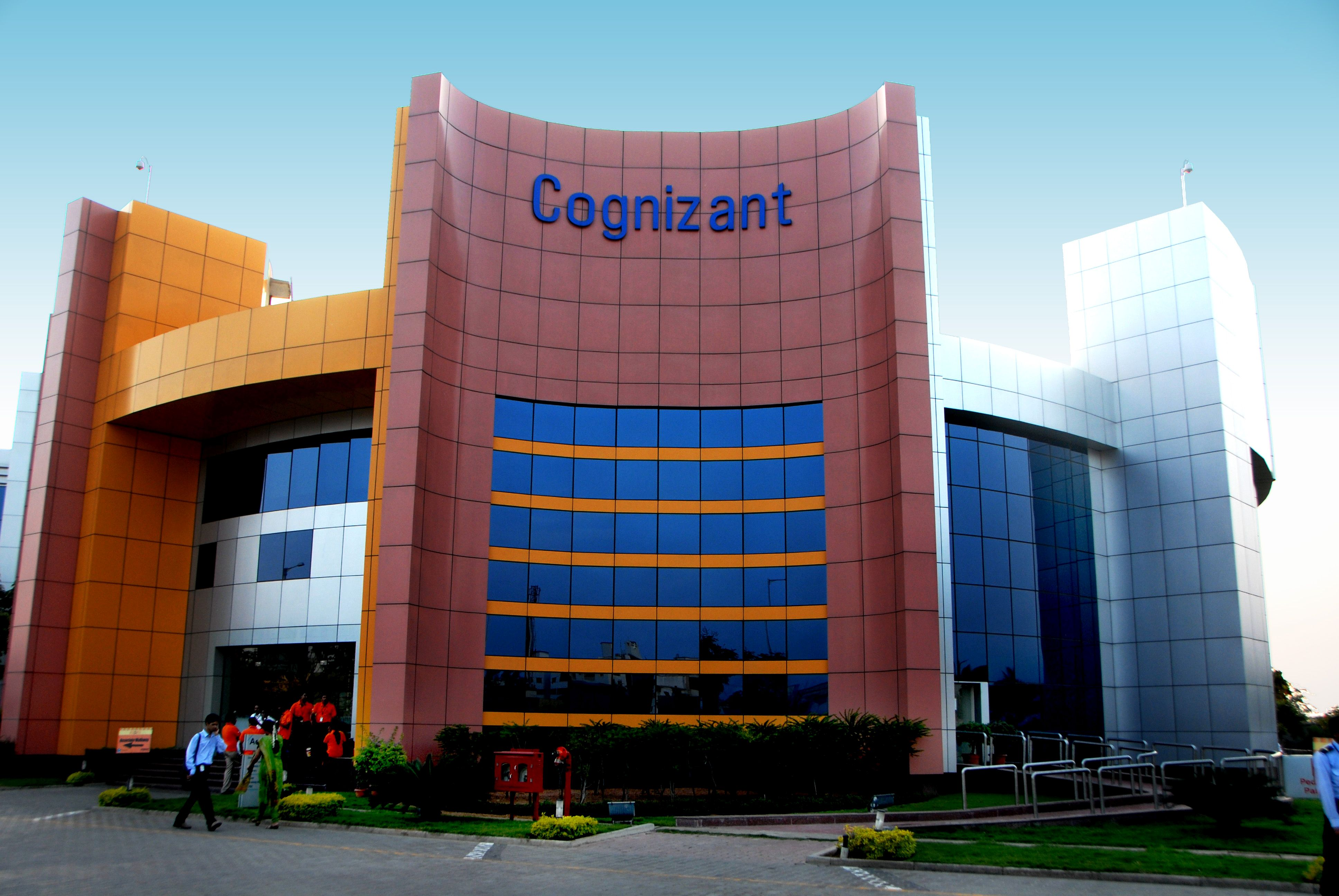
Cognizant's original corporate headquarters in Chennai and later an offshore delivery center, sold to Bagmane Group in 2025

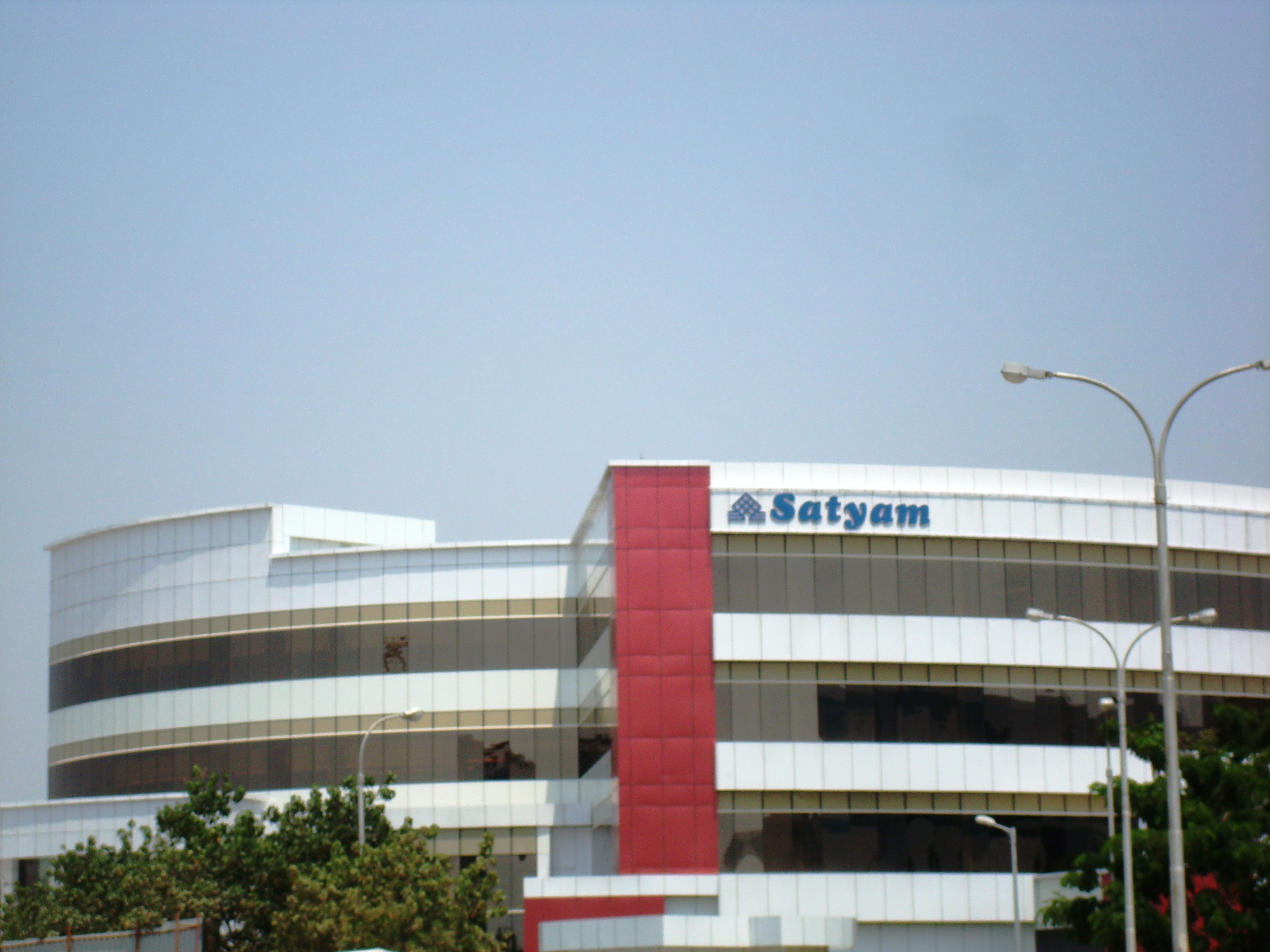
Tech Mahindra Campus, HITEC City, Hyderabad

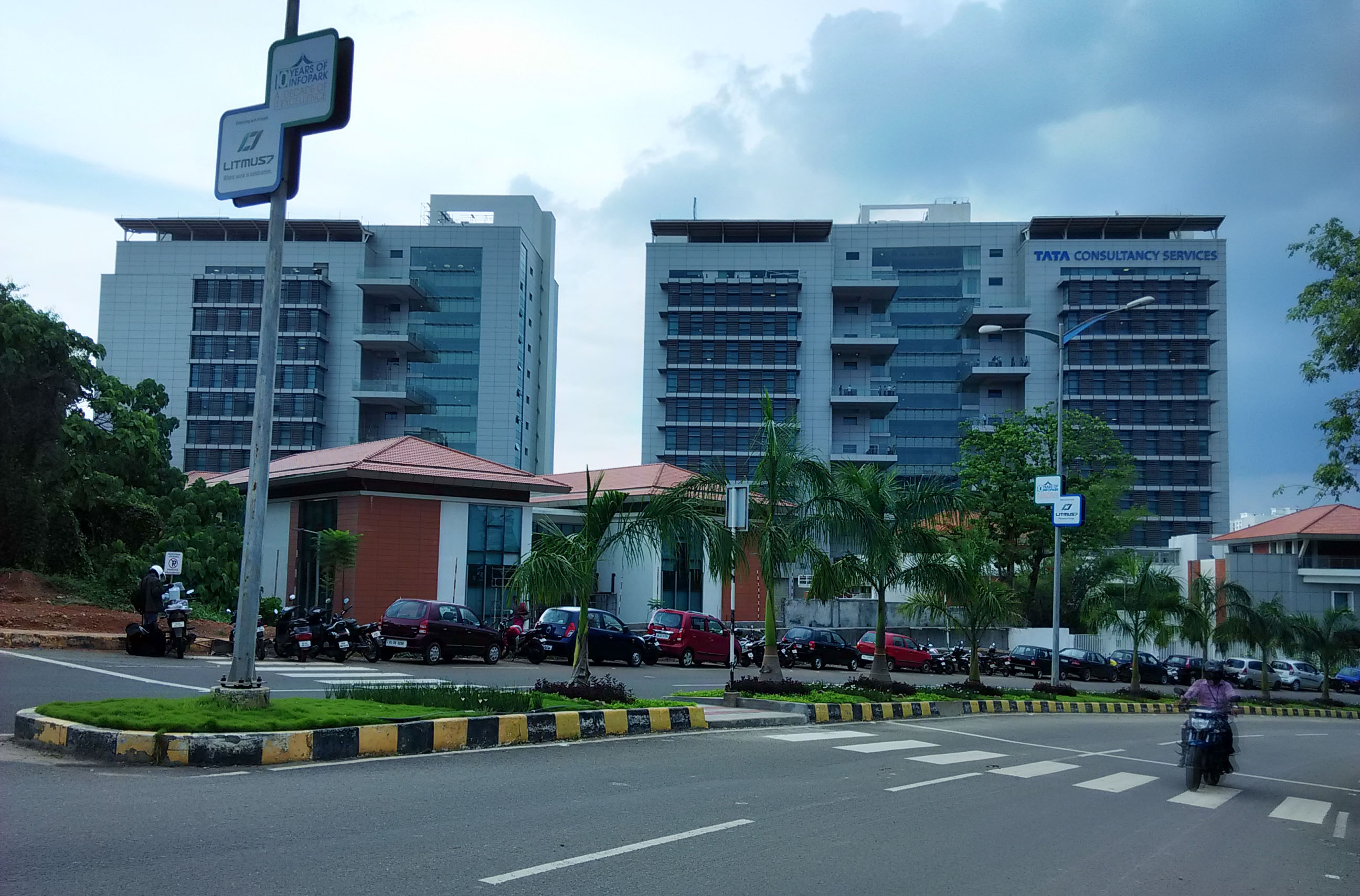
TCS Centre at Infopark, Kochi

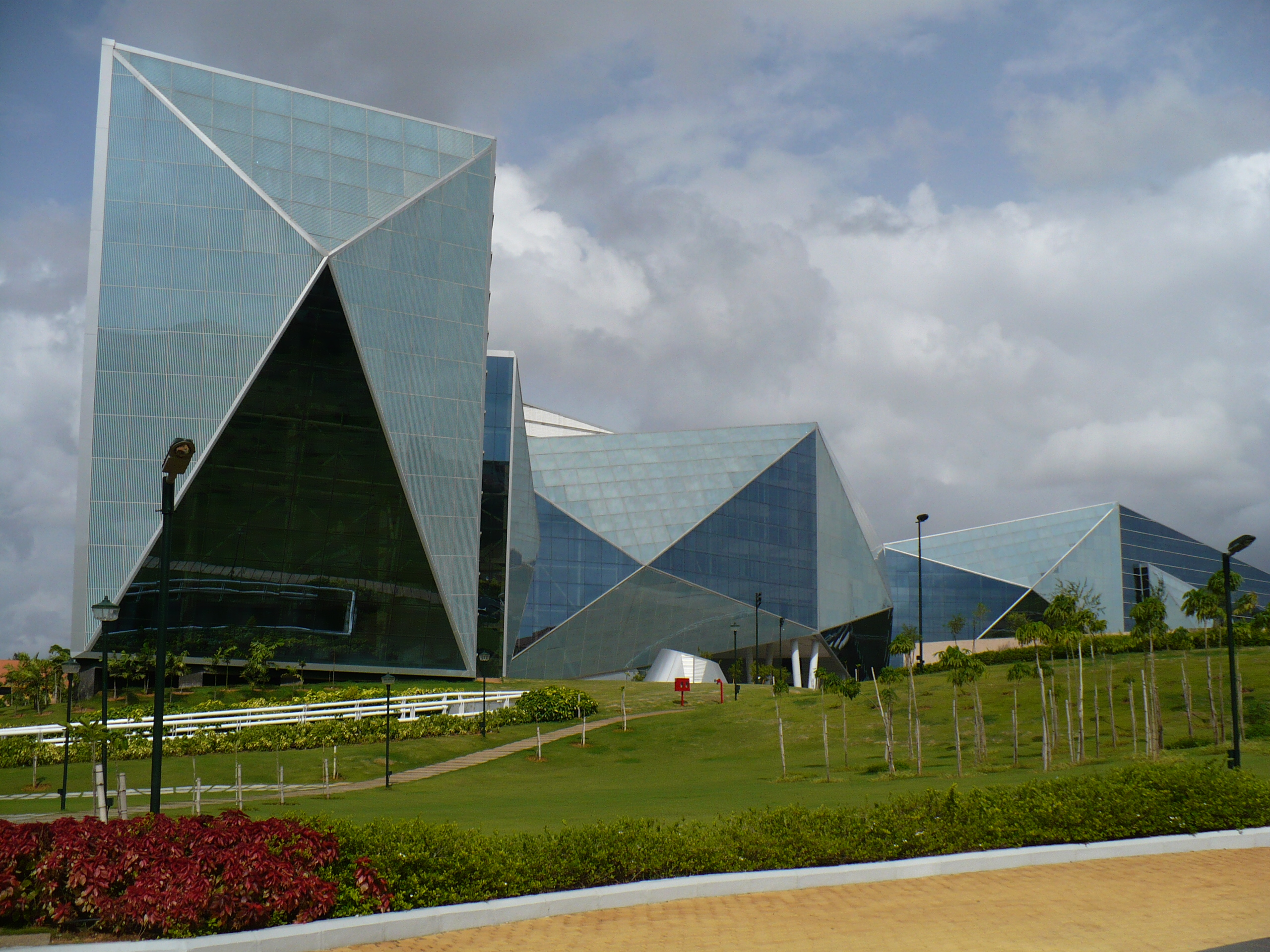
Infosys has the largest corporate university in the world, located on its Mysore campus.

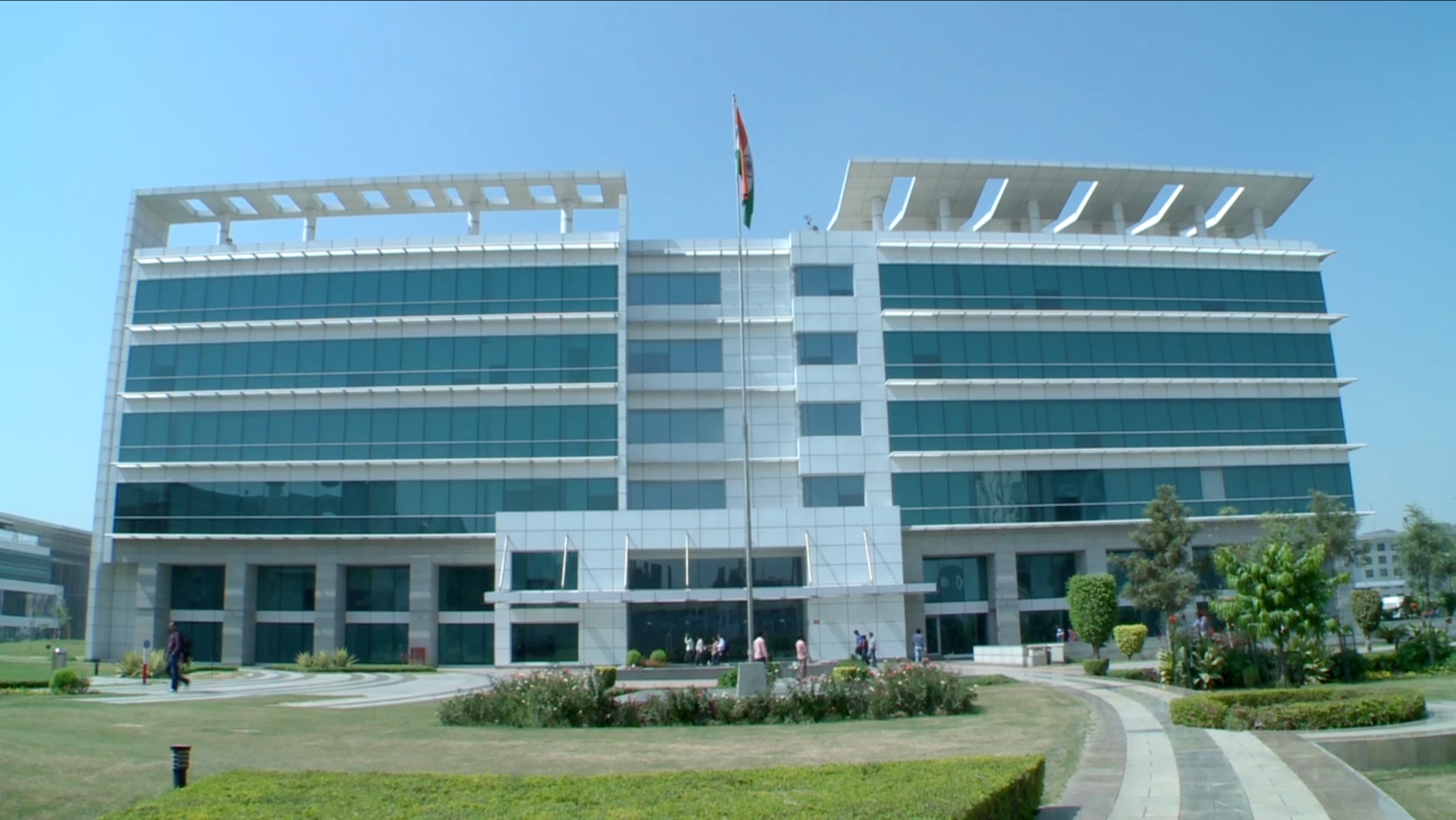
HCL Technologies Noida SEZ campus

Nila, one of the first buildings in Technopark, Trivandrum, the largest IT park in India

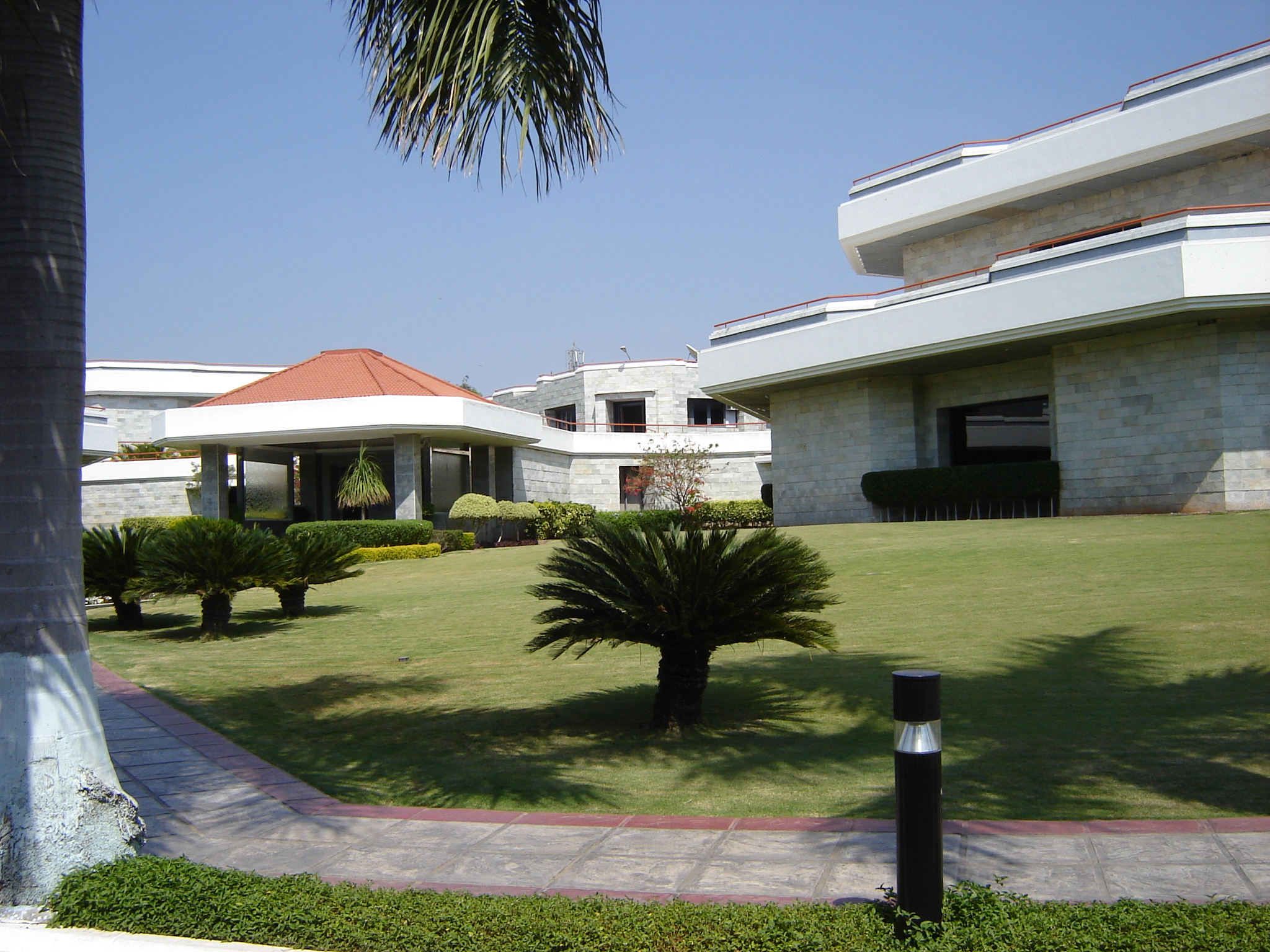
Tech Mahindra Center at Bahadurpally, Hyderabad

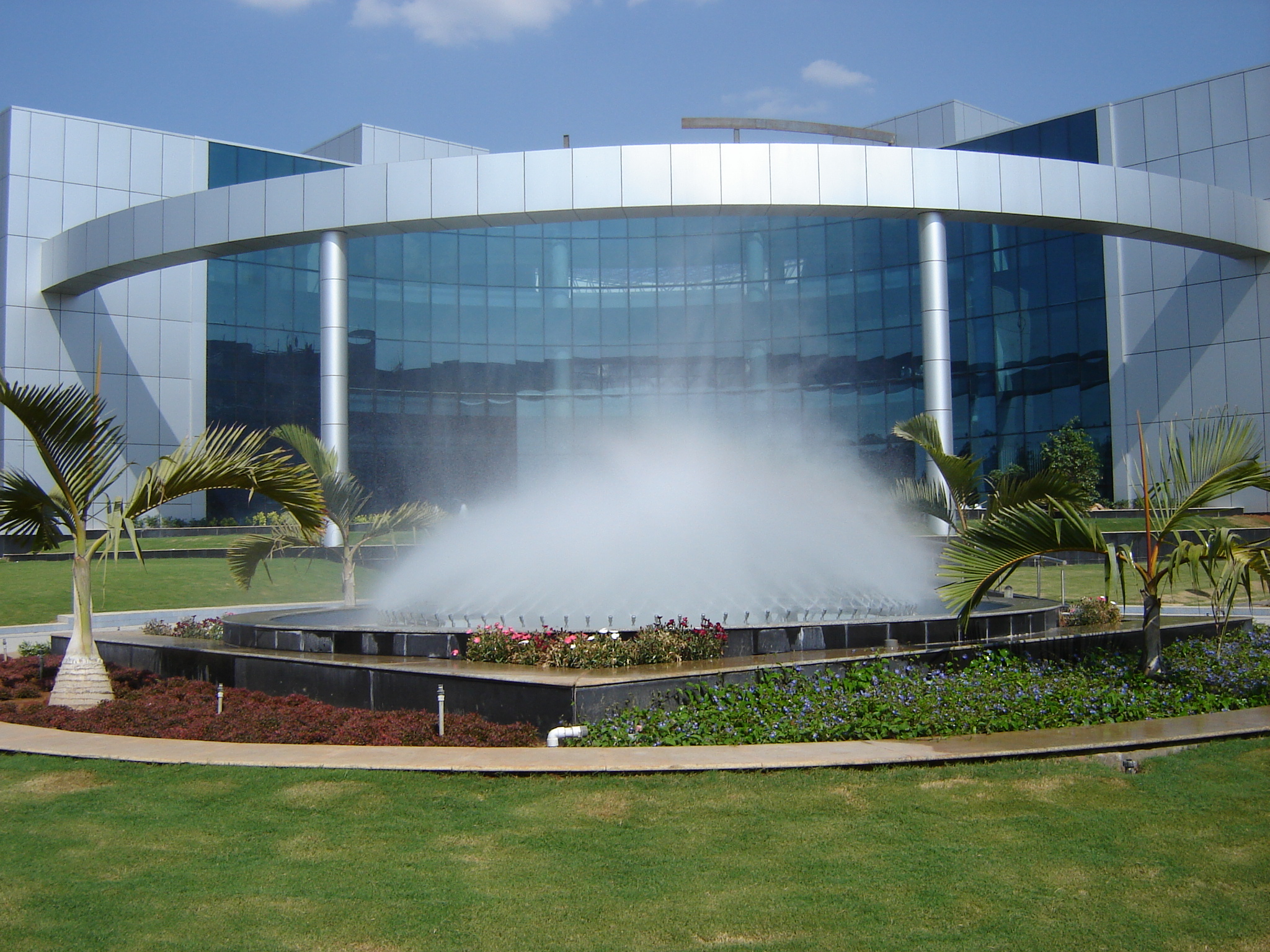
Tech Mahindra Development Center

== Top Indian companies ==
Name	Headquarters	Total income	Headcount	City
Tata Consultancy Services	Mumbai	₹ 2,59,282 cr US$31 B (FY'25)	607,979 (FY'25)	Ahmedabad
Tata Consultancy Services	Mumbai	₹ 2,59,282 cr US$31 B (FY'25)	607,979 (FY'25)	Bengaluru
Tata Consultancy Services	Mumbai	₹ 2,59,282 cr US$31 B (FY'25)	607,979 (FY'25)	Bhubaneswar
Tata Consultancy Services	Mumbai	₹ 2,59,282 cr US$31 B (FY'25)	607,979 (FY'25)	Chennai
Tata Consultancy Services	Mumbai	₹ 2,59,282 cr US$31 B (FY'25)	607,979 (FY'25)	Coimbatore
Tata Consultancy Services	Mumbai	₹ 2,59,282 cr US$31 B (FY'25)	607,979 (FY'25)	Delhi
Tata Consultancy Services	Mumbai	₹ 2,59,282 cr US$31 B (FY'25)	607,979 (FY'25)	Gandhinagar
Tata Consultancy Services	Mumbai	₹ 2,59,282 cr US$31 B (FY'25)	607,979 (FY'25)	Gurgaon
Tata Consultancy Services	Mumbai	₹ 2,59,282 cr US$31 B (FY'25)	607,979 (FY'25)	Guwahati
Tata Consultancy Services	Mumbai	₹ 2,59,282 cr US$31 B (FY'25)	607,979 (FY'25)	Hyderabad
Tata Consultancy Services	Mumbai	₹ 2,59,282 cr US$31 B (FY'25)	607,979 (FY'25)	Indore
Tata Consultancy Services	Mumbai	₹ 2,59,282 cr US$31 B (FY'25)	607,979 (FY'25)	Jamshedpur
Tata Consultancy Services	Mumbai	₹ 2,59,282 cr US$31 B (FY'25)	607,979 (FY'25)	Kochi
Tata Consultancy Services	Mumbai	₹ 2,59,282 cr US$31 B (FY'25)	607,979 (FY'25)	Kolkata
Tata Consultancy Services	Mumbai	₹ 2,59,282 cr US$31 B (FY'25)	607,979 (FY'25)	Lucknow
Tata Consultancy Services	Mumbai	₹ 2,59,282 cr US$31 B (FY'25)	607,979 (FY'25)	Mangalore
Tata Consultancy Services	Mumbai	₹ 2,59,282 cr US$31 B (FY'25)	607,979 (FY'25)	Mumbai
Tata Consultancy Services	Mumbai	₹ 2,59,282 cr US$31 B (FY'25)	607,979 (FY'25)	Nagpur
Tata Consultancy Services	Mumbai	₹ 2,59,282 cr US$31 B (FY'25)	607,979 (FY'25)	Noida
Tata Consultancy Services	Mumbai	₹ 2,59,282 cr US$31 B (FY'25)	607,979 (FY'25)	Patna
Tata Consultancy Services	Mumbai	₹ 2,59,282 cr US$31 B (FY'25)	607,979 (FY'25)	Pune
Tata Consultancy Services	Mumbai	₹ 2,59,282 cr US$31 B (FY'25)	607,979 (FY'25)	Vadodara
Tata Consultancy Services	Mumbai	₹ 2,59,282 cr US$31 B (FY'25)	607,979 (FY'25)	Varanasi
Tata Consultancy Services	Mumbai	₹ 2,59,282 cr US$31 B (FY'25)	607,979 (FY'25)	Thiruvananthapuram
Infosys	Bangalore	₹ 1,66,590 cr US$20 B (FY'25)	317,240 (FY'25)	Bengaluru
Infosys	Bangalore	₹ 1,66,590 cr US$20 B (FY'25)	317,240 (FY'25)	Bhubaneswar
Infosys	Bangalore	₹ 1,66,590 cr US$20 B (FY'25)	317,240 (FY'25)	Chandigarh
Infosys	Bangalore	₹ 1,66,590 cr US$20 B (FY'25)	317,240 (FY'25)	Chennai
Infosys	Bangalore	₹ 1,66,590 cr US$20 B (FY'25)	317,240 (FY'25)	Delhi
Infosys	Bangalore	₹ 1,66,590 cr US$20 B (FY'25)	317,240 (FY'25)	Hyderabad
Infosys	Bangalore	₹ 1,66,590 cr US$20 B (FY'25)	317,240 (FY'25)	Indore
Infosys	Bangalore	₹ 1,66,590 cr US$20 B (FY'25)	317,240 (FY'25)	Jaipur
Infosys	Bangalore	₹ 1,66,590 cr US$20 B (FY'25)	317,240 (FY'25)	Kolkata
Infosys	Bangalore	₹ 1,66,590 cr US$20 B (FY'25)	317,240 (FY'25)	Mangalore
Infosys	Bangalore	₹ 1,66,590 cr US$20 B (FY'25)	317,240 (FY'25)	Mysore
Infosys	Bangalore	₹ 1,66,590 cr US$20 B (FY'25)	317,240 (FY'25)	Nagpur
Infosys	Bangalore	₹ 1,66,590 cr US$20 B (FY'25)	317,240 (FY'25)	Pune
Infosys	Bangalore	₹ 1,66,590 cr US$20 B (FY'25)	317,240 (FY'25)	Thiruvananthapuram
Wipro	Bangalore	₹ 92,972 cr US$11 B (FY'25)	234,054 (FY'24)	Ahmedabad
Wipro	Bangalore	₹ 92,972 cr US$11 B (FY'25)	234,054 (FY'24)	Bengaluru
Wipro	Bangalore	₹ 92,972 cr US$11 B (FY'25)	234,054 (FY'24)	Bhubaneswar
Wipro	Bangalore	₹ 92,972 cr US$11 B (FY'25)	234,054 (FY'24)	Chennai
Wipro	Bangalore	₹ 92,972 cr US$11 B (FY'25)	234,054 (FY'24)	Coimbatore
Wipro	Bangalore	₹ 92,972 cr US$11 B (FY'25)	234,054 (FY'24)	Gurgaon
Wipro	Bangalore	₹ 92,972 cr US$11 B (FY'25)	234,054 (FY'24)	Guwahati
Wipro	Bangalore	₹ 92,972 cr US$11 B (FY'25)	234,054 (FY'24)	Hyderabad
Wipro	Bangalore	₹ 92,972 cr US$11 B (FY'25)	234,054 (FY'24)	Jaipur
Wipro	Bangalore	₹ 92,972 cr US$11 B (FY'25)	234,054 (FY'24)	Kochi
Wipro	Bangalore	₹ 92,972 cr US$11 B (FY'25)	234,054 (FY'24)	Kolkata
Wipro	Bangalore	₹ 92,972 cr US$11 B (FY'25)	234,054 (FY'24)	Mumbai
Wipro	Bangalore	₹ 92,972 cr US$11 B (FY'25)	234,054 (FY'24)	Mysore
Wipro	Bangalore	₹ 92,972 cr US$11 B (FY'25)	234,054 (FY'24)	Noida
Wipro	Bangalore	₹ 92,972 cr US$11 B (FY'25)	234,054 (FY'24)	Pune
Wipro	Bangalore	₹ 92,972 cr US$11 B (FY'25)	234,054 (FY'24)	Vadodara
Wipro	Bangalore	₹ 92,972 cr US$11 B (FY'25)	234,054 (FY'24)	Visakhapatnam
HCL Tech	Noida	₹ 1,19,540 cr US$14 B (FY'25)	227,481 (FY'24)	Bengaluru
HCL Tech	Noida	₹ 1,19,540 cr US$14 B (FY'25)	227,481 (FY'24)	Chennai
HCL Tech	Noida	₹ 1,19,540 cr US$14 B (FY'25)	227,481 (FY'24)	Gurgaon
HCL Tech	Noida	₹ 1,19,540 cr US$14 B (FY'25)	227,481 (FY'24)	Hyderabad
HCL Tech	Noida	₹ 1,19,540 cr US$14 B (FY'25)	227,481 (FY'24)	Kochi
HCL Tech	Noida	₹ 1,19,540 cr US$14 B (FY'25)	227,481 (FY'24)	Kolkata
HCL Tech	Noida	₹ 1,19,540 cr US$14 B (FY'25)	227,481 (FY'24)	Lucknow
HCL Tech	Noida	₹ 1,19,540 cr US$14 B (FY'25)	227,481 (FY'24)	Mumbai
HCL Tech	Noida	₹ 1,19,540 cr US$14 B (FY'25)	227,481 (FY'24)	Nagpur
HCL Tech	Noida	₹ 1,19,540 cr US$14 B (FY'25)	227,481 (FY'24)	Noida
HCL Tech	Noida	₹ 1,19,540 cr US$14 B (FY'25)	227,481 (FY'24)	Pune
HCL Tech	Noida	₹ 1,19,540 cr US$14 B (FY'25)	227,481 (FY'24)	Vadodara
HCL Tech	Noida	₹ 1,19,540 cr US$14 B (FY'25)	227,481 (FY'24)	Vijayawada
Tech Mahindra	Pune	₹ 53,847 cr US$6.4 B (FY'25)	148,731 (FY'25)	Bengaluru
Tech Mahindra	Pune	₹ 53,847 cr US$6.4 B (FY'25)	148,731 (FY'25)	Bhubaneswar
Tech Mahindra	Pune	₹ 53,847 cr US$6.4 B (FY'25)	148,731 (FY'25)	Chandigarh
Tech Mahindra	Pune	₹ 53,847 cr US$6.4 B (FY'25)	148,731 (FY'25)	Chennai
Tech Mahindra	Pune	₹ 53,847 cr US$6.4 B (FY'25)	148,731 (FY'25)	Hyderabad
Tech Mahindra	Pune	₹ 53,847 cr US$6.4 B (FY'25)	148,731 (FY'25)	Kochi
Tech Mahindra	Pune	₹ 53,847 cr US$6.4 B (FY'25)	148,731 (FY'25)	Kolkata
Tech Mahindra	Pune	₹ 53,847 cr US$6.4 B (FY'25)	148,731 (FY'25)	Mumbai
Tech Mahindra	Pune	₹ 53,847 cr US$6.4 B (FY'25)	148,731 (FY'25)	Nagpur
Tech Mahindra	Pune	₹ 53,847 cr US$6.4 B (FY'25)	148,731 (FY'25)	Noida
Tech Mahindra	Pune	₹ 53,847 cr US$6.4 B (FY'25)	148,731 (FY'25)	Pune
Tech Mahindra	Pune	₹ 53,847 cr US$6.4 B (FY'25)	148,731 (FY'25)	Vijayawada
L&T Technology Services	Vadodara	₹ 9,647 cr US$1.1 B (FY'24)	23,812 (FY'24)	
Oracle Financial Services Software	Mumbai	₹ 6,373 cr US $750 M (FY'24)	8,754 (FY'24)	Bengaluru
Oracle Financial Services Software	Mumbai	₹ 6,373 cr US $750 M (FY'24)	8,754 (FY'24)	Chennai
Oracle Financial Services Software	Mumbai	₹ 6,373 cr US $750 M (FY'24)	8,754 (FY'24)	Hyderabad
Oracle Financial Services Software	Mumbai	₹ 6,373 cr US $750 M (FY'24)	8,754 (FY'24)	Mumbai
Oracle Financial Services Software	Mumbai	₹ 6,373 cr US $750 M (FY'24)	8,754 (FY'24)	Pune
LTM	Mumbai	₹ 38,997 cr US$4.6 B (FY'25)	81,650 (FY'24)	Bengaluru
LTM	Mumbai	₹ 38,997 cr US$4.6 B (FY'25)	81,650 (FY'24)	Bhubaneswar
LTM	Mumbai	₹ 38,997 cr US$4.6 B (FY'25)	81,650 (FY'24)	Chennai
LTM	Mumbai	₹ 38,997 cr US$4.6 B (FY'25)	81,650 (FY'24)	Mumbai
LTM	Mumbai	₹ 38,997 cr US$4.6 B (FY'25)	81,650 (FY'24)	Pune
LTM	Mumbai	₹ 38,997 cr US$4.6 B (FY'25)	81,650 (FY'24)	Hyderabad
LTM	Mumbai	₹ 38,997 cr US$4.6 B (FY'25)	81,650 (FY'24)	Indore
LTM	Mumbai	₹ 38,997 cr US$4.6 B (FY'25)	81,650 (FY'24)	Noida
LTM	Mumbai	₹ 38,997 cr US$4.6 B (FY'25)	81,650 (FY'24)	Nagpur
LTM	Mumbai	₹ 38,997 cr US$4.6 B (FY'25)	81,650 (FY'24)	Navi Mumbai
LTM	Mumbai	₹ 38,997 cr US$4.6 B (FY'25)	81,650 (FY'24)	Kolkata
LTM	Mumbai	₹ 38,997 cr US$4.6 B (FY'25)	81,650 (FY'24)	Warangal
Mphasis	Bangalore	₹ 14,484 cr US$1.7 B (FY'25)	33,771 (FY'23)	Bengaluru
Mphasis	Bangalore	₹ 14,484 cr US$1.7 B (FY'25)	33,771 (FY'23)	Bhubaneswar
Mphasis	Bangalore	₹ 14,484 cr US$1.7 B (FY'25)	33,771 (FY'23)	Chennai
Mphasis	Bangalore	₹ 14,484 cr US$1.7 B (FY'25)	33,771 (FY'23)	Mangalore
Mphasis	Bangalore	₹ 14,484 cr US$1.7 B (FY'25)	33,771 (FY'23)	Mumbai
Mphasis	Bangalore	₹ 14,484 cr US$1.7 B (FY'25)	33,771 (FY'23)	Pune

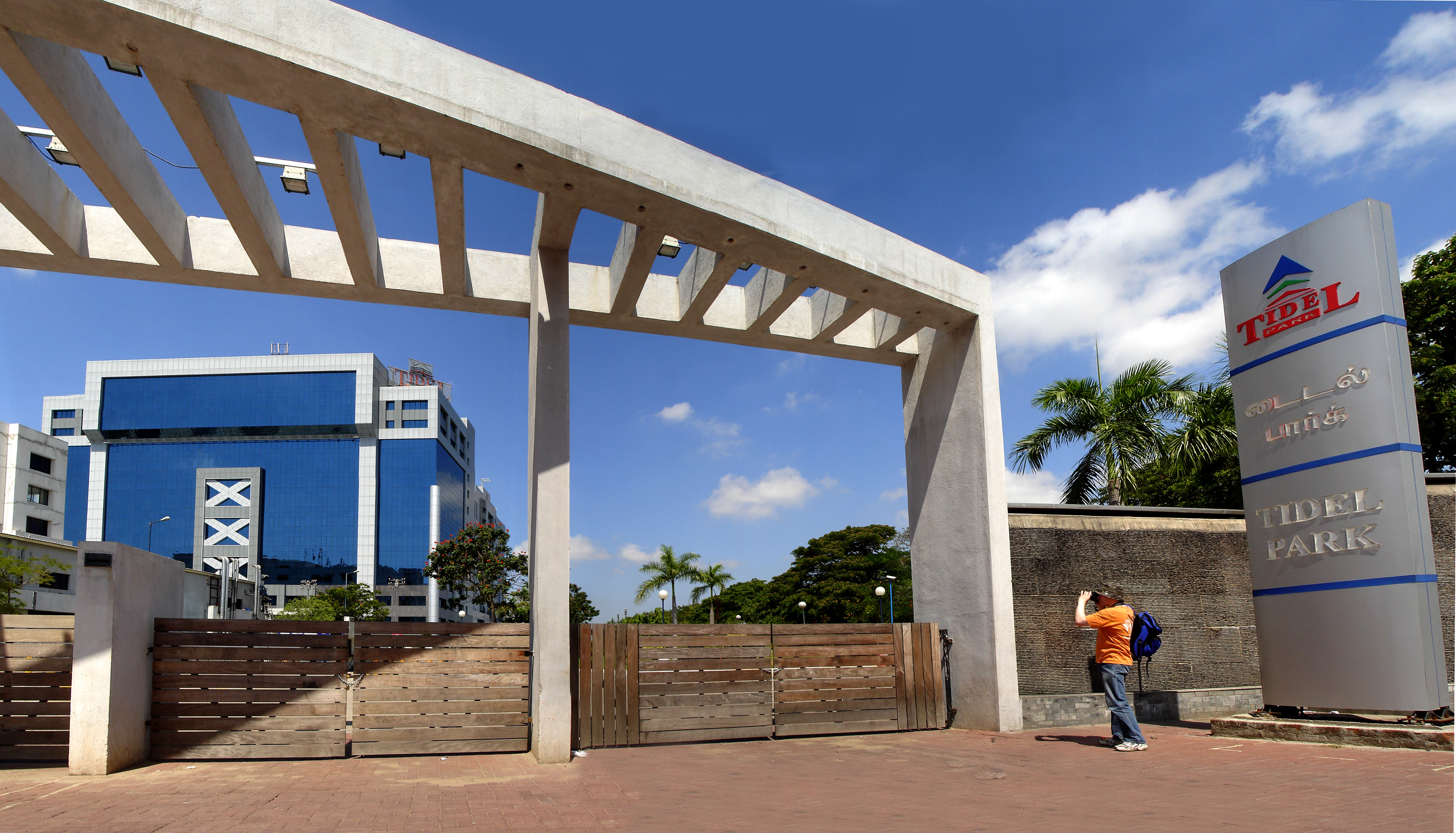
Entrance of the TIDEL Park

== Other companies ==
Name	Headquarters	City
3i Infotech	Mumbai	Bengaluru
3i Infotech	Mumbai	Hyderabad
3i Infotech	Mumbai	Mumbai
3i Infotech	Mumbai	Noida
NTT Data Payment Services	Mumbai	Mumbai
C-DAC	Pune	Kolkata
C-DAC	Pune	Pune
C-DAC	Pune	Thiruvananthapuram
Coforge	Noida India, New Jersey USA	New Delhi
Coforge	Noida India, New Jersey USA	Greater Noida
Coforge	Noida India, New Jersey USA	Kolkata
Coforge	Noida India, New Jersey USA	Gurgaon
Coforge	Noida India, New Jersey USA	Mumbai
Coforge	Noida India, New Jersey USA	Hyderabad
Coforge	Noida India, New Jersey USA	Telangana
Coforge	Noida India, New Jersey USA	Karnataka
Coforge	Noida India, New Jersey USA	Bengaluru
Coforge	Noida India, New Jersey USA	Pune
Coforge	Noida India, New Jersey USA	Kolhapur
Cognizant	Teaneck, New Jersey	Bengaluru
Cognizant	Teaneck, New Jersey	Chennai
Cognizant	Teaneck, New Jersey	Coimbatore
Cognizant	Teaneck, New Jersey	Gurgaon
Cognizant	Teaneck, New Jersey	Hyderabad
Cognizant	Teaneck, New Jersey	Kochi
Cognizant	Teaneck, New Jersey	Kolkata
Cognizant	Teaneck, New Jersey	Mangalore
Cognizant	Teaneck, New Jersey	Mumbai
Cognizant	Teaneck, New Jersey	Pune
Collabera	Morristown, New Jersey, United States	Bengaluru
Collabera	Morristown, New Jersey, United States	Gurgaon
Collabera	Morristown, New Jersey, United States	Hyderabad
Collabera	Morristown, New Jersey, United States	Mumbai
Collabera	Morristown, New Jersey, United States	Kolkata
Collabera	Morristown, New Jersey, United States	Pune
DXC Technology	Ashburn, Virginia	Chennai
Cyient	Hyderabad	Bengaluru
Cyient	Hyderabad	Hyderabad
Firstsource	Mumbai	Bhubaneswar
Firstsource	Mumbai	Kolkata
Godrej Infotech	Mumbai	Mumbai
Honeywell	Morris Plains, New Jersey	Madurai
HSBC Technology India	Pune	Pune
KPIT Technologies	Pune	Pune
KPIT Technologies	Pune	Chennai
KPIT Technologies	Pune	Bengaluru
KPIT Technologies	Pune	Kochi
KPIT Technologies	Pune	Mumbai
KPIT Technologies	Pune	Noida
Lumen Technologies	Bengaluru	Bengaluru
Lumen Technologies	Bengaluru	Chennai
Lumen Technologies	Bengaluru	Hyderabad
Lumen Technologies	Bengaluru	Noida
Microland	Bangalore	Bengaluru
Microsoft	Hyderabad	Ahmedabad
Microsoft	Hyderabad	Bangalore
Microsoft	Hyderabad	Chennai
Microsoft	Hyderabad	Gurgaon
Microsoft	Hyderabad	Hyderabad
Microsoft	Hyderabad	Kochi
Microsoft	Hyderabad	Kolkata
Microsoft	Hyderabad	Mumbai
Microsoft	Hyderabad	New Delhi
Nucleus Software Exports	Noida	Noida
Persistent Systems	Pune	Bengaluru
Persistent Systems	Pune	Goa
Persistent Systems	Pune	Hyderabad
Persistent Systems	Pune	Nagpur
Persistent Systems	Pune	Pune
Ramco Systems	Chennai	Chennai
Ramco Systems	Chennai	Mumbai
Rediff.com	Mumbai	Mumbai
Samsung India Software Centre	Noida	Noida
Sasken Technologies	Bangalore	Bengaluru
Sasken Technologies	Bangalore	Chennai
Sasken Technologies	Bangalore	Pune
Sonata Software	Bangalore	Bengaluru
Sonata Software	Bangalore	Mumbai
Tata Interactive Systems	Mumbai	Mumbai
Tata Interactive Systems	Chennai	
Tata Interactive Systems	Kochi	
Tata Interactive Systems	Thiruvananthapuram	
Tata Interactive Systems	Hyderabad	
Tata Interactive Systems	Pune	
WNS Global Services	Mumbai	Mumbai
WNS Global Services	Mumbai	Nashik
Zensar Technologies	Pune	Hyderabad
Zensar Technologies	Pune	Bengaluru
Zensar Technologies	Pune	Mumbai
Zensar Technologies	Pune	Pune
Tally Solutions	Bangalore	Bangalore
Zoho Corporation	Chennai	Chennai
Kellton Tech Solutions Limited	Hyderabad	Gurgaon
Kellton Tech Solutions Limited	Hyderabad	Lucknow

== Largest Indian IT companies based on market capitalisation ==
Top IT services companies in India in 2025 by market capitalization. In September 2021, TCS recorded a market capitalisation of US$ 200 billion, making it the first Indian IT tech company to do so. On 24 August 2021, Infosys became the fourth Indian company to reach $100 billion in market capitalization.

Rank	IT services company	Market capitalization in 2025
1	Tata Consultancy Services	₹12.41 lakh crore (US$130 billion)
2	Infosys	₹6.19 lakh crore (US$64 billion)
3	Wipro	₹2.52 lakh crore (US$26 billion)
4	HCL Technologies	₹4.22 lakh crore (US$44 billion)
5	LTM	₹1.35 lakh crore (US$14 billion)
6	Tech Mahindra	₹1.46 lakh crore (US$15 billion)

== Largest Indian IT companies in India based on revenue ==
Top IT services companies in India in 2022 by revenue.

Rank	IT services company	Revenue in 2022(US$ billion)	Revenue in 2022(₹ Cr)
1	Tata Consultancy Services	27.5	195,772
2	Infosys	18.2	123,936
3	HCL Technologies	12.3	85,651
4	Wipro	11.2	79,093
5	Tech Mahindra	6.5	38,642
6	LTM	4.1	33,000

== See also ==
- List of IT consulting firms
