= R. Chandrasekhar =

R Chandrashekhar

President of NASSCOM
- In office 2014–2018
- Preceded by: Som Mittal
- Succeeded by: Debjani Ghosh

Personal details
- Born: Andhra Pradesh, India
- Occupation: President of NASSCOM, Former Telecom Secretary

Rentala Chandrashekhar was the former president of NASSCOM and former Secretary to the Indian Department of Information Technology, as well as former Secretary, Department of Telecommunications. He is also a member of the government's technology advisory group, TAGUP. Chandrashekhar is an Indian Administrative Services officer. He has had a distinguished career in the Department of Information Technology, where he initiated the National e-Governance Programme. Chandrashekhar first initiated the three pillars of "e-Governance", namely: Common Service Centre Programme; the State Data Centre Programme; and the State Wide Area Network Programme of India.

He is also a former Telecom Secretary of India, a position putting him in charge of the 2G spectrum auction in 2012. The auction had gained widespread attention after the Supreme Court quashed 2G licenses issued in 2008 and called for a fresh auction of the affected licenses.
