= NSDG =

National e-Governance Services Delivery Gateway

Agency overview
- Formed: 2008
- Parent department: Department of Information Technology
- Website: http://www.nsdg.gov.in/

NSDG (National e-Governance Services Delivery Gateway) is one of India's Mission Mode Projects (MMP). The initiative taken by the Department of Information Technology (DIT), Ministry of Communications & IT. CDAC Mumbai has been entrusted with building of NSDG and NSD (National Services Directory).

NSDG (National e-Governance Services Delivery Gateway) is a standard based messaging middleware for e-Governance services. This is classified under Integrated MMP (Mission Mode Projects) of Department of Information Technology, Govt. of India under NeGP(The National e-Governance Plan) and is the Second Mission Mode Project to enter operational phase starting from 14 August 2008. Apart from many path breaking innovations that NSDG has undertaken itself and the ambitious objective it has embarked upon, NSDG is probably the only one which has won its first appreciation three months before its golive. NSDG won The World is Open Award 2008 in the e-Governance category at The World is Open Award 2008 function organized by Skoch Consultancy Services and Red Hat. The solution is already ready and the Go-Live date is 14/08/08. The National e-Governance Plan (NeGP) of the Govt. of India aims to cooperate, collaborate and integrate information across different departments in the Centre, States and Local Government. Government systems are characterized by islands of legacy systems using heterogeneous platforms and technologies and spread across diverse geographical locations, in varying state of automation, make this task very challenging.

NSDG can simplify the above task by acting as a standards-based messaging switch and providing seamless interoperability and exchange of data across the departments. NSDG acting as a nerve centre, would handle large number of transactions and would help in tracking and time stamping all transactions of the Government.

== Other benefits ==
- Enable transaction logging and time stamping for tracking of transactions and centralized control
- Departments which do not have the complete automation or work flow at the back can still deliver e-Service to the citizens in a limited manner through the Gateway
- Help protect the legacy investments in software and hardware by easily integrating them with other technology platforms and software implementations
- Can act as the Shared services hub by supporting value added service interfaces like the Payment gateway and Authentication interface

== Organizations involved ==
Apart from the Department of IT, Government of India which is the owner of the project, other parties involved are:

- CDAC (Centre for Development of Advanced Computing), Mumbai
- STQC (Standardisation Testing and Quality Certification)
- NIC (National Informatics Centre)
- National Institute for Smart Government

CDAC has shouldered responsibility of designing and implementing NSDG. CDAC will be coordinating Operations and Maintenance for a period of 5 years starting from date of go-live. STQC is the Testing and Certifying authority. NSDG solution infrastructure is hosted at NIC Data Centre and Data Recovery Centre. NISG has served as advisory and consulting agency to DIT.

DIT has also envisaged the Constellation of Gateways which will include NSDG at the center, various SSDGs (State e-Governance Services Delivery Gateway) and the Domain Gateways. Each gateway will have a service directory called Gateway Services Directory (GSD) which will keep all information regarding services which is available by that gateway. Apart from the GSD, there will be a National Services Directory (NSD) which will serve as central registry for Gateway address resolution to facilitate inter Gateway communication.

== Standards behind the whole Gateway Constellation ==
- Interoperability Interface Protocol (IIP)
- Interoperability Interface Specifications (IIS)
- Inter-Gateway Interconnect Specifications (IGIS)
- Gateway Common Services Specifications (GCSS)

== Platform ==
This project is on J2EE platform and based on the Service Oriented Architecture. It uses web services extensively for publishing its services. Open Source Technologies have been given the highest priority while choosing the Operating System, Application Server, Database and other required tools. The gateway is completely secure. Security compliance of the NSDG as per ISO 17799:2005/BS7799-1:2005.

== Other Gateways ==
NSDG will work at the central level. Apart from this, each state will have its own gateway SSDG (State e-Governance Services Delivery Gateway).

== See also ==
- My Gov

== Notes ==
NSDG and CDAC logos are trademarks of DIT, Govt. of India and C-DAC Mumbai, respectively.
