= Som Mittal =

Indian business executive

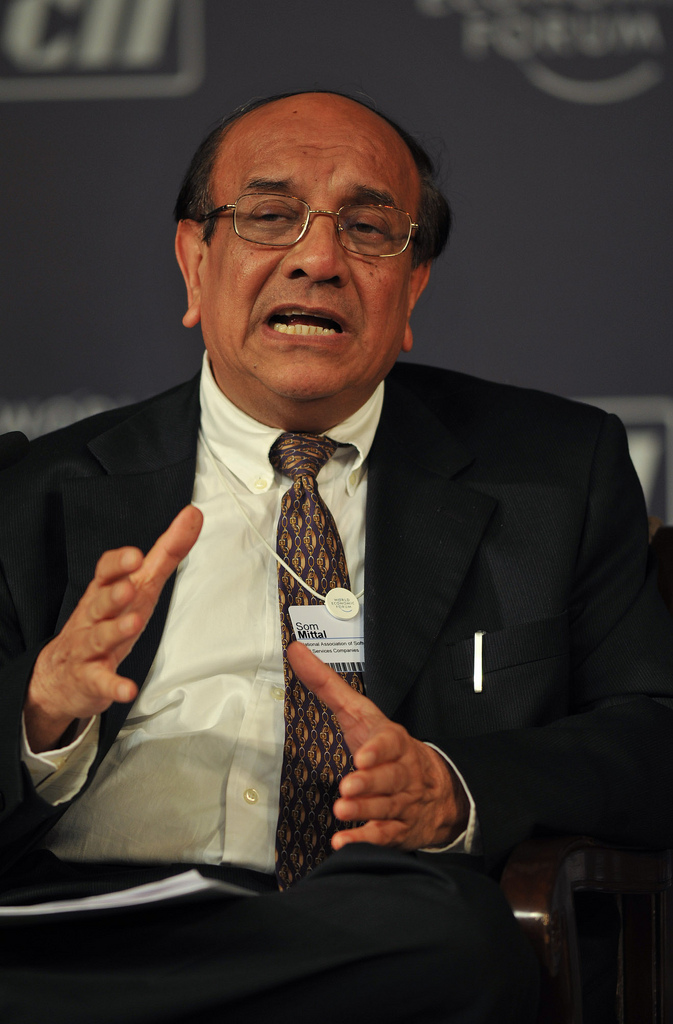

President of NASSCOM
- In office 2007–2014
- Preceded by: Kiran Karnik
- Succeeded by: R. Chandrasekhar

Personal details
- Education: IIT Kanpur (1973); Indian Institute of Management Ahmedabad (1975)

Som Mittal is an Indian information technology and automotive business executive.

== Education and early career ==
Mittal received a bachelor's degree in engineering from Indian Institute of Technology Kanpur and a Master of Business Administration from the Indian Institute of Management, Ahmedabad. He began his career in the engineering and automotive industry serving at Larsen & Toubro, Escorts and Denso from 1975 to 1989.

== IT career ==
In 1989, Mittal joined the multinational IT services and consulting company Wipro. He established their Peripherals Division and was eventually appointed to chief executive of the Server, PC and Services Division.

In 1994, he joined Digital Equipment India Ltd. (DEIL), the Indian subsidiary of the American company Digital Equipment Corporation (DEC), as managing director. During Mittal's tenure, it was acquired by Compaq in 1998 and renamed to Digital GlobalSoft Ltd. After Compaq's 2002 acquisition by Hewlett-Packard, Mittal was appointed as senior vice president of HP Services for Asia-Pacific and Japan in 2006.

In 2008, Mittal joined the NASSCOM as its president. He had chaired NASSCOM's board from 2003 to 2004. As president of NASSCOM, he set up the Data Security Council of India to promote data protection and develops best practices for security and privacy. In the aftermath of the 2010 Satyam scandal, NASSCOM played a crucial role in rebuilding market trust in India's IT industry. During his presidency, NASSCOM expanded its focus to include "internet and mobile content, software products and the domestic information technology (IT) market."

Mittal retired as NASSCOM president on 3 January 2014. He was succeeded by former telecom secretary R. Chandrasekhar.

== Awards and recognition ==
In 2013, the World Information Technology and Services Alliance (WITSA) gave him a lifetime achievement award for dedication to the growth of the Global ICT industry. The Financial Express of India called Mittal an industry "doyen." He has been awarded the Business Leader of the Year by Rotary International; and the Distinguished Alumnus Award by IIT Kanpur (2000).

== Personal life ==
Som Mittal is married to author Vidhu Mittal. She suffered a stroke in 2012.
