= Kiran Karnik =

Indian administrator

President NASSCOM
- In office 2001–2007
- Preceded by: Dewang Mehta
- Succeeded by: Som Mittal

Managing Director, Discovery Networks
- In office 1995–2001

Director, Consortium for Educational Communication
- In office 1991–2005

Personal details
- Born: 16 March 1947 (age 79) Maharashtra
- Education: The Institute of Science, Mumbai; IIM Ahmedabad

Kiran Karnik is a prominent Indian administrator known for his work in the broadcasting and outsourcing industries. Presently he is also serving as a director in Central board of directors of Reserve Bank of India. He is also the chairman, board of directors, of the Indraprastha Institute of Information Technology, Delhi (IIIT-D).

== Early life and education ==
Kiran Karnik was born in 1947 in the Indian state of Maharashtra to Chandraseniya Kayastha Prabhu parents. He completed his BSc (Hons.) in Physics from erstwhile Royal Institute of Science, Bombay University and an MBA from the Indian Institute of Management Ahmedabad.

== Career ==
Karnik's stints in broadcasting and outsourcing were at crucial points in the history of these two industries in India.

=== Broadcasting ===
Karnik joined the Indian Space Research Organisation shortly after it was set up in 1969 and spent nearly 20 years in the organisation. He was part of the team that conceptualised the Satellite Instructional Television Experiment which won wide national and international acclaim, including the first UNESCO-IPDC Prize for rural Communication. Mr. Karnik was Director of the ISRO's Development and Educational Communicational Unit from 1983 to 1991. Mr. Karnik left the ISRO and joined the Consortium for Educational Communication (CEC) as its first director in 1991. CEC was set up by the University Grants Commission to co-ordinate and oversee the functioning of media centres in the universities. In 1995, Mr. Karnik joined Discovery Networks as its managing director in India and oversaw the launch of Discovery Channel in South Asia in August 1995 followed by Animal Planet in 1999. He left the company in 2001.

=== Outsourcing ===
Karnik took up the position of President of NASSCOM in September 2001, after the sudden demise of its founder Dewang Mehta. He made the organisation into the preeminent association for the outsourcing industry and a prominent lobbying group for the concerns of the industry abroad. He left the organisation in 2008.

Subsequently, he was nominated by the government as Chairman of Satyam Computer Services heading a three-member board after the Government of India disbanded the Satyam board owing to severe irregularities and fraud in accounting.

== Other assignments ==
Karnik has been a member of many government committees, including the Prasar Bharati Review Committee, and is currently a member of the Scientific Advisory Council to the Prime Minister and the National Innovation Council.

He is currently the Chairman of the National Committee on Telecom & Broadband at the Confederation of Indian Industry. He is currently the Chairman of the 'Board of Governors' and member of the 'General Council' of the Indraprastha Institute of Information Technology, Delhi. He is also the Chairman of the Governing Body of HelpAge India, the leading non-profit organisation working for the Elderly across India.

== Awards and honours ==
- Awarded the Padma Shri, the fourth highest civilian award by the Government of India in 2007.
- Selected as 'Face of the Year' by Forbes magazine in 2003.
- Awarded the Frank J. Malina Astronautics Medal by the International Astronautical Federation in 1998.

== Books and publications ==
Karnik has authored/edited a large number of publications, and lectures occasionally at major national institutes. He is the author of The Coalition of Competitors: The Story of Nasscom and the IT Industry [HarperCollins, 2012]. He is a regular columnist with national newspapers, including the Economic Times.
