= Dewang Mehta =

Indian businessman (1962–2001)

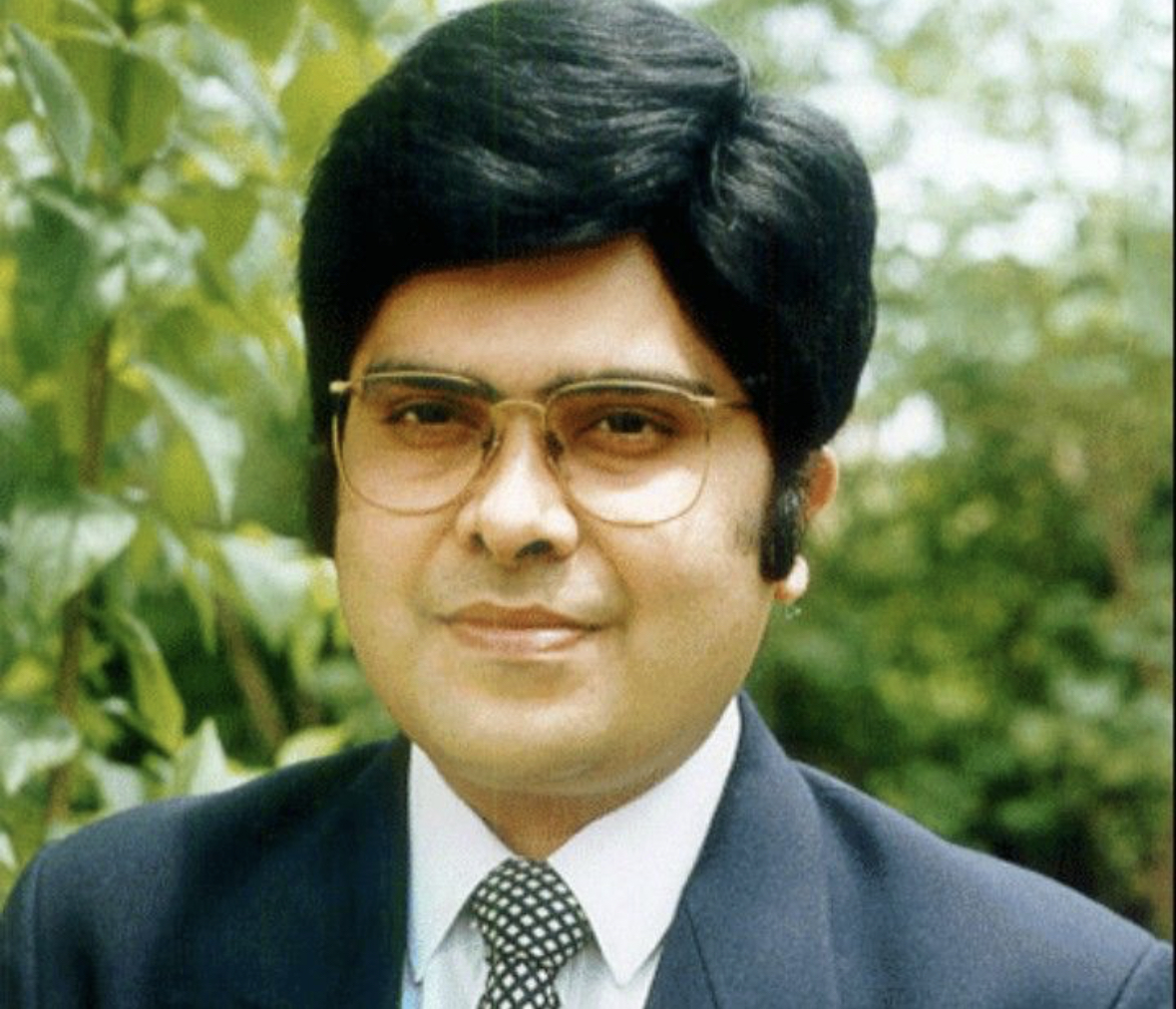

President of NASSCOM
- In office 1991–2001
- Preceded by: Harish Mehta
- Succeeded by: Kiran Karnik

Personal details
- Born: 10 August 1962 Umreth, Gujarat
- Died: 12 April 2001 (aged 38) Sydney, Australia
- Education: Institute of Chartered Accountants of India, Imperial College London

Dewang Mehta (10 August 1962 – 12 April 2001) was the president of NASSCOM between 1991 and 2001. In addition to his role at NASSCOM, he was appointed in 1998 to an IT and Software Development task force, and was also involved in various advisory bodies.

== Personal life ==
Mehta was born in Umreth, Gujarat and studied at Imperial College London.

== Death ==
He died from a heart attack on 12 April 2001 while serving on an IT TaskForce delegation visit to Sydney. The Dewang Mehta Foundation (DMFT) was created in 2002.

== Awards and Recognitions ==
- In 1991, Mehta was awarded the "Computer Graphics Man of the Year" in London for his groundbreaking research in ray tracing and fractals, which advanced animation and visual computing techniques during his early professional phase.
- 1997: He was named "IT Man of the Year" by Dataquest Magazine for his efforts in elevating India's software sector.
- Mehta was named "Software Evangelist of the Year" by Computerworld for 3 consecutive years.(1997,1998,1999)
- "IT Man of the Year" in 2000 by Computerworld.
- In the year 2000, the World Economic Forum chose Mehta as one of the 100 "Global leaders of Tomorrow".
- 2000: Entrepreneur of the Year by Ernst & Young.
