= The Maverick Effect =

Book by Harish S. Mehta

- Author: Harish Mehta
- Language: English
- Subject: Corporate history
- Genre: Non-fiction
- Publisher: HarperCollins
- Publication date: 2022
- Publication place: India
- Pages: 398
- ISBN: 978-9354895296

The Maverick Effect: The Inside Story of India's IT Revolution is a non-fiction corporate history book authored by Harish Mehta. Published by Harper Business in 2022, the book provides a detailed account of the growth and evolution of India's software industry through the journey of NASSCOM and its early members.

== Overview ==
The book is both a memoir and a historical account that narrates the story of India's IT revolution, focusing on the establishment of NASSCOM in 1988. The book highlights the challenges faced by early entrepreneurs in the software industry during the Licence Raj and how their collective efforts led to the industry's global prominence.

== Reception ==
The Maverick Effect has been well received by critics and industry professionals. N. R. Narayana Murthy, one of the key figures in India's IT revolution, endorsed the book, calling it an authoritative narrative on the growth of India's software industry. The book has also been praised for its engaging style and comprehensive coverage of NASSCOM's journey.

=== Reviews ===
- Paul, Nabendu; Gudadinni, Mallikarjun (31 May 2023). "Harish Mehta, The Maverick Effect: The Inside Story of India's IT Revolution, HarperCollins Publishers, 2022. ISBN 978-93-5489-529-6 (PB)". Paradigm: A Management Research Journal. 27 (1). Institute of Management Technology, Ghaziabad: 97–100. doi:10.1177/09718907231167961 – via SAGE Publishers.

== See also ==
- Software Technology Parks of India
