= Keshav R. Murugesh =

Indian businessman

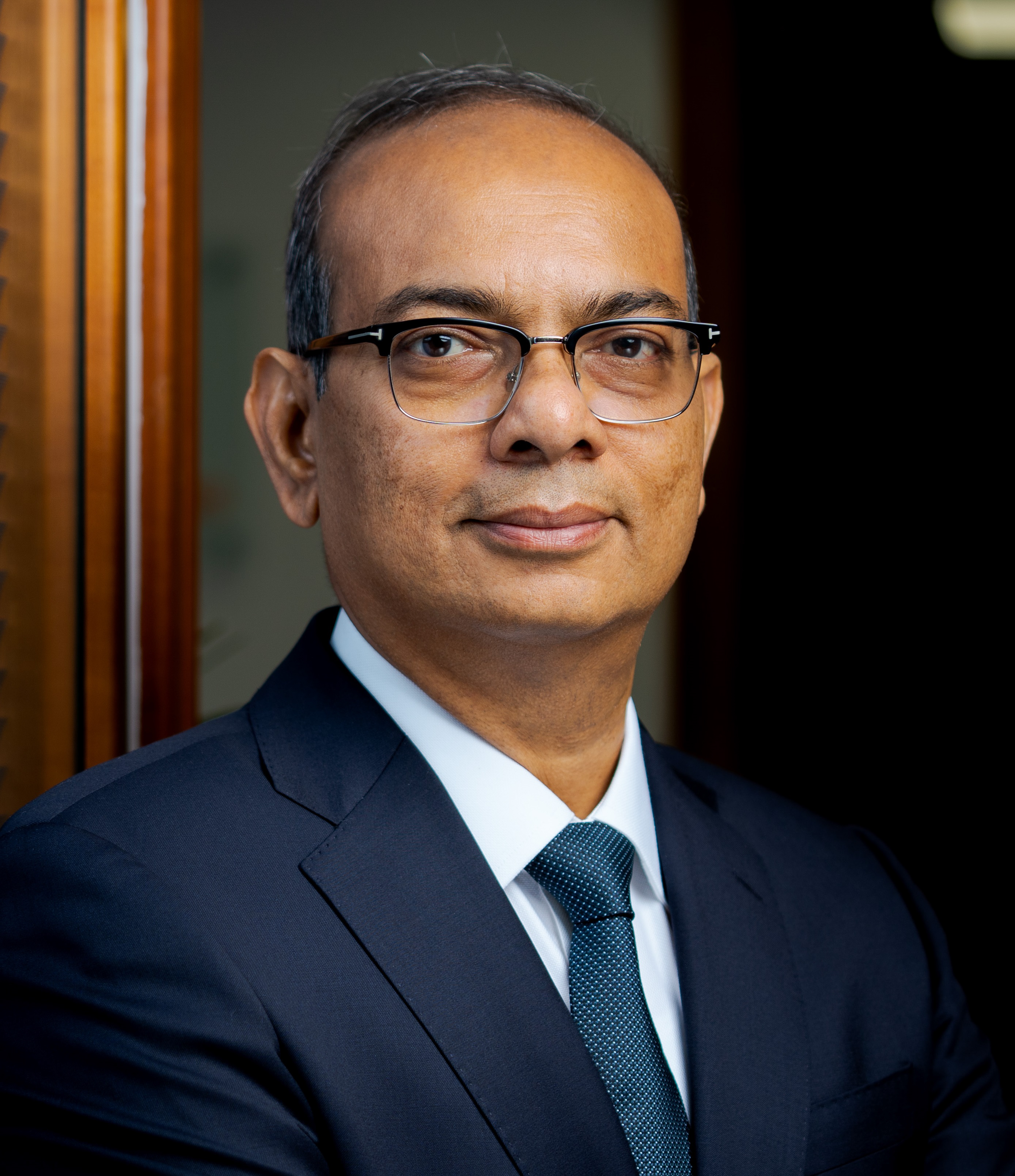
- Keshav R. Murugesh, Group CEO of WNS Holdings
- Born: 17 August 1963 (age 63); Chennai, Tamil Nadu, India
- Education: Institute of Chartered Accountants of India; Andhra University
- Occupations: Group Chief Executive Officer and Director, WNS (Holdings) Ltd. Chairman of NASSCOM 2019-2020

Keshav R. Murugesh is an Indian businessman who is the Group CEO and Member of the Board of Directors of WNS Holdings, a multinational business process management (BPM) company.

Murugesh is the Chairman of the Confederation of Indian Industry UK India Business Forum. He was the Nasscom's Chairperson in 2019-20, and Chairperson of Nasscom BPM Council for two consecutive terms (2015–17). He is the former Chairperson of the NASSCOM Consumer Interest Protection Task Force.

Keshav is a member of The Wall Street Journal (WSJ) CEO Council. He is also an active member of G100 and has addressed many international gatherings – including the Harvard India Conference (2018 & 2023), the Global Boardroom hosted by The Financial Times (2021), the Fortune Global Sustainability Forum (2022), Social Impact Day panel at the Imperial College Business School, London (2021 & 2022), and as part of the panel on India-US relations hosted by ISB and the UCLA Anderson School of Management (2020).

== Education and career ==
Keshav holds a Bachelor of Commerce degree and is a Fellow of The Institute of Chartered Accountants of India.

Keshav started his career in 1989 with the Internal Audit department at ITC Limited, and progressed to become its Vice President, Finance. He joined Syntel Inc. as CFO in 2002, became its president and COO in 2004 and CEO in early 2009. In February 2010, Keshav joined WNS Holdings as its Group CEO.

== Awards ==
Year	Award	Result
2018	CNBC-TV18 'India Business Leader Award'	CNBC-TV18
2018	'India Disruptor of the Year'	CNBC Asia
2015	'Outstanding CEO'	Asia Pacific Entrepreneurship Awards
