= TAGUP =

Advisory group of the Government of India

Agency overview
- Formed: June 2010; 16 years ago
- Jurisdiction: Government of India
- Headquarters: New Delhi
- Agency executive: Nandan Nilekani, Chairman
- Parent department: Ministry of Finance

Technology Advisory Group for Unique Projects (TAGUP) is a Government of India advisory group to look into technology part of 5 large financial sector projects. It is headed by former UIDAI chairman, Nandan Nilekani.

== Areas ==
The committee will make recommendations on the roadmap to roll out the five financial projects are

- Tax Information Network (TIN)
- National Pension Scheme (NPS)
- National Treasury Management Agency (NTMA)
- Expenditure Information Network (EIN)
- Goods and Services Tax (GST)

== Report ==
TAGUP submitted its report in early February 2011 and had the following key recommendations.

- Setting up National Information Utilities (NIUs) as private companies with public purpose.
- Having a dedicated Mission Leader with a Mission Execution Team.

The report also identified common challenges faced by large complex IT projects in the government and provided specific solutions of the evaluation of GST, TIN, EIN, NTMA and NPS at hand. The project reported can be accessed on the Ministry of Finance website.

== Members ==
The members of the committee include

- C. B. Bhave – Former SEBI chairman
- R. Chandrasekhar – IT Secretary
- Nachiket Mor – Board Member at RBI, CRISL, CARE, Sughavazhvu Healthcare, Institute for Financial Management and Research and IKP Centre for Technologies in Public Health
- Dhirendra Swarup – former chairman PFRDA
- S. S. Khan – former Member (CBDT)
- P. R. V. Ramanan – former Member (CBEC)
