= Nucleus Software Exports =

Company in India

Nucleus Software
- Company type: Public
- Traded as: BSE: 531209; NSE: NUCLEUS
- Industry: IT services
- Founded: 1986; 40 years ago
- Headquarters: Noida, Uttar Pradesh, India
- Area served: Worldwide
- Key people: Vishnu R Dusad (Managing Director); Parag Bhise (CEO)
- Revenue: ▲INR 346.22 cr., $57.74 mn (FY 2013–14)
- Net income: ▲INR 64.34 cr., $10.73 mn (FY 2013–14)
- Number of employees: 1,665 (as of 31 March 2017)
- Website: nucleussoftware.com

Nucleus Software Exports Limited (NSE: NUCLEUS) is an Indian IT company in the banking and financial services sector. It offers IT and consultancy services serving a variety of sectors of the banking industry. It is listed on the Bombay Stock Exchange and the National Stock Exchange of India.

The company has its headquarters in Noida, Uttar Pradesh, India, and it operates in more than 50 countries.

== History ==
Nucleus Software started its operations in 1986 in a small office at Thyagraj Nagar, New Delhi. In 1994, the company went global with its entry into Singapore. In 1995, it became a public company, when it issued 201,000 equity shares of Rs 10 each. In 2005–06, Nucleus Software expanded its operations in Europe with a wholly owned subsidiary in Amsterdam. The company was awarded with Gold Shield for Excellence in Financial Reporting 2010 by the Institute of Chartered Accountants of India (ICAI).

== Operations ==
Nucleus Software Exports Limited operates in more than 50 countries and has its headquarters in Noida, Uttar Pradesh, India. As of 31 March 2014, Nucleus Software had 14 offices across 10 countries and seven wholly owned subsidiaries:

- Nucleus Software Solutions Pte. Ltd., Singapore
- Nucleus Software Inc., US
- Nucleus Software Japan Kabushiki Kaisha, Japan
- VirStra i-Technology Services Ltd., India
- Nucleus Software Netherlands B.V., Netherlands
- Nucleus Software Ltd., India
- Nucleus Software Australia Pty. Ltd., Australia

== See also ==
- List of Indian IT companies
