= S. S. Khan =

Indian civil servant

- Occupation: ex–Civil Servant (Indian Revenue Service)

S. S. Khan is an Indian bureaucrat and former member of Central Board of Direct Taxes (CBDT). He is also member of the governments technology advisory group, TAGUP.

== Career ==
He is an officer of the 1972 batch of the Indian Revenue Service.

He served as Director General of Income Tax (Investigation) and Director of Income Tax (Systems) among others in the Income Tax department.
