= Samsung India Software Centre =

Indian software company

Samsung R&D Institute India, Noida
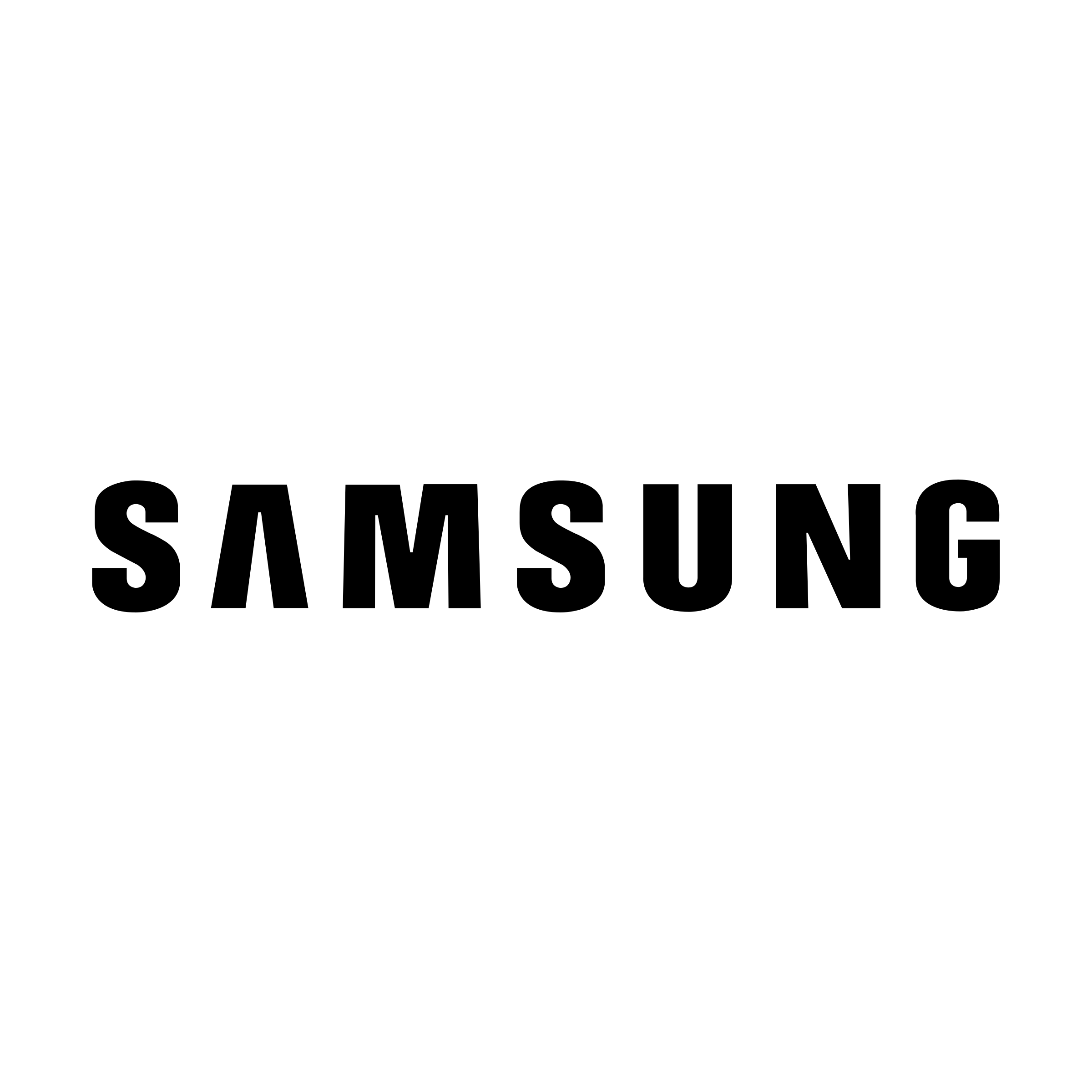
- Founded: 2007
- Headquarters: Noida, India
- Key people: Mr. Kyungyun Roo, Managing Director
- Number of employees: 2300
- Website: https://research.samsung.com/sri-n

Samsung R&D Institute India - Noida (SRI-Noida) is Samsung Electronics’ R&D center with software development ownership of Samsung mobile phones. The R&D center works on mobile software development for Samsung Electronics.

In addition to all mobiles made by Samsung, SRI-Noida specializes in models in the mid-tier segment, particularly ones based on Android Go platform. SRI-Noida also works on Samsung M Series, J Series and A Series.

In 2019, the center won mBillionth award for Samsung Global Goals for its contribution towards United Nations Sustainable Development Goals.

SRI-Noida Sector 62 Noida

SRI-Noida started in 2007 in sector 59 Noida, with regional adaptation followed by multimedia verification. SRI-Noida is engaged in the development and verification of software for all range of mobile phones. The center has grown over the decade and now has more than 2300 employees.

== Research & Innovation ==
Apart from Software Development & Verification, SRI-Noida also works on research in the areas of advanced technologies such as AI, IoT & 5G. SRI-Noida has filed around 300 patents in India & Globally. SRI-N collaborates with academic institutes like IITs for research & innovation in domains of AI, Mobile Security, Healthcare, and Audio Processing. The center also has academic tie-up with BITS Pilani for its corporate M.Tech program.

== SRI-Noida campus ==
The campus is situated in Logix Cyber Park in sector 62 Noida. The campus has onsite amenities such as cafeteria, gym, library, recreation room, healthcare center, etc. The campus is 1.5 km from sector 62 metro station Noida which is on the blue line of Delhi Metro.
