= Kellton =

Indian company

Kellton Tech Solutions Limited.
- Type: Public
- Traded as: BSE: 519602; NSE: KELLTONTEC
- Industry: IT services, IT consulting
- Founder: Niranjan Chintam; Krishna Chintam
- Headquarters: Hyderabad, India
- Key people: Karanjit Singh (CEO, APAC); Srinivas Potluri (CEO, United States)
- Services: Digital Transformation, Enterprise Solutions
- Number of employees: 1800
- Website: www.kellton.com

Kellton Tech Solutions Ltd. (KTSL) is an Indian multinational company specializing in Digital Engineering and technology consulting services, headquartered in Hyderabad, India with offices in United States and Europe. The company reported net revenues of USD 110.6 Million in FY22-23 with more than 1800 employees.

== History ==
Kellton Tech Solutions Ltd. (KTSL) was established in 2009 by Niranjan Chintam and Krishna Chintam. The company's name, ‘Kellton,’ was inspired by the founders' alma maters, the Kellogg School of Management and Wharton Business School.

Early Beginnings (Pre-2009)

The US-based serial entrepreneurs Niranjan Chintam and Krishna Chintam took over VMF Soft Tech Ltd. in 2009 and renamed it to Kellton Tech. Kellton has, since then, expanded their business portfolio by making acquisitions in the US and India.

Kellton (2022 - Present)

In March 2022, Kellton Tech announced its strategic business realignment, OneKellton’ initiative rebranding itself to Kellton and integrating its global operations to enhance client services.

== Locations ==
The company has offices in Hyderabad, Gurgaon, and Pune in India; Singapore in APAC; London, Poland, Ireland, and UAE in EMEA; and at the Dallas, D.C., and NY/NJ areas in the United States. Its head offices are located in Hyderabad, India, and Plano, Texas, USA.

== Acquisitions ==
- 2013: Acquired Supremesoft Global Inc, Inc. US based IT consulting company
- 2014: Acquired Vivos Professional Services, LLC, USA focusing in the life sciences and healthcare service
- 2014: Acquired eVantage Technologies Inc., US-based IT consulting company
- 2015: Acquired US-based Prosoft Technology Group, ERP-EAI provider
- 2016: Acquired US-based Bokanyi Consulting, an enterprise, analytics and cloud services provider
- 2017: Acquired US-based Lenmar Group of Companies, an IT services and solutions group with presence in banking and financial services
- 2019: Acquired US-based firm known as Tivix that develops cloud-connected web and mobile applications
