= National Institute for Smart Government =

Indian organisation

- Abbreviation: NISG
- Formation: 2002
- Type: Non-profit organization
- Headquarters: YSR Bhavan, Financial District, Nanakramguda, Rajendra Nagar, Hyderabad, Telangana, India
- Region served: India
- Affiliations: NASSCOM; NASSCOM Foundation
- Website: www.nisg.org

The National Institute for Smart Government (NISG) is a non-for profit company incorporated in 2002 by the Government and NASSCOM with its head office at Hyderabad, India.

== See also ==
- MyGov
