= NASSCOM =

Non-governmental Indian trade association

National Association of Software and Service Companies
- NASSCOM's New logo
- Abbreviation: NASSCOM
- Formation: 1 March 1988; 38 years ago
- Type: Non-governmental trade association
- Purpose: Policy advocacy
- Headquarters: Noida, Uttar Pradesh, India & New Delhi, Delhi, India
- Services: Business promotion, networking, policy reforms
- Fields: Information Technology (IT); Business Process Management (BPM)
- Members: Over 3,200 companies
- President: Rajesh Nambiar
- Chairperson: Sindhu Gangadharan
- Vice Chairperson: Srikanth Velamakanni
- Affiliations: NASSCOM Foundation; National Institute for Smart Government (NISG); Data Security Council of India (DSCI); Sector Skills Council NASSCOM
- Website: www.nasscom.in

National Association of Software and Service Companies (NASSCOM) is an Indian non-governmental trade association and advocacy group that primarily serves the Indian technology industry. Founded in 1988, NASSCOM operates as a nonprofit organization and serves as a key entity within the Indian technology sector.

== Events ==
In 2013, NASSCOM initiated a program to promote 10,000 startups in India by 2023. NASSCOM sponsors events that target startups in India. Events include:

- NASSCOM Product Conclave;
- NASSCOM Emerge 50;
- Global In-house Centers Summit;
- Big Data Analytics Summit;
- Diversity & Inclusion Summit;
- HR Summit;
- NASSCOM Leadership Forum;
- NASSCOM Engineering Summit;
- Annual Information Security Summit, and
- NASSCOM Innotrek.

NASSCOM organized the NASSCOM International SME Conclave in January 2019 and the FISITA World Automotive Congress in October 2018.

== Collaborations ==
The Telangana AI Mission (T-AIM) collaborated with NASSCOM to implement the Investor Connect program, benefiting 30 startups in India as part of the Revv Up accelerator program. Additionally, NASSCOM has established multiple partnerships, including one with the Karnataka State Higher Education Council.

== Membership ==
NASSCOM's membership includes organizations engaged in software development, software services, and IT-enabled or BPO services. The organization's core focus has been on ensuring high service quality standards and upholding intellectual property rights within the Indian software and BPO industries. As of June 2007, more than 1,100 information technology companies in India were members of NASSCOM, including domestic software and ITES companies, as well as multinationals operating within India.

Employees and members of the executive council of NASSCOM include:

- Rajesh Nambiar, President, Nasscom (From 2024)
- Sindhu Gangadharan, Chairperson, SVP & MD, SAP Labs India
- Debjani Ghosh, Former President
- Krishnan Ramanujam, President - Service Lines (From 2022), Tata Consultancy Services
- Rostow Ravanan, Chairman & CEO, Alfahive; Chair, nasscom foundation
- Sandeep Dutta, Senior Managing Director & Head, India Business Accenture India
- Keshav R. Murugesh, Group CEO, WNS Global Services
- Anu Acharya, CEO, Map My Genome
- Arundhati Bhattacharya, India Chairperson and CEO, Salesforce India
- Amit Chadha, CEO and Managing Director, L&T Technology Services
- Akhilesh Tuteja, Partner and Head Global Cyber Security Consulting practice, KPMG Advisory Services
- Daisy Devassy Chittilapilly, President India SAARC, Cisco Systems India
- Harita Gupta, Head of APAC, Sutherland
- Jagdish Mitra, Chief Strategy Officer and Head of Growth, Tech Mahindra
- Jayendran Venugopal, Chief Product and Technology Officer, Flipkart
- Kishor Patil, Co-founder, KPIT Technologies
- Maulik Bhansali, CEO, Netweb
- Prativa Mohapatra, Vice President Managing Director, Adobe Systems India
- Rahul Singh, COO Corporate Functions, HCL Technologies Ltd
- Sandip Patel, MD, IBM India And South Asia
- Sanjay Gupta, Country Head and Vice President, Google India
- Satish H C, Exec VP and Co-Head of Delivery, Infosys
- Sriram Subramanya, CEO, Integra Software Services
- Srikanth Velamakanni, CEO, Fractal
- Tejal Patil, General Counsel, Wipro
- Vidya Srinivasan, SVP Infrastructure and Risk, Genpact India
- Anand Ramamoorthy, MD, Micron India
- Santhosh Viswanathan, VP & MD, India Region, Intel India
- Puneet Chandok, President, Microsoft India and South Asia

== Founders ==
Among the founders of NASSCOM were Harish Mehta, Ashank Desai, Nandan Nilekani, KV Ramani, Saurabh Srivastava. These industry leaders, along with other key figures in the Indian IT industry, collaborated to form NASSCOM to promote and represent the interests of the software and services industry in India. Notably, NASSCOM has evolved over the years under the leadership of various industry professionals, and its operations have expanded to include IT and business process automation services.

The 2022 book The Maverick Effect by Harish Mehta covers the story of NASSCOM’s inception and how it shaped the Indian IT industry.

== See also ==
- Information Technology in India
- List of Indian IT companies
- National Institute for Smart Government
