= WNS Global Services =

Business process outsourcing company in India

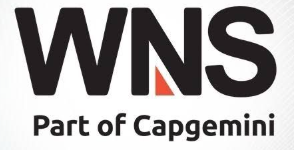
- Formerly: Speedwing World Network Services (1996 to 2002)
- Type: Public
- Traded as: NYSE: WNS
- Industry: Business process management, outsourcing, IT consulting
- Founded: 1996
- Headquarters: New York, London and Mumbai
- Area served: Worldwide
- Key people: Aiman Ezzat (CEO, Capgemini); Keshav R Murugesh (CEO, WNS)
- Revenue: ▼US $1.3149 billion (FY25)
- Number of employees: 66,000
- Parent: British Airways (1996 to 2002); Capgemini (2025 – Present)
- Website: www.wns.com

WNS (Holdings) Limited is a global business process management (BPM) company and a subsidiary of Capgemini. Its operations include finance and accounting, customer service, procurement and data analytics. The company is headquartered in New York, London and Mumbai.

In October 2025, the company became a subsidiary of Capgemini following a $3.3 billion acquisition.

== History ==
WNS was started as "Speedwing World Network Services" in 1996 as a part of British Airways in Mumbai, India. It was created to manage the airline’s back-office and operational processes. In 2002, the private equity firm Warburg Pincus acquired a 64 percent stake in WNS from British Airways for $50 million. That same year, WNS made its first acquisition, the UK-based automobile claims handler Town & Country Assistance. Between 2004 and 2009, WNS established delivery centers in Sri Lanka, the Philippines, Costa Rica, Romania, and the UK. It also acquired the US-based Trinity Partners in 2005.

In July 2006, WNS had an IPO and was listed on the New York Stock Exchange, the 10th company from India to trade on the NYSE. As of March 2006, the company employed over 10,000 people. As part of the IPO, British Airways sold its 14.6% share in the company for approximately $96 million. On the eve of the IPO, Forbes wrote about WNS and how its business processing outsourcing model--meaning outsourcing back-office work to cheaper overseas locations--could be a "solid" investment opportunity. It judged WNS' revenue for 2004-05 and 2006 to date to make WNS one of the two top processing outsourcing companies in India.

In 2012, WNS entered South Africa by acquiring Fusion Outsourcing Services. Subsequent acquisitions included Value Edge Research Services, Denali Sourcing Services, and HealthHelp In the 2020s, WNS's acquisitions also moved into artificial intelligence. It acquired Vuram in 2022, The Smart Cube in 2023, and OptiBuy. In 2025, it acquired Kipi.ai.

WNS' primary competitors are companies like Cognizant and Genpact, which also house thousands of employees in low-cost countries like India for software coding and application maintenance.

=== Acquisition by Capgemini ===
On October 17, 2025, Capgemini completed its acquisition of WNS for $3.3 billion.
