= Sankar Datta =

Indian academic and professional development worker (born 1958)

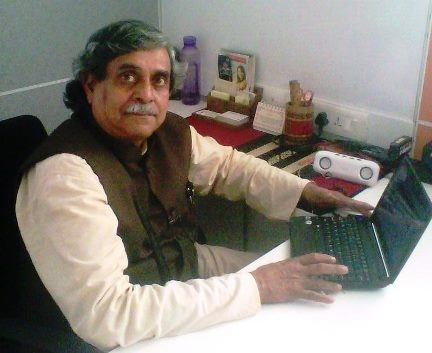
- Born: 17 February 1958 (age 68); Jamshedpur, Bihar, India
- Occupations: Development Professional, Academic, Professor
- Known for: PRADAN, BASIX (India), The Livelihood School, Microfinance, Livelihood
- Spouse: Sonja Datta
- Children: Soumya Sankar

Dr. Sankar Datta (born 17 February 1958), is an Indian academic and professional development worker. Since the early 1980s, Datta is known for his engagement in rural livelihood promotion and support activities. Most of his field works have been in the undulating terrains of Central India, such as, Chhota Udaipur, in the west, and Jharkhand in the east, which are inhabited by various tribal groups.

Datta is a management graduate from the very first batch of Institute of Rural Management Anand, Gujarat, a graduate in Agriculture from G. B. Pant University of Agriculture and Technology and Ph.D. in Economics from Sardar Patel University.

== Background ==
Sankar Datta is a Development Evangelist, well known for his work in the field on livelihood support, as a part of institutions like PRADAN and BASIX. He was a professor at Azim Premji University, Bengaluru, and leading the Livelihood Initiative of the university as a Member of the Faculty of Institute of Rural Management, Anand (IRMA) and Indian Institute of Management-Ahmedabad (IIM-A). Having started his journey as a Spearhead Team Leader organizing soybean farmers in central parts of India, he continued working with small rural producers as part of the founding teams of BASIX/ Indian Grameen Services along with Vijay Mahajan, Deep Joshi, and PRADAN, two notable livelihood promotion and support institutions of India before joining the university.

He was also the member of faculty of Institute of Rural Management Anand, as well as policy forums such as Working Group of the Planning Commission (India) for the 12th Five-Year Plan (India).

Datta is known in India's development domain for his work in the area of Livelihoods.

== Early life ==
Sankar Datta was born 17 February 1958, in Jamshedpur, Jharkhand (it was Bihar then), India. He spent his early childhood in Bihar. He did his schooling from Patha Bhavana, Santiniketan.

== Academic background ==
Datta's early school education was done at Patha Bhavana, Viswa Bharati, Santiniketan, an institution founded by Rabindranath Tagore. He completed his post-graduation in Rural Management from Institute of Rural Management Anand, after completing his graduation in Agriculture (B Sc Ag & AH) from G. B. Pant University of Agriculture and Technology. He did his Ph.D on Factors Affecting Performance of Village Level Organisations in the area of Economics from Sardar Patel University. After that he pursued higher studies in Agribusiness management from the Cornell University.

== Professional career ==
=== As an academic ===
- Datta is presently Professor, leading the Livelihood Initiatives.
- He was the Dean of The Livelihood School (now the Institute of Livelihood Research and Training) set up by BASIX, undertaking research and training promoting livelihoods, especially of the poor households of the country;
- He was a member of the faculty in Institute of Rural Management, Anand (IRMA) and Ravi Mathai Centre for Educational Innovation (RM-CEI) of Indian Institute of Management Ahmedabad.
- He was also a visiting faculty for several institutions like national Institute of rural development and panchayati raj in hyderabad, Xavier School of Rural Management (XSRM, Erstwhile XIMB-RM), ICAR-National Academy of Agricultural Research Management (ICAR-NAARM), National Institute of Agricultural Marketing (CCS NIAM), KSRM, TISS among others.

=== As a practitioner and development Professional ===
Datta has been closely associated with promotion of Rural Livelihoods as a Practitioner.

- He was in-charge of operations while setting up the BASIX group of Companies, a new generation livelihood support institution
- He had initiated and headed the first livelihood project of PRADAN, a major livelihood support NGO of India
- He was a Team-Leader of the Spearhead Team responsible for promoting soybean in MP and organizing the network of producer co-operatives

== Other professional engagements ==
- Served on the Board of several institutions including Indian Grameen Services, Village Financial Services Ltd, IndusTree Crafts Ltd. Purbanchal Maitree Development Society.
- Member of the Advisory Committee of Center for Management in Agriculture (CMA) of the IIM-Ahmedabad
- Member of the Livelihood Advisory Group of the Sustainable Livelihoods India Initiative organized by ACCESS Development Services.
- Member of the Planning Commission Working Group for the 12th Five-Year Plan on MGNREGA.

== Publications ==
Apart from presenting various papers on the livelihood challenges faced by the poor in various national and international calamities he has published several books. One of his frequently used publications is the Resource Book for Livelihood Promotion, co-authored with Vijay Mahajan and Gitali Thakur. He has also been involved in designing and editing the first five years of the State of India's Livelihood Report.

== Expertise ==
- Rural Development in General and livelihood promotion & support in specific.
- Dry land farming and Value Chain Management
- Gandhian economics for supporting livelihoods
- Value Chain Development
