= BASIX (India) =

- Type: Private
- Industry: Development
- Founded: 1996
- Headquarters: Hyderabad, Telangana, India
- Area served: India
- Key people: Vijay Mahajan (founder)
- Services: Livelihoods Promotion
- Revenue: Rs 53 crores (US$ 13.5 million) (2007)
- Net income: Rs 4 crores (US$ 1 million) (2007)
- Total assets: Rs 296.5 crores (US$ 75 million) (2007)
- Number of employees: 2583 (2006)
- Website: basixindia.com

BASIX is an institution concerning the promotion of livelihood established in 1996 in India. It is headquartered in Hyderabad, Telangana. BASIX Social Enterprise Group consists of several companies who deals with community development & livelihoods promotion activities and development consultancy.

== BASIX Group ==
BASIX is the brand name of a group of companies, which are:

- Bhartiya Samruddhi Investments and Consulting Services Ltd. (BASICS Ltd), is the holding company through which equity and debt investments are made in the group companies. It set up two fund based companies - Bhartiya Samruddhi Finance Ltd, a micro-finance NBFC in 1997 and Krishna Bhima Samruddhi Local Area Bank Ltd in 2001. It also promoted BASIX Academy for Building Lifelong Employability Limited, BASIX Consulting and Training Services Limited, BASIX Krishi Samruddhi Limited, BASIX Sub-K iTransactions Limited and Ctran Consulting Limited.
- Indian Grameen Services, is a non-profit company, registered under the Section 25 of the Companies Act. IGS was promoted by Professional Assistance for Development Action (PRADAN). Established in 1987 by Vijay Mahajan, Deep Joshi and Sankar Datta, it engages in capacity building, research and development to extend commercial services for promoting livelihood opportunities for rural producers. During 1988–1995, IGS focused initially on identifying and developing livelihoods, then on provision of technical assistance and support services, and then on providing marketing support.
- Bhartiya Samruddhi Finance Ltd. (Samruddhi), an RBI registered NBFC, is engaged in micro-credit, retailing insurance and providing technical assistance in agriculture, business, and institutional development to its customers.
- Krishna Bhima Samruddhi Local Area Bank Ltd. (KBSLAB), is an RBI licensed bank providing micro-credit and savings services in three backward districts, Raichur, Gulbarga, and Mahbubnagar.
- Sarvodaya Nano Finance Ltd. (Sarvodaya), is an RBI registered NBFC, owned by women's self-help groups, and managed by BASICS Ltd.

== Strategy and activities ==
To offer agricultural and business development services, such as input supply, training, technical assistance and market linkages, in a cost-effective manner, poor households are organized into groups, informal associations and sometimes cooperatives or producer companies. The formation of such groups and making them function effectively requires institutional development services. BASIX aims to provide three services concerning this, which it calls the Livelihood Triad:

- Livelihood Financial Services: including micro-savings, micro-credit, and micro-insurance.
- Agricultural and Business Development Services: through local value addition, non-financial risk mitigation, productivity improvement, and alternative market linkages
- Institutional Development Services: an attempt to evolve and reinforce a set of behavioural norms and processes for a group of people to act in a sustainable manner, to achieve the purpose for which they together.

BASIX also provides sectoral and policy research services, feasibility studies and other consultancy services using companies within the group, with a focus on contributing to the knowledge and practice of livelihood promotion. Its customers have included international bodies, the Government of India, and several state governments.

== Outreach ==
BASIX works in 20,000 villages in 106 districts in the states of Telangana, Karnataka, Tamil Nadu, Orissa, Jharkhand, Maharashtra, Madhya Pradesh, Rajasthan, Bihar, Chhattisgarh, West Bengal, Delhi and Assam.

Since the inception of the group, BASIX has cumulatively disbursed Rs 893 crore (US$220 million) through nearly 578,000 cumulative loans. The loan outstanding as of 31 March 2007 was Rs 234 crore (US$58 million) for the group with over 347,651 customers. As much as 41% of the loans went to the farm sector, which is severely impaired for want of credit and 59% to women, who tend to be financially excluded.

Savings services were provided through KBSLAB, by linking urban BSFL customers with banks or post offices and through Self-help groups in the case of Sarvodaya. The total coverage was 450,000.
BASIX insures its customers against risks like death, spouse's death, critical illness, hospitalization and permanent disability. It has rainfall-index based crop insurance, livestock insurance and micro enterprise asset insurance and deposit insurance for savings customers. In 2006–07, this coverage was extended to 473,932 asset owners. Over 10,000 cumulative claims have been settled amounting to Rs 36 million.

BASIX provided Agriculture/Business Development Services for productivity enhancement, non-insurance risk mitigation, local value addition and market linkages. These services were extended to 72,000 producers. Fees collected towards providing these services amounted to Rs 1.6 crore.

BASIX provides Institutional Development Services to Self-Help groups, SHG federations, Mutual Benefit Trusts, Producer Groups and Cooperatives, to aid producers' livelihood activities. These services were extended to 25,110 groups, with over 683,000 members. Fees collected towards providing these services amounted to Rs 2.4 crore.

== See also ==
- Vijay Mahajan
- Deep Joshi
- Sankar Datta
