= Tribhuvan Sahkari University =

Business school in India

"Tribhuvan" Sahkari University
- Former names: Institute of Rural Management, Anand
- Motto: Empowering rural people through sustaining processes
- Type: Institutes of National Importance
- Established: 1979; 47 years ago (as IRMA); 2025; 1 year ago (as TSU)
- Founder: Verghese Kurien
- Vice-Chancellor: Dr. S. P. Singh
- Location: Anand, Gujarat, India; 22.5384°N 72.9729°E
- Campus: Urban, 60 acres (0.24 km^{2})
- Website: www.tsu.ac.in
- Location within Gujarat

"Tribhuvan" Sahkari University (Abbreviate: TSU), previously known as the Institute of Rural Management Anand (IRMA) and now IRMA comes under the umbrella of TSU, is a business school located in Anand City, Gujarat, India. Its mandate is to support the professional management of rural organizations. It was founded on the belief shaped by Verghese Kurien's work in dairy cooperatives that effective rural development depends on professional management. This belief had a significant impact on the country's dairy industry, including the White Revolution (also known as Operation Flood).

The institute was established with the support of the Swiss Agency for Development and Cooperation, the Government of India, the former Indian Dairy Corporation, the National Dairy Development Board (NDDB), and the Government of Gujarat. The IRMA campus was designed by the architect Achyut Kanvinde.

The annual convocation of IRMA, now part of Tribhuvan Sahkari University, is distinguished by its emphasis on Indian culture and traditions. Graduating participants traditionally wear a kurta and pyjama and receive an angavastram along with their degree certificate from the Chief Guest, reflecting the institution's commitment to simplicity and cultural heritage.

In 2022, Amit Shah, the Minister of Home Affairs and Minister of Cooperation of the Government of India was Chief Guest of the conference. Former Prime Minister Indira Gandhi attended IRMA's first annual convocation in 1982.

== History ==
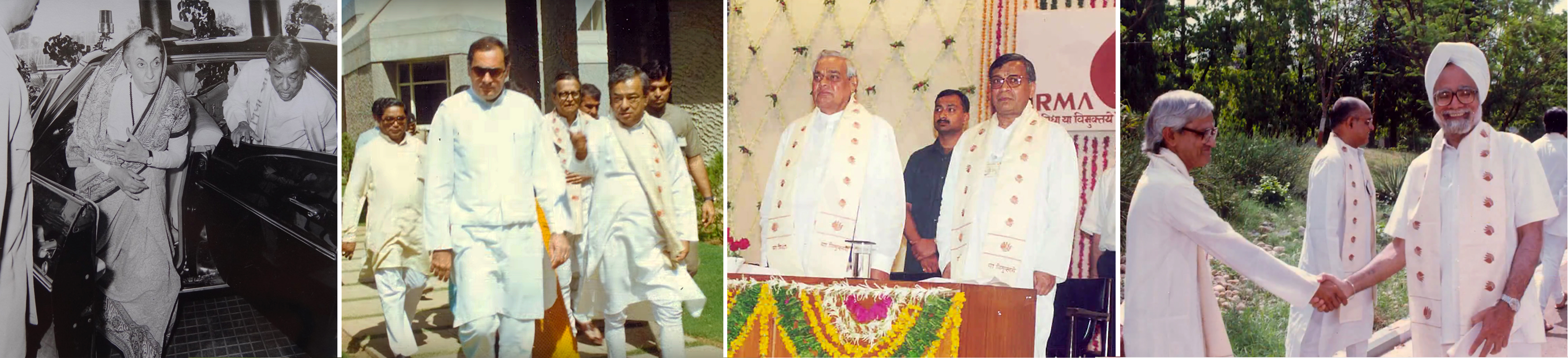
Over the years, several former Prime Ministers of India, including Smt Indira Gandhi, Shri Rajiv Gandhi, Shri Atal Bihari Vajpayee, and Shri Manmohan Singh, have visited IRMA to attend its Annual Convocation ceremonies as Chief Guests.

Michael Halse, then a Food and Agriculture Organization (FAO) planning adviser with NDDB, was one of the members responsible for conceptualizing this new discipline of rural management. Another person involved with the institute was the organizational behavior academic Dr. Kamla Chowdhry, who also served briefly as the director of the institute and played a key mentoring role in its formative years. Ravi J. Matthai, the former director of the Indian Institute of Management, Ahmedabad, contributed through his documented learning from the Jawaja experiment. Matthai stressed the need for a new type of management education for working on rural development problems. This system would be different from the conventions found in the Indian Institutes of Management.

The institute was originally established as a center for management and consultancy for rural development, as part of the second phase of the Operation Flood program. Under the leadership of Dr. Verghese Kurien, IRMA rapidly expanded its mandate to professionalize the management of rural producers' organizations and to develop a body of knowledge in the field of rural management.

Among the institution's pioneering faculty was Leela Dube, a distinguished anthropologist and equity-feminist scholar whose work proved foundational during its early years. Her fieldwork across five Southeast Asian countries significantly contributed to placing the organization on the international social science research map.

Since its inception, the focus of IRMA has been on strengthening the management capacities in non-governmental organizations and organizations that are controlled by users of the services (rather than the conventional capital investor-centered business corporation). IRMA claims that its branding and commitment to a unique field of management make it unique among management institutes of India.

== Academics ==
IRMA offers various full-time and part-time postgraduate programs as well as diplomas.

=== Admissions ===
IRMA offers different academic programs and has admission processes and eligibility criteria, respectively. The selection process for admission in PGDM(RM), FPM(RM), RM(X), and MDPs depends on the specific program. IRMA also conducts its Written Ability Test (WAT) and Personal Interviews (PI) of selected candidates.

=== Rankings ===
University and college rankings

Business/Management – India
- NIRF (2024): 54
- Outlook India (2022): 20

IRMA was ranked 54th in the Management category of the 2025 ranking of the National Institutional Ranking Framework (NIRF). It was ranked 20th in Outlook's "Top Private MBA Institutions" of 2022.

IRMA was ranked 5th Best B School in the Chronicle India B-School Survey 2019. IRMA was ranked the 5th best B-school among the top 75 private B-schools of India and 10th overall among the top 100 B-schools of India, as per Times B-School Survey 2019. IRMA Ranked 8th in the UTD Top 10 Indian Business School Ranking for Research.

=== Dr. Verghese Kurien Memorial Lecture ===
To commemorate the memory of the founder of the institute, the annual "Dr. Verghese Kurien Memorial Lecture" was instituted in 2012, to be held on his birth anniversary.

- 2012, Inaugural Lecture: M. S. Swaminathan
- 2013, 2nd Lecture: Vijay Shankar Vyas
- 2014, 3rd Lecture: Raghuram Rajan
- 2015, 4th Lecture: Arvind Subramanian
- 2016, 5th Lecture: Vikram Singh Mehta
- 2017, 6th Lecture: Dr. Ramesh Chand
- 2018, 7th Lecture: Amitabh Kant
- 2019, 8th Lecture: Dr. P. S. Goel
- 2020, 9th Lecture: Krishnamurthy V. Subramanian
- 2021, 10th Lecture: Arun Maira

== Notable faculty ==
- Ravi J. Matthai - Management education administrator, noted for establishing the Indian Institute of Management, Ahmedabad, and the Institute of Rural Management, Anand.
- Leela Dube - Anthropologist and equity-feminist scholar
- Yoginder K Alagh - Noted Indian economist, former Union Minister of the Government of India & ex-Chairman of IRMA.
- Vivek Bhandari - Indian professor & ex-Director of IRMA.
- Deep Joshi - Indian social worker, NGO activist, and a recipient of the Magsaysay award. Ex-Chairman of IRMA.

== Notable alumni ==
- Sanjay Ghose - Founder, URMUL Rural Health Research and Development Trust and Charka Development Communication Network
- Vishal Narain - Academic, Researcher & Public Policy Analyst
- Satish Babu (PRM3) - Director, International Centre for Free and Open Source Software (ICFOSS).
- Raju Narisetti - Founder of Mint (newspaper), Senior Vice-president, News Corporation
- Sandeep Dikshit - Member of Parliament of 14th Lok Sabha and 15th Lok Sabha representing East Delhi
- Daman Singh - Indian writer and daughter of Former Prime Minister of India, Manmohan Singh.
- Amir Ullah Khan - Indian economist. Professor at the Dr. Marri Channa Reddy Human Resource Development Institute of Telangana of the Government of Telangana
- G. V. L. Narasimha Rao - National Spokesperson of Bharatiya Janata Party
- Syed Safawi - Managing Director and Group CEO of VLCC, Ex-CEO of Viom Networks.
- Praveen Morchhale - 65th National Film Awards winner and UNESCO Gandhi Medal Winner, film director-writer. Notable works include: Widow of Silence, Walking With The Wind, Behind Veils, and Barefoot to Goa.
