= Financial Access at Birth =

Financial Access at Birth is a policy initiative proposed by Professor Bhagwan Chowdhry of UCLA Anderson and ISB. The initiative aims to place $100 in an electronic savings account for every child born in the world. The initiative has attracted some prominent supporters, including Peter Singer, a well-known philosopher, and Vijay Mahajan, an Indian social entrepreneur. The JAM trinity in India has incorporated two out of the three features from FAB, A digital identity and a bank account for every individual.

== Premise ==
The concept was conceived during a dinner conversation between Chowdhry and Mahajan. Mahajan, who is a well-known leader of microfinance in India, has argued that a single deposit of a $100 at the time of birth is perfectly feasible and that the cost for the scheme would be much lower than already existing welfare programs in many developing countries It is argued that by giving a bank account and one-time deposit, there is an incentive for families (particularly in more remote areas) to register the birth of their child. Further, the ownership of an account would encourage the family to increase their knowledge and access to the formal banking system while also encouraging banks to increase their reach to traditionally more financially excluded groups and geographies of a country. The $100 could stay in the child’s account until the child reaches adolescence, therefore ensuring that parents do not make withdrawals. Using biometric identification could further reduce the possibility of fraud.

While critics of FAB have pointed out that FAB may actually incentivise people to have more children, Chowdhry argues that it could encourage parents to increase the survivability of their children into adolescence, thus incentivising a reduction in the number of children families decide to have, as there is research to suggest that survivability reduces the number of planned births.

== Role of technology ==
The role of technology is viewed as essential by proponents of FAB since it will help reduce costs and build an electronic delivery channel and electronic backbone for both financial and other transfers. One of the barriers to fostering financial inclusion for the poor is cost as the traditional solution of a bank branch is simply not going to work to reach everyone. Technology, however, can help make reaching the “last mile” more affordable.

Further, proponents would argue that information management and correspondence banking could allow for the realization of cost benefits from economies of scale of large volumes of new accounts. With an initial cash transfer of $100, the initial deposit could go far towards making the program an economically viable proposition by generating the demand to reach large volumes. That is, banks or telecom companies that may think it is not cost effective for small transactions can recover costs, when there are a large number of these accounts—such volumes would support the business case and cover the fixed costs.

== Program funding ==
According to Chowdhry, each country will contribute one-fiftieth of one percent of their GDP towards creating FAB accounts . However, the sources of finance for financing the initial payment are vast and varied from country to country. While some countries may already have large enough welfare budgets and reasonably low birth rates, others could fund the program via foreign aid or donations from diaspora. Assuming that more well-off families will not claim FAB accounts would probably bring down the cost in some countries.

== FAB and Center for Financial Inclusion ==
The Center for Financial Inclusion at ACCION International began hosting FAB in September 2010. They have engaged many experts and organizations to examine the implementation and to identify countries for FAB pilots. The Founders of FAB include Bhagwan Chowdhry, Vijay Mahajan and Francisco Gil Díaz, a former finance minister of Mexico.

== In popular culture ==
Chowdhry made a cameo appearance in the TV show, Entourage, where he explained the concept of FAB to Vincent’s then girlfriend Sophia Lear.
