= Deep Joshi =

Indian activist

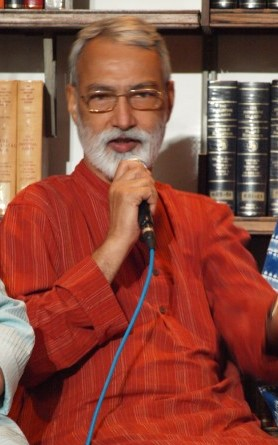
- Born: 1947 (age 78–79); Puriyag, Pithoragarh district, Uttarakhand
- Education: Massachusetts Institute of Technology, MIT Sloan School of Management, Motilal Nehru National Institute of Technology
- Occupations: social worker, Executive Director, PRADAN. Chairman Institute of Rural Management, Anand
- Known for: NGO/Social work, 2009 recipient of Magsaysay award and one of the recipient of 2010 Padma Shri Award.
- Spouse: Sheela Joshi
- Children: One son (Uday) and one daughter (Girija)
- Awards: Magsaysay award (2009)

Deep Joshi is an Indian social worker and NGO activist and a recipient of the Magsaysay award in 2009. He is recognised for his leadership in bringing professionalism to the NGO movement in India. He co-founded a non-profit organisation, Professional Assistance for Development Action (PRADAN), of which he was the Executive Director till 2007. He was awarded the 2009 Magsaysay award for Community Leadership for his work for "development of rural communities". He is also a recipient of the civilian honour of Padma Shri.

== Early life ==
Deep Joshi was born in 1947 in the village of Puriyag in a remote area of Pithoragarh district, Uttarakhand in the Himalayas to Harikrishan Joshi, a farmer, and was one of seven children.

He received his early education at the local primary school, and later he took his engineering degree from Motilal Nehru National Institute of Technology, Allahabad and also holds a masters engineering degree from Massachusetts Institute of Technology (MIT) and another on management from Sloan School, MIT.

== Career ==
Returning to India, Deep Joshi worked with the Systems Research Institute, and as a programme officer with the Ford Foundation in India. In the coming decades he worked in the field of rural development and livelihood promotion. In 1983, he co-founded a non-profit organisation, Professional Assistance for Development Action (PRADAN), that recruits college graduates to do community work, which recruits university-educated youth from campuses across India and trains them for grassroots work. Pradan was jointly awarded NGO of the Year 2006 at the first ever India NGO Award event. PRADAN is involved in building self-help groups, developing land and water resource, natural resource management, forest-based livelihood, horticulture and agriculture. Pradan formed its first SHG in Alwar, Rajasthan, in 1987. Colleagues at PRADAN include Vijay Mahajan and Sankar Datta.

He also advised the Government of India on poverty alleviation strategies and also was a member of the Working Group on Rainfed Areas for the Eleventh Five Year Planning Commission, Govt of India.

In 2006, Deep received the Harmony Silver Award for his contributions to society. The Ramon Magsaysay Award Foundation (RMAF) announced Deep among others as winner of a 2009 Magsaysay award. On the eve of Republic Day (26 January 2010), he was honoured with the prestigious Padma Shri award by the Government of India.

He was chosen as the Chairman of the Institute of Rural Management Anand (IRMA) in October 2012, succeeding Dr. Yoginder K Alagh.

== Quotes ==
- "Civil society needs to have both head and heart. If all you have is bleeding hearts, it wouldn't work. If you only have heads, then you are going to dictate solutions which do not touch the human chord."
