= Ladakhi cinema =

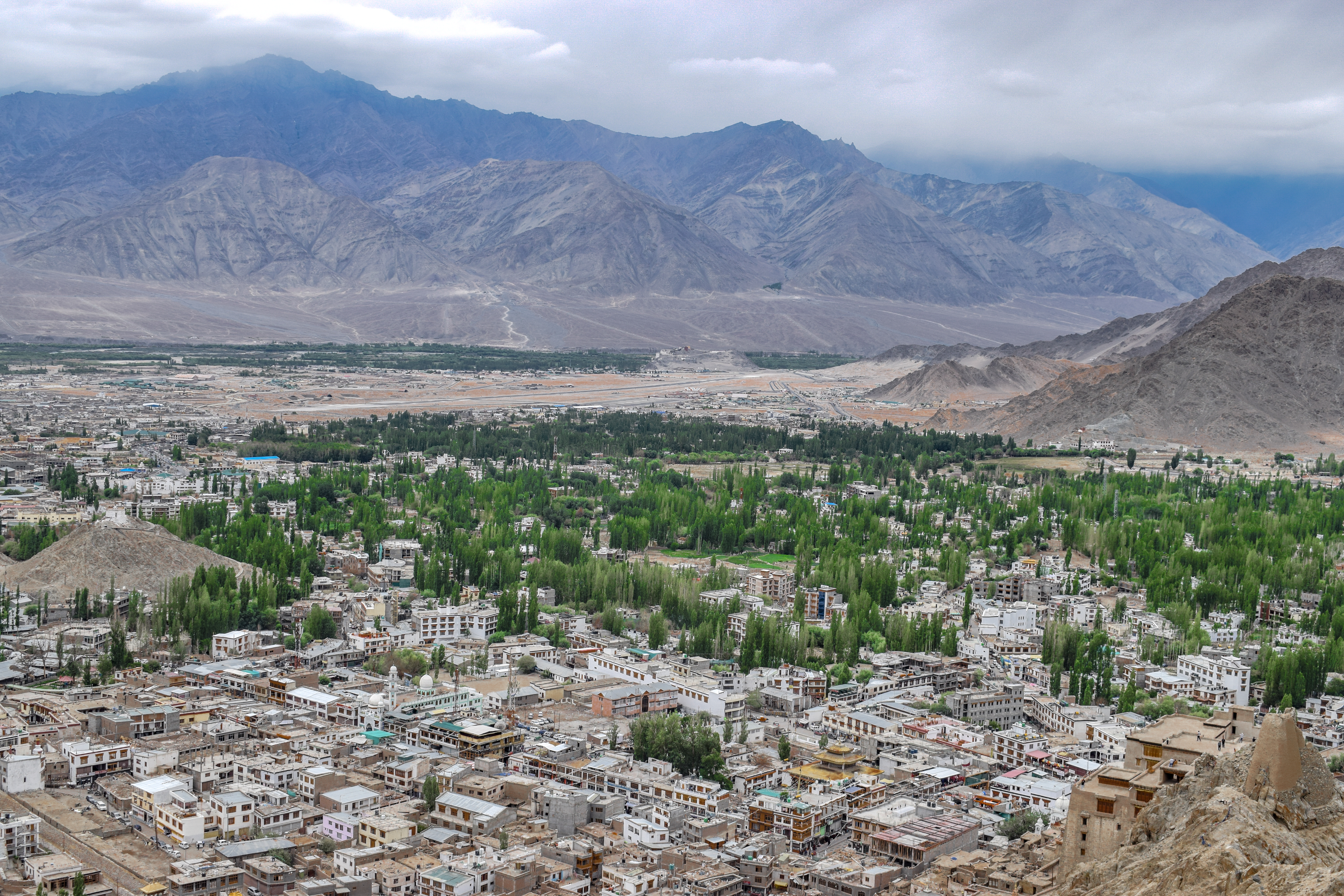
Overlook of Leh, the main city of Ladakh and namesake of Lehliwood.

Ladakhi cinema, sometimes called Lehliwood, refers to the Ladakhi-language film industry, often based in Leh, Ladakh in Indian-administered Kashmir, including local and international productions, many of Indian-origin.

== History ==
For most of modern history, Leh had only one film auditorium, and Ladakhis experienced local cinema through traveling film projectionists using LCD projectors and portable speakers. Owing to the remoteness and geography of Ladakh, many international productions have filmed only part of their projects in Ladakh, including the American films Seven Years in Tibet (1997) and Samsara (2011), often to capture Tibetan-style culture. Much of the Japanese-Canadian two-part documentary The Tibetan Book of the Dead: A Way of Life (1994) was filmed in Ladakh, following Ladakhi Buddhist monks and yogis.

In 2002, Ladakhis began making their own films for local audiences. The breakthrough film was Tsesems (2002), which helped establish the local film industry. By 2009, 26 Ladakhi films had been made, and Ladakh Vision Group had emerged as a foundational production company. Many Ladakhi films are inspired by the Bollywood cinema introduced to the region due to Hindi tourism and its hits largely include family dramas or romances. Shabani Hassanwalia and Samreen Farooqui directed the documentary Out of Thin Air (2010) about the advent of filmmaking in Ladakh, with Farooqui noting how Ladakhi movies end up with plenty of "repeat audiences" and turning a decent profit due to their modest budgets.

Ladakhi filmmaker Stenzin Tankyong made the short films Sekool and Last Days of Summer. His coming-of-age drama Kakthet, translated as Idiot, won a top prize at the Waves Film Bazaar and received backing for an Indian-French co-production.

== Indian-origin films ==
Several Indian and international films have been shot in Ladakh. Larger-budget productions filmed in the region include Hindi-language films such as 3 Idiots (2009) and Laal Singh Chaddha (2022).

The international co-production Samsara (2001), directed by Pan Nalin, follows a Ladakhi monk and was filmed in Ladakh. The film won awards at the Santa Barbara International Film Festival and was acquired by Miramax. Smaller-budget Indian films shot in Ladakh include Frozen (2007), which received an award at the 55th National Film Awards, and Walking with the Wind (2017), directed by Praveen Morchhale.

== Film festivals ==
The Himalayan Film Festival was launched in Leh in 2021 by the Union Territory administration. The festival aims to connect filmmakers and develop the region's film community.
