= Frozen (2007 film) =

2007 black-and-white Indian drama film

- Directed by: Shivajee Chandrabhushan
- Written by: Shanker Raman (screenplay); Shivajee Chandrabhushan (story)
- Produced by: Shivajee Chandrabhushan
- Starring: Danny Denzongpa; Gauri; Rajendranath Zutshi; Aamir Bashir
- Cinematography: Shanker Raman
- Edited by: Shan Mohammed
- Music by: John P. Varkey
- Release date: July 2007
- Running time: 109 minutes
- Country: India
- Language: Hindi

Frozen is a 2007 black-and-white Indian drama film directed by Shivajee Chandrabhushan. The original screenplay written by Shanker Raman, based on a story by Chandrabhushan and starring Danny Denzongpa, Gauri, and Skalzang Angchuk. The film was shot entirely on location at Ladakh, India.

It was featured at the various international film festivals, including the 2007 London Film Festival and Dubai International Film Festival, and was the official selection at 2007 Toronto International Film Festival and 2008 San Francisco International Film Festival, and Palm Springs International Film Festival.

At the 55th National Film Awards, it was awarded the Indira Gandhi Award for Best Debut Film of a Director and Best Cinematography.

== Plot ==
The film is a sombre journey of imaginative and impulsive teenager, Lasya (Gauri), who lives with her father Karma (Danny), an apricot jam-maker and younger brother Chomo (Angchuk) in a remote village in the Himalayas. Pristine snow-capped mountains surround their tiny hamlet and barren harsh land stretches for miles into nowhere. One day the army moves in, settles a hundred yards across their doorstep. The last bit of comfort the family draws from their familiar surroundings changes into a harsh, ceaseless, irreversible conflict. The film depicts the life of this family whose dreamlike existence is interrupted by insurmountable odds, one after the other.

== Cast ==
- Danny Denzongpa as Karma
- Gauri Kulkarni as Lasya
- Skalzang Angchuk Gultuk as Chomo
- Shakeel Khan as Romeo
- Raj Zutshi as Dawa
- Yashpal Sharma as Sharma
- Aamir Bashir as Commanding Officer
- Denzil Smith as Tenzing
- Sanjay Swaraj as Salim
- Anuradha Baral as Sita
- Sonam Stobgias Gorky as Rinpoche
- Shilpa Shukla as Karma's Wife
- Wangchuk Dorjey Mogul as Officer Wangchuk
- Stanzin Jordan as Vicky
- Manish Mathur as Performing Artiste

== Production ==
The film was shot in Ladakh, then part of Jammu and Kashmir, India, in February 2006, over 34 days at an average height of 15,000 ft above sea level. The film was shot in colour and was digitally intermediated to black and white. The house where the film was picturised was built at Stakmo, behind Thiksey Monastery.

== Reception ==
A review by Dennis Harvey of Variety, said that film's director's "background as a photographer and mountaineer, -- is evident in every frame of directorial debut "Frozen.".

Though the film had been going through Film Festival circuit since 2007 when the film was ready, its commercial release however happened in May 2009, during the stand off between producers and multiplexes, which resulted in number of films coming out of cold storage.

== Awards and nominations ==
The film has won (or been nominated for) the following awards:

Won

- National Film Awards
  - Indira Gandhi Award for Best Debut Film of a Director - Shivajee Chandrabhushan
  - National Film Award for Best Cinematography - Shanker Raman
- Durban International Film Festival - Best Cinematography - Shanker Raman
- Osian-Cinefan Film Festival, Delhi - Special Jury Award

Nominated

- International Thessaloniki Film Festival - Golden Alexander (Best Film) - Shivajee Chandrabhushan
- Asian Film Award for Best Cinematographer - Shanker Raman

== See also ==
- Ladakhi cinema
