= Praveen Morchhale =

Indian screenwriter and film director

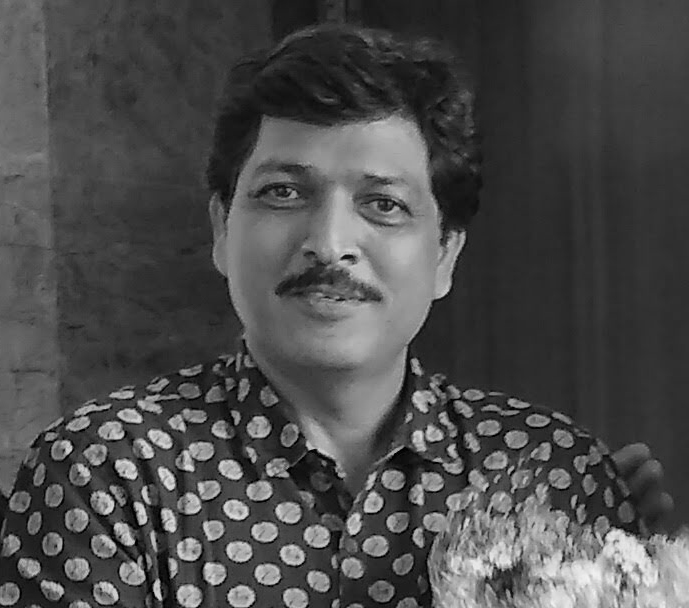
- Born: Narmadapuram, Madhya Pradesh, India
- Education: Institute of Rural Management Anand
- Occupations: Film director, screenwriter, producer
- Years active: 2013–present
- Awards: National Film Award 2018 UNESCO-Gandhi Medal 2018 INALCO Jury Award 2023 Paris

Praveen Morchhale is the winner of India's 65th National Film Awards 2017 as well as ICFT-UNESCO GANDHI Medal 2018 and INALCO Jury Award 2023 Paris winner film director, producer and screenwriter, who works in Indian cinema. Morchhale is hailed by critics as an important filmmaker of the Indian new wave.

== Films ==
Praveen Morchhale directed his first feature film Barefoot to Goa in 2015. Having started out by making short films and directing theatre, this film turned to crowdfunding prior to its release on 10 April 2015. Co-produced by 238 people who raised a sum of INR 5 million, this film depicted the indulgent relationship between a grandparent and a grandchild.

His next feature Walking with the Wind (2017), bagged three prizes at the 65th National Film Awards - Best Film (Ladakhi), Best Sound Design (Sanal George) and Best Re-Recording (Justin Jose). This film was also awarded the ICFT UNESCO Gandhi medal at the 49th International Film Festival of India.

Morchhale's third film, Widow of Silence (2018) is about a Kashmiri woman, Aasiya, whose husband gets picked up by the security forces. After waiting for seven years she is now a 'half-widow', a woman whose husband is missing, facing a government which is unwilling to declare him dead. This Urdu language feature Widow of Silence was premiered at the 23rd Busan International Film Festival where it was nominated for the Kim Jiseok Award for Best Asian Director. Film later was screened at more than 35 prestigious film festivals around the world such as International Film Festival Rotterdam 2019, Gothenburg Film Festival 2019, Seattle International Film Festival 2019, and Jerusalem Film Festival 2019.

Film won 5 International awards and considered as the most important film coming out from India in the year 2019. Film won Best film award at MOOOV Film Fest, 2019 Belgium (Winner Best film award in International competition and Behind the Scene Award).

At the 17th annual Indian Film Festival of Los Angeles, Widow of Silence won the Grand Jury prize for the best feature, for its depiction of "a condition that most of the world doesn't get to see".

Morchhale's fifth film, White Snow (Urdu) (2025) premiered at 49th São Paulo International Film Festival (Brazil). The film also received nominations to the International Film Festival of India- IFFI ICFT UNESCO Gandhi Medal (Goa) Competition, Kolkata International Film Festival, Kolkata, India, 2025, and the Jogja-NETPAC Asian Film Festival, Indonesia.

== Critical response ==
Praveen's all films have received critical response from all over the world. Widow of Silence has received positive reviews from critics and audiences alike. The New York Times wrote that "Widow of Silence is a movie with a cool head and a sharp eye — one that sees greater hope in the flamboyantly jeweled tones of a carmine head scarf than in the entrenched absurdities of a broken bureaucracy. The Hollywood Reporter wrote that the least compromised by sentimentality, it packs an unsettling message of empowerment very rare in the social injustice genre. Roger Ebert.com has a highly praise for the film - "The final four minutes turn what was already a fine picture into an unforgettable one, affirming Morchhale's status as one of the most exciting figures of the Indian new wave." Devarshi Ghosh wrote on Scroll.in that "Hope is a running theme in Morchhale's films". According to her, "In Widow of Silence, Aasiya's hope leads to a jarring poetic justice. “The end signifies not just the end of the villain but also of the system”".

Reviewing the film for the Asian Movie Pulse (AMP), Joanna KOŃCZAK noted that "Morchhale has undoubtedly brought up important issues and gave the voice to the people of the Valley, dwelling on their suffering and sorrows without a preachy tone and exaggerated melodrama. It is very rare for Indian filmmakers to take on the Kashmiri case in such an emphatic and problem-focused manner."

Belgian distributor MOOOV has picked up Benelux rights from Oration Films to Praveen Morchhale's Kashmir-set Widow Of Silence. The deal for all rights excluding airlines marks the first for the film.

== Inspiration ==
Morchhale has been noted for his subtle, natural and simplistic style of cinema and he mostly uses non-professional actors in his films. He takes his inspiration from Iranian Cinema, especially directors like Abbas Kiarostami whom he considers an "epitome of simple cinema...who uses the film medium to express stories in a minimalist way...without worrying too much about commercial aspects.".

== Filmography ==
=== As Director and Writer ===
Year	Title	Cast	Release	Festivals
2025	White Snow (Urdu)	Madhu Khandari (Fatima), Bhavya Khurana (Ameer), Noor (Fatima), Khacho Ahmad Khan (Priest)	2025	Premiered at 49th São Paulo International Film Festival (Brazil). International Film Festival of India- IFFI ICFT UNESCO Gandhi Medal (Goa) Competition.Kolkata International Film Festival, Kolkata, India, 2025. Jogja-NETPAC Asian Film Festival, Indonesia. Moscow International Film Festival, Russia. London Indian Film Festival, UK. Praveen Morchhale won BEST DIRECTOR award at Indo-German Film Week, Berlin, 2026.
2023	Behind Veils	Ariana (NRI Girl), Seema Biswas (Grandmother), Bhagwan Tiwari (Local Politician), Ajay Chourey (Barar)	14 April 2023	Premiered at International Film Festival of Asian Cinema, Vesoul France 2023
2018	Widow of Silence	Ajay Chourey (Officer), Shilpi Marwaha (Aasiya), Bilal Ahmad (Driver), Noorjahan (Inaya)	15 October 2018	International Film Festival Rotterdam 2019. Kolkata International Film Festival 2018. Hamburg Film Festival 2019. Kerala International Film Festival 2018. MOOOV Film Fest Belgium 2019. (Winner Best film award International competition and Behind the Scene Award). Los Angeles Indian Film Festival 2019, Goteborg Film Festival 2019. International Film Festival of Asian Cinema Vesoul 2019, (International Competition) International Film Festival of Kerala 2018. (International Competition) Kolkata International Film Festival 2018. (Winner Best Film - Indian Film Competition). Cinequest San Jose, USA 2019. Seattle International Film Festival USA 2019. Fajr International Film Festival IRAN 2019. (International Competition) Jerusalem International Film Festival Israel 2019. (International Competition). Taipei Film Festival 2019. Hamburg Film Festival 2019. (International Competition). Bangalore International Film Festival 2019. IFFLA Los Angeles 2019. (Winner Best film award in Competition) London Indian Film Festival 2019. Birmingham Indian Film Festival 2019. South Asian Film Festival Up North Manchester 2019. Indian Film Festival of Melbourne 2019. São Paulo International Film Festival Brazil 2019.
2017	Walking with the Wind	Ajay Chourey (Biker), Rigzin Dolkar (Mother), Phuntsog Dolma (Daughter), Sachi Joko (Japanese Documentary Maker), Phunchok Toldan (Father), Sonam Wangyal (Boy)	12 October 2017	Winner of three National Awards - Best Film (Ladakhi), Best Sound Design (Sanal George) and Best Re-Recording (Justin Jose). New Directors' Competition Sao Paulo International Film Festival2017. Debuts Directors' Competition Camerimage (International Film Festival of The Art of Cinematography). Poland. Nov 2017. Mumbai Film Festival 2017. Winner at Tertio Millennio Film Festival, Rome 2017. International Competition Fribourg International Film Festival Switzerland 2018.
2015	Barefoot to Goa	Prakhar Morchhale, Saara nahar, Sonu Chourasia, Ajay Chourey, Farrukh Jaffar (Grandmother)	10 April 2015	Indian Film Festival of Melbourne Australia 2015. Mumbai Film Festival 2015. Chennai International Film Festival Indian Panorama 2015. Peloponnesian International Film Festival Greece - International Competition 2015. Bengaluru International Film Festival Indian Cinema Competition 2015. International Children Film Festival Bangalore - International Competition 2015. Columbian International Film Festival Bogota 2015, Indian Film Festival The Hague 2015. Indian Film Festival Montreal Canada 2015. CIFF Kolkata 2015

=== As producer ===
Year	Title	Language
2023	Behind Veils	Hindi
2018	Widow of Silence	Urdu
2017	Walking with the Wind	Ladakhi
2015	Barefoot to Goa	Hindi

== Awards and nominations ==
Year	Award	Film	Result
2025	Sao Paulo International Film Festival for World Perspective	White Snow	Nominated
2025	JOGJA-NETPAC Asian Film Festival for Asian Perspective	White Snow	Nominated
2025	ICFT-UNESCO Gandhi Award International Film Festival of India	White Snow	Nominated
2026	Bangalore International Film Festival for Best Indian Cinema	White Snow	Nominated
2026	Kolkata International Film Festival for Best Indian Cinema	White Snow	Nominated
2023	INALCO JURY Award at International Film Festival of Asian Cinema Vesoul, France for Best Film	Behind Veils (Hindi - Sir Madam Sarpanch)	Won
2017	National Film Award for Best Film in Regional Language	Walking with the Wind	Won
2018	Kim Jiseok Award at Busan International Film Festival	Widow of Silence	Nominated
2017	Best Debut Director at Camerimage Polland	Walking With The Wind	Nominated
2018	Grand Prix at Fribourg International Film Festival Switzerland	Walking With The Wind	Nominated
2018	ICFT-UNESCO gandhi Award International Film Festival of India	Walking With The Wind	Won
2018	Bangalore International Film Festival	Widow of Silence	Nominated
2019	Fajr International Film Festival	Widow of Silence	Nominated
2019	Hamburg Film Festival	Widow of Silence	Nominated
2019	Indian Film Festival of Los Angeles	Widow of Silence	Won
2019	Jerusalem Film Festival	Widow of Silence	Nominated
2018	Kerala International Film Festival	Widow of Silence	Nominated
2018	Kolkata International Film Festival	Widow of Silence	Won
2019	London Indian Film Festival	Widow of Silence	Nominated
2019	Indian Film Festival of Los Angeles	Widow of Silence	Won
2019	MOOOV Film Festival	Widow of Silence	Won
2019	Pune International Film Festival	Widow of Silence	Nominated
2019	Rotterdam International Film Festival	Widow of Silence	Nominated
2015	Mumbai Film Festival	Barefoot to Goa	Nominated
