= White Snow (2025 film) =

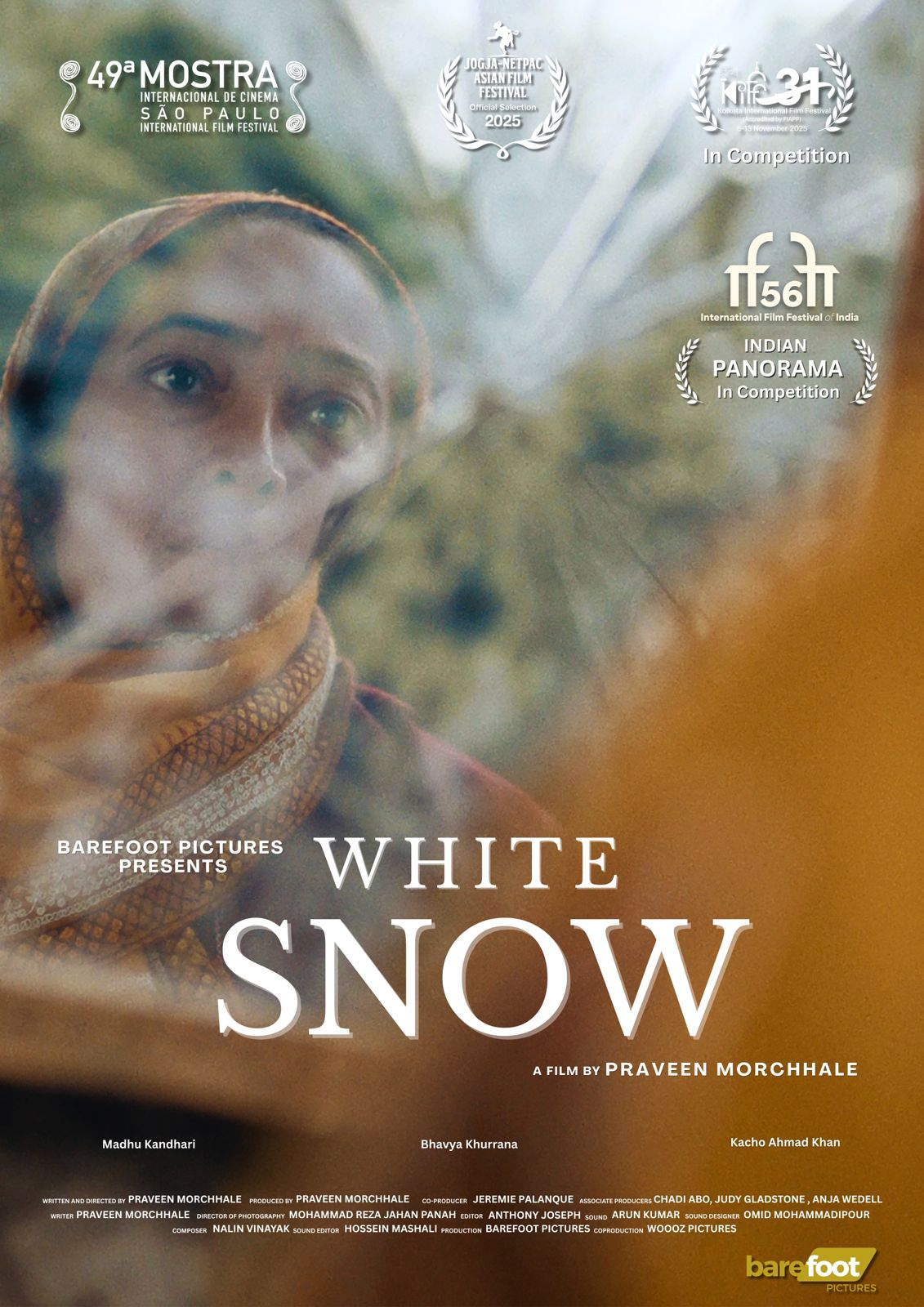
- Film poster
- Directed by: Praveen Morchhale
- Written by: Praveen Morchhale
- Produced by: Barefoot Pictures, India
- Starring: Madhu Khandari; Bhavya Khurana; Kaneez Fatima; Khacho Ahmad Khan
- Cinematography: Mohammad Reza Jahanpanah
- Edited by: Anthony Joseph
- Music by: Nalin Vinayak
- Release date: 9 December 2025
- Running time: 81 minutes
- Country: India
- Language: Urdu

White Snow' is an Indian drama film directed and written Praveen Morchhale. The film is an Urdu-language independent drama film starring Madhu Khandari and Bhavya Khurana in lead roles. The film is an Indo-French co-production by Barefoot Pictures, India, and Woooz Pictures, France. This is Praveen Morchhale's fifth feature film, and is based on a real life incident.

This film premiered in 2025 at the 49th São Paulo International Film Festival (Brazil). It has also received nominations at the 56th International Film Festival of India (Goa) in its IFFI ICFT UNESCO Gandhi Medal competition; the Jogja-NETPAC Asian Film Festival, Indonesia, the Kolkata International Film Festival (Indian Competition), and the 18th Habitat Film Festival (15-24 May 2026), New Delhi, for Pan-Indian Award Winning and Critically Acclaimed Films from 2025-26.

== Plot ==
“White Snow” centers on Fatima, whose filmmaker son Amir sees his work banned after its first community screening following complaints from religious authorities. The film’s transgression: depicting post-partum blood after childbirth. When Amir is arrested on charges of attempting to create social unrest, Fatima embarks on a perilous journey with an old cathode-ray tube television and DVD player loaded onto a yak, determined to screen the film in remote villages.

== Cast ==
- Madhu Khandari as Fatima
- Bhavya Khurana as Ameer
- Khacho Ahmad Khan as the priest

== Critical response ==
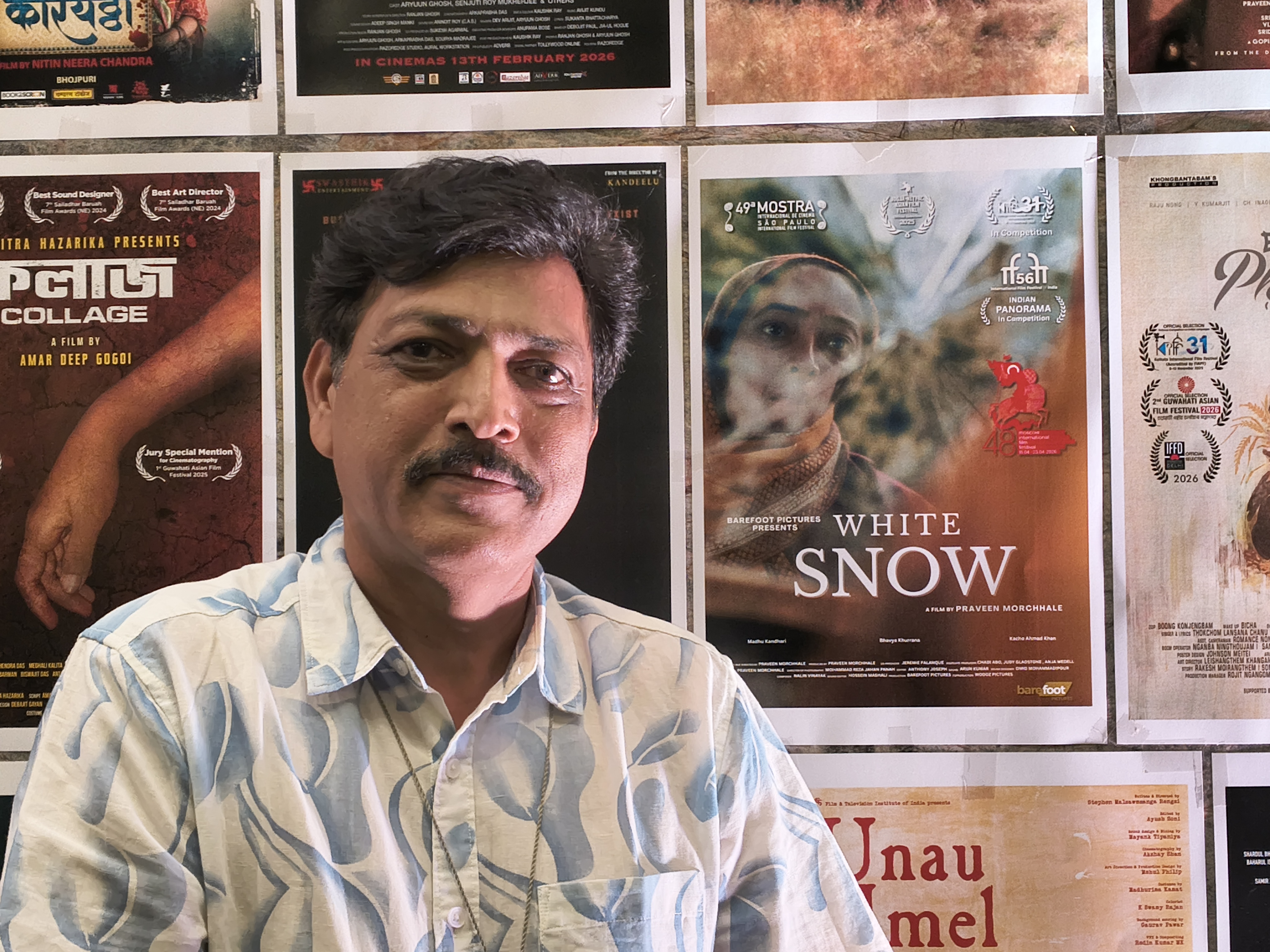
Director Morchhale at the 18th Habitat Film Festival, New Delhi (2026)

Widow of Silence has received positive reviews from critics and audiences alike.

Variety (magazine) wrote that “White Snow,” is filmmaker Praveen Morchhale's “artistic revolt” against political systems that repress artists.

Elizabeth Kerr wrote on Screen International that "White Snow" is a "Deceptively powerful Kashmiri drama celebrates freedom of expression". She also noted that it has "Just the right balance of resignation and rage".

The Asian Movie Pulse noted that while Praveen Morchhale has always been political in his works, with "White Snow", he takes a step further, directly commenting on the lack of freedom and the restrictions artists face today, in a pointed accusation that also unfolds as a road movie.

Film critic Dipankar Sarkar at UpperStall.com wrote that "Praveen Morchhale’s White Snow shows how art strains against invisible boundaries of authority, and offers an understated yet piercing critique of the personal costs of freedom of expression".
