= Vishal Narain =

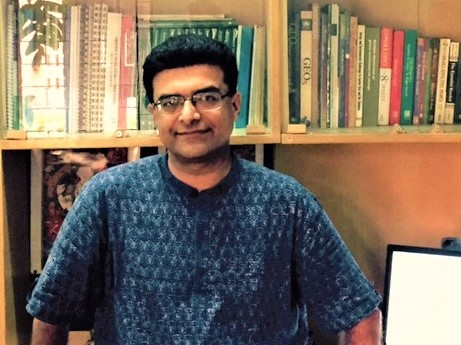
- Born: 1972 (age 53–54); New Delhi, India
- Citizenship: Indian
- Education: (PhD) Wageningen University and Research Centre, (Masters) Institute of Rural Management Anand and (Under Graduation) Shri Ram College of Commerce
- Occupations: Academician, Researcher
- Employer(s): Management Development Institute, Gurgaon
- Title: Dr
- Spouse: Shilpa Mathur
- Children: Son, Gautam
- Awards: SR Sen Prize for the best book on Agricultural Economics and Rural Development

Vishal Narain (born 1972) is an Indian, inter-disciplinary water researcher. His work cuts across the frontiers of the natural and social sciences, with a specific interest in institutions, governance and policy. He is currently a professor in the School of Public Policy and Governance at the Management Development Institute, Gurgaon.

== Early life and education ==
He started his schooling in New York City, United States, and later went on to study at Manav Sthali School in Delhi. He followed this up with a graduation in economics at Shri Ram College of Commerce, University of Delhi and a postgraduate diploma in rural management at IRMA, Institute of Rural Management, Anand, Gujarat. He earned a PhD from Wageningen University and Research Centre, Netherlands.

== Research work ==
His teaching and academic interests are in the inter-disciplinary analyses of public policy processes and institutions, water governance, gender, rights and equity analyses in water management, peri-urban issues and vulnerability and adaptation to environmental change. In particular he is interested in the relationship between technologies and institutions in water management, and how they are impacted by each other. He explores these issues using qualitative research tools with a strong reliance on ethnography. Lately he has been working extensively on peri-urban issues, especially in the context of vulnerability and adaptation to environmental change and water insecurity. His research on these dynamics has been published in peer-reviewed journals like Geoforum, Land Use Policy, Environment and Urbanization, Water Policy and Water International. He has co-edited several books such as “Water Security in periurban South Asia: adapting to climate change and urbanization (Oxford University Press, 2016), “Indian Water Policy at the cross-roads: resources, technology and reforms (Springer, 2016)” and “Globalization of water governance in South Asia (Routledge: Taylor and Francis, 2014).” In 2018 he published a book, Public Policy A View from the South in light of his research experience of policy processes in India.

== Personal life ==
Narain comes from an academic family background. His mother taught economics in the University of Delhi for 41 years, and his father served Indian Airlines in various capacities throughout his career, retiring as a director at the headquarters in New Delhi. Narain has a thirteen-year-old son, Gautam. His wife, Shilpa, is a home-maker. Narain is fond of music, bird-watching and cooking. He is also a philatelist and often spends time with his collection.

== Professional career ==
Prior to joining MDI, he was assistant professor, Department of Policy Studies at TERI University. In his early career, he served TERI, The Energy and Resources Institute, New Delhi, as a research associate and fellow in their Policy Analysis Division. He was a lead author for the chapter on human vulnerability to environmental change for GEO (Global Environment Outlook)- 4, the flagship publication of UNEP, the United Nations Environment Programme. He has completed consultancy assignments for a wide variety of international organizations such as the Food and Agriculture Organization of the United Nations, Bangkok, The International Water Management Institute, IWMI, Colombo, The STEPS Center, University of Sussex, UK, The Asia Foundation, New Delhi and SaciWATERs, the South Asian Consortium for Inter-disciplinary Water Resources Studies, Secunderabad, India.

Narain has been engaged in developing curricula and delivering MDPs (Management Development Programmes) around water and gender equity. He has conducted short training programmes around public policy analysis and inter-disciplinary water resources research for such organisations as TERI University, New Delhi, GALVMed, Global Alliance for Livestock Veterinary Medicine, Edinburgh and SaciWATERs, the South Asian Consortium for Inter-Disciplinary Water Resources Studies, Secunderabad, India.

== Awards and honours ==
He received the SR Sen Prize for the best book on Agricultural Economics and Rural Development (2002–03) conferred by the Indian Society of Agricultural Economics for his book ‘’Institutions, technology and water control: water users associations and irrigation management reform in two large scale systems in India (Orient Longman, 2003).” He also received the award for excellence in research conferred by Management Development Institute (MDI), Gurgaon for the year 2016 and 2018.

== Bibliography ==
=== Articles ===
- Narain, Vishal (2009). "Growing city, shrinking hinterland: land acquisition, transition and conflict in peri-urban Gurgaon, India". Environment and Urbanization. 21 (2): 501–512. doi:10.1177/0956247809339660.
- Narain, Vishal; Nischal, Shilpa (April 2007). "The peri-urban interface in Shahpur Khurd and Karnera, India". Environment and Urbanization. 19 (1): 261–273. doi:10.1177/0956247807076905.
- Narain, Vishal (Dec 2000). "India's water crisis: the challenges of governance". Water Policy. 2 (6): 433–444. doi:10.1016/S1366-7017(00)00018-0.
- Narain, Vishal (June 1998). "Towards a new groundwater institution for India". Water Policy. 1 (3): 357–365. doi:10.1016/S1366-7017(98)00029-4.

=== Books ===
- Narain, Vishal (2016), "Introduction: Towards a Discursive Analysis of Indian Water Policy", in Narain, Vishal; Narayanamoorthy, Annasamy (eds.), Indian Water Policy at the Crossroads: Resources, Technology and Reforms, Springer, ISBN 978-3-319-25184-4.
- Narain, Vishal (2016), "Introduction: urbanization, Climate Change, and Peri-urban Water Security in South Asia - A framework for Analysis", in Narain, Vishal; Prakash, Anjal (eds.), WATER SECURITY in PERI-URBAN SOUTH ASIA, India: Oxford University Press, ISBN 978-0-19-946416-6.
- Narain, Vishal (2003). Institutions, Technology and Water Control. India: Orient Longman. ISBN 81-250-2498-0.
- Narain, Vishal (2014), "Urbanization and water: A conundrum and source of conflict?", in Narain, Vishal; Goodrich, Chanda Gurung; Chourey, Jayati; Prakash, Anjal (eds.), Globalization of Water governance in South Asia, India: Routledge, ISBN 978-0-415-71066-4.
- Narain, Vishal (2018). Public Policy A View from the South. Cambridge, UK: Cambridge University Press. ISBN 978-1-108-42958-0.
