= Saurabh Dube =

Indian scholar (born 1960)

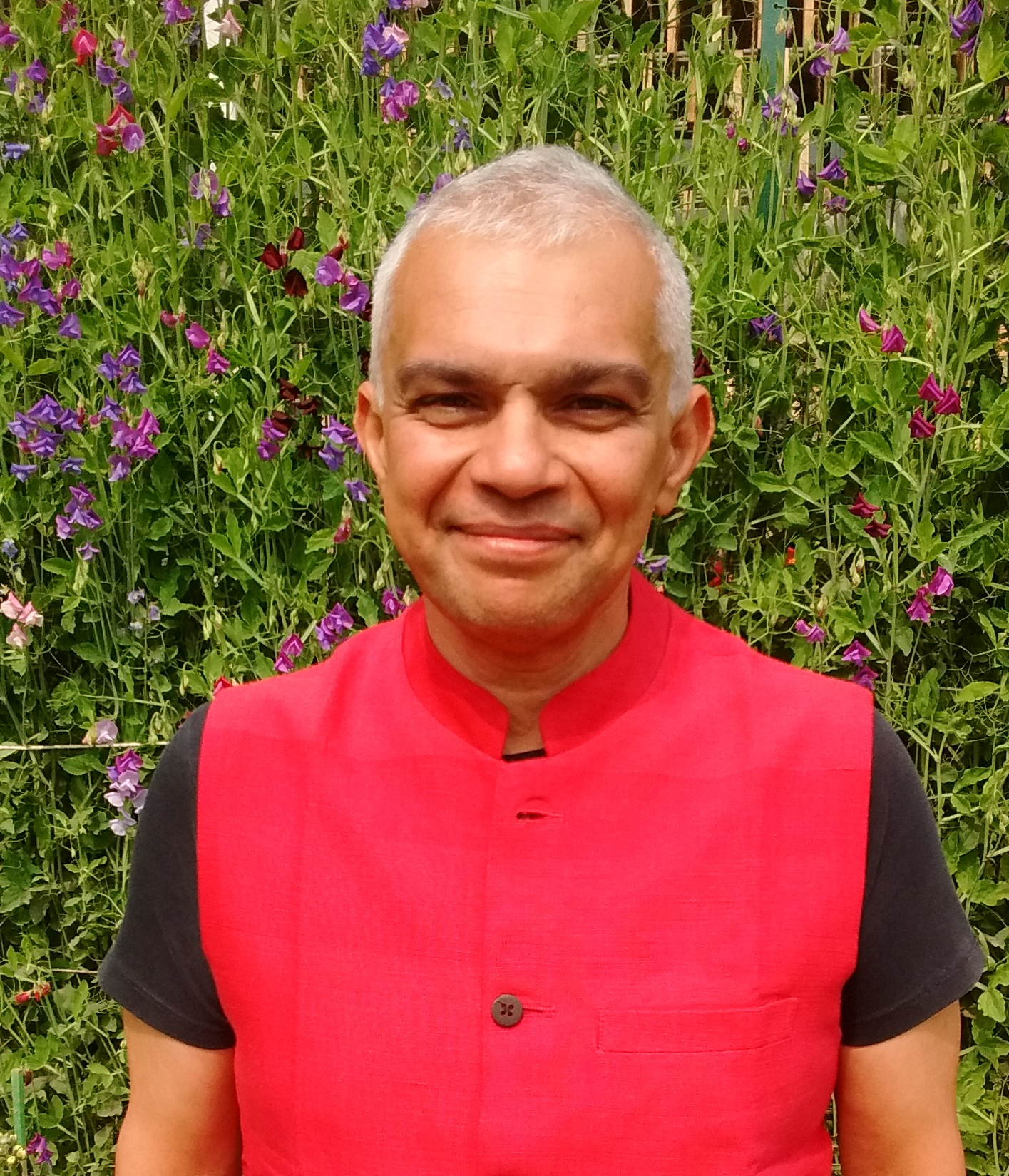
- Born: 18 December 1960 (age 65); Delhi, India
- Education: University of Delhi; University of Cambridge
- Scientific career
- Fields: History, anthropology
- Workplaces: El Colegio de México

Saurabh Dube is an Indian scholar whose work combines history and anthropology, archival and field research, subaltern studies and postcolonial-decolonial perspectives, and social theory and critical thought. After teaching at the University of Delhi, since 1995 he is Professor of History – elected to the Distinguished Category of Professor-Researcher in 2009 – at the Centre of Asian and African Studies at El Colegio de México in Mexico City. Dube is a member also of the National System of Researchers (SNI), Mexico, in which since 2005 he holds the highest rank.

Saurabh Dube has been described recently as "one of the most generative, creative, and surprising thinkers of our time" (Sunil Amrith) as well as "a thinker who in these times is fundamental to the Global South" (Mario Rufer). He has been considered as having "long been one of the most interesting and perceptive scholars addressing the dilemmas of modernity in South Asia"; as issuing "excellent reminder[s] of the possibilities as well as the perils of modernity" at large; and as "bringing an electric urgency to the task of historiography of modernity", encompassing "the genealogies of the modern in Europe, the Americas, and South Asia".

== Biographical ==
Dube was born to anthropologist parents, S.C. Dube and Leela Dube. He received the BA (Honours) and MA degrees in History from St. Stephen’s College, Delhi; an MPhil (1988) from the University of Delhi; and a PhD (1992) from the University of Cambridge. Dube has held visiting professorships several times at institutions such as Cornell University, the University of Iowa, and the Johns Hopkins University. He has been elected fellow of the John Simon Guggenheim Memorial Foundation, New York; the Indian Institute of Advanced Study, Shimla; the Institute of Advanced Study, University of Warwick; the Stellenbosch Institute of Advanced Study, South Africa; the Max Weber Kolleg, Erfurt, Germany; and the Institute of the Human Sciences (IWM), Vienna, Austria. Dube is an inaugural Distinguished Research Fellow (2023-2027) of the Max Weber Forum for South Asian Studies, part of the Max Weber Stiftung, Germany. He is married to fellow cultural historian, Ishita Banerjee. Both Dube and Ishita Banerjee were elected to the prestigious D.D. Kosambi [Visiting] Research Professorship in Interdisciplinary Studies (2017-2019) of Goa University in India, a Chair previously held by Romila Thapar, Sudhir Kakar, Madhav Gadgil, and Shahid Amin.

== Contribution and critique ==
Saurabh Dube has been appreciated for setting up conversations between scholarship on South Asia and Latin America, combining "sociology, history, anthropology, and postcolonial studies to present a nuanced analysis of the challenges confronting our contemporary understandings of empire and modernity, power and difference, and nation and history". His work has been read as well for "its lyrical tenor, conversational approach and inspired indecision between the archive and the field. …an irresistible feast for the historical imagination …that is visibly kind to theoretical abstractions", while it closely addresses details, especially of the Chhattisgarh region.

It has been argued that while offering broad "conceptual reflection on, and an extended dialogue with, the vast critical scholarship on modernity that the fields of postcolonial theory, history, and anthropology have yielded …Dube builds on this corpus of writings and further probes them", making an especially "original contribution" through his "deliberations on the productions of time and space by various subjects". In these ways, Dube's writing questions "the dominant models that variously encode modernity as a splitting of the past from the present, as a developmental surpassing of the past, or as the preserve of an exclusive West that narrates the contours of universal history …[and thereby it] also destabilizes prevalent images of traditional spaces that are merely waiting to subsumed into modern history". Commenting on the urgency of this scholarship, it has been suggested that the thought and writing are "disguised as a thesis. But Dube has obviously penned a manifesto …a call for action …a benchmark by which we look at the future investigators of modernity and their ethical and privileged responsibilities for naming and changing the scripts that bind the subject of modernity".

Saurabh Dube’s most recent single-authored book, Disciplines of Modernity has been described as "an original and compelling exploration" (Craig Calhoun), "a tour de force weaving personal itineraries with public life ...[a] moving and insightful book [which] cuts to the heart of the hierarchies that continue to shape the global production of knowledge" (Sunil Amrith). It has also been called "a unique, thought-provoking, and challenging ...intervention in the fields of social sciences and humanities speaking across disciplines and archives", a work that "takes us forward from the moment of postcolonial and decolonial critique and recasts the framework within which scholars of/from the global south and the global north may henceforth converse" (Prathama Banerjee). Finally, Disciplines of Modernity has been described as "an innovative and inviting, powerful and provocative book" ..."conjoining intimacy and affect with structure and process [where] predilections of the postcolonial are interwoven with the contradictions of modernity, the contentions of disciplines are bound to ambiguities of the archive, and accumulation and development are crisscrossed by loss and excess" (Mario Rufer).

In a related manner, Dube's Subjects of Modernity was heralded as "ranging widely and globally – from histories of empires and genealogies of disciplines to recent Dalit artwork from India – to explore and carefully delineate a tension he regards as fundamental to the formation of the modern: the modern subject's inevitable entanglement with those subject to modernity. A tour de force, this book offers a critical, timely and powerful sequel to postcolonial and subaltern studies" (Dipesh Chakrabarty). The work has also been appreciated as modelling "a form of critical scholarship that is generous in its engagement with the work of its interlocutors even as it pushes against the latest clichés to chart new directions" (Mrinalini Sinha); as elaborating "a meditation of unusual insight and critical value" concerning modernity and its subjects (Jean Comaroff and John Comaroff); and as articulating "a challenging break with frameworks that for too long have carried colonialism's intellectual heritage forward even after its political demise" (Michael Herzfeld).

Taken together, Dube's wide-ranging corpus has been characterized as bearing "an insistence on the difficult and uneasy exercise of interpreting without reifying, of arguing without creating sociological taxonomies, of historicizing while still reflecting on the process of 'history production' …the most astute warning and also the most impressive legacy of Saurabh Dube".

Others, however, have criticized Dube's writings for being far too theoretical, unmindful of disciplinary boundaries, and immensely broad in scope.

== Work ==
Dube’s research explores questions of colonialism and modernity, law and legalities, caste and community, evangelization and empire, and popular religion and subaltern art.

Apart from more than one hundred and thirty journal articles and book chapters as well as a few dozen reviews/discussion-pieces, his authored books in English include Untouchable Pasts (State University of New York Press, 1998; reprint Sage, 2001); Stitches on Time (Duke University Press and Oxford University Press, 2004); After Conversion (Yoda Press, 2009); Subjects of Modernity (Manchester University Press, 2017 [Hardback and Open Access] and 2019 [Paperback]; SUNMeDIA/STIAS, 2017 [South Africa]; Primus Books, 2018 [South Asia]); and Disciplines of Modernity (Routledge, 2022 [Hardback and E-pub]; 2023 [South Asia]; 2024 [Paperback]).

Dube has authored as well a quintet in historical anthropology in the Spanish language comprising Sujetos subalternos (2001), Genealogías del presente (2003), Historias esparcidas (2007), Modernidad e Historia (2011, second edition 2019), and Formaciones de lo contemporaneo (2017), published by El Colegio de México. A 600-page anthology of his writings in Spanish of the last twenty years, El archivo y el campo: Historia, antropología, modernidad was published in 2019 also by El Colegio de México.

Among Dube's more than fifteen edited and co-edited volumes are Postcolonial Passages (Oxford University Press, 2004); Historical Anthropology (Oxford University Press, 2007); Enchantments of Modernity (Routledge, 2009); Ancient to Modern (Oxford University Press, 2009); Modern Makeovers (Oxford University Press, 2011); Crime through Time (Oxford University Press, 2013); Unbecoming Modern (second edition, Routledge, 2019); and Dipesh Chakrabarty and the Global South (Routledge, 2020). Dube also currently edits the innovative international series "Routledge Focus on Modern Subjects" (London, New York, and New Delhi).
