= Leela Dube =

Indian anthropologist and feminist scholar

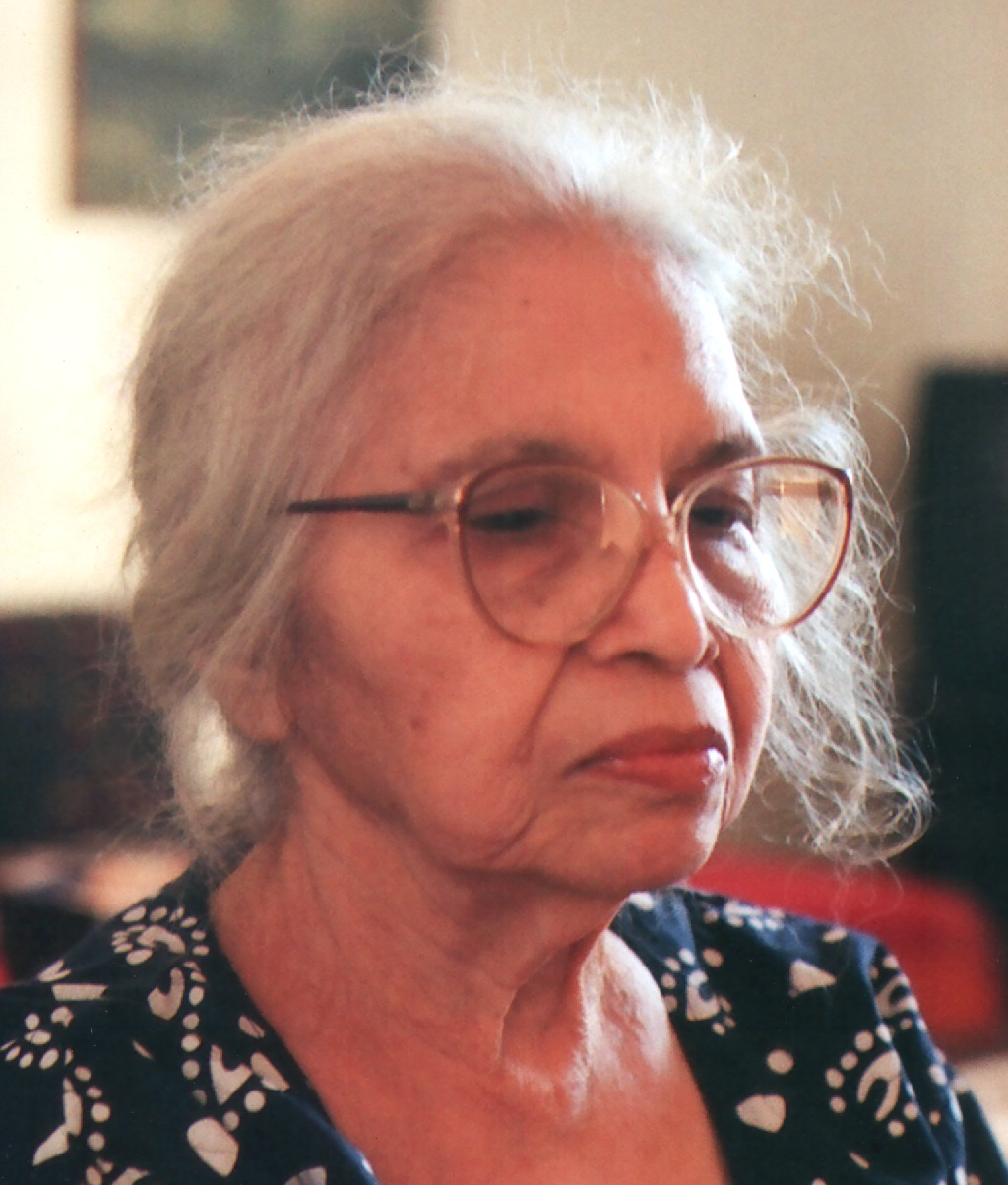
- Leela Dube – October 2006
- Born: 27 March 1923
- Died: 20 May 2012 (aged 89); Delhi, India

Leela Dube (27 March 1923 – 20 May 2012) was a renowned anthropologist and feminist scholar, fondly called Leeladee by many. She had been married to the renowned anthropologist and sociologist Late Shyama Charan Dube. Leela Dube was the younger sister of the late classical singer Sumati Mutatkar. Her elder son Late Mukul Dube was an avid photographer. She is survived by her younger son, Saurabh Dube. Known for her work on kinship and in women's studies, she wrote several books including Matriliny and Islam: religion and society in the Laccadives and Women and kinship: comparative perspectives on gender in South and South‑east Asia.

== Career ==
Although she had taught earlier at Osmania, Dube's academic career really began in 1960 at Sagar University, Madhya Pradesh. She moved to Delhi in 1975. She played a crucial role in shaping the "Towards Equality" report of the Committee on the Status of Women in India (1974), Government of India, discussion of which in the Parliament of India brought women's studies to centre stage in Indian academia via the UGC and the ICSSR.

She was a key person in the Indian Sociological Society in the 1970s and was responsible for introducing women's studies concerns into mainstream sociology. She was one of the pioneering and senior faculty in the Institute of Rural Management, Anand, when it started functioning in 1980. One of her studies in the then nascent educational organisation put it on the international map. In IRMA she pioneered a course for the first batch in 1980, termed then "Rural Environment"; a foundation course which attempted to push a "business management techniques program design" towards asking questions about village society. It was also designed as a preparatory course to the "village field work segment". This was an innovation for business schools which she pioneered from probably her own sociological field work experiences. This course has been developed further, and split; in 2012, it was offered as three half credit courses, termed "Rural Society and Polity", "Rural Livelihood Systems", and "Rural Research Methods". It continues to be offered as a first semester course, as a preparation for the field work that follows.

At the World Sociological Congress of 1984, women activists and women's studies scholars played a dominant role through Research Committee (RC) 32. Dube summed up the session with her comments on the tradition of son preference in India. In a debate in the Economic and Political Weekly in 1982–86 on sex selective abortions, her contribution was noteworthy and her prediction about the direct relationship between deficit of women and increased violence against women proved to be true in later years.

Due to the team effort of women's studies scholars (including Leela Dube), RC 32 was institutionalised in the World Sociological Congress. Dube invited many activists for the 12th International Congress of Anthropological and Ethnological Sciences, Zagreb, 24–31 July 1988, to present papers on "Codification of Customary Laws into Family Laws in Asia". In the Congress, Dube's speech on feminist anthropologist Eleanor Leacock provided new insights into the departure of feminist anthropologists from the colonial legacy of "Big Brother watching you". Power relations between the North and The South in the construction of knowledge and the hegemonic presence of the ETIC approach in academics were questioned by Leacock as well as by Dube, a proponent of the "dialogical approach" in anthropological and ethnographic research.

At different times, Leela Dube was associated with the Indian Council of Social Science Research and the Nehru Memorial Museum and Library. For short spells she was visiting faculty at several universities in different parts of the world.

In keeping with her expressed wish, her eyes were donated after her death.

== Books and articles ==
Visibility and Power: Essays on Women in Society and Development, co-edited by Leela Dube, Eleanor Leacock and Shirley Ardener and published by the Oxford University Press in 1986, provides an international perspective for the anthropology of women in the contexts of India, Iran, Malaysia, Brazil and Yugoslavia.

Her piece, "On the Construction of Gender: Hindu Girls in Patrilineal India", Economic and Political Weekly, Vol. 23, No. 18 (30 Apr. 1988), has been used by women's groups for study circles and training programmes.

A volume in the series on Women and the Household, Structures and Strategies: Women, Work, and Family (1990), co-edited by Leela Dube and Rajni Palriwala, has been useful in teaching women's studies in economics, sociology, geography, social work and governance courses.

Women and Kinship: Comparative Perspectives on Gender in South and South-East Asia, by Leela Dube, United Nations University Press (1997), argues that kinship systems provide an important context in which gender relations are located in the personal and public arenas.

Her celebrated book, Anthropological Explorations in Gender: Intersecting Fields, published in 2001 by Sage, is an important contribution in feminist anthropology in India. It examines gender, kinship and culture by sourcing a variety of unconventional materials such as folk tales, folk songs, proverbs, legends and myths to construct an ethnographic profile of feminist thought. She provides an understanding of the socialization of the girl child in the patriarchal family, with the "seed and soil" theory propagated by Hindu scriptures and epics symbolizing a domination-subordination power relationship between men and women.

Her last publication, a Marathi translation of her last book in English, was Manavashastratil Lingbhavachi Shodhamohim, which appeared in 2009.

== Awards ==
In 2009 she was given the UGC's Swami Pranavananda Saraswati Award for 2005.

In 2007 she received the Lifetime Achievement Award of the Indian Sociological Society.
