= Vijay Mahajan =

Indian social entrepreneur (born 1954)

Vijay Mahajan is the chief executive officer (CEO) of the Rajiv Gandhi Foundation and the director of the Rajiv Gandhi Institute of Contemporary Studies.

Mahajan was the founder of the BASIX Social Enterprise Group which is engaged in livelihood promotion and supported the livelihoods of over three million low income households in over 20 states in India and six developing countries.

Mahajan founded PRADAN, a well-known Indian non-government organization (NGO), in 1982, and worked at PRADAN till the end of 1990. He established VikaSoko Development Exchange in 1991 jointly with his Woodrow Wilson School/Princeton classmates, Thomas Fisher, a British citizen and Geoffey Onegi-Obel, an Ugandan citizen, worked on social enterprises in India and East Africa. They ran VikaSoko till 1996, when Vijay established the first three entities of what later became the BASIX Social Enterprise Group.

== Early life ==
Vijay Mahajan was born in India in October 1954. He attended the Indian Institute of Technology, Delhi in 1970 for a five-year bachelor's degree in technology, specialising in Electrical Engineering. He graduated from Indian Institute of Management, Ahmedabad in 1981, earning a master's degree in business management. In 1988, he went to the Woodrow Wilson School of Public and International Affairs, Princeton University, USA, as a Mid-Career Fellow for a year.

== Career ==
=== Philips ===
Vijay's first job was at the electronics multinational company Philips in a marketing position. He worked there for four years, travelling mostly in the small towns and rural parts of the Northeastern states, with headquarter in Guwahati for two years. Later he was moved to Kolkata and got exposed to the eastern Indian states of India – Bihar, Odisha, West Bengal for two years.

=== PRADAN ===
After his MBA from IIM Ahmedabad, inspired by Professors Ravi Matthai, Ranjit Gupta and Kamla Chowdhry, Vijay joined a Gandhian NGO, ASSEFA in Bihar in mid 1982, working to settle landless poor people on Bhoodan (gifted land) they had received. This involved projects of land and water development, starting agriculture and adding allied activities. After turning around the initial project in Gaya, he set up new projects in Jamui and Deoghar districts and then many more in other northern states.

Mahajan sought the help of ASSEFA staff to work on the idea of professionals working at the grassroots, assisting NGOs and poor communities in development action. This led to the birth of PRADAN or "professional assistance for development action". Pradan in Hindi means "to give in exchange" as against dan which means "to give in charity".

In October 1983, PRADAN was established as a non-profit society and was funded by the Ford Foundation. Vijay became its first executive director. Continuing his work with ASSEFA, Vijay inducted a number of young professionals from the IITs, IIMs and top agricultural universities to work with ASSEFA as well as other NGOs such as MYRADA, Seva Mandir, Anand Niketan Ashram, Mahila Jagaran Samiti and Gram Vikas, Orissa. By 1986, PRADAN began its own direct work with rural poor communities, starting with the tribals of the Kesla block in Hoshangabad district of Madhya pradesh to the dalit carcass flayers of Barabanki in Uttar Pradesh to the tasar silk reares of Santhal Parganas of Bihar (now Jharkhand). Vijay topped up this flush of innovative projects by setting up three separate types of collaborative projects – for wasteland development with small NGOs in Purulia, West Bengal; for income-generation with ITC near its cigarette factories in Munger, Bihar and Saharanpur, UP; and with the local panchayats and district/block level government agencies in the Kishangarh Bas block of Alwar district in Rajasthan.

In keeping with the leadership norms then prevalent in his alma mater IIMA, he stepped down from the executive directorship after serving a five-year term. Deep Joshi, who had joined PRADAN in 1986, took over as the second executive director of PRADAN. Vijay then went for a year's fellowship to the Princeton University. On his return, he worked in PRADAN for a year and a half. He spent the initial few months with Mr Laxmi Chand Jain and Smt Ela Bhatt, who were both senior development activists then serving as members of the Planning Commission of India.

=== VikaSoko ===
In 1992, Vijay was joined by Thomas Fisher, whom he had met in Princeton and along with whom and a third colleague, Geoffrey Onegi-Obel, and they together established a US registered non-profit NGO called VikaSoko (a word synthesised from Vikas meaning development in Hindi and Soko meaning marketplace in Swahili). They then offered services as development consultants and researchers and also as trainers, but with a focus exclusively on the issue of livelihoods.

Their first assignment was for the Dalai Lama's Tibetan Government-in-Exile in Dharamsala, whom they worked with to produce the first Integrated Development Plan for the 120,000 Tibetan community in exile. Subsequently, they carried out a study of the Rural Non-Farm Sector in India, for the Indian National Bank for Agriculture and Rural Development (NABARD) and the Swiss Agency for Development Cooperation (SDC). Another study was of the SEWA Bank for the Ford Foundation and a third one of financial services for the rural poor and women, for the World Bank.

=== BASIX ===
In 1996, realising the need to attract mainstream financial resources, Vijay conceptualised BASIX, a new generation institution devoted to promoting a large number of livelihoods for the poor and women on a sustainable basis. BASIX established Bhartiya Samruddhi Finance Ltd (BSFL), which was among the first microfinance companies in the world to attract commercial debt and equity investments, both internationally and from within India. It also offers a range of services including savings and insurance, agricultural, livestock and non-farm enterprise development, and institutional development to rural producers and their groups. Some of his early colleagues at BASIX were BL Parthasarathy, Ashok Singha, Sankar Datta, MS Sriram, and D Sattaiah.

== Institution and Sector Building Roles ==
In 1998, jointly with Ela Bhatt Vijay co-founded Sa-Dhan, the association of community development financial institutions in 1999 with Ela Bhatt of SEWA. He was the founding President of MicroFinance Institutions Network (MFIN) of India in 2009. In 2010 he was elected vice-chair of the Global Agenda Council on Social Entrepreneurship of the World Economic Forum (WEF), Davos, along with Prof Greg Dees as Chair. In 2012, Vijay was elected as chair of the board of the World Bank's Consulative Group to Assist the Poor (CGAP), Washington DC.

== Policy Advisory and Board Roles ==
Vijay was a member of the Committee on Financial Sector Reforms, chaired by Raghuram Rajan and also of the C. Rangarajan Committee on Financial Inclusion. Vijay served on the Insurance Regulatory and Development Authority, and the Micro Finance Development and Equity Fund. He is the Principal Advisor to the Government of Rajasthan on Livelihoods.

He served for several years on the Boards of various NGOs including Association for Sarva Seva Farms (ASSEFA), Gram Vikas, ARAVALI, Development Support Centre a. He also served on the boards of management institutions including the Indian Institute of Health Management Research, the Institute of Rural Management Anand and the Indian Institute of Forest Management.

Vijay has been an advisor to the Planning Commission, Government of India, the state governments of Andhra Pradesh, Karnataka, Madhya Pradesh, Rajasthan and Sikkim, and to RBI and NABARD. He was the Principal Advisor on Livelihoods to the Government of Rajasthan (2004-2010) and in that capacity helped conceptualise the Rajasthan Mission on Livelihoods, which later became the Rajasthan Skill and Livelihood Development Corporation in 2011.

Internationally, Vijay served on the board of Oxfam America from 1995 to 1998 and from 2006 to 2012 on the executive committee(ExCom) of the World Bank's Consultative Group to Assist the Poor (CGAP), a global consortium of 33 bilateral, multilateral and private donor organisations on microfinance . In his last two years he was elected the chair of the CGAP ExCom and in that capacity helped to move CGAP agenda from microfinance to financial inclusion. He was vice-chair, along with late Prof Greg Dees as chair, of the Global Agenda Council on Social Entrepreneurship, World Economic Forum, Davos, 2009–2010.

Apart from founding and serving till September 2016 on the boards of all the BASIX Group's social enterprises, Vijay served as an independent director on the boards of several social enterprises and financial inclusion enterprises, including as the promoter of the Krishna Bhima Samruddhi Local Area Bank Ltd (KBS Bank) and Sarvodaya Nano Finance Ltd. He was also on the investment committee of the Aavishkaar India Micro Venture Capital Fund in its first three years (2003–2006) and is on the investment committee of the Menterra Social Impact Fund.

== Positions and recognitions ==
Vijay has been listed in “60 Outstanding Social Entrepreneurs” by the Schwab Foundation for Social Entrepreneurship at the World Economic Forum, Davos, 2002; "India's 50 Most Powerful People" by BusinessWeek, 2009 and among "the twenty people who will reform India during this decade", by the Indian Express, 2011

Awards conferred on him include:

- Distinguished Alumnus Award by IIT Delhi, 2003
- Ashoka Fellowship, 2008
- HSBC Access award for outstanding contribution to the microfinance sector, 2009
- Skoch Foundation Award for Financial Inclusion, 2010
- Distinguished Alumnus Award by IIM Ahmedabad, 2011
- Prerna Samman I(Inspiration honour) at Sankalp Event, 2013
- Rockefeller Foundation Fellow at Bellagio Centre, 2016
- MFIN Award for outstanding contribution to the microfinance sector, 2018
- Edward W. Claugus Award for Financial Inclusion Leadership, 2019

== Publications ==
- "The Forgotten Sector: Non-farm Employment and Enterprises in Rural India” by Thomas Fisher (Author), Vijay Mahajan (Author)
- "Microfinance – from the fire to the frying pan?" by Mr. Vijay Mahajan (Author), Mr. Bikram Duggal (Contributor)
