= VFS Capital =

Indian non-banking financial company

VFS Capital Limited
- Company type: Financial Services
- Industry: Financial services
- Founded: 28 June 1994; 31 years ago
- Founders: Mr Kuldip Maity
- Headquarters: Village Financial Services, Eco space, Business Park, Tower-4 B, Room no. 403, 4th Floor, New Town, Rajarhat, Kolkata - 700160, West Bengal, India.
- Number of locations: 13 state, 78 districts, 20,900 Villages (2020)
- Key people: Mr Ajit Kumar Maity (Chairman); Mr Kuldip Maity (MD & CEO); Dr Sankar Datta (Independent Director); Ms Jayshree Vyas (Chartered Accountant); Dr T.K. Mukhopadhyay (Independent Director); Mr Pradipta Jena (Independent Director)
- Operating income: ▲₹212.58 crore (US$22 million) (2020)
- Net income: ▲₹35.06 crore (US$3.7 million) (2020)
- Total assets: ▲₹1,007.57 crore (US$110 million) (2020)
- Total equity: 161.05 Crore
- Number of employees: 1473 (2020)
- Website: www.vfscapital.in

VFS Capital Limited formerly known as Village Financial Services Ltd (VFS), is headquartered in Kolkata, was incorporated on 28 June 1994, as a private limited company before it got its present name. As of December, 2025 they have defaulted on all their financial obligations and staring at a bankruptcy.

The name Village Financial Services Private Limited (VFSPL) was registered by the Registrar of Companies on 23 January 2006. Subsequently, the Reserve Bank of India granted it a certificate of registration dated 1 December 2006. In 2013, VFSPL became the first microfinance institution (MFI) in eastern India to get the status of an NBFC-MFI or Non-Banking Financial Company-MFI from the RBI.

On 7 November 2017, the company was converted into a public company, after which the RBI granted it a fresh certificate of registration on 4 January 2018. VFS is also the first ISO-certified microfinance company in India. Microfinance operations under VFS have grown. Poor families are provided credit for income-generating activities and helped towards economic self-sufficiency, which is particularly helpful for women borrowers.

== History ==
In 1978, a group of young people got together to help flood victims of West Bengal. In 1982, that developed to Village Welfare Society (VWS) and was registered as a not-for-profit organization. VWS began microfinance activities in 1996 which led to the setting up of Village Micro Credit Services in 2004, a Section 25 not-for-profit company to undertake microfinance activities. The firm was renamed to Village Financial Services Limited, regulated by the RBI. It was reclassified by the RBI as an ‘NBFC-MFI’ on 27 September 2013.

The company was incorporated on 28 June 1994, in Kolkata, West Bengal, India, as a private limited company under the Companies Act, 1956, under a different name.

- In 2006-07, it acquired a non-banking financial company (NBFC) and became Village Financial Services Pvt Ltd.
- In 2013-14, the Reserve Bank of India reclassified VFSPL as an NBFC-MFI.
- In 2017-18, Village Financial Services Pvt Ltd became Village Financial Services Ltd and got its first private equity (PE) funding.
- In 2018-19, VFS saw its assets under management cross Rs 1,000 crore.

The company has been included in academic studies of micro finance.

== Board of directors ==
- Mr Ajit Kumar Maity is the chairman of Village Financial Services Ltd. He has worked in microfinance since 1995 after having started an NGO in 1978. He is the pioneer of microfinance in eastern India. He is also the founder-member of Sa-Dhan.
- Mr Kuldip Maity is the MD and CEO of Village Financial Services. He is associated with Sa-Dhan, AMFI West Bengal and Micro Finance Institutions Network (MFIN). He has been a dedicated social worker for over two decades. He has received numerous awards for his work.
- Dr Sankar Datta, a doctorate in economics, is an independent director of VFS. He has been working for more than three decades with the poor to improve their livelihoods by getting linked with various value chains and accessing microfinance.
- Ms Jayshree Vyas, a chartered accountant, is an independent director of VFS. She is the Managing Director of Shri Mahila Sewa Sahakari Bank Ltd and Promoter Director in Sewa Grih Rin Ltd, and a director in Equitas Holding Ltd, among others.
- Dr T.K. Mukhopadhyay is an independent director of VFS. He was earlier country head of IDBI Bank and has been on the board of North Eastern Development Financial Corporation (NEDFi).
- Mr Pradipta Jena, an independent director of VFS, is a former Regional Director of the Reserve Bank of India. He has handled general banking and foreign exchange, among others, and has a special interest in rural development and microcredit.

== Investors ==
- IDFC First Bank and Param Value Investments are the equity investors in Village Financial Services as on 31 March 2019.
- Param Value Investments invested in VFS in March 2018. Param Value Investments is a partnership firm owned by a high net-worth individual, Mr Mukul Mahavir Agarwal, and Param Capital Research Pvt Ltd. The firm invests both in public and private equity across sectors.
- Capital First Limited invested in VFS in July 2018. In December 2018, IDFC Bank Ltd merged with Capital First Ltd and renamed itself as IDFC First Bank Ltd.
- IDFC First Bank Ltd owns a 7.03 per cent stake in VFS, while Param Value Investments along with other investors holds 11.62 per cent in VFS.

== Awards and recognition ==
Awards received by the organisation are listed on its webpage.
