= Barefoot to Goa =

- Directed by: Praveen Morchhale
- Screenplay by: Praveen Morchhale
- Produced by: Praveen Morchhale
- Music by: Rohit Sharma; Jack Francis Fina (score)
- Release date: 10 April 2015
- Country: India
- Language: Hindi
- Box office: ₹ 3 lakh

Barefoot to Goa is a 2015 Indian Hindi drama film directed and produced by Praveen Morchhale. It narrates the story of two school-going kids living in Mumbai. Its release in India was crowdfunded through Morchhale's Proud Funding Campaign. It was released on 10 April 2015.Legendary Indian Playback singer KJ Yesudas sung a song in this film . It was the first after 2 decades Yesudas sung in a Bollywood film.

== Cast ==
- Saara Nahar as Diya
- Prakhar Morchhale as Prakhar
- Farrukh Jaffar as the grandmother
- Kuldeep Dubey as the father
- Purva Parag as the mother
- Ajay Chourey

== Release ==
Barefoot to Goa was screened at the Bengaluru International Film Festival (BIFFES). In India, it was released on 10 April 2015.
