= MicroFinance Institutions Network =

Microfinance Industry Network
- Formation: 2009
- Location: Gurgaon, Haryana, India
- Key people: Mr Vineet Chattree (Chairperson); Mr Dibyajyoti Pattanaik (Vice Chairperson); Dr Alok Misra (Chief Executive Officer)
- Website: http://www.mfinindia.org/

The Microfinance Industry Network (MFIN) (earlier known as Microfinance Institutions Network) is an association for the microfinance sector in India.

== Business model ==
The Microfinance Industry Network was created to promote microfinance. The network promotes responsible lending, client protection, good governance and a supportive regulatory environment. It was established in October 2009 as a society under the Andhra Pradesh Societies Registration Act 2001. According to its bylaws, all non-banking finance companies registered with the Reserve Bank of India are eligible for membership in the society. The Reserve Bank of India accorded recognition to the network via a letter dated 16 June 2014. The Microfinance Industry Network works actively with regulators and other key stakeholders.

The Microfinance Industry Network is organized into three verticals: self-regulation, advocacy & development and state initiatives.

The self-regulatory function was part of the Reserve Bank of India's remit to the network to help supervise compliance on behalf of the regulator. Microfinance Industry Network's internal whistle-blowing mechanism tries not to charge beyond rates suggested by the Reserve Bank of India from its member microfinance institutions. The Reserve Bank of India has set a cap on the lending rate of microfinance institutions at 26 per cent per year and a margin cap of 12 per cent over their cost of funds.

Currently, the network member organizations consist of 55 of the leading non-banking financial companies and microfinance institutions, whose combined businesses constitute over 90% of the Indian microfinance sector, excluding SHGs.

== Database of borrowers ==
The network tries to validate lending money beyond the client's (borrower) capability to pay back by finding the existing borrowings of the client through dedicated microfinance credit bureaus. Only two microfinance institutions can lend to one borrower, and together, they cannot provide loans beyond ₹100,000.

The network has facilitated setting up a database of the borrowers, which confirms the necessary validation. The database consists of over 30 million microborrowers and about 60 million loan accounts. When a person applies for the loan, the network checks for the loan history and verifies the Reserve Bank of India benchmark with the credit reports. The credit reports are around 80–90% accurate.
