= Walking with the Wind =

Ladakhi film

Walking with the Wind is a 2017 Ladakhi film written and directed by Praveen Morchhale. It features Ajay Chourey, Rigzin Dolkar, Phuntsog Dolma, Sachi Joko, Phunchok Toldan, and Sonam Wangyal. The film won three National awards at the 65th National Film Awards for Best Feature Film in Ladakhi, Best Sound Design, and Best Re-Recording.

== Synopsis ==
The story revolves around a kid who accidentally breaks one of his friend's school chairs. When he decides to bring the chair back to his village, the journey on a donkey turns out to be even more strenuous than expected. The chair is a metaphor for his quest for inner truth and reality which people aspire to find in the adult world.

== See also ==
- Ladakhi cinema
