= Shilpi Marwaha =

Indian actor

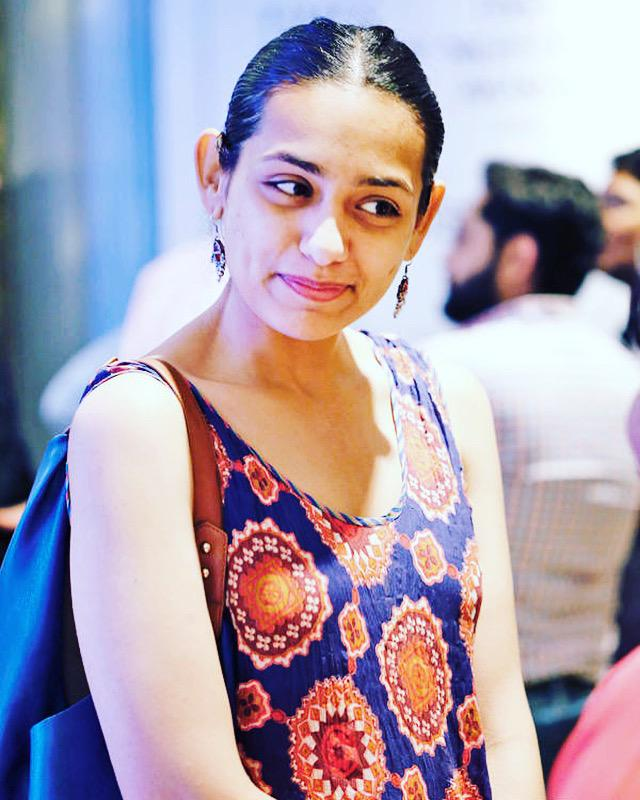
- Marwaha in July 2020
- Born: New Delhi
- Occupations: Writer, Theatre and Cinema Actor, Theatre Director
- Years active: 2007-present
- Awards: Sarla Birla Award, AAS Excellence Award 2016, DCW Achievement Award 2016

Shilpi Marwaha is an actor in the Delhi Theatre Circuit who first performed in 2008. She was a street theatre activist during the "anti corruption movement" in Delhi and the protests held at Rastrapati Bhawan, where she raised her voice against the 2012 Delhi gang rape and murder known as the "Nirbhaya" or "Damini" case. She has also worked in mainstream cinema in the Bollywood film, Raanjhanaa as Rashmi, Abhay Deol's sister, directed by Anand L. Rai in 2013, Bhoomiyude Avakashikal (The Inheritors of the Earth), directed by T. V. Chandran, "Widow of Silence" as Aasiya directed by Praveen Morchhale in 2018 and "Chhapaak" directed by Meghna Gulzar in 2020. She was awarded first Sarla Birla Award for her contribution to theatre, AAS Excellence Award 2016 for her participation in women empowerment initiatives, DCW award from Delhi Commission for Women and 'Devi' award from Indian Express Group for her contribution in women empowerment through theatre.

== Personal life and background ==
Shilpi was born and brought up in Delhi and studied Commerce at Kamla Nehru College, University of Delhi. She was active in campus theatre. She did many street and stage plays in DU.

== Acting in theatre ==
Marwaha started her career as a theatre actor in Delhi with a Delhi-based theatre group in 2008.[1] She was an active member of collegiate theatre during her student years. She is a self-trained theatre practitioner, with an expansive body of theatrical and cinematic experience. She independently curated and conducted theatre workshops in several reputed colleges. From her initial years, she conducted and designed theatre workshops and directed workshop plays.[2].

Her major plays are Dario Fo and Franca Rame's A Woman Alone, Bertolt Brecht's Ramkali (The Good Person of Szechwan), Mahesh Dattani's Final Solutions and 30 days in September, Girish Karnad's Rakt Kalyan, Swadesh Deepak's Court Martial, Rajesh Kumar's Ambedkar aur Gandhi, Mohan Rakesh's Lehro ke Rajhans, Ashok Lal's Ek Mamooli Aadmi, Unsuni (based on Harsh Mandar's book & scripted by Mallika Sarabhai), Vijay Mishra's "Tat Niranjana“, Dario Fo's adaptation Operation Three Star, based on Accidental Death of an Anarchist, Govind Purushottam Deshpande's Raastey, Dario Fo's Can't Pay won't Pay (Hindi adaptation by Amitabh Srivastava) and Mahesh Bhatt's The Last Salute, written by Rajesh Kumar. Shilpi has also worked with RJ Raunac on dramatic reading of Asghar Wajahat's stories.

Apart from acting and directing, she has written several stories and plays, all of which have been staged in Delhi. Out of the many, the following have received high accolades. “Apratyaksh", a love story of a eunuch, "Kaash", an intercaste love saga, "Purity" on the slut-shaming tendencies of society and "Rangmanch", elucidating the struggles involved in the life of an aspiring actor trying to fulfil his dream and "Asifa" on child abuse. "Out of the Box", an anthological play focusing on contemporary issues such as Domestic Violence, Mental Health, Acid Attack, Impotency and Gender Roles. [1]”Ehsaas" a solo act written and performed by Shilpi depicts a young girl's struggle to express her love and desire for other women.[2][3]

Shilpi was a part of the national award-winning documentary film Daughters of Mother India and has worked with Oscar award-winning director Ross Kaufman. She won the best actress award in 2010 in the "International short and sweet festival".

She participated in theatre workshops in various colleges in Delhi and elsewhere including Delhi University, IIT and IIM, and has judged numbers of events on stage and street plays in different colleges and universities across the nation.

== Street theatre ==
Shilpi Marwaha performed thousands of street plays in Delhi NCR and other states, based on social issues including corruption, women's empowerment, environment, road rage, Dastak, anti-ragging, LGBTQ, communal harmony, Female foeticide, child education, mental health, gender equality, domestic violence, child labour, poverty, drugs, inter-faith, etc. Marwaha is active in the Social Awareness movement, and participated in the women's safety movement to raise voice for domestic workers and in anti-corruption movement etc.

== Starting theatre group ==
In the year 2016, Shilpi faced workplace sexual harassment from the director of theatre group where she worked for almost a decade; she left the group and was joined by other senior actors who also decided to leave.

Shilpi started Sukhmanch Theatre in March 2017 in the memory of her late mother, whose name "Sukhvarsha" inspired the name of the group. As of 2019 she was working as creative head and director of the group.

== Some roles ==
- "Indira" by Nishi Chawla
- Gaaye by Rajesh Kumar
- Court Martial by Swadesh Deepak
- Kabira Khada Bazaar Mein by Bhisham Sahni
- Tafteesh by Rajesh Kumar
- Kaal Kothari by Swadesh Deepak
- A Woman Alone by Dario Fo & Franca Rame
- "Kasturba Vs Gandhi" by Dr Nishi Chawla
- Gagan Damama Bajyo by Piyush Mishra
- Ramleela by Rakesh Veda
- Seven steps around the fire by Mahesh Dattani

== Filmography ==
- 2012 – Bhoomiyude Avakashikal
- 2013 – Raanjhanaa as Rashmi
- 2018 - Widow of Silence
- 2020 - Chhapaak
- 2022 - Shabaash Mithu as Sukumari Marwaha
- 2024 - Bandaa Singh Chaudhary
