= Widow of Silence =

- Film poster
- Directed by: Praveen Morchhale
- Written by: Praveen Morchhale
- Produced by: Praveen Morchhale
- Starring: Ajay Chourey; Shilpi Marwaha; Bilal Ahmad; Noorjahan
- Cinematography: Mohammad Reza Jahanpanah
- Edited by: Anthony Joseph
- Music by: Shalini Agarwal; Sanal George; Justin Jose
- Release date: 9 December 2018
- Running time: 85 minutes
- Country: India
- Languages: Urdu; Kashmiri

Widow of Silence is an Indian drama film directed, written and produced by Praveen Morchhale who has been hailed by critics as an important filmmaker of the Indian new wave. The film stars Ajay Chourey, Shilpi Marwaha, Bilal Ahmad, and Noorjahan. It was released on 9 December 2018.

This film premiered at the 24th Kolkata International Film Festival on 12 November 2018 after debuting at the Busan International Film Festival in October 2018.

== Plot ==
Aasia is a young trainee nurse staying in a Kashmiri village with a young daughter and an ailing mother-in-law. Her husband went missing seven years ago, and after numerous futile visits to the police station, she now wants to get on with her life. For this she desperately needs a death certificate from the local registrar, a corrupt government official who has no qualms about exploiting women who line up outside his office every day. Rebuffed time and again, the registrar tries to force himself on Aasia while she is on night-duty at the hospital, and gets more than what he bargained for.

Set against the stunning autumn landscape of north Kashmir, the film casts many local non-professional actors who play their own role in real life. For instance, the poetic and cheerful taxi driver, Bilal, drives buses for a living.

== Cast ==
- Shilpi Marwaha as Aasia
- Ajay Chourey as the Registrar
- Bilal Ahmad the driver, as himself
- Noorjahan as Aasia's daughter

== Critical response ==
Widow of Silence has received positive reviews from critics and audiences alike.

The New York Times wrote that "“Widow of Silence” is a movie with a cool head and a sharp eye — one that sees greater hope in the flamboyantly jeweled tones of a carmine head scarf than in the entrenched absurdities of a broken bureaucracy.

The Hollywood Reporter wrote that the least compromised by sentimentality, it packs an unsettling message of empowerment very rare in the social injustice genre.

Roger Ebert.com has a highly praise for the film - "The final four minutes turn what was already a fine picture into an unforgettable one, affirming Morchhale’s status as one of the most exciting figures of the Indian new wave."

Devarshi Ghosh wrote on Scroll.in that "Hope is a running theme in Morchhale’s films". According to her, "In Widow of Silence, Aasia’s hope leads to a jarring poetic justice. “The end signifies not just the end of the villain but also of the system”".

Reviewing the film for the Asian Movie Pulse (AMP), Joanna KOŃCZAK noted that "Morchhale has undoubtedly brought up important issues and gave the voice to the people of the Valley, dwelling on their suffering and sorrows without a preachy tone and exaggerated melodrama. It is very rare for Indian filmmakers to take on the Kashmiri case in such an emphatic and problem-focused manner."

Belgian distributor MOOOV has picked up Benelux rights from Oration Films to Praveen Morchhale's Kashmir-set Widow Of Silence. The deal for all rights excluding airlines marks the first for the film.

== Festivals ==
Busan International Film Festival, Korea 2018, International Film Festival of Rotterdam,2019, Goteborg Film Festival,2019, Asia Pacific Screen Awards Brisbane, Australia, 2019 (Competition), IFF of Asian Cinema Vesoul, 2019, Seattle International Film Festival USA, 2019, Fajr International Film Festival IRAN 2019 (Int. Competition), Jerusalem International Film Festival Israel, 2019 (Int. Competition – Political Films), Taipe International Film Festival, Taiwan 2019, Hamburg Film Festival Germany, 2019 (International Competition), The International Film Festival of Mannheim-Heidelberg, Germany (International Competition)2019, Kolkata International Film Festival 2018, Kerala International. Film Festival 2018 (International Competition).

== Awards ==
At the MOOOV Film Fest, 2019 Belgium film was Winner - Best film award in International competition and Behind the Scene Award by another Jury.

At the 17th edition of the Indian Festival of Los Angeles (IFFLA) this film bagged the Grand Jury award for the best feature.

Best Indian Film Award at Kolkata International Film Festival, 2018

'Widow of Silence' has been selected for screening at the 48th International Film Festival Rotterdam 2019 in the Voice section.

At Busan International Film Festival 2018 this film was nominated for the Kim Jiseok Awards.
