= Yoginder K Alagh =

Indian economist (1939–2022)

Yoginder K. Alagh
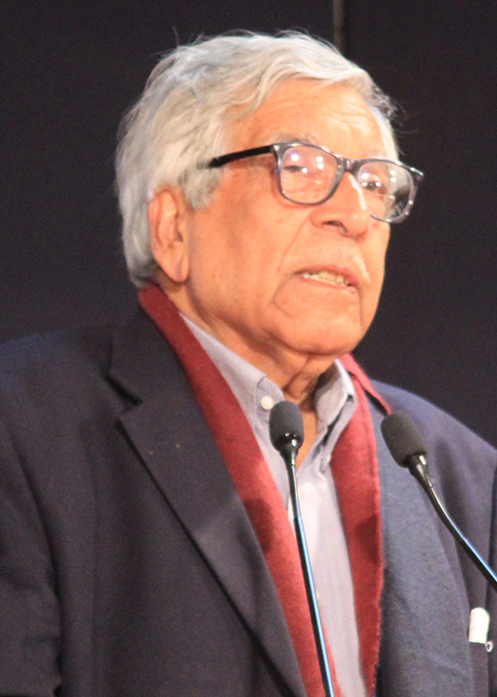
- Alagh at Gujarat Vishwakosh Trust in 2020
- Born: 14 February 1939; Chakwal, Punjab, British India
- Died: 6 December 2022 (aged 83); Ahmedabad, Gujarat, India
- Education: University of Pennsylvania (M.Sc., Ph.D.); University of Rajasthan (M.Sc)
- Occupation: Economist
- Known for: Former Member of Indian Planning Commission

Yoginder K. Alagh (14 February 1939 – 6 December 2022) was an Indian economist and Union Minister of Government of India. He was the Chairman of Institute of Rural Management Anand (IRMA) from 2006 to 2012. He was the Chancellor of the Central University of Gujarat, Gandhinagar.

== Early life ==
Alagh was born at Chakwal in Punjab, now in Pakistan, to Bhagat Ram. He studied at Maharaja's College, Jaipur and Department of Economics at University of Rajasthan. He held a doctorate in Economics from the University of Pennsylvania, USA.

== Career ==
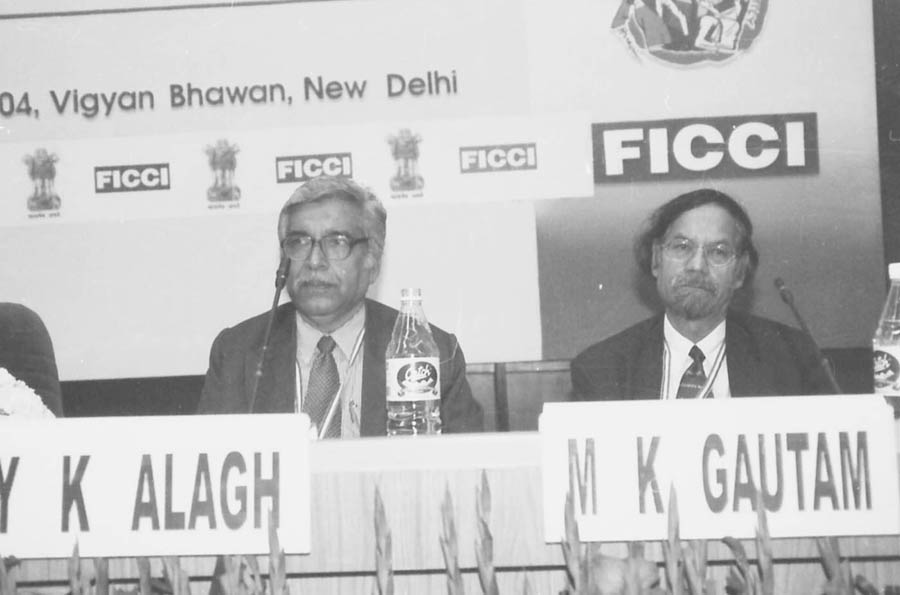
The Chairman Civil Service Examination Review Committee, Union Public Service Commission Prof. Y.K. Alagh (left) speaking at the 2nd Pravasi Bharatiya Divas - 2004 in New Delhi on 11 January 2004

=== Academic career ===
Alagh taught Economics at the University of Rajasthan, Indian Institute of Management Calcutta, University of Jodhpur, Swarthmore College and the University of Pennsylvania. He acted as the 7th Vice-Chancellor of the Jawaharlal Nehru University, New Delhi. He was founding member of Centre for Environmental Planning and Technology (CEPT), Ahmedabad presently one of India's pioneering Planning and Public policy institutes.

=== Political career ===
Alagh was elected to Rajya Sabha from Gujarat in November 1996 and continued till April 2000.

From 1996 to 1998, he was a Minister of State (Independent Charge) for Planning and Programme Implementation, Science and Technology and Power for Government of India. He headed various institutions and Commissions and acted as expert with a number of UN organisations. He was also the Member of Planning Commission, Govt. of India.

== Personal life ==
Alagh was married to Raksha Alagh on 9 June 1967. He had a daughter, Tavishi Alagh (an independent filmmaker) and a son, Munish Alagh (post doctoral fellow at IIM Ahmedabad).

Alagh died on 6 December 2022, at the age of 83.

== Awards ==
1. V K R V Rao Prizes in Social Science Research in 1981 in Economics discipline. The award is instituted by Institute for Social and Economic Change, Bengaluru, India.

^Fellow, Indian Society of Agricultural Economics, Elected First Fellow of the Society in 2011

== Publications ==
- Indian Development Planning and Policy, Wider Studies in Development Economics, 1991, Second Edition, 1995
- Sustainable Development : From Concept to Action, Techniques for Planners, Geneva, UNCED, reprinted in Land and Man : Essays in Sustainable Development, Delhi, Har Anand, 1995
- Growth Performance of the Indian Economy, Journal of Developing Economics, Tokyo, Vol. XXX, n° 2, pp. 97–116
- Indian Development Models, in Essays in the Honour of P.C. Mahalonobis, Indian National Science Academy, 1995
- Fuel for Power, Lovraj Kumar memorial lecture, 1996, Current Science, Nov. 1996
- State of the Indian Farmer: An Overview, Academic Press and Ministry of Agriculture, 2004
- On Sherpas and Coolies: The L20 and Non Brahmanical Futures, in John English, R.Thakur and A.F.Cooper ed., Reforming From the Top, A Leaders 20 Summit, UNU Press, pp. 169–186
- Agriculture in A Rural Urban Continuum, Indian Journal of Agricultural Economics, April 2011, pp. 165–177
- Green Revolution, The New Oxford Companion to Economics in India, Vol.1, p. 301, Oxford University Press, 2012
- India2020, Journal of Quantitative Economics, Jan. 2006, pp. 1–14
- The Future of Indian Agriculture, 2013, National Book Trust
- 'Economic Policy in a Liberalising Economy:The Indian Case', Springer Economic Policy Briefs, Springer Macmillan, 2018.
