= List of University of Mumbai people =

This is a list of the notable alumni of the University of Mumbai, one of the largest universities in the world, and its affiliated colleges.

== Arts ==
Name	Class Year	Degree	College	Notability	References
Aditi Govitrikar				model and actress	
Aditya Roy Kapur			St. Xavier's	actor	
Aishwarya Rai	did not graduate	B. Arch.	Rachana Sansad	actress	
Ajay Devgn			Mithibai	actor	
Ali Fazal			St. Xavier's	actor	
Anand Patwardhan				documentary film-maker	
Anant Pai				publisher of Indian books for children, especially the series Amar Chitra Katha	
Anil Kapoor	did not graduate		St. Xavier's	actor	
Boman Irani			Mithibai	actor	
Bhavya Gandhi			University of Mumbai	actor	
Dadasaheb Phalke				Indian producer-director-screenwriter, known as "the father of Indian cinema"	
Darsheel Safary			H.R. College of Commerce and Economics	actor	
Divine			R. D. National	rapper	
Ebrahim Alkazi				theatre director, Padma Vibhushan awardee	
Emraan Hashmi				actor	
Farah Khan			St. Xavier's	film director	
Gangadhar Gadgil				author	
Genelia D'souza			St. Andrew's	actress	
Ismail Merchant			St. Xavier's	film director	
Javed Jaffery				actor	
Jayanti Patel	1947	BA and Ph.D.		actor, playwright	
John Abraham			Jai Hind	actor	
Jui Gadkari				actor	
Jyotsna Milan		MA (Gujarati literature)		novelist, short story writer, poet and editor	
Kader Khan				actor	
Kajal Aggarwal			Kishinchand Chellaram	actress	
Kareena Kapoor			Mithibai	actress	
Kiara Advani		BA (Mass Communications)	Jai Hind	actress	
Kishori Amonkar			Elphinstone (Note: The Elphinstone College was affiliated to the University of Mumbai between 1858 and 2019.)	Indian classical singer	
Lara Dutta				model and actress	
Madhuri Dixit			Sathaye	actress	
Manish Malhotra			Elphinstone	fashion designer	
Mario Miranda		BA (History)	St. Xavier's	cartoonist	
Mehli Mehta				conductor of Western classical music	
Mehnaz Hoosein			St. Xavier's	singer and songwriter	
Nikhil D'Souza			St. Xavier's	playback singer, songwriter, and guitarist	
Nissim Ezekiel				poet	
P. L. Deshpande				writer, actor, composer, film and television producer and director	
Plabita Borthakur			Jai Hind	actress and singer	
Priyakanta Laishram		BA (Mass Media)	Lala Lajpat Rai College Of Commerce And Economics	actor, film director, film producer, screenwriter and film editor.	
Priyanka Chopra	Did not graduate		Jai Hind	actress and model	
Rohinton Mistry				author	
Rohit Suresh Saraf			St. Xavier's	actor	
Sarah-Jane Dias			St. Andrew's	actress	
Shabana Azmi			St. Xavier's	actress	
Shefali Zariwala	2005		SPIT	actress	
Shruti Haasan			St. Andrew's	actress	
Shaan			Jai Hind	singer and actor	
Shweta Shetty	did not graduate		Jai Hind	singer	
Smita Patil				actress	
Sobhita Dhulipala			H.R. College of Commerce and Economics	actress	
Sonakshi Sinha				actress	
Sonam Kapoor				actress	
Srinivas			UDCT (Note: The University Department of Chemical Technology (now known as the Institute of Chemical Technology) was affiliated between 1933 and 2008.)	playback singer	
Suneeta Rao			St. Xavier's	playback singer	
Tara Sutaria			St. Andrew's	actress	
Urmila Matondkar				actress	
Vatsal Sheth			Mithibai	actor	
Vidya Balan			St. Xavier's	actress	
Zakir Hussain			St. Xavier's	tabla player	
Zubin Mehta			St. Xavier's	conductor of Western classical music	
Harshada Pathare (Author)				author and storyteller	

== Business ==
Name	Class Year	Degree	College	Notability	References
Adi Godrej				Chairman of Godrej Group	
Ajay Piramal		B. Sc.; MBA	Jai Hind; Jamnalal Bajaj	Chairman, Piramal Group	
Ajit Gulabchand				industrialist, chairman and managing director Hindustan Construction Company	
Anil Ambani		B.Sc.	Kishinchand Chellaram	Chairman of Anil Dhirubhai Ambani Group	
Anji Reddy			UDCT	founder of Dr. Reddy's Laboratories	
Ashwin Choksi			Sydenham (Note: The Sydenham College was affiliated to the University of Mumbai between 1913 and 2019.)	billionaire non executive chairman of Asian Paints	
Avtar Saini			VJTI	former director for South Asia Region, Intel; one of the pioneers of the Pentium-series processors	
Chanda Kochhar	1982	BCom; MBA	Jai Hind; Jamnalal Bajaj	CEO and MD of ICICI Bank	
Chinubhai Madhowlal Ranchhodlal, 2nd Baronet				businessman and philanthropist	
Dorabji Tata				former chairman of Tata group	
Jagdish Chandra Mahindra			VJTI	industrialist, founder of Mahindra Group	
Keki Hormusji Gharda				founder of Gharda Chemicals	
Keki Mistry		BCom	Sydenham	Vice-chairman and CEO HDFC	
Leena Tewari		B.Com		Chairperson of USV Private Limited	
Mukesh Ambani			UDCT	Chairman and managing director of Reliance Industries, billionaire	
Narotam Sekhsaria				co-founder and chairman of Ambuja Cements	
Nirmal Jain			Narsee Monjee	founder and chairman of India Infoline (IIFL)	
Nita Ambani				founder and chairperson of the Dhirubhai Ambani International School	
Nitin Paranjpe		MBA	Jamnalal Bajaj		
Pankaj Patel				Chairman and managing director of Cadila Healthcare	
Rahul Bajaj	1960	LLB	Government Law College		
Rakesh Jhunjhunwala			Sydenham	billionaire	
Renuka Ramnath				founder and CEO of Multiples Private Equity, ex-CEO of ICICI Ventures	
Swati Piramal					
Tarang Jain		BCom		billionaire founder of Varroc	
Uday Kotak	1982	MBA	Sydenham; Jamnalal Bajaj	billionaire and executive vice chairman and managing director of Kotak Mahindra Bank	
Vinita Bali		MBA	Jamnalal Bajaj	Managing Director of Britannia Industries	
Xerxes Desai		BA	Elphinstone	founding managing director of Titan	

== Humanities and Social Sciences ==
Name	Class Year	Degree	College	Notability	References
Avinash Dixit				John J. F. Sherrerd '52 University Professor of Economics Emeritus at Princeton University	
G.S. Maddala	1957	M.A. in Statistics		American economist and mathematician	
Daya Bai		MSW		Social activist	
Homi K. Bhabha		BA	Elphinstone	Anne F. Rothenberg Professor of English and American Literature and Language, and director of the Humanities Center, Harvard University	
M. N. Srinivas		Ph.D.	Elphinstone	Professor Emeritus at Delhi University; Pioneering social anthropologist and sociologist	
G. S. Ghurye		BA; MA	Elphinstone	Professor Emeritus & HOD at University of Bombay; Founder of The Bombay School (Sociology)	
Indira Viswanathan Peterson		BA (English Literature)		Indologist	
Jagdish Bhagwati		BA	Sydenham	University Professor of Economics at Columbia University	
Klaus Klostermaier	1969	Ph.D.		Professor Emeritus at the University of Manitoba, scholar of Indian Studies	
Madhav Das Nalapat				academic, columnist, and UNESCO Peace Chair	
Madhav Sadashiv Gore	1942			Vice-Chancellor of Jawaharlal Nehru University and Padma Bhushan awardee	
Pandurang Vaman Kane				Indologist and Sanskrit scholar and former Vice-Chancellor of University of Mumbai	
Ramakrishna Gopal Bhandarkar	1862			Oriental scholar and social reformer, first batch graduate, later vice-chancellor	
M. N. Srinivas		BA; MA; PhD	St. Xavier's	historian	
M.S. Commissariat	1903, 1905	BA; MA	St. Xavier's College, Mumbai	Professor of History and Economics at Gujarat College	
Manjulal Majmudar	1943	Ph.D.		Professor of Gujarati at Baroda College	

== Journalism ==
Name	Class Year	Degree	College	Notability	References
Homai Vyarawalla				first woman photojournalist of India, Padma Vibushan awardee	
Samarth Singh				former Times of India writer, foreign affairs blogger, Spain India Council Foundation	
Sucheta Dalal				business journalist	
Thrity Umrigar				journalist and author	

== Law ==
Name	Class Year	Degree	College	Notability	References
B.N. Srikrishna		B. Sc.;LLB; LLM	Elphinstone; Government Law College	Judge of the Supreme Court of India	
Bhulabhai Desai				Indian independence activist and acclaimed lawyer	
Cyril Shroff				Managing Partner, Cyril Amarchand Mangaldas	
Dilip Babasaheb Bhosale				Chief Justice of the Allahabad High Court	
H. J. Kania	1912; 1913	LLB; LLM	Government Law College	1st Chief Justice of India	
Kashinath Trimbak Telang				Judge of the Bombay High Court	
M. C. Chagla				former Chief Justice of the Bombay High Court	
Madhukar Hiralal Kania			Government Law College	23rd Chief Justice of India	
Mushtak Ali Kazi				Judge of the High Court of Sindh and Balochistan	
N. Nagaresh				Judge of the High Court of Kerala	
Nanabhoy Palkhivala				jurist and economist	
P. B. Gajendragadkar	1926		ILS (Note: The ILS Law College was affiliated to the University of Mumbai until 1949.)	7th Chief Justice of India	
P. N. Bhagwati	1941		Elphinstone; Government Law College	17th Chief Justice of India	
Dorab Patel	1944	LLB		1st Chief Justice of Sindh, former judge of the Supreme Court of Pakistan	
S. K. Venkataranga				lawyer; an associate of Mahatma Gandhi	
Sam Piroj Bharucha			Government Law College	30th Chief Justice of India	
S. H. Kapadia			Government Law College	38th Chief Justice of India	
Sujata Manohar			Elphinstone	Judge Supreme court of India	
Cornelia Sorabji				First female graduate from Bombay University, first woman to study law at Oxford University and the first female advocate in India	

== Military ==
Name	Class Year	Degree	College	Notability	References
Satish Nambiar			St. Xavier's	Force Commander and Head of Mission of the United Nations Protection Force; Lieutenant General of the Indian Army	

== Politics ==
=== Heads of State and Government ===
Name	Class Year	Degree	College	Notability	References
Iskander Mirza	did not graduate		Elphinstone	1st President of Pakistan	
John Samuel Malecela	1959	B.Com.		6th Prime Minister of Tanzania	
Morarji Desai			Wilson (Note: The Wilson College is affiliated to the University of Mumbai since 1861.)	4th Prime Minister of India	
Muhammad Ali Jinnah				1st Governor-General of Pakistan	
Pratibha Patil	1963		Government Law College	12th President of India	

=== Other politicians, civil servants, and diplomats ===
Name	Class Year	Degree	College	Notability	References
Ashley J. Tellis				Tata Chair of Strategic Affairs at the Carnegie Endowment for International Peace	
B. R. Ambedkar	1913	BA	Elphinstone	economist, social reformer, Chairman of the Constitution Drafting Committee and Minister of Law and Justice	
Bal Gangadhar Tilak	1879	LLB	Government Law College	Nationalist leader, savant, philosopher, mathematician, and advocate of Swaraj (self-rule)	
Burgula Ramakrishna Rao	1923		Fergusson (Note: The Fergusson College was affiliated to the University of Mumbai between 1885 and 1948.)	former Chief Minister of Hyderabad State and 4th Governor of Uttar Pradesh	
C. D. Deshmukh			Elphinstone	Minister of Finance	
Chintaman Dwarakanath Deshmukh				3rd Governor of the Reserve Bank of India	
Dadabhai Naoroji				intellectual, educator, cotton trader, and an early Indian political leader; the first Asian to sit in the British House of Commons	
Godfrey Serunkuma Lule	1961	LLB		former Minister of Justice and Constitutional Affairs of Uganda	
Gopal Krishna Gokhale				social and political leader during the Indian Independence Movement	
Habib Rahimtoola			St. Xavier's	former Governor of Sindh	
I. G. Patel				14th Governor of the Reserve Bank of India	
Jai Pratap Singh				Cabinet Minister In UP Government	
Kona Prabhakara Rao		LLB	ILS	State Governor of Maharashtra, Pondicherry and Sikkim; Finance Minister of Andhra Pradesh; former speaker of Andhra Pradesh State Assembly	
Kshama Sawant				member of the Seattle City Council (2014–present)	
Lal Krishna Advani		LLB	Government Law College	former Deputy Prime Minister of India	
Mahadev Govind Ranade				distinguished scholar, social reformer and author	
Manohar Joshi				former Chief Minister of Maharashtra	
Mancherjee Bhownagree				British politician of Indian Parsi heritage.	
Manubhai Mehta				Dewan of Baroda state; Prime Minister of Bikaner state	
Mohan Lal Sukhadia		DE	VJTI	Chief Minister of Rajasthan	
Nilesh Rane				MP from Ratnagiri-Sindhudurg	
Pherozeshah Mehta	1864	BA; MA		President of the Indian National Congress; Indian independence activist	
Praful Patel				MP from Bhandara-Gondiya	
Rafiq Zakaria				politician and Islamic scholar	
Raj Thackeray				founder, leader and chairperson of the Maharashtra Navnirman Sena	
Sanjay Dina Patil				MP from Mumbai North East	
Sanjeev Naik				MP from Thane.	
Shanti Gandhi				US politician and physician	
Shivraj Patil				Governor of Punjab and former Home Minister of India	
Sushilkumar Shinde				former Home Minister of India	
Swati Dandekar				Member of the Iowa House of Representatives	
Vasundhara Raje				Chief Minister of Rajasthan, India	
Yashwantrao Chavan	1938	BA		1st Chief Minister of Maharashtra; 5th Deputy Prime Minister of India	

== Religion ==
Name	Class Year	Degree	College	Notability	References
Oswald Gracias			St. Xavier's	Roman Catholic Cardinal and Archbishop of Bombay	
Simon Pimenta			St. Xavier's	Roman Catholic Cardinal and Archbishop Emeritus of Bombay	
Virchand Gandhi				Jain scholar and lawyer known for representing Jainism at the first World Parliament of Religions, Chicago 1893	

== Royalty and Nobility ==
Name	Class Year	Degree	College	Notability	References
Bhawanrao Shriniwasrao Pant Pratinidhi				9th Raja of Aundh State	
Karni Singh		PhD	St. Xavier's	titular Maharaja of Bikaner State	
Udaybhansinhji Natwarsinhji Jethwa		BA		last Maharaja of Porbandar State	

== Science, Technology, Engineering, and Mathematics ==
Name	Class Year	Degree	College	Notability	References
Acacio Gabriel Viegas			Grant Medical	medical practitioner credited with the discovery of the outbreak of bubonic plague in Mumbai, India in 1896	
Amol Dighe				professor of physics in Tata Institute of Fundamental Research	
Anil Kakodkar	1963		D. G. Ruparel; VJTI	former director of BARC, Chairman of the Atomic Energy Commission and Secretary to the Government of India Department of Atomic Energy	
Ashish Kishore Lele	1988		UDCT	chemical engineer, Shanti Swarup Bhatnagar laureate	
Bal Dattatreya Tilak				former director of National Chemical Laboratory and recipient of Shanti Swarup Bhatnagar Prize, Padma Bhushan	
Beena Pillai				microbiologist, N-Bios laureate	
C. S. Seshadri	1958	PhD		mathematician and recipient of Shanti Swarup Bhatnagar Prize	
Chandrashekhar Khare				professor of mathematics at the University of California Los Angeles	
Chunni Lal Khetrapal	1965	PhD		chemical physicist and Shanti Swarup Bhatnagar laureate	
D. Raghavarao	1961	PhD		statistician and Laura H. Carnell Professor and chair of statistics at Temple University	
Dolly Dastoor				Clinical psychologist and expert in geriatric psychiatry who co-developed the "Hierarchic Dementia Scale for Assessment and Prognosis of Dementia" (HDS)	
Doraiswami Ramkrishna	1960	BE	UDCT	Harry Creighton Peffer Distinguished Professor of Chemical Engineering at Purdue University	
Dwarkanath Kotnis		MBBS	Seth G.S. Medical (Note: The Seth Gordhandas Sunderdas Medical College was affiliated to the University of Mumbai between 1926 and 1998.)	doctor practising in China who helped the Chinese communist army during World War II	
E. V. Sampathkumaran				condensed matter physicist, Shanti Swarup Bhatnagar laureate	
Edward Hamilton Aitken				entomologist and zoologist	
Gopal Krishna				radio astronomer, Shanti Swarup Bhatnagar laureate	
Homi Jahangir Bhabha			Elphinstone	nuclear physicist who played a major role in the development of India's atomic energy programme	
Homi Sethna			St. Xavier's	former Chairman, Atomic Energy Commission	
Jayant B. Udgaonkar	1979		St. Xavier's	molecular biologist and Shanti Swarup Bhatnagar laureate	
John Barnabas				evolutionary biologist, Shanti Swarup Bhatnagar Prize (1974)	
Jyeshtharaj Joshi				Indian chemical engineer and nuclear scientist, emeritus professor at Department of Atomic Energy	
Keshavrao Krishnarao Datey			Seth G.S. Medical	cardiologist	
Krishnaswamy Kasturirangan				space scientist and former head of the Indian Space Research Organisation	
Nilima Arun Kshirsagar				Clinical Pharmacologists, former dean of KEM Hospital Mumbai.	
M. Visvesvaraya			College of Engineering, Pune (Note: The College of Engineering, Pune was affiliated to the University of Mumbai between 1858 and 1948.)	Engineer responsible for the construction of the Krishna Raja Sagara dam and the flood protection system of Hyderabad.	
Madhav Gadgil				ecologist and professor at Indian Institute of Science	
Man Mohan Sharma			UDCT	F.R.S., former director of UDCT, Padma Vibhushan and Padma Bhushan awardee	
Manil Suri				mathematician	
Mohammad Ali Reza Khan	1977	PhD		ornithologist	
Mudumbai Seshachalu Narasimhan				mathematician and recipient of Shanti Swarup Bhatnagar Prize (1975)	
Muffazal Lakdawala		MBBS	Grant Medical	obesity surgeon; laparoscopic expert; founder of the Centre for Obesity and Digestive Surgery	
Mustansir Barma				Director of Tata Institute of Fundamental Research	
N. S. Satya Murthy	1967	PhD		physicist, Shanti Swarup Bhatnagar laureate	
Nissim Kanekar				astrophysicist, Shanti Swarup Bhatnagar laureate	
Nuggehalli Raghuveer Moudgal				endocrinologist, Shanti Swarup Bhatnagar laureate	
Raja Ramanna		M.Sc.		nuclear scientist	
Raghavan Narasimhan	1963			mathematician and professor at University of Chicago	
Raghunath Mashelkar	1966; 1969	BE; PhD	UDCT	former Director General of Council of Scientific and Industrial Research	
Ramakrishnan Nagaraj				biochemist, Shanti Swarup Bhatnagar laureate	
Ravi Gomatam	1998	Ph.D.		quantum physicist, director of Bhaktivedanta Institute	
Rena D'Souza	1977	BDS		dentist, developmental biologist, Director of the National Institute of Dental and Craniofacial Research	
Renee M. Borges				ecologist	
Salim Ali		did not graduate	St. Xavier's	Ornithologist and naturalist	
Sekhar Basu	1974		VJTI	Chairman of the Atomic Energy Commission of India	
Sethunathasarma Krishnaswami	1974	PhD		geochemist, Shanti Swarup Bhatnagar laureate	
Sharad Panday			Seth G.S. Medical	cardio-thoracic surgeon	
Shreeram Shankar Abhyankar			The Institute of Science (Note: The Institute of Science was affiliated to the University of Mumbai between 1920 and 2019.)	Mathematician known for his contributions to algebraic geometry, and former Marshall Professor and chair of mathematics at Purdue University	
Tehemton Erach Udwadia			Seth G.S. Medical	surgeon	
Vidita Vaidya			St. Xavier's		
Vijay Gupchup	1958	BE	VJTI	expert in the field of civil engineering and structural engineering.	
Vijay Kumar Kapahi	1975	PhD		astrophysicist, Shanti Swarup Bhatnagar laureate	
Virendra Nath Pandey	1985	PhD		molecular virologist, Shanti Swarup Bhatnagar laureate	
Vivek Ranade	1983; 1988	BTech; PhD	UDCT	chemical engineer, Shanti Swarup Bhatnagar laureate	

== Sports ==
Name	Class Year	Degree	College	Notability	References
Ajit Agarkar			D. G. Ruparel	cricketer	
Anjali Bhagwat			Kirti M. Doongursee	shooter	
Ashok Mankad			St. Xavier's	cricketer	
Aryaman Birla				cricketer	
Datta Gaekwad				cricketer	
Dattu Phadkar			Elphinstone	cricketer	
Dilip Sardesai			Wilson	cricketer	
Farokh Engineer				cricketer	
Harish Kapadia				mountaineer	
Jude Menezes		BA	St. Andrew's	field hockey goalkeeper	
Kamlesh Mehta			Podar College	table tennis player	
Leo Pinto			St. Xavier's	field hockey player	
Madhav Apte			Elphinstone	cricketer	
Michael Ferreira		BA	St. Xavier's	amateur billiards player	
Milind Rege			St. Xavier's	cricketer	
Nari Contractor			St. Xavier's	cricketer	
Polly Umrigar			St. Xavier's	cricketer	
Ravi Shastri				cricketer and current head coach of the Indian national cricket team	
Rohan Gavaskar			Podar College	cricketer	
Sanjay Manjrekar			Podar College	cricketer	
Saurabh Netravalkar			SPIT	cricketer	
Shreyas Iyer			Podar College	cricketer	
Sunil Gavaskar			St. Xavier's	cricketer and former captain of the Indian national cricket team	
Vijay Merchant			Elphinstone	cricketer	
Yasin Merchant			Narsee Monjee	snooker player	

== Notable faculty ==
Name	Affiliation	Notability	References
Anuradha Misra	professor and head of department of physics	physicist	
Asaf Ali Asghar Fyzee	Principal and Perry Professor of Jurisprudence in Government Law College	writer and diplomat	
Mohanlal Lallubhai Dantwala	professor and head of department of economics	Indian independence activist, agricultural economist, academic and writer	
