= List of Indian businesswomen =

This is a list of notable businesswomen from India.

== Banking and finance ==
- Archana Bhargava, Chairman and Managing Director, United Bank of India
- Arundhati Bhattacharya, Chairperson, State Bank of India (since October 7, 2013) - now retired
- Chanda Kochhar (born 1961), ICICI Bank Former MD and CEO
- Chitra Ramkrishna, Former Managing Director and CEO, National Stock Exchange of India
- Kalpana Morparia, CEO of South Asia and India Operations at JPMorgan Chase
- Naina Lal Kidwai, Group General Manager and Country Head of HSBC India
- Renuka Ramnath, founder of Multiples Alternate Asset Management
- Shikha Sharma (born 1960), AXIS Bank Former CEO - now retired
- Snehlata Shrivastava, Executive Director, National Bank for Agriculture and Rural Development
- Usha Sangwan, Managing Director, Life Insurance Corporation of India

== Real estate and construction ==
- Sheila Sri Prakash, Chief Architect and Founder of Shilpa Architects; Independent Board Director of Chennai Smart Cities Ltd and Chairperson of the Board of Directors of Nirmana Investments

== Books, art and media ==
- Shobhana Bhartia (born 1957), Chairperson and Editorial Director of the Hindustan Times Group
- Ekta Kapoor (born 1975), TV and movie producer, Joint Managing Director and Creative Director of Balaji Telefilms
- Ritu Kumar (born 1944), fashion designer
- Zarina Mehta, Chief Creative Officer of Broadcasting at UTV
- Chiki Sarkar, publisher, Penguin Books India
- Ashvini Yardi, Programming Head of TV channel Colors
- Tanya Mittal (born 1995), fashion designer, Chief Executive Officer of HandMadeLove

== Equipment ==
- Tanya Dubash, Executive Director and President (Marketing) of Godrej Group
- Sulajja Firodia Motwani, Joint Managing Director of Kinetic Engineering
- Lila Poonawalla, former CEO of Alfa Laval India and TetraPak India
- Mallika Srinivasan (born 1959), CEO of Tafe Motors And Tractors Limited

== Food and beverages ==
- Vinita Bali (born 1955), former MD of Britannia Industries Limited
- Indra Nooyi (born 1955), Former Chairman and CEO of PepsiCo

== Health and medicine ==
- Kiran Mazumdar-Shaw (born 1953), Chairman and Managing Director of Biocon
- Swati Piramal, Vice Chairperson, Piramal Enterprises
- Ameera Shah, CEO and Managing Director, Metropolis Healthcare
- Namita Thapar, Executive Director, Emcure Pharmaceuticals Limited

== Hotels and catering ==
- Priya Paul (born 1967), Chairperson of Apeejay Surrendra Park Hotels

== Information technology ==
- Divya Jain, founder of dLoop
- Aruna Jayanthi, CEO India Capgemini
- Roshni Nadar (born 1972), Executive Director and CEO of HCL Corporation

== Others ==
- Meena Ganesh, CEO and Managing Director, Pearson Education Services
- Jyoti Gogte (born 1956), Indian entrepreneur
- Nyrika C. Holkar, executive director of Godrej & Boyce, a part of the Godrej Enterprises Group
- Nabomita Mazumdar, businesswoman
- Zia Mody (born 1956), legal consultant, managing partner of AZB & Partners
- Smriti Nagpal, CEO of Atulyakala
- Leena Nair (born 1969), Executive Director, HR, Hindustan Unilever
- Lavanya Nalli, vice chairman of Nalli Group of Companies
- Rajani Pandit, founder of the Rajani Investigative Bureau
- Sheetal Agashe (born 1977), managing director of Brihans Natural Products
