= Pondicherry University School of Management =

Management school for Pondicherry University, India

Coordinates: 12.02°N 79.85°E

Pondicherry University School of Management (SOM PU) is the management school of the Pondicherry University in Puducherry, India. It was established in 1984. SOM PU offers bachelors, masters, and doctoral programs.

== History ==
The School of Management started in 1985 and offers MBAs in teaching, management research, organisational management, government officers training, industrial consulting and management extension.

== Accreditation ==
The Management School is accredited by University Grants Commission (UGC), All India Council for Technical Education (AICTE) and National Assessment and Accreditation Council (NAAC).

== Location ==
Pondicherry University is located in a 780 acres (320 ha) campus, facing the Bay of Bengal on the East Coast Road. It is located 168 kilometres (104 mi) from Chennai and 300 kilometres (190 mi) from Bangalore.

== Academics ==
The School of Management (SOM) is the first academic entity of the university established as a stand-alone school in 1986. In 2005, SOM was reorganized into six departments: Department of Management Studies, Department of Commerce, Department of Economics, Department of Tourism Studies, Department of Banking Technology and Department of International Business.

1. The Department of Management Studies offers M.B.A. & Ph.D. programmes.

2. The Department of Commerce offers M.Com. (Business Finance), M.Phil. and Ph.D. programmes.

3. The Department of Economics offers M.A. ( Applied Economics), M.Phil. and Ph.D. programmes.

4. The Department of Tourism Studies offers a M.B.A. programme specializing in Tourism.

5. The Department of Banking Technology offers a specialized B.Tech, M.B.A. and Ph.D. programme in Banking Technology.

6. The Department of International Business offers M.B.A. with specialization in International Business and Ph.D. programme.

== Annual events ==
Synapse: an industry interface event where CEOs, entrepreneurs, leaders and corporate people are invited to speak on different management related topics.

Globizz: a two-day industry-institute interface panel discussion on various streams of international business.

Akansha: organised by the Department of Tourism Studies, School of Management. The event includes programmes like 'Interface with experts', 'Panel Discussions', 'Special Lectures', 'Ethnic Museum', 'Art and Photography Exhibition' etc.

== Faculty ==
A variety of teaching and learning techniques are employed to impart knowledge and skills to students at School of Management Studies in its various departments.

== Notable alumni ==
Ashwin Mahesh - Politician, Social Technologist, Former Astronomer, Former NASA scientist and a leader of Lok Satta Party

Saundarya Rajesh - social entrepreneur and Founder-President of Avtar
