= Prabir Sandell =

Prabir Kumar Sandell
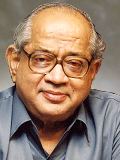
- Born: 18 February 1934 (age 92); India
- Education: St. Xavier's College, Kolkata, University College of Technology, Kolkata, Jamnalal Bajaj Institute of Management Studies
- Occupation: Business executive
- Known for: Introduction of Color Television in India in 1982 and institutionalizing technology in developing countries.

Prabir Kumar Sandell (born 18 February 1934) is an Indian business executive who is the Chairman of Eltech Group of Companies, a member of the governing body of Electronic Skill Sector Council, a management committee member of the Associated Chamber of Commerce and Industry (Assocham) in India, and Chairman of the Chamber's national council on yoga and meditation.

== Early and personal life ==
Prabir was born in Kolkata, India, on 18 February 1934 in the Sandell family. He had his earlier education at Rabindranath Tagore institution, Viswabharati, and St. Xavier's School and College in Kolkata, West Bengal. After graduating with physics honors, he completed his M.Sc. (tech) degree and published 3 research notes in nuclear physics in Indian Journal of Physics. Subsequently, he obtained his Ph.D. degree in international management and also was awarded a diploma in marketing from Bombay University.

== Career ==
Sandell started work in Philips India Ltd., a subsidiary of the international Philips group, from 1956 to 1972 as a manager of the scientific and professional electronic division, and in this role, he drove the first-ever manufacturing in India of electronic instruments and professional electronic equipment in Bombay, Pune, and Kolkata. Subsequently, from 1972 to 1982, as general manager of the communication division of Tata Group's Forbes company and as managing director of Uptron Electronics, a UP state government company, he led the manufacturing of power electronics equipment in India. Subsequently, at the invitation of the government of India, he joined E.T.&T as managing director of the electronics trade and technology development company of the government of India.

As chairman of ET&T, Sandell developed the concept of using low power terrestrial transmission technology by using S-Band transmission satellite transducers and large parabolic dishes at reception centers in cities spread throughout India. This proposal resulted in lower cost (about Rupees 25 lacs per system) compared to the alternative solution of using high power systems proposed by Doordarshan, the government's official TV authority. This was operational across 20 cities within 9 months as against 2 years required by Doordarshan engineers. Sandell was also the first to drive the indigenous manufacturing of O.B. color TV vans for outdoor coverage of TV events. He also facilitated the training of local manufacturers of color TV sets and other peripherals such as antennae. As a result of these efforts, all these methods and designs for color TV manufacturing and transmission were standardized by the government of India.

Subsequently, as a member of UNIDO, Sandell created the Institute of Small Scale Electronics Production in Bandung, Indonesia in collaboration with National Electronics Laboratory of the Government of Indonesia.

== Recognition ==
- Lifelong Award for Service to Small Scale IT Industry of India by Skoch Foundation, New Delhi
- Award for Outstanding Management by Amity University, International Management Division
- Award for Outstanding Export Performance to Sandell in his Role as chairman, Electronic and Software Export Promotion Council of India

== References and Publications ==
- Digital Divide by Dilip K. Ghosh
- Rise and Decline of Telecommunication Revolution in India by Prabir K. Sandell and Dilip K. Ghosh
- "Telecom Sector Is Undergoing Transition: Pitroda." The Hindu. N.p., 08 Apr. 2013. Web. 17 Aug. 2016.()
- Indian Journal of Physics
- India's Who's Who - 1992: Page 393 (Google Books: India Who's who)
- THE GREAT DIGITAL TRANSFORMATION by Dr. D K Ghosh (pages 85–86)
- Business News Today: Read Latest Business news, India Business News Live, Share Market & Economy News
- INSAT: A damp squib
- 1982-Colour television is introduced: Out of the dark ages
