= Neelam Giri =

Indian pediatric hematologist/oncologist

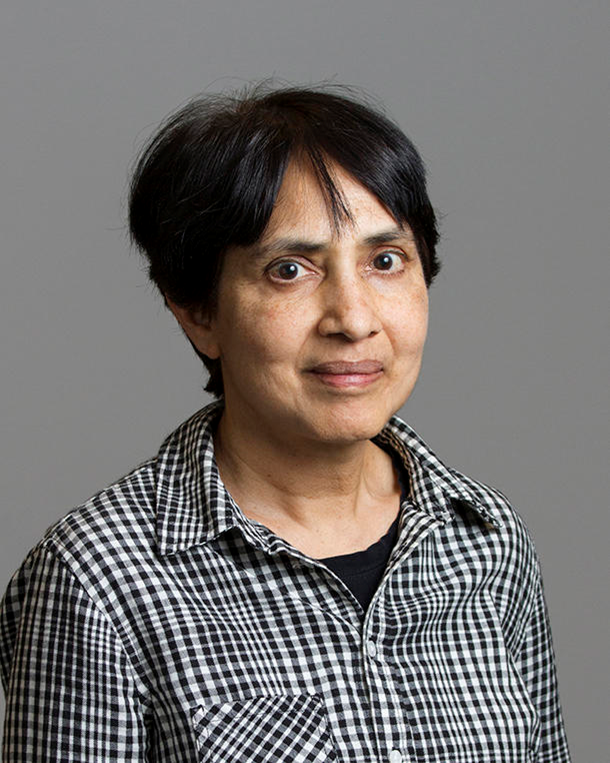
- Giri in 2015
- Education: University of Bombay
- Scientific career
- Fields: Pediatric hematology/oncology, bone marrow failure syndromes
- Workplaces: Alfred I. duPont Hospital for Children; National Cancer Institute

Neelam K. Giri is an Indian pediatric hematologist/oncologist and physician-scientist who researches bone marrow failure syndromes. She is a staff clinician in the clinical genetics branch at the National Cancer Institute.

== Life ==
Giri received her MBBS and MD degrees from the University of Bombay where she also received her initial training in general pediatrics and in pediatric hematology/oncology at Tata Memorial Cancer Center. She completed additional postdoctoral training at the Sydney Children's Hospital, the King Faisal Specialist Hospital and Research Centre, and the National Cancer Institute (NCI) pediatric oncology branch.

Giri was a staff physician in the blood and bone marrow transplantation unit of the Alfred I. duPont Hospital for Children. Giri is a staff clinician in the NCI clinical genetics branch. During her tenure at the NCI, Giri has worked in the stem cell biology laboratory of the National Heart, Lung, and Blood Institute (NHLBI) where her research interests included the biology inherited bone marrow failure syndromes such as Diamond–Blackfan anemia. She also conducts clinical and laboratory research focused on the various diseases which are being studied as part of this protocol, including Fanconi anemia, dyskeratosis congenita, Diamond–Blackfan anemia, and Shwachman–Diamond syndrome.

In January 2021, Giri was among the first National Institutes of Health (NIH) employees to receive a COVID-19 vaccine.

== See also ==
- List of University of Mumbai people
