= Vithal Balkrishna Gandhi =

Indian businessman and politician (1896–1969)

- Born: 11 November 1896
- Died: 3 November 1969 (aged 72)
- Occupations: social reformer, political leader and businessman

Vithal Balkrishna Gandhi (11 November 1896 – 3 November 1969), popularly known as "American Gandhi", was an Indian social reformer, political leader and businessman. The Dr. V.B. Gandhi Marg in Mumbai (Bombay) was named in his honour.

== Early life ==
V.B. Gandhi was born on 11 November 1896 to the family of a vegetable vendor. The Gandhi family belonged to a community called "Konkanastha Sangameshwari Vaishya Wani Samaj", a group of traders from the Konkan. Vithal's father Balkrishna Gandhi was a humble vegetable vendor from Ratnagiri. V.B. Gandhi was nicknamed "American Gandhi" because he returned to India to serve the masses after receiving education abroad.

== Education ==
V.B. Gandhi received his early education at Nago School based in Ratnagiri, while his family shifted to Pimpalwadi. V.B. Gandhi arrived in Mumbai in 1910 after being unable to continue his education at Nago Public school due to lack of funds. Later, he got admission to Wilson High School with sponsorship from philanthropic community elders. In 1913, Vithal completed his matriculation and secured a seat in Wilson College located on Marine Drive. Since the sponsorship did not cover college expenses, Vithal funded his college fees by tutoring other students. Later, V.B. Gandhi enrolled himself in Columbia University in 1919 for a master's degree in Economics, and completed his course in 1921.

During his student days, Gandhi undertook an editorial role for Young India, a journal founded by Lala Lajpat Rai. He also wrote for "The Willsonian" his college magazine.

== Personal life ==
Vithal was married to Dr. Susheela, who was his friend Dada Korgaonkar's sister. The two were introduced to each other by Dada Korgaonkar himself, and though Vithal was rejected by Susheela at first; they subsequently decided to marry each other in December 1929. Vithal and Susheela were parents to two children, son Arvind who was born in 1930 and daughter Leela who was born in 1933. Arvind Gandhi married Dr. Pamila and were parents of three daughters Leena Tewari, Sheela and Sunita. Leela Gandhi, Vithal's daughter married Vijay Gad, and they had a daughter, Beena.

In subsequent years, the Gandhi family's grandchildren married into different families; Leena Gandhi married Prashant Tewari, Sheela Gandhi married Keshav Rao and Sunita married Kartik Mani. The only daughter of Leela Gandhi and her husband Vijay Gad, Beena tied the knot with Ulhas Yargop.

V.B. Gandhi was a huge admirer of the pipe and was well versed on the subject. Vithal developed a great liking for the pipe as he saw it as a symbol of "democracy". He opined that the pipe was not only for the affluent but for all, as the pipe would pass from hand to hand without discriminating on any basis.

V.B. Gandhi had a very liberal view regarding the education of his children however; he was strictly in favour of his children being schooled in their mother tongue. He was highly supportive of his wife's career and encouraged her to pursue a career as a doctor. Vithal was known for his honesty and fair dealings. He was sent a watch, by his American creditors, as a mark of appreciation for his ethical conduct when he repaid each and every penny in spite of the Great Depression and misappropriation of funds within his own company. The watch had the names of each and every presenter etched on it, and was worn by Vithal all through his life like a badge. Vithal's work with the mill workers and other slum dwellers made him realise the importance of medicine and he made every effort through his business, to bring as many possible drugs to India in order to reduce rampant disease. During the late 1960s V.B. Gandhi's health began to deteriorate and was troubled by High Blood pressure with sporadic attacks of Angina. In June 1967, Vithal was to undergo a prostate gland operation but picked up an infection before the slated surgery. He also developed a rare skin condition, pemphigus, which gradually spread to his lungs developing pneumonia. V.B. Gandhi died on 3 November 1969 at the age of 73.

== Association with Amrit Rai and Lala Lajpat Rai ==
Chowpatty Beach became a hub of revolutionary meetings and ideas. Vithal Balkrishna Gandhi and his friends attended many such meetings. Vithal was affected by the teachings of Mahatma Gandhi, Lalalajpat Rai and other leaders. He had observed Lala Lajpat Rai from close quarters during his education years in the US when he served as a waiter at a restaurant which was frequented by Lala Lajpat Rai. Later when his son, Amrit Rai enrolled himself for a course in the U.S.A. he shared the apartment with Vithal and was readily accepted Lajpat Rai. Since then, V.B. Gandhi and Amrit Rai were nicknamed "The Inseparables" by other students as they often spent a lot of time together exploring the new campus.

== Career ==
V.B. Gandhi's initial business venture was an investment he made along with his friend, Shantilal Parekh, in the business of cashew imports which wiped out his entire savings and forced him to return to India. On his return, he began working as a professor at Wilson College. During the same time he continued his association with his friend Shantilal Parekh, and together they managed to secure contracts for trade in medical products and radio accessories. Due to expanding business the need to source more funds forced Vithal to travel overseas and raise necessary capital. Vithal and Parekh got their venture incorporated and named it "American Products Company Ltd.". This was one of the first corporations of India. Vithal travelled to the US for sourcing business for a period of one year and on his return he found misappropriation of company funds by Parekh. Parekh was made to exit the company and Vithal took the reins of the corporation into his own hands and paid off American creditors in the years to come. The company continued to grow and in 1932 acquired the agency for Atomidine from Sunker Bhisey. In 1933 many more agencies were acquired.

Vithal began to connect with other corporations to add to the list of agencies to his company. USV&P Inc. welcomed his queries and registered in India considerable number of patents including special medications for diabetes which were imported by American Products Company Ltd. With this V.B. Gandhi became the pioneer in India in field of unique pharmaceutical products. In 1942, V.B. Gandhi became a member of the Indian Merchants Chamber.

Soon after India achieved independence and V.B. Gandhi had helped in setting up a sound state transport system, his business began to focus on pharmaceuticals. In 1947, due to import restrictions and tight currency conversion norms, V.B. Gandhi requested USV&P Inc. to permit the manufacture of some of their products in India, which was however rejected at the time. The focus on pharmaceuticals had begun to emerge shaping the future of the company. Vithal's son Arvind joined his father in business in 1952. USV&P Inc. had proposed to send bulk containers of their medications to India, which would be packed into smaller packs by American Products Company Ltd. Later after much persuasion USV&P agreed to transfer technology for manufacturing to India. Gradually, Vithal and Arvind Gandhi established a manufacturing unit to manufacture USV&P Inc.’s products in India. In 1960, U.S. Vitamins & Pharmaceutical Corporation (India) Ltd. was incorporated with equal share holding between USV&P and the Gandhi family. V.B. Gandhi handed over the reins of the business to Arvind Gandhi in the year 1960.

== Political career and contribution ==
V.B. Gandhi had been an admirer of Lala Lajpat Rai and Mahatma Gandhi, but he found his loyalties divided when Rai decided to break away from the Congress Party. During the same time, the mill workers' condition had grabbed his attention and he continued his social work in this direction. In recognition of his social involvement with the workers, V.B. Gandhi was given and honorary title in the Congress Party of "Dr. V.B. Gandhi" by S.K. Patil, the chairperson of Bombay Provincial Congress Committee. He was an integral part of all the major nationalist movements by the Congress party during this time. Vithal was praised by Mahatma Gandhi for his active involvement with the mill workers association.

In 1938, V.B. Gandhi was offered a ticket for the BMC elections which he accepted. Vithal won the BMC elections in 1939. For the next 12 years, he managed his corporation and his political roles. Vithal served three terms at the BMC and of these three; twice he also chaired the committees. Outside the BMC, V.B. Gandhi chaired the committee for Public Transportation, was a member on the BEST and was the chairman of the Sewri Cotton Kamgar Union.

Vithal became extremely active in the Indian freedom struggle and continued to remain absent from the BMC meetings citing medical reasons as he was completely involved in the freedom movement and the secret meetings. Vithal helped communicate Mahatma Gandhi's message among the masses and opposed Jinnah's theory of a separate nation for the Muslim population.

Vithal was an advocate of encouraging foreign capital in India. Later, V.B. Gandhi aligned with Samyukta Maharashtra Samiti against the Congress party which demanded retaining Bombay in the state of Maharashtra. Vithal always upheld the fact that he was not against the Congress party, it was only that he had a different view on the matter of state reorganisation. Later during the second Lok Sabha elections, V.B. Gandhi, though an extremely strong candidate, politely turned down the ticket. On completing his assignment with the Public Accounts Committee, Vithal became a member of the Central Pay Commission.

Vithal was offered a ticket to the elections to the third Parliament, which he accepted. He was joined by is nephew Vasant Todkari. Vithal was representing the Congress party and emerged victorious. The third Parliament witnessed landmark events such as the demise of Pandit Jawaharlal Nehru, the rise of his daughter Indira Gandhi to the post of party president, war with Pakistan, Taskent agreement and the sudden demise of Prime Minister Lal Bahadur Shastri.

Vithal was often referred to as the "Gandhi from Ratnagiri" and was promised a seat in the Rajya Sabha by Pandit Jawahrlal Nehru. The promise was later honoured by Mrs Indira Gandhi. However, Vithal refused the seat due to deteriorating health. He had completed is term in the Lok Sabha and strongly disapproved of the growing infighting within the Congress party.

== Contribution to Mumbai (Bombay) ==
In the subsequent years of the BMC, V.B. Gandhi was actively involved in many projects as a municipal corporator. His major contributions were towards Vaitarna Dam, the takeover of BEST from the British and the execution of the State Transport networks. Vithal realised the importance of good transport for the common man and was instrumental in the take-over of BEST from the British in 1948. A statutory body of nine persons was appointed, of which Vithal was one, to manage the affairs of the BEST. Analysing the problems of Sewri, Vithals’ own constituency, where workers had no mode of transport to return to their villages, he proposed a well-researched and detailed network for state transportation. The recommendations were eventually incorporated and the State Transport buses were launched. Vithal was appointed Chairman of the Regional Transport Authority. His contribution to the transport system received praise from the state and central leaders.

In 1951, V.B. Gandhi became the unanimous choice for the Bombay mayor and was to succeed S.K. Patil who had held the office for the past two terms and was keen on a third. He requested Vithal to relinquish the offer which he gracefully accepted and turned down the offer to become Bombay's’ new Mayor. In lieu of this S.K. Patil had promised Vithal a ticket to contest the Lok Sabha election in 1952. Vithal was to contest elections from Bombay city, North. The region was a strong communist foothold and Vithal's victory came as a pleasant surprise to the entire party. V.B. Gandhi was a senior member of the Indian delegation for E.C.A.F.E. (Economic Conference for Asia and the Far East). It was Vithal who suggested that the Indian Taxi's should sport the colours of black and yellow so that people could easily identify them, the idea appealed to Jawaharlal Nehru and was put into effect. V.B. Gandhi was a respected Parliamentarian and was a regular invitee to Jawaharlal Nehru's birthday hosted at Teen Murti. Biographical Works

V.B Gandhi's 2013 biography was written by his granddaughter, Leena Gandhi Tewari, and titled Beyond Pipes and Dreams.
