= Kamlesh Shivji Vikamsey =

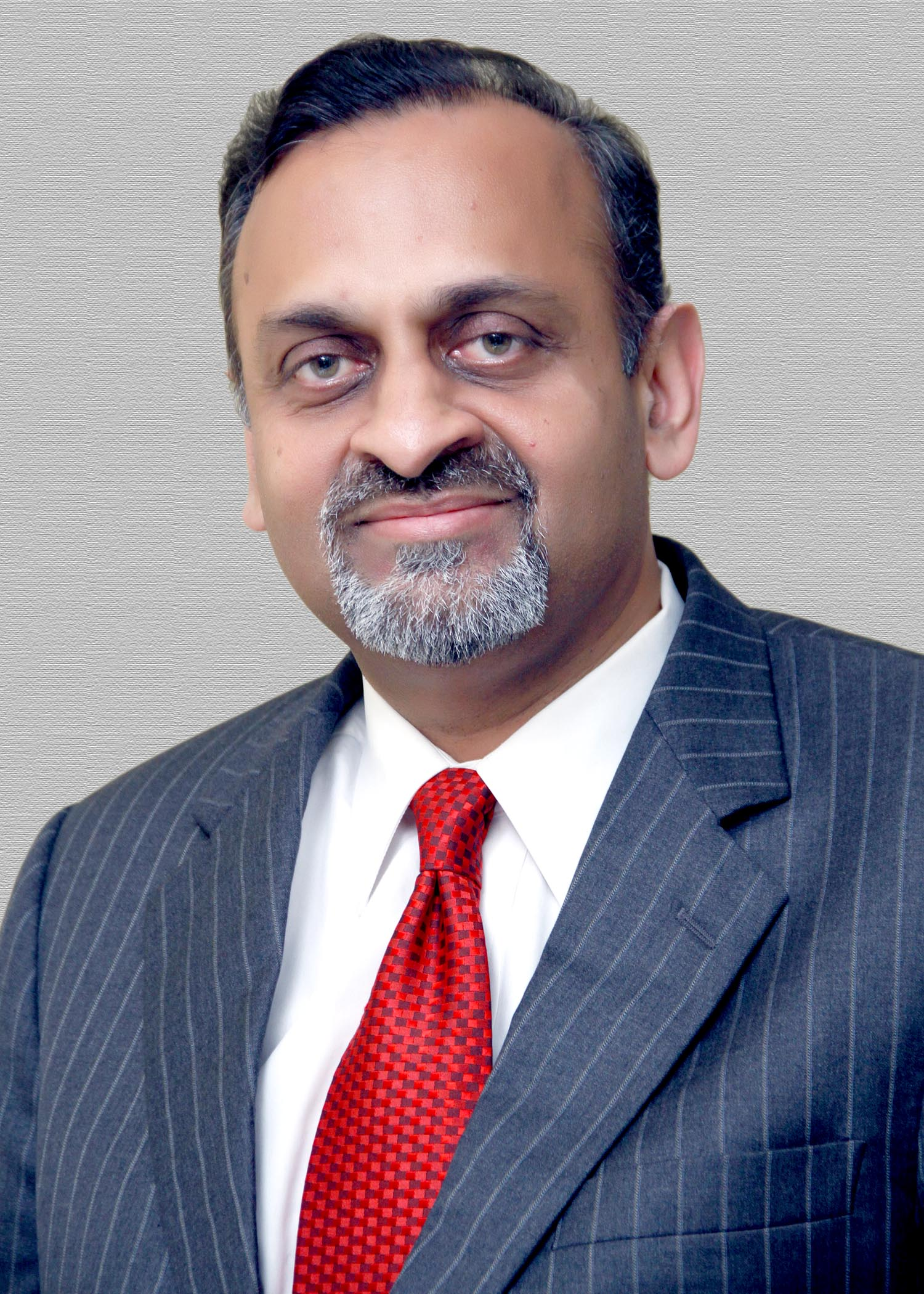
- Born: 6 December 1960; India
- Education: University of Mumbai; Podar College, Mumbai; Fellow Chartered Accountant
- Occupations: Senior Partner, KKC & Associates LLP (formerly Khimji Kunverji & Co LLP)
- Notable credit(s): Former president of ICAI & of CAPA
- Title: Chartered Accountant
- Father: Shivji K. Vikamsey
- Website: http://www.kkcllp.in

Kamlesh Shivji Vikamsey is an Indian Chartered Accountant and a Past President of Institute of Chartered Accountants of India (ICAI) and a Past President of The Confederation of Asian and Pacific Accountants (CAPA). He is an expert on governance and oversight; and has served in his personal capacity on several international organizations like UNDP, IMF, UNICEF, ITU and WMO in Audit and Oversight Committees.

== Childhood and education ==
Kamlesh was born in December 1960 in Mumbai in a family of highly educated people. His father, Mr.Shivji K. Vikamsey was a Chartered Accountant and a past member of the central council of ICAI. His younger brother, Mr.Nilesh Shivji Vikamsey is also a Chartered Accountant and was the past president of the ICAI.

He obtained B.Com degree from Mumbai University after studying in Podar College in 1981 and went on to become a Chartered Accountant in 1982.

== Profession ==
After obtaining CA qualification, Kamlesh started his public practice in the same year. He is the senior partner of the accounting firm, KKC & Associates LLP (formerly Khimji Kunverji & Co LLP), Mumbai.

== Positions held ==
=== In India ===
- ICAI: Kamlesh Vikamsey was elected to the Central Council of ICAI in 1998 and he remained as a Central Council Member till 2007. He was elected as its Vice President in 2004 and its President in 2005. He has also chaired various committees of the Institute.

Kamlesh & HE Dr. A. P. J. Abdul Kalam, President of India in ICAI International Conference at New Delhi.

- IRDA: He was member of The Standing Committee on Accounting Issues of Insurance Regulatory and Development Authority of India (IRDA)
- Appellate Authority: He was also the member of Appellate Authority constituted under section 22A of the Chartered Accountants Act, 1949.
- Directorships: Kamlesh is director in many prominent public sector and private sector companies. He is also Trustee and treasurer of Global Vipassana Foundation, an internationally renowned Trust, which has constructed Global Pagoda in Mumbai. The Global Pagoda is the World’s largest stone dome built without any supporting pillars. It is built combining ancient Indian and Modern Technology to enable it to last for at least 2000 years. He is appointed as a trustee of LIC Golden Jubilee Foundation, a charitable trust settled by Life Insurance Corporation of India.

=== International ===
- SAFA: Kamlesh was Chairman of Centre of Excellence on Education, Training and CPD of South Asian Federation of Accountants (SAFA – An Apex Body of SAARC) – 2004–2005.
- CAPA: He has also served as Deputy President - The Confederation of Asian and Pacific Accountants (CAPA) – 2005-2007 and as President of CAPA - 2007-2009 and Chairman of Strategic Committee of The Confederation of Asian and Pacific Accountants (CAPA) 2005-2007
- IFAC: He has also been a Board Member – International Federation of Accountants (IFAC) in 2005-2008 and also a member of Planning & Finance Committee of International Federation of Accountants (IFAC) 2006-2008
- UN: He was also a member of Steering Committee of United Nations for Comprehensive Review of Governance and Oversight within the United Nations, and its funds, programme and specialized agencies, appointed by then Secretary General of United Nations Mr.Kofi Annan - 2006
- UNDP: He was also the Chairperson of Audit Advisory Committee of the United Nations Development Programme (UNDP), New York City 1 July 2014 to 30 June 2015 & Member since 1 July 2010
- ITU: He is appointed as a member of Independent Management Advisory Committee (IMAC) of International Telecommunication Union (ITU), Geneva, Switzerland with effect from 1 January 2016 for a term of four years, further extended by four years. He is currently the Chairman of the Committee from January 2020
- IMF: He was appointed as a member of the External Audit Committee (EAC) of International Monetary Fund (IMF), Washington D.C., United States of America with effect from 1 November 2015 for a term of three years and as its Chairperson with effect from 1 November 2017
- UNICEF: He was appointed as a member of the Audit Advisory Committee (AAC) of United Nations Children's Fund (UNICEF), New York, United States of America for a term of three years in October 2016; further extended for a term of three years in October 2019. He was Chairman of the Committee from 2019
- WMO: He was appointed as member of the Audit Oversight Committee (AOC) of the World Meteorological Organization (WMO) from March 2019 for a term of three years; further extended for a term of three years from March 2022 to March 2025.
- UNFPA: He is appointed as member of the Independent Oversight Advisory Committee (OAC) of United Nations Population Fund (UNFPA), New York from July 2022 for a period of three years.
- WIPO: He is appointed as member of the Independent Advisory Oversight Committee (IAOC) of World Intellectual Property Organization (WIPO), Geneva from February 2023 for a period of three years.
