= Lila Poonawalla =

Indian industrialist, philanthropist, humanitarian

- Born: Lila Thadani; 16 September 1944 (age 81); Hyderabad, Sindh
- Occupations: Philanthropist; Industrialist
- Years active: 1967-
- Spouse: Firoz Poonawalla
- Awards: Padma Shri; Order of the Polar Star; Order of the Seraphim

Lila Firoz Poonawalla (born 16 September 1944) is an Indian industrialist, philanthropist, humanitarian and the founder of Lila Poonawalla Foundation, a non governmental organization.

Poonawalla is the former chairperson of Alfa Laval India and TetraPak India. She was awarded the fourth highest civilian award, the Padma Shri, by the Government of India in 1989.

== Biography ==
Lila Poonawalla, née Lila Thadani, was born on 16 September 1944 in Hyderabad in the Sindh region in British India as one of the five children in a Sindhi family. She lost her father when she was three years old and, during the partition of India, her family moved to India as refugees to settle in Pune. She did her early education in Pune after which she graduated in mechanical engineering with first class from the Government College of Engineering under the University of Pune in 1967.

She started her career as an apprentice at Ruston and Hornsby where she met with her future husband, Firoz Poonawalla, who was from a Dawoodi Bohra family and was working in the same company. As the company rules prohibited the members of the same family working together, she moved, as a trainee engineer, to the Indian division Alfa Laval, the Swedish multinational, where she worked in various positions to rise to hold the office of the chairperson in a span of two decades, thus becoming one of the first woman CEOs in India. During her career, she pursued management studies at the Indian Institute of Management, Ahmedabad, Harvard University and Stanford University. Under her management, Alfa Laval India operations grew from ₹500 million to ₹2.5 billion and eventually she took over the TetraPak operations in India as its chief executive officer, serving the companies till her retirement in 2001. Poonawalla couple have no children and live in Pune where Firoz Poonawalla has based his floriculture export business.

== Legacy and positions ==
Poonawalla has been associated with the Government of India by serving as a member of the Scientific Advisory Committee, when A. P. J. Abdul Kalam served as its chairman, the Herbal and Floritech Sub-Committee of the Scientific Advisory Committee to the Government and the Technology Information Forecasting & Assessment Council (TIFAC) of the Department of Science and Technology. Her association with the education sector included the memberships of the Core Group of the University Grants Commission, the academic councils of Pune University, Jawaharlal Nehru University and Symbiosis Management Institute, the steering committee of Pune Vyaspeeth, the Science and Technology Park of Pune University and the governing council of the Centre for Development of Advanced Computing. She has served as a member of the executive council of the Confederation of Indian Industry and has held the chair of the Food Task Force of the association. She was the founder chairperson of the Indo-Swiss Vocational Training Trust and was involved in the establishment of the International Biotech Park in Pune as a member of the sub group on conceptualization. She is also a former member of the advisory committee of the Life Insurance Corporation of India.

== Lila Poonawalla Foundation ==
Lila Poonawalla Foundation, a Nonprofit Public Charitable Trust, was established in 1995 by Mrs. Lila Poonawalla and Mr. Firoz Poonawalla. LPF works towards the cause of promoting Girls Education and Women Empowerment by offering Merit-cum-Need based Scholarship and Skill Building programs. LPF is accredited by the Credibility Alliance.

== Awards and honours ==
Poonawalla has been awarded several minor and major awards, including two State Awards such as the civilian honour of the Padma Shri from the Government of India in 1989.

== See also ==
- List of Indian businesswomen
