= Ramniranjan Anandilal Podar College of Commerce and Economics =

College of Commerce and Economics in Mumbai

Ramniranjan Anandilal Podar College of Commerce and Economics (Autonomous)
- Other name: Podar College
- Type: A+
- Established: 1942; 84 years ago
- Academic affiliations: University of Mumbai
- Principal: Vinita K. Pimpale
- Undergraduates: B.Com., B.M.S., B.B.A. (Shipping and Logistics Management), B.Sc. (Data Science and Analytics), B.Com.(Actuarial Studies), B.Com. (Financial Markets)
- Postgraduates: M.Com.(Accountancy), M.Com. (Business Management), M.Com. (Behavioural Finance), M.Com. (Business Analytics), M.Com (International Business)
- Location: Matunga, Mumbai, India
- Website: www.rapodar.ac.in

Rāmniranjan Ānandilāl Podār College of Commerce and Economics (Autonomous), popularly known as R.A. Podar College is affiliated with the University of Mumbai, situated in Matunga, Mumbai, India. It is run by the Shikshan Prasarak Mandali, also called the S.P. Mandali, which has its headquarters at Pune. The college offers courses in commerce for undergraduate and postgraduate degrees, additionally the affiliated Wellingkar Institute of Management and Research, now WE School, offers postgraduate degrees and postgraduate diplomas in management. The college also offers Ph.D programmes.

== History ==
In 1941, a prominent Marwari Industrialist Seth Rāmdeoji Ānandilāl Podār provided funds of one hundred and fifty thousand rupees—a substantial sum in those times—for establishing the College in the memory of his brother, Rāmniranjan Ānandilāl Podār, giving the charge of running the college to the Shikshan Prasārak Mandali. The College was the first private (non-government) commerce college to be started in Mumbai.

The College started to offer B.Com. degree course in 1942. The first batch of students at Podar College consisted of 150 students. There were just three classrooms and a small staff of competent teachers. Gradually, the number of class rooms increased. The main hall and the library appeared in 1947–48. In 1949, the college started providing some of the teaching and administrative staff with quarters, and students with hostel facilities.

The College received its affiliation with the then University of Bombay (now University of Mumbai) in 1950.

== Accolades ==
The National Assessment and Accreditation Council (NAAC) of India has awarded an A+ rating to Podar College. Students of Podar College have excelled in academics as attested to by the Head of Academic Performance.

Podar College has been one of the pioneers in conceiving the idea of rural camps in various ādiwāsi villages under the auspices of the College National Social Service Unit (NSS). After graduation from Podar College, inspired NSS Volunteers continue their service under the auspices of Sankalp and Nirmiti Youth Foundation. The volunteers work in the villages of Barānpur near Pālghar, and Chandip and Shivansai near Vajreshwari. The NCC Unit of Podar College endorses the phrase Small is beautiful.

== Infrastructure ==
The campus area of Podar College encompasses 27,000 square feet (2,500 square meters). The college building occupies 54,594 square feet (5,055 square meters), and has three wings, each wing consisting of four floors.

The library has a collection of over 60,000 books, including reference books, magazines, and journals, and it occupies the rear wing of the second floor; the third floor above the library forms the reading hall. The library offers the facility of a book bank. The Central Computer Laboratory is equipped with 50 PCs. An Audio Visual Room is attached to the library.

== Vocational courses offered ==
Two vocational courses are offered as an integral part of the B.Com. course:

- Computer Applications, and
- Travel and Tourism Management

Vocational courses offered as an integral part of junior college include:

- Marketing and Salesmanship.
- Office Management.

== Cultural activities ==
- Student's Council
- Artist's Guild & Youth Festival (The Artist's Guild promotes performing arts through several inter-collegiate talent competitions and cultural programs. The Youth Festival participates in inter-collegiate cultural competitions. Podar college has distinguished itself by winning the Youth Festival Trophy 16 times since its inception. University of Mumbai has awarded Podar College the Best College Award.
- The Annual Inter-Collegiate festival 'Enigma' hosts over 100 colleges.
  - The Theme for the 2007 event was 'Enigma Echoes'
  - The Theme of Enigma 2013 was "Time Machine"
  - The Theme of Enigma 2017 was "Enigma Appstract"
  - The Theme of Enigma 2018 was "Enigma Escapade"
  - The Theme of Enigma 2019 was "Enigma Excelsior"
  - The theme for Enigma 2020 was "Enigma Enchancia"
- 'RAPPORT' (R. A. Podar's Platform of Rising Talent) is the intra-collegiate festival where different divisions from each standard contest over 40 events.
  - The Theme for the 2008 event was 'Rapport Rang De'
  - The Theme for the 2009 event was 'Rapport Rock N Rule'
  - The theme for Rapport 2010 was 'Rapport Royale'.
  - The theme for the 2016 event was 'Rapport Rangrez'.
  - The theme for Rapport 2017 was 'Rapport Rajneeti'.
  - The theme for Rapport 2018 was 'Rapport Riyasat'.
  - The theme for Rapport 2019 was 'Rapport Realize'.
  - The theme for Rapport 2022 was 'Rapport Rahasya'.
- 'Rostrum Spectrum' is an inter-collegiate literary festival. The event witnesses the participation of more than 60 colleges from Mumbai.
  - The Theme for the 2009 event was 'Rostrum Spectrum - The Renaissance'.
- An annual national level financial-markets festival, 'Moneta', is also held by the college, which aims at development of the financial knowledge of aspiring students.

MONETA

  - The Theme for Moneta 2018 was 'Alchemy of Finance'.
  - The Theme for Moneta 2017 was 'Adapt. Evolve. Conquer'.
  - The Theme for Moneta 2019 was 'Decoding the Dynamics of Finance'.

== Alumni ==
Art, Culture and Entertainment:

Sunny Deol - Actor

Shilpa Shetty - Actress

Rohit Gupta - Film director

Mahalakshmi Iyer - Indian singer

Akshay Mhatre

Phulwa Khamkar - Indian dancer

Amruta Pawar

Astad Deebo - Indian dancer and Choreographer

Uday Tikekar - Marathi Actor

Government Service and Politics:

Ramesh Chandra Lahoti - Former Chief Justice of India

Gurudas Kamat - Indian Politician

Vipul Makwana - Advocate, Bombay High Court

SPORTS

CRICKET -

Farokh Engineer - Indian Cricketer

Rohan Gavaskar - Indian Cricketer

Ravi Shastri - Indian Cricketer & former head coach

Dilip Vengsarkar - Indian Cricketer

Sanjay Manjrekar - Indian Cricketer

Shreyas Iyer - Indian Cricketer

Gundibail Sunderam - Indian Cricketer

Shishir Hattiangadi - Indian Cricketer

Alan Sippy - Indian Cricketer

Sairaj Bahutule - Indian Cricketer

Jatin Paranjape - Indian Cricketer

Abhijit Kale - Indian Cricketer

TABLE TENNIS -

Kamlesh Mehta - Indian table tennis player

S. Sridhar - Indian table tennis player

S. Sriram - Indian table tennis player

S. Ramaswamy - Indian table tennis player

Vilas Menon - Indian table tennis player

Vyoma Shah - Indian table tennis player

BASKETBALL -

Gurudutt Nayak - Indian basketball player

Sridhar - Indian basketball player

Sheshan - Indian basketball player

Nitin - Indian basketball player

Ganesh - Indian basketball player

Business and Private Sector:

Vishal Gondal - Indian businessman

Sanjay Vakharia - Founder of Spykar

Kamlesh Shivji Vikamsey - Chartered Accountant

.

== The Podar Group ==
Besides Rāmniranjan Ānandilāl Podār College of Commerce and Economics, the Podār Group supports Ānandilāl Podār High School, Rāmniranjan Podār High School, and Lilāvati Bāi Podār High School.
