= Lalita D. Gupte =

Indian banker

Lalita D. Gupte, Joint Managing Director of ICICI Bank (India's second largest commercial bank), until 31 October 2006, is an important figure in India's banking and financial services sector. An INSEAD alumnus, Gupte was listed by the Fortune "as one of the fifty most powerful women in international business." She is currently the chairperson on the Board of ICICI Venture and a board member of Nokia Corporation. On 22 June 2010 she was appointed as member of Alstom's board of directors.

== Career ==
Recruited directly from the Mumbai-based Jamnalal Bajaj Institute of Management Studies, Gupte had begun her career with ICICI Ltd (which later merged with ICICI Bank) in 1971 as a trainee in the Project Appraisal department. She served in different locations and capacities, and had played a pivotal role in the listing of ICICI share in the New York Stock Exchange (NYSE) – the first Indian enterprise to be listed in NYSE, and the second Asian Bank to do so. Gupte was made Joint Managing Director of ICICI Bank in 2001, and at the same time was made in-charge of the Bank's growing international operations. In May 2007 Gupte was named to the board of the Finnish mobilephone giant Nokia.

== Contributions ==
Her contributions have been widely recognized, and the awards conferred on her include the following:

- The twenty First Century for Banking Finance and Banking award (1997) by Ladies Wing of the Indian Merchants' Chamber
- The Women Achievers Award (2001) from the Women graduates' Association.
- Women of the Year Award (2002) by the International Women's' Association.
