= Saundarya Rajesh =

Indian businesswoman

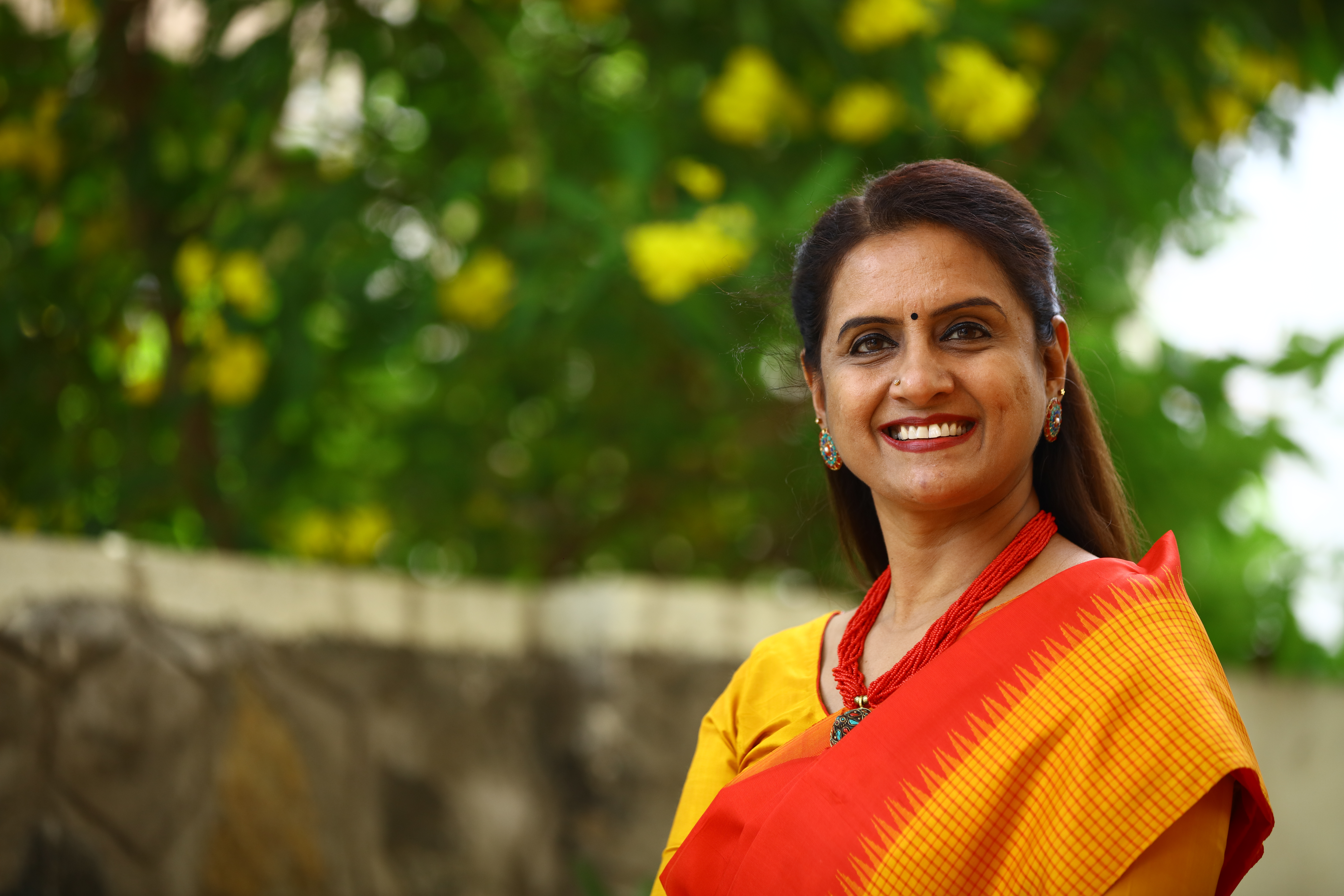
- Born: 1968 (age 57–58); Bangalore, India
- Education: University of Madras; Pondicherry School of Management
- Occupations: Entrepreneur, Founder-president of Avtar Group
- Organization(s): Avtar Group; Bruhat Insights Global; Avtar Human Capital Trust; Project Puthri
- Notable work: The 99 Day Diversity Challenge (2018); Conversations with the Career Doctor (2024)
- Spouse: V. Rajesh
- Children: 2

Saundarya Rajesh (born 1968) is an Indian entrepreneur who is the founder and president of Avtar Group. She is known for her efforts in promoting second career opportunities for women in the corporate sector in India. She runs Project Puthri, an initiative to empower underprivileged girls to secure employment. She was awarded the ‘100 Women Achievers of India’ in 2016 by the Minister of Women and Child Development for her work. She received the Women Transforming India Award from the NITI Aayog and the United Nations in 2016.

She is the author of two books, The 99 Day Diversity Challenge: Creating an Inclusive Workplace (2018) and Conversations with the Career Doctor: Women Thriving and Winning at Work (2024), both published by Penguin Random House.

== Early life and education ==
She holds a degree in English literature from Madras University and later pursued an MBA at the Pondicherry School of Management. In 2005, she received Chevening Scholarship, funded by the United Kingdom's Foreign and Commonwealth Office and was also selected by the US government for International Visitor Leadership Program (IVLP). Later, she completed her PhD in women's workforce participation.

== Career ==
Saundarya started her career with Citibank in 1990. She took a break from her career on becoming a mother. She later worked as a producer and compere for All India Radio and Doordarshan between 1992 and 1995, after which she was a part-time lecturer at MOP Vaishnav College for Women in Chennai between 1996 and 2003.

In 2000, Saundarya Rajesh established Avtar Career Creators, which was rebranded in 2011 as Flexi Careers India Limited. Avtar is now a firm focused on diversity, equity, and inclusion (DEI) in India. In 2005, she launched Avtar I-Win to assist women returning to work after a career break. This platform has since evolved into MyAvtar.com, a job portal aimed at women and other under-represented groups. In 2008, Saundarya founded Avtar Human Capital Trust, a not-for-profit organization working towards economic empowerment of women.

She runs an initiative called Project Puthri, which aims to create Career Intentionality among underprivileged girl students between the age group 13 to 18. Another initiative she runs is MITR (Men Impacting Trust & Respect), which educates and empowers boys from classes IX to XII to become inclusive and empathetic towards females.

In 2019, she gave a TEDx talk on the topic of Second Careers for Women – Re-innervating an important resource, in which she emphasizes the importance of women's participation in the Indian workforce through a series of anecdotes and research.

== Published works ==
In 2018, Saundarya Rajesh published her debut book, The 99 Day Diversity Challenge: Creating an Inclusive Workplace, through Penguin Random House. The book explores diversity and inclusion, offering practical insights for business leaders and professionals through stories and anecdotes. Sarika Chavan of Reputation Today reviewed the book and recommended it, particularly to leaders and executives, noting that it offers a perspective that extends beyond traditional discussions on diversity. The book received the First Prize at the ISTD Book Award for 2020–21, awarded by the Indian Society for Training & Development (ISTD).

Her second book, Conversations with the Career Doctor, was published by Penguin Random House in April 2024. The book provides guidance for Indian women professionals on topics such as work-life integration, technical skill-building, personal branding, and financial acumen. Excerpts from Conversations with the Career Doctor were published in The Hindu Business Line and Livemint.

== Awards and recognition ==
She was awarded the ‘100 Women Achievers of India’ in 2016 by the President of India. In 2016, NITI Aayog, the public policy think tank and the United Nations gave her a "Women Transforming India award". In March 2019, on the occasion of International Women's Day, Saundarya was awarded the WebWonderWomen Award by the Ministry of Women and Child Development in collaboration with Twitter India. The award was presented by Maneka Gandhi, the Union Minister of Women and Child Development. Femina included Saundarya Rajesh in its "Femina Fab 40" list of 2022. In 2023, she was awarded the 'Contribution to Society' Award by The Hindu as part of their 'World of Women' series.

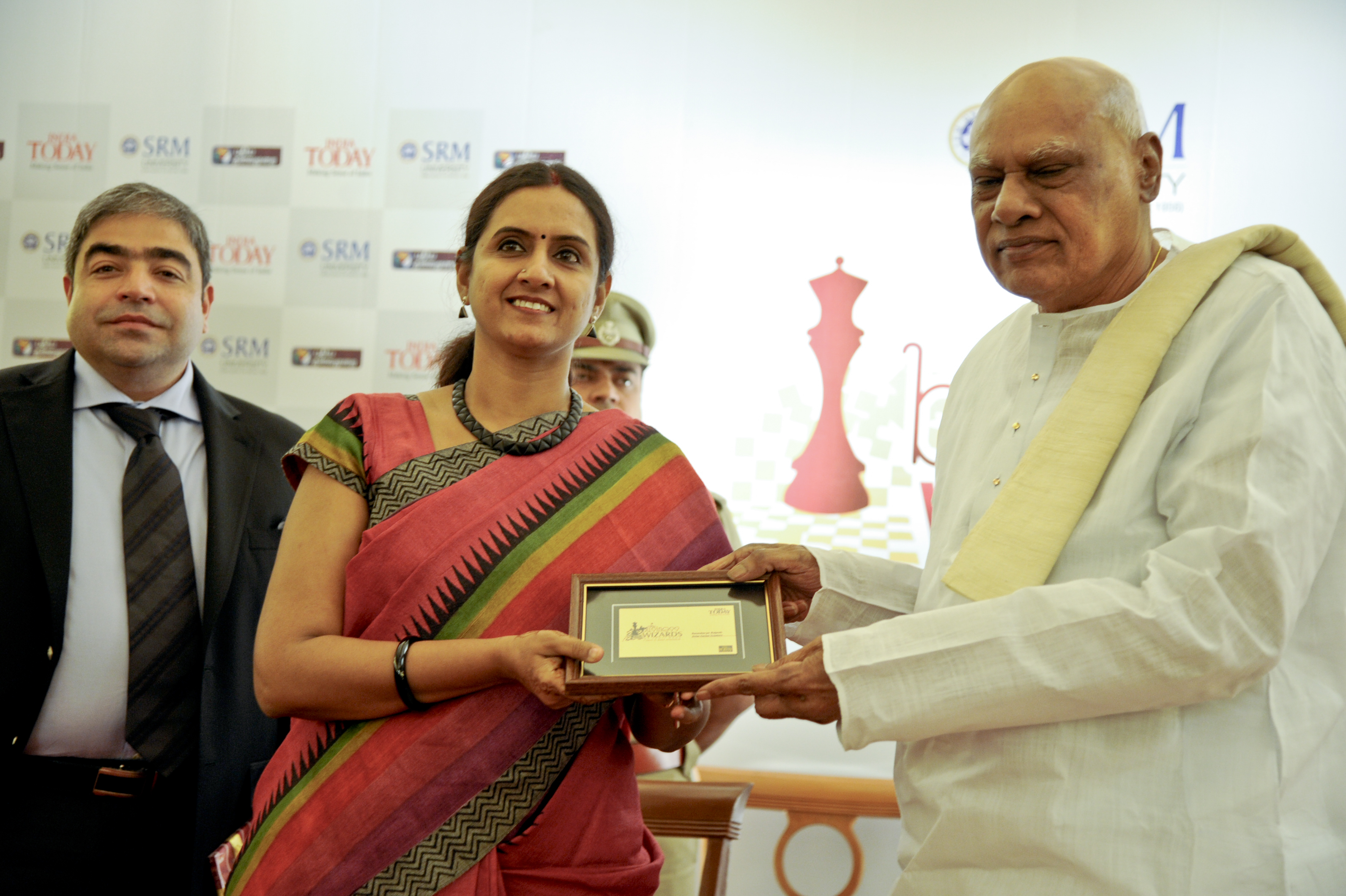
Saundarya Rajesh receiving the India Today Business Wizards Award from the 13th Governor of Tamil Nadu, Konijeti Rosaiah, in November 2011.

She has received many other awards such as:

- 2019: Winds of Change Award in the individual category conferred by The Forum on Workplace Inclusion, University of St. Thomas, Minnesota, USA
- 2019: Selected in the list of 35 Chevening Changemakers by the UK-government-funded Chevening Scholarship
- 2019: Chennai Carnatic Women Empowerment Award by the Rotary Club of Chennai Carnatic.
- 2014: Naturals Extraordinary Woman Award on the International Women's Day.
- 2012: FICCI FLO Woman Entrepreneur of the year award for building and creating India's first women's careers service.
- 2011: TiE Stree Shakti, entrepreneur of the year award.
- 2011: India Today's Business Wizards Award
- 2011: The CavinKare Chinnikrishnan Innovation Awards
- 2007: The Yuvashakthi Woman Entrepreneur Award
- 2006: The Standard Chartered SCOPE Woman Exemplar Award

== Personal life ==
She is married to V. Rajesh, whom she met at business school. They have two children, a son and a daughter. She resides in Chennai, India.

== See also ==
- List of Indian businesswomen
