= Shikshan Prasarak Mandali =

Maharashtran private educational society

The Shikshan Prasarak Mandali, Pune, is one of the private educational societies in Maharashtra. It was established in 1883 with the aim of imparting western education in Marathi language but without any help from the then British government. The Nutan Marathi Vidyalaya (NuMaVi) was established by this society in the same year in the memory of Marathi writer and scholar Vishnushastri Chiplunkar. In 1916 it went on to establish the New Poona College (later named as Sir Parshurambhau College) for arts.

Lokmanya Tilak, Gopalkrishna Gokhale, N. C. Kelkar and Datto Vaman Potdar were closely associated with its rapid growth and development.

== Institutes ==
The society runs about 40 educational institutions in Maharashtra and Karnataka.

- Nutan Marathi Vidyalaya, Pune (est. 1883)
- Sir Parshurambhau College, Pune (est. 1916)
- Haribhai Deokaran High School, Solapur (est. 1918)
- Tilak College of Education, Pune (est. 1941)
- Ramnarain Ruia College, Mumbai (est. 1937)
- Ramniranjan Anandilal Podar College of Commerce and Economics, Mumbai
- WE School, Mumbai (est. 1977)
- S.P.M. English Medium School, Pune
- S.P.M. Public English Medium School, Pune (est. 2010)
