= D. G. Ruparel College of Arts, Science and Commerce =

Undergraduate college in Maharashtra, India

Location
- Senapati Bapat Marg, Opposite Matunga Road Railway Stn. Matunga, Mumbai 400016. Maharashtra; India
- 19.028042°N 72.845149°E

Information
- Type: Public
- Motto: For the spread of light
- Established: 1952; 74 years ago
- Principal: Dr. Dilip S. Maske
- Vice Principal: Dr. Vaishali Jawlekar Prof. Dr. Krishnakant Waghmode
- Grades: NAAC 'B+' grade
- Campus: Urban
- Affiliations: University of Mumbai; Maharashtra State Board of Secondary and Higher Secondary Education
- Website: ruparel.edu

Doongasree Gangji Ruparel College of Arts, Science and Commerce, known as Ruparel College, is an undergraduate college in Matunga, Mumbai, Maharashtra, India. It is run by the Modern Education Society, Pune and is affiliated with the University of Mumbai.

== History ==
Doongasree Gangji Ruparel College, simply known as Ruparel College, was founded in 1952 by the Modern Education Society, Pune and endowed by businessman Doongasree Gangji Ruparel. The campus is located in Matunga, a suburb of Mumbai known for educational institutes. It offers undergraduate and graduate degrees, including PhD programs in Botany, Chemistry, Physics, and Zoology. With an enrollment of around 1,500 students, the campus features professional landscaping, including a botanical garden.

Ruparel College has been visited by several historical figures, including Indira Gandhi, Neelam Sanjiva Reddy (former President of India), P.C. Alexander (former governor of Maharashtra), and Ram Kapse (former Lt. Governor of the Andaman and Nicobar Islands).

== Certifications ==
In its most recent assessment in 2010, Ruparel College was certified as an A grade college, indicating an institutional score of 85–90 on a 100-point scale, by the National Assessment and Accreditation Council of India. Ruparel College has 64 permanent teachers and 23 ad-hoc teachers. Of its permanent teachers, 22 hold PhD degrees. Several faculty members are engaged in research in economics, English, philosophy, psychology, chemistry, botany, physics, mathematics, and zoology.

== Accomplishments ==
Ruparel attracted attention when it began producing a string of merit list winners beginning in the early 1980s. In 2005, three of the top ten student merit list winners and three of the top ten faculty merit list winners for the Maharashtra State Mumbai division were from Ruparel.

The school has a reputable sports program and has produced several winners of the Arjuna award and the Chhatrapati Shivaji Award, and several cricket stars. It also has strong extracurricular programmes in chess and yoga, and its junior Kho Kho team has won the state trophy 17 times.

The college NCC Unit has an equally prestigious history. The unit is attached to the 3 Mah Bn NCC and has produced over 40 NCC cadets who went on to join the Indian Armed Forces.

== Initiatives ==
The D. G. Ruparel College has been known for pioneering several initiatives over the years. The college was one of the first in India to provide a Women's Development Cell, to focus on providing support specifically for female students and faculty. In January 2011, it initiated the 'Chai and Why' sessions in association with the Tata Institute of Fundamental Research Mumbai on the lines of Café Scientifique in order to make science interesting and accessible to the general public. Later that year, the college became the first one in Mumbai to introduce ICT (information and communication technology) in daily learning and teaching, by allowing its students to take online topic-wise tests and using online software to show different experiments in science courses.

== Notable alumni ==
- Viral Acharya (RBI Deputy Governor)
- Aishwarya Rai (Actress, second year onwards)
- Kaushal Inamdar (Music Composer, Author, Speaker)
- Ajit Agarkar (Cricketer)
- Shivani Baokar (Actress)
- Amol Dighe (Scientist)
- Anil Kakodkar (Scientist)
- Antara Mali (Actress)
- Ankush Chaudhari (Actor)
- Apurva Nemlekar (Actor)
- Ashok Hande (Producer, Performer)
- Disha Vakani (Actress)
- Mugdha Chaphekar (Actress)
- Rajani Pandit (Detective)
- Ram Kapse (Politician and Lt Governor of Andaman and Nicobar Islands)
- Ramakant Desai (Cricketer)
- Ramesh Powar (Cricketer)
- Shridhar Phadke (Musician)
- Siddharth Jadhav (Actor)
- Suresh Prabhu (Minister of Railways (India))
- Suchitra Bandekar (Actress)
- Urmila Matondkar (Actress)
- Sonarika Bhadoria (Actress)
- Sumeet Raghavan (Actor)
- Ajit Parab (Music composer)
- Atul Parchure (Actor)
- Sharvari (Actress)
- Seema Shinde (Actress)
- Alizeh Agnihotri (Actress)
