= Suresh Kumar (government official) =

American government official

- Born: February 1955 (age 70); Secunderabad, India
- Education: Delhi University (B.A. in Economics), Jamnalal Bajaj Institute of Management Studies (MBA), Thunderbird International Consortium Program
- Occupation(s): Trade official, news anchor
- Known for: Assistant Commerce Secretary for Trade Promotion, Director-General of the U.S. Foreign Commercial Service by President Barack Obama

Suresh Kumar is an American government official and business leader. Born in February 1955 in Secunderbard, India, he spent his early years in Delhi, where he attended St. Columba's School. He earned a bachelor's degree in Economics from Delhi University and an MBA from the Jamnalal Bajaj Institute of Management Studies. Kumar began his career as a news and sports anchor on national television in India from 1970 to 1985.

== Career ==
In the private sector, Kumar served on the Group Operating Committee at Johnson & Johnson and as Vice President of Consumer Products for Latin America at Warner Lambert Pfizer. He also founded KaiZen Innovation, a management consulting firm, and served as a special advisor to the Clinton Foundation, working on economic development projects in Sub-Saharan Africa.
