= Smriti Nagpal =

Indian Social Entrepreneur

- Born: 1990 or 1991 (age 34–35)
- Occupations: Television presenter Social entrepreneur
- Years active: 2010–present
- Title: CEO and founder of Atulyakala
- Spouse: Saurav Bhadauria

Smriti Nagpal is an Indian television presenter, sign language interpreter, and social entrepreneur. She worked for the Doordarshan network where she presented the morning news bulletin for the hearing impaired. She is the founder of Atulyakala, an organisation promoting deaf education and awareness of sign language. Nagpal has also co-founded the Hearken Café in Shahpur Jat, which is run by deaf employees. She is an advocate of Indian Sign Language. Nagpal was included in the BBC's 100 Women series in 2015, in the "30 Under 30" entrepreneur category, In 2016, Nagpal received the Nelson Mandela – Graça Machel Innovation Award in the Youth Category, presented at International Civil Society Week in Bogotá, Colombia.

== Biography ==
Nagpal joined the National Association of the Deaf at age 16 in response to her two older siblings who were hearing impaired. After getting her business administration degree, she landed a job with the state-run Doordarshan network as a news anchor where she was responsible for their hearing-impaired news bulletins.

Nagpal founded Atulyakala at the age of 22. The company has a mix of deaf and hearing employees who communicate with each other using Indian Sign Language. They sell products designed by deaf artists, works on design projects for publishing houses and conducts events to spread awareness about sign language.

Nagpal co-founded the Hearken Café in Shahpur Jat with her cousin Virat in November 2016. Its name taken from an ancient English word meaning "to listen", the café serves European cuisine. The café's servers are deaf or mute and communicate in sign language. Additionally, free sign language classes are held in the café, along with events such as mime acts.
