= S. K. Venkataranga =

S. K. Venkatranga Iyengar (1900–1989) was an Indian lawyer. He lived in Gandhinagar, Bangalore.

== Life ==
Venkatranga Iyengar obtained his B.A. from the University of Mysore, and a law degree from the University of Mumbai. He was selected for the Indian Civil Service, however failed to attend a required interview in the UK. Venkataranga was offered an administrative post in the state of Baroda. Venkataranga declined the offer, opting instead for a career practicing law in the Mysore High Court. This position allowed Venkatranga to remain legally in Bangalore.

Venkatranga Iyengar was associated with the Indian Independence movement and chauffeured Gandhi in his visit to Karnataka cities.

== Career ==
Venkatranga declined elevation to judgeship in Mysore High Court and subsequently took up constitutional matters in the Supreme Court of India. He fought many "writ of mandamus" cases to get justice for public servants and admission to students who were denied their rights due to reservation policy after independence. He was a member of the Constituent assembly for Mysore state.

He was a member of the Bangalore city corporation with his uncle and grandfather. He was responsible for getting the Hebbar Srivaishnava Sabha their premises in Gandhinagar in the early 1930s.

He fought to resolve the disputes in the Melkote shrine between Thenkalai and Vadakalai priests and was a devout worshipper at Biligirirangaswamy Temple in Biligirirangan Hills and Venugopala Krishna in Malleswaram temple.

== See also ==
- Hebbar Iyengar
