= Narsee Monjee College of Commerce and Economics =

Constituent college of the University of Mumbai

Narsee Monjee College of Commerce and Economics, Mumbai
- Motto in English: Excellence in Education
- Type: Private
- Established: 1964; 62 years ago
- Affiliations: NAAC; University of Mumbai; Maharashtra State Board of Secondary and Higher Secondary Education
- President: Amrish Patel
- Principal: Parag Ajagaonkar
- Students: 6,000+
- Location: Mumbai, Maharashtra, India
- Campus: Urban
- Colours: Air Force Blue; Pearl White
- Website: www.nmcollege.in

Narsee Monjee College of Commerce and Economics (NMCCE) is a premier private college for commerce and economics located in Vile Parle, Mumbai, Maharashtra, India. Established in 1964, the college is affiliated with the University of Mumbai and is managed by the Shri Vile Parle Kelavani Mandal (SVKM), a charitable trust aimed at promoting quality education. It offers undergraduate, postgraduate, and doctoral programmes in commerce, management, and economics, and has consistently ranked among the top commerce institutions in India. It was awarded a re-accreditation 'A' grade and 3.42 GPA in the first cycle assessment conducted by the National Assessment and Accreditation Council and has been granted autonomous status by the University Grants Commission (UGC).

The college follows the curriculum laid down by the University of Mumbai.

== Library ==
I. J. Patel library covers a total area of 7400 sq. ft. divided in two floors. The college has a library with a capacity of more than 300 students. The library is equipped with Wi-Fi connectivity, UGC Network Resource Center and OPAC (Online Public Access Catalogue). The library has an institutional membership of the British Council Library, Indian Commerce Association and Maharashtra Economic Development Council. The college keeps the library open Monday to Saturday from 7:00 a.m. until 7:00 p.m.

== Student life ==
The college has more than 20 active societies and clubs including Debate and Literary Society, The Economics Association, Planning Forum, Women Development Cell, Enactus etc., for students to gain necessary exposure in their chosen area of extra-circulars.

Apart from clubs and societies, the college annually holds festivals like Umang, Rotofest and Insight. Umang, being the college's cultural festival is tagged as the 'Asia's Fastest Growing College Fest' and attracts more than 50000 youths from all over the country. Insight is the business, finance and economics festival and holds business conclaves, international summits, workshops, seminars, etc.

== Notable alumni ==
- Nita Ambani, philanthropist and wife of Mukesh Ambani
- Priyanka Chaturvedi, politician and spokesperson, Shiv Sena
- Jyoti Deshpande, film producer
- Makarand Deshpande, film director
- Anita Dongre, fashion
- Paresh Ganatra, comedian/actor
- Anupama Gokhale, sportsperson
- Adarsh Gourav, actor
- Ashutosh Gowariker, film director
- Nirmal Jain, business tycoon
- Dilip Joshi, comedian/actor
- Twinkle Khanna, actor
- Aamir Khan, actor
- Kunal Khemu, actor
- Amaal Mallik, musician
- Yasin Merchant, sportsperson
- Arundathi Nag, theatre artist
- Paresh Rawal, actor/politician, Member of Parliament, Lok Sabha
- Vipul Shah, film director
- Anita Sood, sportsperson
- Deepak Tijori, director/actor
- Divyank Turakhia, business tycoon
