= Nitin Paranjpe =

Indian business executive (born 1963)

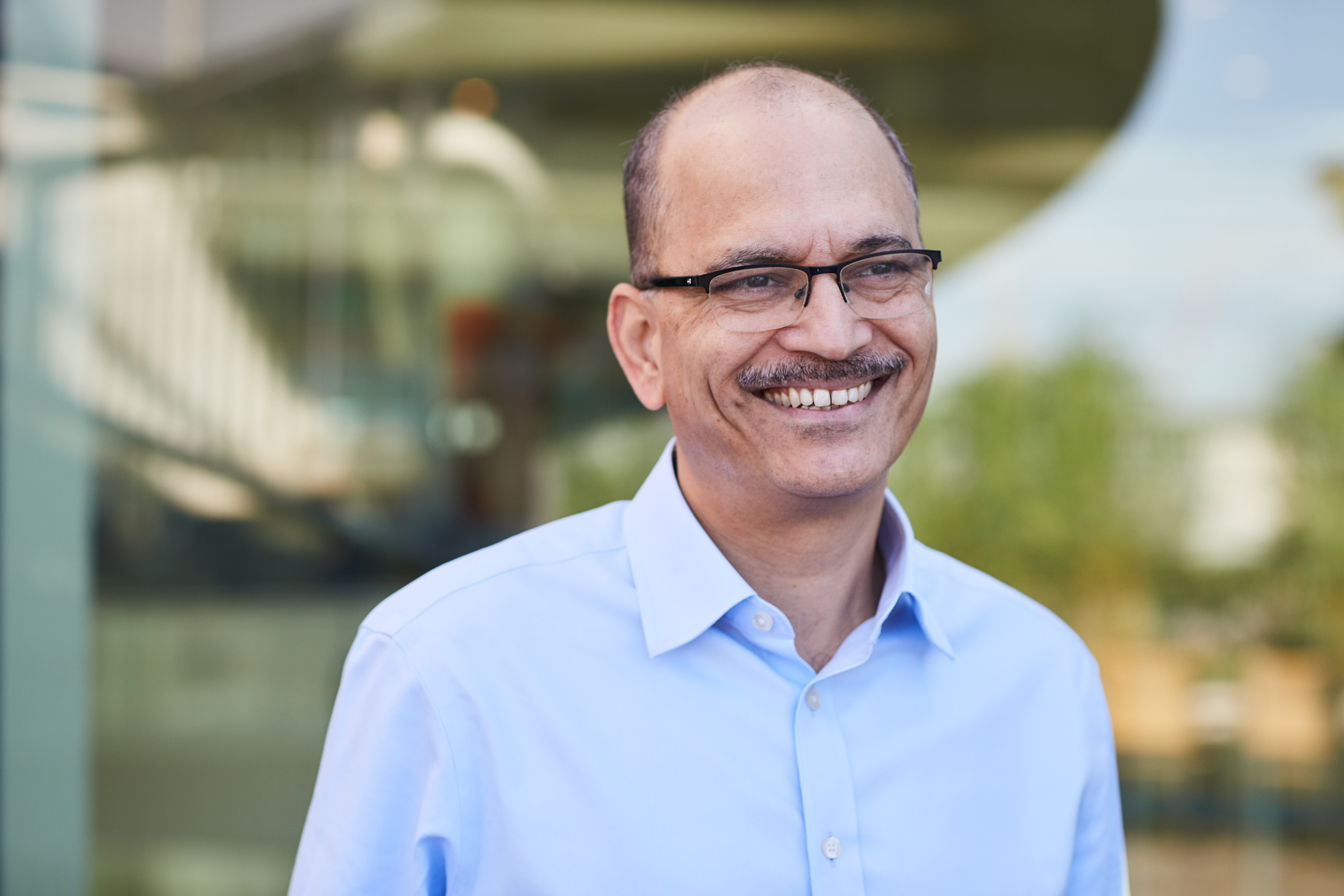
- Nitin Paranjpe
- Born: 1963 (age 62–63)
- Education: Jai Hind College (HSC); College of Engineering, Pune (B.E.); Jamnalal Bajaj Institute of Management Studies (MBA)
- Occupations: Chief Transformation Officer & Chief People Officer, Unilever

Nitin Paranjpe (born 1963) is the present Chairman of Hindustan Unilever Limited (HUL). He is also the Chief Mentor and Operating Partner at Kedaara Capital, a private equity firm. In addition he serves as an independent director on the Board of Infosys Ltd and Heineken NV. As an executive he worked with Unilever for 37 years and was a member of their Executive Board for the last 11 years during which he performed several roles including that of Chief Transformation Officer & Chief People Officer, Chief Operating Officer (COO) of Unilever, President of Unilever's Food and Refreshment business and President of Home Care. Paranjpe was also the CEO of the Unilever's Indian business - Hindustan Unilever - and Executive Vice President for the South Asia region encompassing Unilever's businesses in India, Pakistan, Bangladesh, Sri Lanka and Nepal from 2008-2013. During his long career Paranjpe was the recipient of several awards for his contribution to business and industry.

== Early life ==
Paranjpe obtained a degree in BE (Mechanical Engineering) from College of Engineering, Pune and an MBA in Marketing from Jamnalal Bajaj Institute of Management Studies, Mumbai.

== Career ==
Nitin Paranjpe joined the Indian subsidiary of Unilever, named Hindustan Lever Limited at the time as a management trainee in 1987. In his early years he performed different roles across marketing and customer development. Subsequently, he moved to London to work as Executive Assistant to the Chair and Unilever Executive Committee and then returned to lead the Laundry and Household Care categories in India before joining the management committee of the Indian business in 2006 as head of the Home and Personal Care business. Paranjpe became the CEO of the Indian business and Executive Vice President for the South Asia region in 2008, a role he performed until October 2013, when he became the President of Unilever's Home Care business. After serving in this position for 5 years, he became the President of food and refreshments and member of the Unilever Leadership Executive on 1 January 2018. He is currently Unilever’s Chief Operating Officer, a role he was appointed in May 2019.

Paranjpe is also a member of the Unilever Leadership Executive.

Paranjpe was the youngest CEO in the history of Hindustan Unilever and is credited with its turnaround in an adverse macro-economic environment.
