= Archana Bhargava =

Indian Businesswoman

- Born: 1955 (age 70–71)
- Education: Miranda House
- Occupation: Banker
- Title: Former Chairperson of United Bank of India (2013-2014); Executive Director of Canara Bank (2011-2013)
- Spouse: Sunil Bhargava
- Children: 1

Archana Bhargava was the chairperson of United Bank of India.

== Career ==
Archana Bhargava was the Executive Director of Canara Bank in 2011 and the Chairman-cum-Managing Director of United Bank of India (UBI) in 2013. She has been allegedly involved in corruption.
