= Renuka Ramnath =

Indian private equity fund manager

Renuka Ramanth
- Born: 14 September 1962 (age 64)
- Education: Veermata Jijabai Technological Institute, University of Mumbai
- Occupations: Founder and CEO of Multiples Asset Management Pvt. Ltd.
- Children: Two

Renuka Ramnath (born 14 September 1962) is an Indian private equity fund manager, and the founder and CEO of Multiples Asset Management Ltd. Renuka recently retired from the Board for Tata Communications after serving as its Chairperson. She is currently a director on the boards of Network18, PVR INOX, Multiples and several other portfolio companies. She was the chairperson of the Indian Private Equity and Venture Capital Association.

== Early life ==
Reunka was born in Bombay (now Mumbai) into a Tamil family. She attended Saraswati Vidyalaya, an English-medium school in Chembur. She studied textile engineering at Veermata Jijabai Technological Institute and later completed a postgraduate degree in business administration from the University of Mumbai.

== Career ==
Ramnath founded Multiples Asset Management in 2009, with a focus on mid size companies and investments between $15 million and $50 million. The firm's partners include the Canada Pension Plan Investment Board which invested $100 million in 2010. Multiples has invested in companies such as Acko, Delhivery, Licious, Encube Ethicals, IEX, PVR INOX, Kogta Financials, MoEngage, Quantiphi, Vastu Housing Finance, and Zenex.

Prior to founding Multiple Asset Management Ltd., Ramnath was the MD and CEO of ICICI Ventures, the venture capital arm of the ICICI Group, through the period that saw the firm become one of the largest private equity funds in India. She is credited with helping grow Multiples to a $3 billion PE fund.

She has also served within the ICICI Group across investment banking, e-commerce, and private equity. In this time she is also credited with raising, managing and divesting the $250 million India Advantage fund, generating a more than triple return on capital.Majumdar, Shyamal (October 19, 2010). "Lunch with BS: Renuka Ramnath" – via Business Standard. In April 2020, Ramnath was appointed chairperson of the Indian Private Equity and Venture Capital Association."IVCA appoints Renuka Ramnath as chairperson". Business Standard. 15 April 2020.

Some of Ramnath's venture investments include investments in Air Deccan, Tata Infomedia, and VA TechWabag.

Ramnath and ICICI Ventures were also the targets of a legal action from Azim Premji's investment company Premji Invest when one of the portfolio companies Subhiksha, a leading discount retailer, ran out of cash and closed over 1,600 stores nationwide. The notice alleged that Ramnath and ICICI Ventures had not revealed the extent of Subhiksha's problems before the sale to Premji Invests.

Ramnath has been featured in listings such as the Top 25 Most Powerful Women in Business (Business Today, India); India's most Powerful CEO's (Economic Times), the Top 25 Non Bank Women in Finance (US Banker's global list), Asia's Women in the Mix: The Year's Top 50 for Achievement in Business (Forbes), and the Top 25 women in Asian asset management (Asian Investor).
