= Nabomita Mazumdar =

Indian businesswoman

- Website: www.nabomita.in

Nabomita Mazumdar is an Indian businesswoman who was named a Top 100 Women Achiever's Award winner by the Ministry of Women and Child Development in 2016. She worked as a freelance advisor to an online community, Cite Community, serving more than 3 million management professionals worldwide.

Mazumdar is a speaker for Future of Work, HR, Startup, Women and Business, Social media and Technology. She has been invited by forums worldwide including Adobe Think Tank at San Francisco.

Mazumdar has received acknowledgements and awards for her work. She was ranked second in the Top 20 HR Influencers in Social Media by SHRM India 2015. She received Best 100 Young Speaker Award Cambridge English in Asia, 2011 Western Region. She was named one of the Top 25 Influential Women on Twitter by CIOL India.
