= Leena Tewari =

Indian businessperson and author

- Born: 9 March 1957 (age 69)
- Occupation: Chairperson of USV Private Limited
- Children: 2

Leena Gandhi Tewari is an Indian businessperson and author. She is the chairperson of USV Private Limited, a multinational pharmaceutical and biotechnology company based in Mumbai. USV was founded by her grandfather Vithal Balkrishna Gandhi in 1961. With a net worth of US$2.6 billion, Tewari is one of the richest Indians and frequently appears in Forbes magazine's list. The company specializes in diabetic and cardiovascular drugs as well as biosimilar drugs, injectables and active pharmaceutical ingredients.

== Early life and education ==
Leena was born on 9 March 1957 in suburban Mumbai into a business family. Her grandfather, Vithal Balkrishna Gandhi, co-founded USV Private Limited in 1961. She completed a Bachelor of Commerce (B.Com) degree from the University of Mumbai. She went on to earn a Master of Business Administration (MBA) from Boston University. She is married to Prashant, who is the managing director of the company.

== Philanthropy / Social Work ==
She is also involved in humanitarian works and supports Dr Sushila Gandhi Centre for Underprivileged Women where girls are mentored through academic instruction, dance and computers. In 2013, Tewari wrote the biographical book on her grandfather Vithal Gandhi titled, Beyond Pipes and Dreams.

She was placed #23 in the Hurun India Philanthropy List 2019 for a donation of ₹34 crore (US$4 million) and was ranked #3 in the list of Women Philanthropists of 2019, by the Hurun Report India Philanthropy List 2019.

== Awards and recognition ==
- Featured in Fortune India's Most Powerful Women 2022 list.
- Listed among India’s richest women by Forbes, with a net worth estimated at US$3.9 billion as of May 2025.
