= Amol Dighe =

Professor of Physics in Tata Institute of Fundamental Research, Mumbai, India

Amol Dighe is a Professor of Physics in Tata Institute of Fundamental Research, Mumbai, India. He studied in Saraswati Secondary School, Thane, Maharashtra up to 10th grade and attended D. G. Ruparel College for the next 2 years. He was awarded the Shanti Swarup Bhatnagar Prize for science and technology, the highest science award in India, for the year 2013 in physical science category. His main research interest is in the area of high energy physics with focus on particles known as neutrinos, their nature and the role they play in astrophysics and cosmology. Dighe completed his BTech in Engineering Physics (1992) from Indian Institute of Technology, Bombay, MS and PhD (1997) from University of Chicago. Later he did postdoctoral research at ICTP, Trieste, CERN and Max Planck Institute before joining TIFR as a faculty member in 2003. He is a fellow the Indian Academy of Sciences and has won the Swarnajayanti Fellowship from the Department of Science and Technology, Government of India.
