= India Infoline =

Indian financial services company

IIFL Finance Limited
- Trade name: IIFL Finance Limited
- Formerly: IIFL Holdings Limited
- Type: Public company
- Traded as: NSE: IIFL; BSE: 532636
- Industry: Financial services
- Founded: 1995
- Founder: Nirmal Jain
- Headquarters: India
- Area served: India; Canada; United States; United Kingdom; Switzerland; Singapore; Hong Kong; Mauritius; UAE
- Key people: Nirmal Jain (Chairman); R Venkataraman (Group Managing Director)
- Revenue: ▲₹5,989.40 crore (US$620 million) (2021)
- Operating income: ▲₹1,004.78 crore (US$100 million) (2021)
- Net income: ▲₹760.12 crore (US$79 million) (2021)
- Total assets: ▲₹40,666.92 crore (US$4.2 billion) (2021)
- Total equity: ▲₹5,387.51 crore (US$560 million) (2021)
- Number of employees: 300
- Website: indiainfoline.com

IIFL Finance Limited (formerly IIFL Holdings Limited) d/b/a IIFL and India Infoline Finance Limited, is an Indian diversified financial services company headquartered in Mumbai. The organisation was founded by Nirmal Jain. IIFL and its group companies are backed by Canadian investor Prem Watsa, private equity firm General Atlantic and CDC Group, the UK Government's private equity arm. IIFL is ranked among the top seven financial conglomerates in India and as the top independent financial services firm in India in terms of market capitalisation. Nirmal Jain is the chairman of the group, while R Venkataraman is the group managing director and co-promoter.

== History and overview - IIFL Group ==
IIFL was founded on 18 October 1995, by Nirmal Jain, a 1986 graduate from University of Mumbai and an alumnus of Indian Institute of Management, Ahmedabad. Jain is among the few successful entrepreneurs post the economic liberalisation era in India ushered by PV Narasimha Rao. Jain was previously employed with Hindustan Unilever Limited. The company was founded as Probity Research and Services Private Limited which provided research on the Indian economy, businesses and corporates. The name was later changed to India Infoline Limited.

A few years into the business, the organisation found itself with clients which included research organisations, banks and corporates. They then began launching their research products to become more noticeable in the market. In the meanwhile, the dotcom revolution was beginning to take place in India. The website was created in 1999.

Taking the business one step ahead this group of consultants opened a trading portal 5paisa in 2000. Thus moved into the business of being a full service broking agency. During this time they widened their distribution network.

In 2001, the Indian dotcom industry saw a downfall. During this time, sustaining became tough. The organisation then decided to tie-up with leading Life Insurance company ICICI Prudential, thus putting to use its distribution network and becoming India's first corporate agent for insurance.

Today, IIFL Holdings Limited (Bloomberg Code: IIFL IN, NSE: IIFL, BSE: 532636) is India's leading integrated financial services group with diverse operating businesses, mainly Non Banking and Housing Finance, Wealth and Asset Management, Broking, Financial Product Distribution, Investment Banking, Institutional Equities, Realty and Property Advisory Services.

IIFL Holdings has a consolidated net worth of over ₹45 billion and is a global presence in Canada, United States, UK, Singapore, Hong Kong, Switzerland, Mauritius, and the UAE; an employee workforce of over 10,500, a network of over 2,250 service locations spread across India, over ₹233 billion loan assets under management; over ₹1,250 billion in wealth assets under advice, management and distribution; over 500 stocks under research and more than 300 of the world's top institutional investors relying on IIFL's research.

== Involvement in NSEL case ==
IIFL along with few other top brokers have been accused of various irregularities on NSEL. Agencies including EOW-Mumbai and SFIO have found the top 5 brokers including IIFL guilty of misselling NSEL contracts, KYC manipulation, client code modification, benami transactions & infusion of black money through their NBFCs on the Exchange platform. The EOW had arrested senior employees of three brokerages namely IIFL, Motilal Oswal & Anand Rathi in March, 2015. This was followed by the market regulator, SEBI issuing multiple show-cause notices to the brokers in 2016, 2017, 2018 & 2019 respectively. The EOW-Mumbai in its supplementary charge sheet has also accused the three brokerages IIFL, Motilal Oswal & Anand Rathi of cheating clients. In February 2019, SEBI declared IIFL and Motilal Oswal ‘not fit and proper’ as commodity derivative brokers based on the recommendations of SFIO & EOW's report.

== Controversy About Commingling of Clients Funds ==
On 19 June, 2023, the Securities and Exchange Board of India (SEBI) passed an order restraining IIFL from accepting new clients for a period of two years, and imposing a penalty of Rs 2 crore. The order read, "The Noticee firstly didn’t assign its accounts appropriate nomenclature wherein it was keeping clients’ monies so as to clearly label them as ‘client accounts’. Additionally, it was mixing clients’ funds with its own funds before using those mixed funds for its own proprietary usage. In the end, it was using funds of its credit balance clients’ to not only fund trades of its debit balance clients but also to fund its own trades."

The Securities Appellate Tribunal (SAT) set aside the SEBI's order prohibiting IIFL to accept new clients in December 2023. Also the penalty was reduced to Rs 20 lakh from Rs 2 crore. SAT said that there has been no misuse of client funds. However, IIFL failed to change the nomenclature of the bank accounts of the clients. Considering it only as a technical breach, the penalty of Rs 20 lakh was deemed sufficient.

== Funding ==
India Infoline Finance is a subsidiary of IIFL Holdings Ltd which in 2020, raised ₹100 Crore by issuing non-convertible debentures.

== Awards and recognition ==
IIFL has been awarded by Euromoney for the Best Private Banking Services Overall in India for 2017. It has also been adjudged as the Best Private Bank in India at the Global Finance Best Private Bank Awards in 2017.

- Euromoney awards IIFL for Best Private Banking Services - India, 2017.
- ET Now - Dealing Room Heroes, 2017.
