= Spain India Council Foundation =

Spain India Council Foundation or Fundación Consejo España India is an initiative by the Ministry of Foreign Affairs and Cooperation (Spain) and a platform of civil society made up of business companies, financial institutions, cultural agents, Universities, Business Schools, lawyers and consultants invested in fostering relations between Spain and India and in collaboration with the Public Administrations. The Spain India Council Foundation in 2012 announced its list of future Indian Leaders among whom were eminent Indian professionals like Sanjeev Kapoor, Samarth singh, Indrajit Hazra, Trilochan Sastry, Alok Nanavaty, Sanaa Arora, Reuben Abraham and Sharon Thomas. It administers various programmes including the India Future Leaders Program or IFLP Summit.
