= Rajani Pandit =

Indian private investigator

- Born: 1962 (age 63–64); Maharashtra, India
- Education: Ruparel College
- Occupation: Private investigator
- Years active: 1986–present

Rajani Pandit (born 1962) is an Indian private investigator and entrepreneur from Maharashtra. Credited as the first female detective in India, in 1986 she started the Rajani Investigative Bureau, which by 2010 had grown to employ a staff of 30 detectives. Her firm primarily handles cases involving marital issues or suspected affairs, but also investigates missing persons, murder, and corporate espionage, and conducts background checks of political candidates. Pandit has authored two Marathi books on her experiences, Faces Behind Faces and Mayajal, and was the subject of the documentary Lady James Bond.

In February 2018, Pandit was among several Indian private investigators arrested by police in connection with an alleged scam involving the illegal sale and purchase of call data records. She was released on bail after 40 days and denied all wrong-doing.

== Early life ==
Rajani Pandit was born in 1962 in the state of Maharashtra, in either Mumbai or Palghar of the Thane district. She grew up in a middle-class family and has two brothers and one sister. Her father, Shantaram Pandit, worked as a sub-inspector in the Criminal Investigation Department of the local police department.

From a young age, Pandit showed a strong sense of curiosity. When she was eight or nine, she approached the body of a woman who had died in her apartment block in order to check if she was really dead, and at age 11 she investigated a present from a relative and discovered it was counterfeit merchandise. She studied Marathi literature at Ruparel College in Mumbai. In 1983, she was concerned by the actions of a female classmate who was drinking, smoking and visiting hotel rooms with boys, so she provided the parents of the girl with photographic evidence. While initially taken aback, they afterwards suggested she become a detective. Pandit's father expressed skepticism at her choice of career, but her mother supported her.

== Career ==
Having graduated, Pandit first found work as an office clerk, then agreed to help a colleague who thought her daughter-in-law was stealing money. She patiently tracked the daily schedules of all the woman's family members and discovered that the youngest son was the thief. This was her first paid case and afterwards, more people—women in particular—began coming to her for assistance. After a reporter saw a small news story about Pandit, he hired her to investigate his sister's husband, and Pandit discovered the man had a secret second family in the countryside. She gained publicity from an interview published in Marathi newspaper Loksatta.

Pandit opened the Rajani Investigative Bureau in 1986. She has been credited as the first female detective in India, and from the beginning she had to navigate challenges of local misogyny, with one newspaper refusing to print her advertisement because the editors did not believe a woman could be a private detective. She set up her office in Mahim, Mumbai. As Pandit took on more cases, media interest in her firm gradually increased, helping her develop a name for herself and attract clients on a more national scale. Some cases were now recommended to her by police. She became known for her frequent use of "old school" detective methods such as disguise and surveillance on foot. In one case, she visited Juhu Beach and feigned having mental health issues in order to evade suspicion and safely eavesdrop on two business executives suspected of fraud.

In 1988, Pandit had a breakthrough case when an influential family asked her to help solve a murder: a man had been killed, and it was suspected that a relative was behind his death. Pandit went undercover as a servant in the household for six months. After finding evidence that the family matriarch had hired the killer—her lover, who visited the house often—Pandit hid a tape recorder underneath her clothes and recorded conversations between the two conspirators. When the noisy click of the recorder almost gave her away, she created a distraction by dropping a kitchen knife on her foot and allowed herself to be rushed away to a clinic, after which she called police and had the guilty parties arrested. The successful resolution of this case firmly established Pandit's professional reputation.

By 2003, Pandit had eight employees, and her firm's regular clients included five multinational companies. By 2010, she employed a staff of 30 detectives and was handling about 20 cases a month. She has continued to helm the business, meeting with all clients personally and overseeing the progress of cases. Pandit has developed professional training courses for detectives and has hired and trained other women. Her two brothers assist with both administrative work and investigations. While most of her firm's cases are related to marital issues or suspected affairs, other cases involve missing persons, murder, domestic issues or corporate espionage. Pandit has written two Marathi books about her experiences as a private investigator, describing fictionalized versions of cases in Faces Behind Faces and Mayajal.

On February 2, 2018, Pandit was arrested by Thane police in connection with a scam in which several private detectives had allegedly obtained and sold call data records (CDRs) illegally. Authorities raided her home and seized laptops and CDs. Police alleged that Pandit had been obtaining CDRs for a significant length of time and suggested that she may have used the information for the purpose of extortion. She was released on bail after spending 40 days in jail and denied any wrong-doing. Her lawyer told the press that while Pandit had possession of an email containing two CDRs, there was no evidence that she had intentionally sought out this data, and no victims or witnesses had come forward to claim damage from Pandit's actions.

During the 2019 Indian general election, Pandit's firm was hired by political parties to conduct finance checks and background investigations on multiple candidates.

== Awards and recognition ==
Pandit has received the Hirkani award, which honours women's achievements, from public service broadcaster Doordarshan. She is the subject of a documentary film by Dinkar Rao, entitled Lady James Bond. In October 2018, Pandit was featured in a Humans of Bombay post.

A thriller based on her life, titled Kuttrapayirchi, has the actress Trisha playing the role of Pandit. The Tamil-language film was scheduled to go into pre-production in early 2018.

== Personal life ==
As of 2018, Pandit was living near Shivaji Park in Mumbai with her mother and two brothers. She is unmarried, preferring to avoid being divided between family and work.
