= Matunga =

- Neighbourhood
- Location within Mumbai
- Coordinates: 19.01798°N 72.844763°E
- Country: India
- State: Maharashtra
- District: Mumbai City
- City: Mumbai

Government
  - Type: Municipal Corporation
  - Body: Brihanmumbai Municipal Corporation (MCGM)

Languages
  - Marathi: Marathi
- Time zone: UTC+5:30 (IST)
- Pincode: 400019
- Area code: 022
- Vehicle registration: MH-01

Matunga (Marathi pronunciation: [maːʈuŋɡaː]) is a neighbourhood in the city of Mumbai, India. It is accessible from the Matunga Road station on the Western line, Matunga station on the Central Line and King's Circle station on the Harbour Line.

Geographically, Matunga is surrounded by the Mahim to the West, Sion to the North, Dadar to the South, Wadala to the East

== History ==
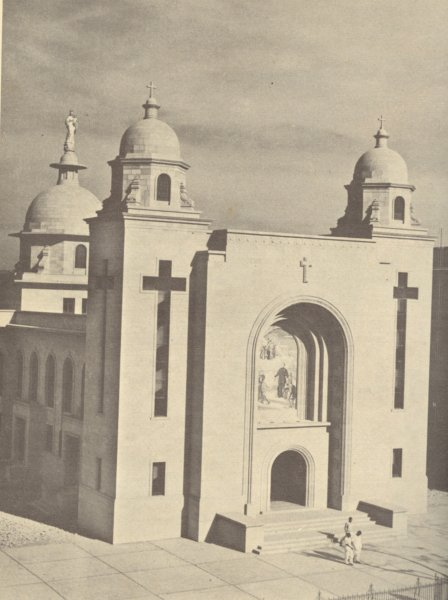
A historical picture of the Church of Mary, Help of Christians, located next to Don Bosco School.

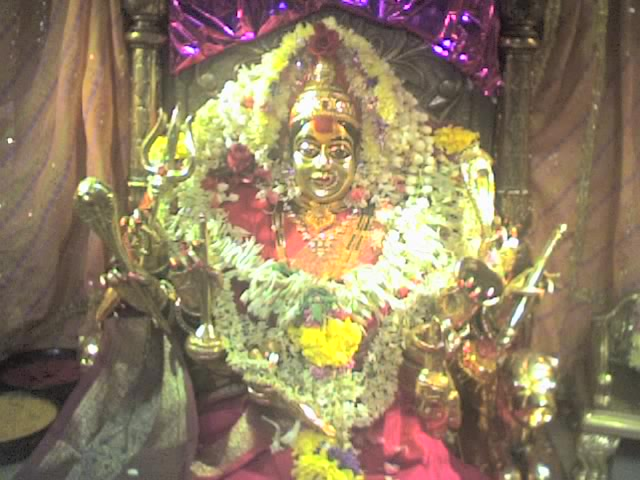
Marubai Temple, Matunga

Matunga formed a part of the seven original islands of Mumbai, with Mahim, then known as Mahikavati. It is said that the King of Mahikavati had his elephant stables in Matunga, and that the name Matunga was derived from "Matanga", the Sanskrit word for elephant.

Matunga was among the first well-planned localities of Mumbai. The Dadar-Matunga-Wadala-Sion plan of 1899-1900 was formulated to evenly distribute the population, as well as provide better living standards. Matunga has a juxtaposition of Irani cafes and Udupis, and houses one of the oldest residents of Mumbai.

== Demographics ==
Matunga has a large population of South Indian people who have been residing here for several decades. An effect of this has been a good number of traditional South Indian temples and restaurants serving authentic South Indian dishes that can be found in the area.

Matunga, having a predominantly Hindu population, also has a sizeable presence of Maharashtrians, South Indians, Bengalis and Gujaratis.

== Culture ==
Matunga has numerous temples, namely, the Astika Samajam, the South Indian Bhajan Samaj, Sri Sankara Matham, Sri Kanyaka Parmeshwari Temple, The Church of Mary, Help of Christians (also known as Don Bosco Church), the Jain temples in Kings Circle and the Marubai Temple.

There is also the Matunga Mosque which is an important place of worship for members of the Muslim community.

The Shanmukhananda Auditorium and Mysore Auditorium, a major cultural centre lies on the border of Matunga and Sion. Matunga also houses multiple cultural centres, namely, the Mysore Association,

== Educational institutions ==
The Veermata Jijabai Technological Institute (VJTI), Institute of Chemical Technology (erstwhile University Department of Chemical Technology), Guru Nanak Khalsa College, R.A. Podar College, Ramnarain Ruia College, and Welingkar Institute of Management are some of higher education institutions located in Matunga. These institutions are accredited by the National Assessment and Accreditation Council (NAAC).

Some of the other schools nearby are South Indian Education Society High School, J.B.Vacha School in Dadar Parsi Colony, and King George School nearby in Dadar, which is on the border of Matunga and Dadar.

In 1937, the general council of Salesians of Don Bosco approved a plan to buy 60,000 square yards (50,000 m^{2}) land in Matunga from the Bombay Municipal Corporation. The Corporation approved the sale on 16 July 1937. The Salesians bought the land for ₹229,160. The Don Bosco High School (formerly known as The Catholic Educational Institute) run by them was shifted from the rented premises at Tardeo to the new Don Bosco campus at Matunga.
