= USV (company) =

Indian pharmaceutical company

USV Private Limited
- Type: Private
- Industry: Pharmaceuticals
- Founded: 1961; 65 years ago
- Founder: Vithal Balkrishna Gandhi
- Headquarters: Mumbai, Maharashtra, India
- Key people: Leena Tewari (Chairperson) Prashant Tewari (Managing Director)
- Products: Pharmaceutical drugs, generic drugs, antiviral drugs, over-the-counter drugs
- Revenue: ▲₹4,564 crore (US$470 million) (FY24)
- Net income: ▲₹1,377 crore (US$140 million) (FY24)
- Number of employees: 5,000
- Website: www.usvindia.com

USV Private Limited (formerly USV Limited) is an Indian multinational pharmaceutical and biotechnology company in Mumbai. The company operates across 75 countries globally, and is a leading producer of Metformin in India.

The company was founded by Vithal Balkrishna Gandhi. Leena Tewari, his granddaughter, is the chairperson of the company, and Prashant Tewari is the managing director.

The company is focused on the development of small-molecule active pharmaceutical ingredients along with custom research services for drug development.

USV is also the producer and retailer of Sebamed products in India. It is also the marketer of some of Fujix Corp's products in all global markets outside Japan and United States.
