= WE School =

Private business school in India

WeSchool
- Former names: Prin. L. N. Welingkar Institute of Management Development and Research
- Type: Private business school
- Established: 1977
- Affiliations: University Grants Commission; National Assessment and Accreditation Council
- Director: Dr.Uday Salunkhe
- Location: Mumbai & Bangalore, India
- Campus: Urban

WE School is a private business school in India, with branches in Mumbai and Bangalore. Mumbai is the older center.

== History ==
Prin. L. N. Welingkar Institute of Management Development & Research (WeSchool) is a Business School in India. Run by Shikshan Prasarak Mandali, Pune, a charitable trust in Maharashtra. Established in 1977 it offers Post Graduate Diplomas in Management in Retail, Family Managed Business, Business Design & Innovation, Rural Management, Healthcare Management, Media & Entertainment Management and E-business.

WeSchool, Bangalore was established in 2008 at Electronic City Phase -1 and has 3 full-time courses: PGDM, PGDM–E Biz and PGDM-Business Design & Innovation.

WeSchool has programs such as Post graduation in Business management, Business Design and Innovation, E-business, Retail, Healthcare, Rural Management, programs for Family Managed business, initiated several partnerships with industry and international universities. In 2015, WeSchool received the 'AICTE -CII best industry-linked management institute' award.

== Key milestones ==
- 1977: MANDALI sets up Prin L N Welingkar Institute of Management Development & Research
- 1984-1986: First batch of MMS, affiliation with the University of Mumbai
- 1994: PGDM, AICTE approved MMS & MMM (Part-Time)
- 2001: PGDM Ebiz
- 2002: College shifted to a new campus in Matunga, Mumbai
- 2002: MIM /MIF (part-time)
- 2004: Bengaluru Campus established with Ebiz
- 2005: PGDM Retail introduced
- 2007: Introduced the PGDM –Business Design program
- 2010: PGDM Executive course introduced
- 2011: PGDM Healthcare introduced
- 2011: PGDM Rural Management (Emerging Economies) launched
- 2014: PGP Entrepreneurship introduced
- 2016: PGDM Media and Entertainment introduced

== Global linkages ==
WeSchool has established international links with foreign universities like

- Copenhagen Business School (Denmark)
- Mälardalen University (Sweden)
- Jönköping International Business School (Sweden)
- Lancaster University (United Kingdom)
- University of Hull (United Kingdom)
- MacEwan University (Canada)
- University of Bamberg (Germany)
- Stuttgart Media University (Germany)
- Unitec Institute of Technology (New Zealand)
- Curtin Technical University (Australia).

== Courses offered ==
- Masters in Management Studies (MMS)
- Post Graduate Diploma in Management(PGDM)
- Post Graduate Diploma in Management (E-Business)
- Post Graduate Diploma in Management in Business Design(PGDM-BD)
- Post Graduate Diploma in Management in Healthcare
- PGDM-Rural Management (Emerging Economies)
- PGDM Retail Management
- PGDM Research and Business Analytics
- PGDM Media & Entertainment
- Post Graduate Program in Entrepreneurship
- Post Graduate Program in Media & Entertainment Management

== Campuses ==
=== WeSchool Mumbai ===
WeSchool expanded from the small space of 10,000 sq ft in Sion, Mumbai to the newer campus with total area of 1,70,000 square feet in Matunga, Mumbai. Currently, Prof. Dr. Uday Salunkhe is the Group Director of both Mumbai and Bangalore campuses. WeSchool offers hostel facilities for boys and girls within 2 km from the college. Availability of hostel rooms are on a first come, first serve basis and first preference is given to non-locals.

=== WeSchool-Bangalore ===
The Bengaluru campus of Welingkar was inaugurated in 2008, on a 1.5-acre property in Electronic City, Bangalore, in the vicinity of over 180 IT companies. Being a residential school, there are over 300 students studying at WeSchool, all from different parts of the country.

The Bangalore Campus is known for its various events conducted by Career Management Center (CMC) involving several sector-based Industry Roundtables to engage senior members from the corporate and invite them for sectorial discussions at Welingkar, where the students can also present their learnings and projects.

There are annual sports events Jogabonito and We-cricket where alumni, faculty, and students participate. The college has a cafeteria called Unwind and a ‘Hobby Kitchen’ where students can prepare food for themselves and sports facilities like gym, table tennis, a billiards room and Badminton Courts.

There are various clubs in the college- MPower- The Marketing Club, Arthakul- The Finance Club, Ethnos- HR Club, Operations Club which organize various events, roundtables, conferences every year enabling to students to build industrial connections and interact with the experts in the field.

== Welingkar’s Distance Learning Program(DLP)/ Part Time (3 Years ) ==
The autonomous Welingkar Institute of Management offers distance learning programs. It is one of the few institutions whose distance learning programs have received accreditation from the Distance Education Council (DEC), the University Grants Commission (UGC), and the Distance Education Bureau (DEB), a body under the Central Government of India.

Distance Education Council (DEC) has been set up by the Govt. of India under the IGNOU Act for assessment and accreditation of distance education institutes in India.

Welingkar's Distance Learning Program (DLP) was appraised by DEC with regard to its content, quality of education and its delivery systems.

Specializations available:

- Marketing Management
- Finance
- Human Resource Management
- Operations Management
- Rural Management
- Retail Management
- General Management
- Operations Management
- E-Business
- General Management
- Services Excellence
- Rural and Agri. Business
- Media And Advertising
- Travel & Tourism mgmt.
- Healthcare management
- Hospitality Management
- IT Project Management
- Banking, Insurance & Investment
- Advertising & Media
