= Nirmal Jain =

Indian billionaire businessman (born 1967)

- Born: 1967 (age 58–59)
- Education: Narsee Monjee College of Commerce and Economics; Indian Institute of Management Ahmedabad; Institute of Chartered Accountants of India
- Occupation: Businessman
- Known for: Founder of India Infoline and 5paisa.com
- Title: Chairman, India Infoline (IIFL Group)
- Spouse: Married
- Children: 3
- Website: Official website

Nirmal Jain (born 1967) is an Indian billionaire businessman. He is the founder and chairman of India Infoline (IIFL) Group, a financial conglomerate. IIFL and its group companies are backed by Canadian investor Prem Watsa, private equity firm General Atlantic and CDC Group, the UK Government's private equity arm.

== Early life ==
Nirmal Jain earned a bachelor's degree in commerce (B.Com) from Narsee Monjee College of Commerce and Economics, a constituent college of the University of Mumbai, followed by MBA from the Indian Institute of Management Ahmedabad. He is also a certified chartered accountant from ICAI.

== Career ==
In 1989, Jain started his career with Hindustan Unilever, as a commodities' trader.

In 1995, Jain founded an equity research company that later became India Infoline (or IIFL Group). In 2000, he started one of India's first online trading websites. The business later diversified into life insurance, mutual funds, equities and other financial services.

In March 2018, Bloomberg LP reported that IIFL had doubled in value over the preceding 12 months and that Jain was now a billionaire. Jain owns 23% of IIFL, directly or indirectly.

== Personal life ==
Jain lives in Mumbai with his wife and three children. He owns a property in Amby Valley that he "never visits".

In 2016, his eldest daughter, Harshita, was studying to be a chartered accountant.

As of 2018, Harshita has completed the CA course and is an MBA candidate at Stanford Graduate School of Business, California.

Jain founded the IIFL foundation. He is one of the founders of the liberal education oriented Ashoka University along with Dilip Sanghvi, Deep Kalra, and Jerry Rao.
