= Vinita Bali =

Indian businesswoman

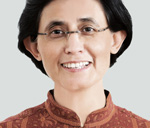
- Vinita Bali, Managing Director & CEO of Britannia Industries
- Born: 11 November 1955 (age 70)
- Education: Delhi University; JBIMS (MBA); Michigan State University
- Occupation: M.D of Britannia
- Years active: 1980–present

Vinita Bali (born 1955) is an Indian businesswoman who was formerly the managing director of Britannia Industries Limited.

== Education ==
In 1975, she received a bachelor's degree in economics from Lady Shri Ram College for Women at the University of Delhi. Then she earned an MBA from Jamnalal Bajaj Institute of Management Studies. She received a scholarship to Michigan State University in the United States and served as an intern at United Nations Headquarters.

== Career ==
Her first job was at Voltas, where she worked on the launch of the soft drink brand Rasna. She worked for the Indian division of Cadbury for 14 years, expanding the company's markets in India and Africa. In 1994, Coca-Cola hired her as its marketing director and she was later appointed Vice President of Marketing for Latin America. During her nine years at Coke, Bali also worked as Vice President of Corporate Strategy. She left Coca-Cola in 2003 to work at the Zyman Group. She was Managing Principal and Head of the Business Strategy at the group's Atlanta location.

She left in 2005 to take up the position of CEO at Indian food company Britannia Industries, where she was eventually appointed managing director in 2006. Under her direction, Britannia's revenue tripled to $841 million. Bali was awarded the "Business Woman of the Year" Award at the 2009 Economic Times Awards. In 2009, she founded the Britannia Nutrition Foundation which combats child malnutrition through the distribution of fortified biscuits to Indian schoolchildren. She won a Corporate Social Responsibility Award for her work with the foundation. In 2011, Forbes named her on its list of "Asia's 50 Power Businesswomen". Vinita is chair of the Board of the Directors of the Global Alliance for Improved Nutrition (GAIN).

Cognizant Technology Solutions, a US-based IT company with a large presence in India, appointed Vinita Bali as an independent director effective 24 February 2020. "We are delighted that Vinita Bali has joined the Cognizant Board," said Michael Patsalos-Fox, Cognizant's chairman of the board. "We believe Vinita's extensive and successful experience at large companies, both India-based and multinational, will make a significant contribution to Cognizant."

== Personal life ==
Ms.Bali has interests in sports, love for theatre & Indian classical music. She has received sixteen years of training in Kathak (Indian classical dance form).

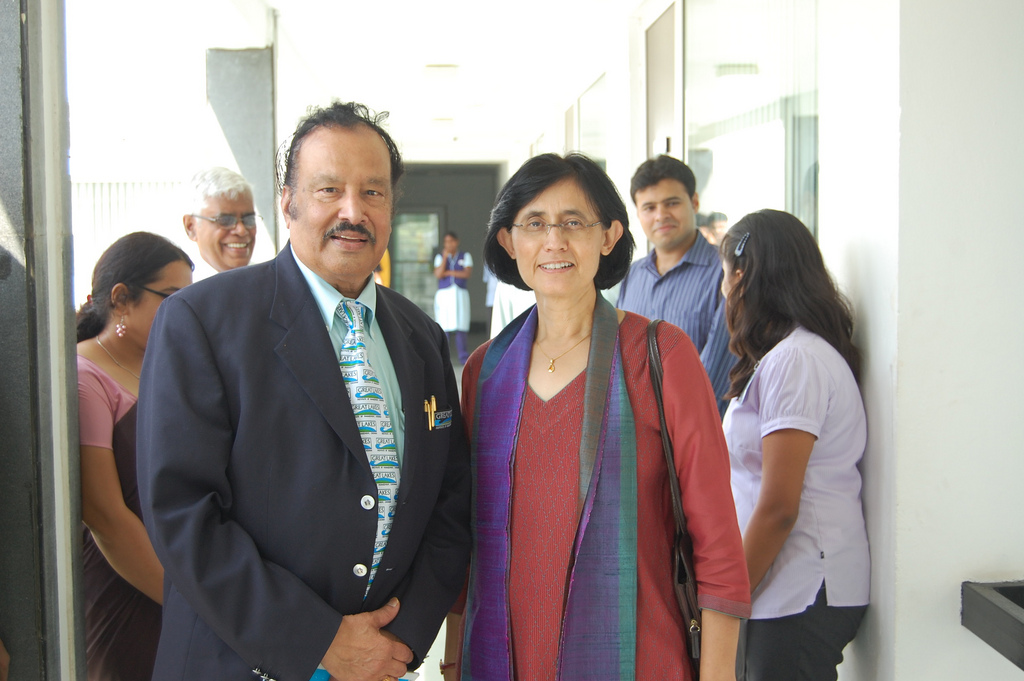
Vinita Bali and Dr. Bala at Great Lakes Institute of Management
