= Jamnalal Bajaj Institute of Management Studies =

Faculty of the University of Mumbai

Coordinates: 18.9089°N 72.8123°E

- Motto: Setting new standards in the business of management
- Type: Public
- Established: 1965; 61 years ago
- Academic affiliations: University of Mumbai
- Director: Dr. Kavita R. Laghate
- Location: Mumbai, Maharashtra, India
- Acronym: JBIMS
- Nickname: JB or Bajaj
- Website: jbims.edu

Jamnalal Bajaj Institute of Management Studies (commonly referred to as JBIMS) is the Department of Management Studies of the University of Mumbai, situated in Churchgate, Mumbai. The institute is named after the noted industrialist and freedom fighter Jamnalal Bajaj.

== History ==
Established in 1965 by the University of Mumbai in collaboration with the Graduate School of Business, Stanford University, JBIMS received foundational support through a donation from the Jamnalal Bajaj Seva Trust. It was amongst the first Indian institutions to offer a full-time two-year master's programme in management studies.

== Programmes ==
JBIMS offers several full-time, part-time, and research-based academic programmes in management.

=== Master of Management Studies (MMS) ===
This is the flagship two-year, full-time postgraduate management programme of JBIMS. The programme was deliberately titled MMS rather than MBA to emphasise that the program covers management principles applicable to all organisations, not just businesses. It offers specialisations in:

- Finance
- Marketing
- Human Resources
- Operations and Supply Chain Management
- Systems and Digital Business

=== Master of Science in Finance (MSc Finance) ===
Launched in 2013, this was the first instance where a MSc program was offered by a college in finance, in India the programme covers rigorous training in finance, quantitative methods, and economics.

=== Master in Human Resource Development (MHRD) ===
A two-year, full-time programme launched in 2019, the MHRD course prepares students for strategic roles in HR with emphasis on performance management, compensation, HR analytics, industrial relations, and labour law.

=== Master of Management Studies (MMS)Three Year Master's Degree Programmes ===
JBIMS also offers three years master's degrees across four specialised areas:

- Marketing Management
- Finance Management
- Information Management
- Human Resource Development and Management

These programmes extend over three years (six semesters) and are designed for working professionals seeking to enhance their managerial capabilities.

=== Doctoral Programme ===
JBIMS conducts a Ph.D. research programme in Management Studies through its research centre affiliated with the University of Mumbai.

== Admission ==
Admission is primarily entrance-based. For MMS, students are selected via the Common Admission Process (CAP) conducted by the Directorate of Technical Education, Maharashtra. Accepted entrance examinations include MAH-CET, CAT, MAT, ATMA, GMAT and CMAT.

Typical cutoff percentiles are exceedingly high:

- MAH-CET: 99.90–99.99 (Different for OMS and MMS students)
- CAT/CMAT: ~99.99

The institute follows reservation policies as per Maharashtra government norms, with separate merit lists for different categories of candidates.

== Rankings ==
JBIMS continues to rank amongst the top business schools in India:

- 10th – Outlook ICARE Ranking 2024
- 19th – IIRF Ranking 2024
- Unranked – NIRF Management Ranking 2024

== Placements ==
JBIMS has a robust placement record. In 2024, the highest package offered was ₹87.12 lakh per annum (LPA) and the average was ₹26 LPA.

Prominent recruiters include:

- American Express
- Deloitte
- HDFC Bank
- ICICI Bank

The institute is widely regarded for its return on investment (ROI), with a reported ROI of 459.3%, making it one of the most cost-effective management programmes in the country.

== Notable alumni ==
JBIMS has earned the sobriquet "CEO Factory" due to its distinguished alumni holding leadership positions across industries:

- Uday Kotak – Founder, MD & CEO, Kotak Mahindra Bank
- Manjeev Singh Puri – Indian Diplomat and Former Ambassador of India to Nepal, Luxembourg, Belgium and European Union
- Ajay Piramal – Chairman, Piramal Group
- Chanda Kochhar – Former MD & CEO, ICICI Bank
- Mani Ratnam – Renowned filmmaker
- Harish Manwani – Ex-COO, Unilever; Senior Operating Partner, Blackstone
- Nitin Paranjpe – CEO & MD, Hindustan Unilever
- Vinita Bali – Former MD, Britannia Industries
- Siddharth Roy Kapur – CEO, UTV Motion Pictures
- Sam Balsara – Founder, Chairman & MD, Madison World
- Suresh Kumar – Former Assistant Commerce Secretary, USA
- Dhvani Desai – Animation Filmmaker
- Lalita D. Gupte – Former Joint MD, ICICI Bank; Chairperson, ICICI Venture

== Campus ==
The current campus is situated at 164, Backbay Reclamation, H.T. Parekh Marg, Churchgate, Mumbai. There are proposals for a new campus at the Kalina complex of the University of Mumbai.

The iconic red-brick building of JBIMS has historical significance and houses classrooms, a library with over 40,000 volumes, computer laboratories, and administrative offices.

== See also ==
- University of Mumbai
- Jamnalal Bajaj
- List of business schools in India
