= Veermata Jijabai Technological Institute =

College in Mumbai, Maharashtra, India

Coordinates: 19.022281°N 72.856184°E

- Seal of VJTI
- Former name: Victoria Jubilee Technical Institute (1887–1997)
- Type: Government-aided autonomous engineering and technological institute
- Established: 1887; 139 years ago
- Affiliations: University of Mumbai
- Chairman: Dr. Sudhir Mehta
- Director: Dr. Sachin Kore
- Faculty: 150
- Students: 2,860
- Undergraduates: 2,160 (540/year)
- Postgraduates: 556
- Doctoral students: 69
- Location: Matunga, Mumbai, Maharashtra, India
- Campus: Urban 16 acres (65,000 m^{2})
- Website: www.vjti.ac.in

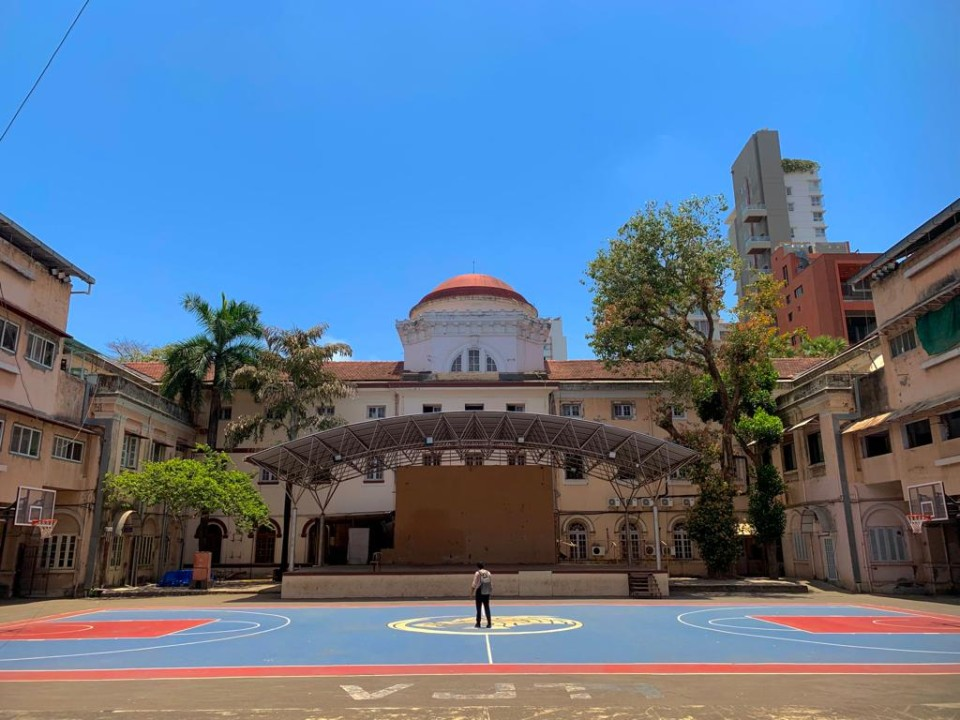
VJTI Quadrangle

Veermata Jijabai Technological Institute (VJTI) is a state funded college located in Mumbai, Maharashtra, India. Founded in 1887 and formerly known as the Victoria Jubilee Technical Institute, it adopted its present name on 26 January 1997. VJTI is an academically and administratively autonomous institute, but it is affiliated to the University of Mumbai. The institute is financially supported by the Government of Maharashtra. It is named after Rajmata Jijabai Saheb Bhonsale, the mother of Chhatrapati Shivaji Raje Bhonsale Maharaj, the founder of the Maratha Empire.

After being awarded academic and administrative autonomy in 2004, VJTI became operational under the administration of a board of governors. VJTI is also the Central Technical Institute of Maharashtra State. The institute trains students in engineering and technology at the certificate, diploma, degree, post-graduate and doctoral levels.

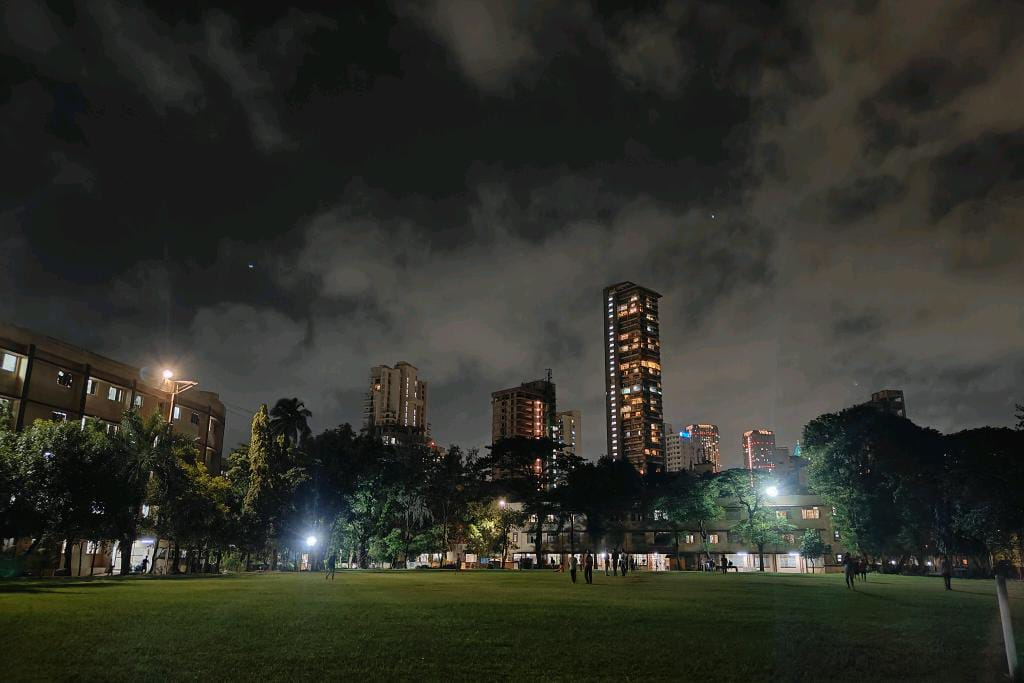
Hostel ground

VJTI is an academically and administratively autonomous institute, but it is affiliated to the University of Mumbai. The institute is financially supported by the Government of Maharashtra.

== History ==
=== Foundation and early years (1887–1960) ===
The institute was founded in 1887 and commenced with two departments, the Sir J. J. School of Mechanical Engineering and the Ripon Textile School.

=== Development and post-autonomy (1960–present) ===
Prior to 1960, Victoria Jubilee Technical Institute was the only institute offering Engineering degree and postgraduate courses under the University of Bombay and enjoyed de facto autonomy. On Republic Day in 1997, the Institute was renamed to Veermata Jijabai Technological Institute.

VJTI was conferred with the title of 'Knowledge Partner' for the upcoming Centre of Excellence of Sports Textiles of Government of India.

== Organisation and administration ==
=== Governance ===
At the institutional level, VJTI is governed by a board of governors with a chairman, the director as a member and other members of the board. Members include heads of industry, prominent VJTI alumni as well as heads of other educational institutions.

The key people in the execution of the institute's activities are the director, who is assisted by the Dean (Academic programs), Dean (Students activities), Dean (Resource mobilization and finance) and Dean (Research and development), and the heads of the departments.

=== Departments ===
The institute has 12 academic departments. Of these, nine offer certificate, diploma, degree, postgraduate and/or doctoral programs. These are:

- Civil & Environmental Engineering Department
- Structural Engineering Department
- Computer Engineering & Information Technology Department
- Master in Computer Applications (MCA) Department
- Electrical Engineering Department
- Mechanical Engineering Department
- Production Engineering Department
- Textile Engineering Department
- Technical & Applied Chemistry Department

Three academic departments have supporting roles and conduct foundation courses for degree and diploma programs, but do not offer any programs of their own. These are:

- Mathematics Department
- Physics Department
- Humanities & Management Department

== Rankings ==
Institutional rankings

Engineering – India
- NIRF (2024): 101-150

Veermata Jijabai Technological Institute was rankedin the 101-150 band among engineering colleges by the National Institutional Ranking Framework (NIRF) in 2024.
