= Shivaji Park Residential Zone =

- Neighbourhood
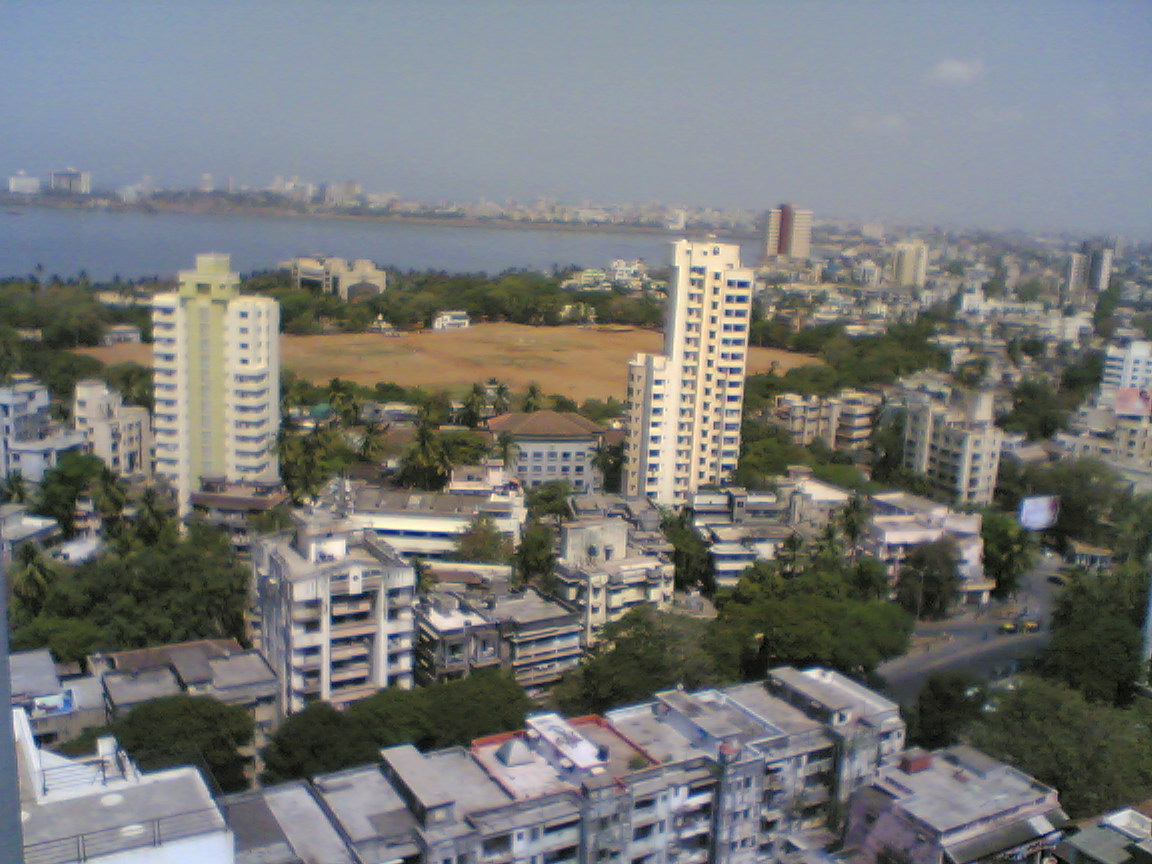
- An aerial view of the Shivaji Park residential zone

- Location in Mumbai, India
- Coordinates: 19.026724°N 72.838047°E
- Country: India
- State: Maharashtra
- District: Mumbai City
- City: Mumbai

Government
  - Type: Municipal Corporation
  - Body: Brihanmumbai Municipal Corporation (MCGM)

Languages
  - Official: Marathi
- Time zone: UTC+5:30 (IST)
- PIN: 400 028
- Area code: 022

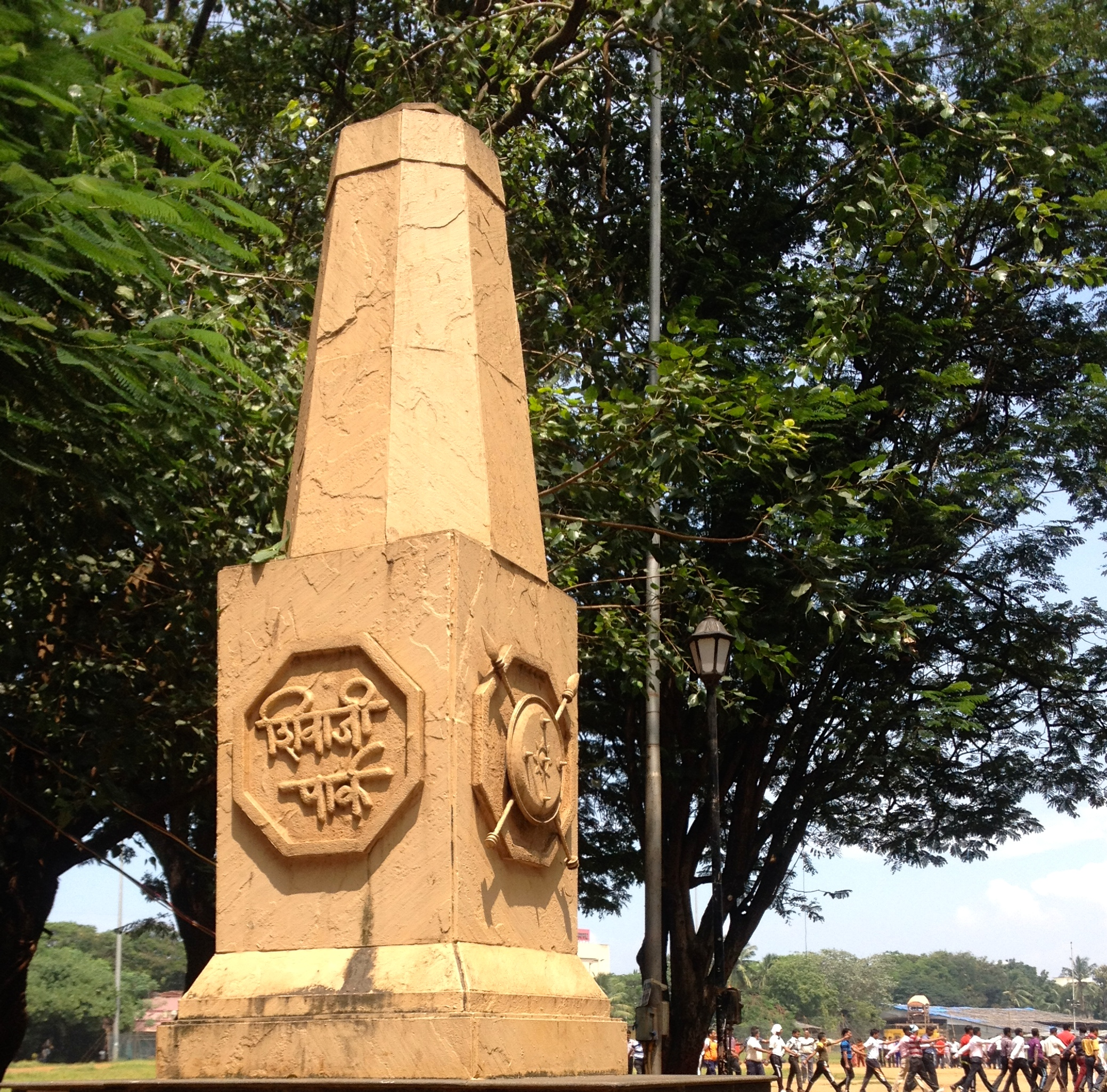

The Shivaji Park Residential Zone is a precinct consisting of 187 residential buildings that were built as part of the Shivaji Park scheme in Dadar, Mumbai. Most of the buildings in this residential locality were constructed in the early 1900s during British colonial rule in India, as a result of which many buildings here exhibit aspects of British architecture.

Park is considered an upscale real estate cluster in Mumbai, and for long has been considered to be a desirable locality particularly among the Maharashtrian community, with numerous prominent Marathi personalities such as Madhav Manohar, Vinayak Damodar Savarkar and Bal Thackeray having resided here. It is also home to the Kataria Colony, locally known as Sindhi colony, which houses Bhagnari people of Baloch descent.

== History ==
The Dadar-Matunga-Wadala-Sion scheme of 1899-1900 was the first planned suburban scheme in Mumbai (formerly Bombay).

In those days, Bombay only referred to the Fort (Mumbai precinct)area around Colaba. Nana Chowk and Tardeo were in the centre and hence those area became known as Bombay Central. Shivaji Park then was a stretch of forested land called Mahim Woods, with the only significant landmark here being the Scottish Female Orphanage, which later went on to become the prestigious Bombay Scottish School.

The Bombay City Improvement Trust conceived the development to relieve congestion in the centre of the city following the Bombay plague epidemic of the 1890s. According to the survey plan, 60,000 people were to be housed at Dadar-Matunga and an equal number in Sion-Matunga. 85,000 people were to be accommodated in the developments in Sewri and Wadala.

The plans regulated construction with emphasis on proper sanitation. No building was to be more than three storeys high, and the buildings were to have open spaces between them. The land use was planned to be a mix of residential, commercial and institutional construction. Parks and gardens were planned, and the streets were well laid out.

440 acres (1.8 km^{2}) of land was procured and leased to the government for selling. For the first time housing cooperatives were formed to take advantage of newly developed land. The Parsi and Hindu colonies in Dadar and the Tamil colony in Matunga were developed in this way.

Dadar was 6 miles (9.7 km) away from Crawford Market by the newly constructed Mohammedali Road. The tramways were extended to the new suburb. The Great Indian Peninsula Railway (GIP) constructed a bridge, now the Tilak Bridge, connecting the two suburban railways. In February 1925, the GIP opened their suburban line and started the work of electrifying the railways.

Among the institutions moved to Dadar according to the City Improvement Trust plan were Victoria Jubilee Technical Institute, now called Veermata Jijabai Technological Institute and King George School, now called the Indian Education Society's Raja Shivaji High School.

Hand-in-hand with the development of the northern suburbs in the 1930s there was a lot of activity in the Dadar-Matunga area. The Hindu colony, north of Tilak Bridge, expanded up to Amber's Marge (then Kingsway) and around the Khodadad Circle. These developments were completed by 1935. In 1937 Ramnarain Ruia College was founded and in 1939 the Ramniranjan Podar College (both run by SP Mandali), thus completing the transition of Dadar from a residential suburb into a variegated enclave.

By 1937 Shivaji Park and the surrounding areas including the Shivaji Park Residential Zone were developed. Shivaji Park was to become an important stage in the political drama which led up to India's independence, and later the political history of Bombay unfolded in the same park.

The famous Sindhi colony (Kataria Colony) in Shivaji Park was established when the Late Mukhi Shri Thakandas H Kataria purchased a plot of land at Cadell Road, Shivaji Park. Today, the society houses 150 Bhagnari families of Balochi descent.

Post independence, numerous other political events such as the formation of Shiv Sena and other important political rallies have been held at or around Shivaji Park.

Shivaji Park is regarded as the cradle of Indian cricket, with its innumerable cricket academies like those of the late Anna Vaidya and Ramakant Acharekar which produced several international cricketers for India, including famous names like Sunil Gavaskar, Sachin Tendulkar, Ajit Agarkar, Pravin Amre, Sandeep Patil, Vinod Kambli and Sanjay Manjrekar, Amit Pagnis.

== Present day ==
Today, the Shivaji Park Residential Zone has become a highly sought after upper middle class residential enclave with numerous pre-colonial buildings undergoing redevelopment to form multistoreyed towers ranging from seven storeys to 23 storeys.

Redeveloped buildings include Chanakya, Ashwamedh, Buildarch Tower, Atharva, Saket, Shivneri Heights, Royal Accord, Shree Apartments, Sankalp, and Matoshree Heights. The taller buildings offer an unhindered view of the Arabian Sea and Shivaji Park.

Numerous other buildings are in the process of being redeveloped. However, the controversial and constantly changing Floor Space Index regulations have hindered the redevelopment process significantly.

As such, the slowed redevelopment along with the ever-increasing demand for apartments in this locality have pushed up property prices to the range of Rs.35000 to Rs.50000 per square foot, because of which the average cost of an 800 sq ft 2-bedroom apartment turns out to be around Rs. 3.6 crores or approximately US$600,000.

== Attractions and amenities ==
This popular neighborhood is home to many amenities, with proximity to educational institutions and recreational facilities.

=== Sports and recreational facilities ===
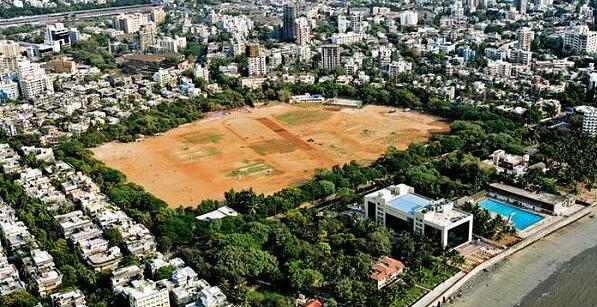
Shivaji Park is seen with the neighborhood buildings surrounding it

- Shivaji Park
- Dadar Chowpatty (Dadar Beach)
- Shivaji Park Gymkhana Club
- Mahatma Gandhi Olympic Swimming Pool
- Children's Park
- Aaji-Ajoba Park (for the elderly)
- Samarth Vyayam Mandir (health and exercise facility)
- Shivaji Park Nagarik Sangh (Residents Association)
- Bengal Club — Estd 1922
- Scouts Pavilion
- Veer Savarkar Rashtriya Smarak
- Taekwondo Association (Mahim Sports club)
- Cricket coaching institutes
- Sant Dnyaneshvar and Baji Prabhu Beach Garden

=== Schools ===
- Balmohan Vidyamandir (English and Marathi medium)
- Dr. Antonio da Silva Technical High School and Junior College of Science
- Bal Vihar (Marathi Medium)
- IES Modern English School
- Sane Guruji Vidyalaya (English and Marathi medium)
- Ruparel College
- Kirti M. Doongursee College
- Institute of Hotel Management, Catering Technology and Applied Nutrition, Mumbai
- Kohinoor College of Hotel and Tourism Management

=== Places of worship ===
- Shri Udyan Ganesh Mandir
- Kali Mandir
- Akkalkotniwasi Shri Swami Samarth Maharaj Math

=== Hospitals & Diagnostic centers ===
- Hinduja Hospital
- Shushrusha Citizens' Co-operative Hospital
- Dhanwantari Hospital
- Dr Phadke Labs
- Vaze Hospital

=== Restaurants ===
- Light of Bharat — Irani restaurant
- Gypsy Corner
- Gypsy Chinese
- Tanatan Restaurant
- Tibbs Frankie
- Gary's Frankie rolls
- Aaswad Hotel
- Prakash Upahar Gruha Hotel
- Apoorva Hotel
- Cafe Coffee Day
- Barista Cafe
- Oven Fresh
- Tamnak Thai
- Gold Rush
- Home Chef
- Sujata Hotel
- Open House
- Café Trófima
- The J
- Carter's Blue
