= Yashwant Dev =

Indian Marathi-language poet and composer

- Born: 1 November 1926
- Died: 30 October 2018 (aged 91); Mumbai, Maharashtra, India
- Known for: Marathi poetry, Marathi music

Yashwant Dev (1 November 1926 – 30 October 2018) was a Marathi poet and composer from Maharashtra, India. He has contributed scores for many Marathi and Hindi movies.

== Career ==
Dev was taught music by his father and made his public debut at All India Radio as a sitar player. He worked for Akashwani's Nagpur station in 1960s. He gained wide recognition once he launched the TV program Bhavsaragam, which helped make him popular across the Indian state of Maharashtra. After his first wife's death, he married Karuna Dev (née Desai), more famous by her name Neelam Prabhu during her marriage to Marathi stage actor Baban Prabhu when she was a major star in AIR's Shrutikaa program. For both of them, it was their second marriage after the death of first spouse.

Yashwant Dev had contributed music for over 40 plays in Marathi.

== Death ==
Dev died of pneumonia at the Shushrusha Citizens' Co-operative Hospital in Dadar, Mumbai on the 30th of October 2018 and at the age of 91, following a battle with the chikungunya virus. His wife Karuna Dev had predeceased him, around 2010.

== Awards and recognition ==
- Lata Mangeshkar award
- 2012- Ga Di Ma pratishthan award
- Ram Kadam kalagaurav award 2015

He was excellent POET.

== Poems written ==
- अरे देवा तुझी मुले अशी का रे भांडतात, कुणी एकत्र नांदती कुणी दूर दहा हात Are deva tuzi mule ka re bhandtat
- अशी धरा असे गगन कधी दिसेल का? Ashi dhara ase gagan kadhi disel ka?
- अशी ही दोन फुलांची कथा, एक शिवाच्या पदी शोभते एक शवाच्या माथा Ahi hi don fulanchi katha
- आयुष्यात खूप चौकटी पाहिल्या Aayushyat kjup choukati pahilya
- करिते जीवनाची भैरवी Karite jivanachi bhairavi
- कामापुरता मामा Kamapurta mama
- कोटि कोटि रूपे तूझी कोटी सूर्य चंद्र तारे Koti koti rupe tuzi koti surya Chandra tare
- कृष्णा उडवू नको रंग Krushna udavu nako rang
- चंद्राविना ठरावी जशी Chnadravina tharavi jashi
- जीवनात ही घडी अशीच राहू दे Jivanat hi ghadi ashich rahude
- तुझी झाले रे Tuzi zale re
- तुझ्या एका हाकेसाठी Tuzya eka hakesathi
- तू नजरेने हो म्हटले पण वाचेने वदणार कधी Tu najarene ho mhatale pan
- तेच स्वप्न लोचनांत Tech Swapan lochnat
- त्याची धून झंकारली Tyachi dhoon zankarali
- दत्तगुरूंचे दर्शन घडले Dattagurunche darshan ghadle
- दिवाळी येणार अंगण सजणार Diwali yenar anand sajnar
- नीज रे नीज रे बाळा Neej re neej re bala
- प्रिया आज माझी नसे साथ द्याया Priya aaj mazi mazi nase sath dyaya
- प्रिया साहवेना आता Priya sahvena aata
- प्रेमगीते आळविता Premgite aalvita
- भारतमाता परमवंद्य धरा Bharat mata pramvandy dhara
- मन हे खुळे कसे Man he khule kase
- मने दुभंगली म्हणून जोडता येत नाही Mane dubhangli mhanun jodta yet nahi
- माणसांच्या गर्दीत माणूस माणसाला शोधत आहे Mansachya gardit manus mansala shodhat aahe
- यश अंती लाभणार Yash anto labhnar
- येतो तुझ्या आठवणींचा घेऊन सुगंध वारा Yeto tuzya aathvanincha ghevun Sugandh vara
- रात्रिच्या धुंद समयाला Ratrichya dhund samayala
- लागेना रे थांग तुझ्या Lagena re thang tuzya
- विश्वाचा खेळ मांडिला आम्ही Vishwacha khel mandila aamhi
- शब्दमाळा पुरेशा न Shabdmala puresha n
- श्रीरामाचे चरण धरावे दर्शन मात्रे पावन व्हावे Shriramache charan dharave
- स्वर आले दुरुनी, जुळल्या सगळ्या त्या आठवणी Swar aale duruni

== Music given ==
- अखेरचे येतिल माझ्या Akherche yetil mazya
- अपुल्या हाती नसते काही Apulya hati nasate kahi
- अंबरात नाजुकशी Ambarat najukashi
- अरे देवा तुझी मुले अशी Are deva tuzi mule ashi
- अर्धीच रात्र वेडी Ardhich ratr vedi
- अशी धरा असे गगन Ashi dhara ase gagan
- अशी पाखरे येती आणिक Ashi pakhare yeti
- असेन मी नसेन मी Asen mi nasen mi
- आज राणी पूर्विची ती Aaj rani purvichi ti
- आठव येतो मज Aathav yeto aaj
- आम्हींं जावें कवण्या Aamhi jave kavanya
- आळवितां धांव घाली Aalvita dhav ghali
- उघडी नयन शंकरा ughadi nayan shankra
- एवढेतरी करून जा Evadhetari karun ja
- करिते जीवनाची भैरवी Karite jivanachi bhairavi
- कामापुरता मामा Kamapurta mama
- काही बोलायाचे आहे Kahi bolayache aahe
- कुठला मधु झंकार Kuthla madhu zankar
- कुठे शोधिसी रामेश्वर Kuthe shodisi rameshwar
- कुणि काहि म्हणा Kuni kahi mhana
- कुणि जाल का Kuni jaal ka
- केळीचे सुकले बाग Keliche sukale baag
- कोण येणार ग पाहुणे Kon yenar ga pahune
- कृष्णा उडवू नको रंग Keushna udavu nako rang
- गणपती तू गुणपती तू Ganapati tu Ganapati tu
- मन्त्रपुष्पांजली (He rendered it in the traditional style, not his new tune, upon Hridaynath Mangeshkar's request)
