= Appasaheb Marathe =

Indian businessman

Sakharam Purushottam (aka Appasaheb) Marathe
- Born: 18 June 1911; Vengurla, Sindhudurg India
- Died: 28 August 1969; Mumbai, Maharashtra, India

Appasaheb Marathe was a businessman from Maharashtra state in India. He is the founder of Marathe Udyog Bhavan. He was born into a Maharastrian Brahmin family to Purushottam Marathe and Janakibai on 18 June 1911, in Vengurle, a village in Konkan region. He lost his father at an early age. Due to extreme poverty at home he was forced to leave his native place after his matriculation and move to Mumbai for his livelihood. There he started working in a shop known as P. Shah & Co.

== Early life in Karachi ==
In the year 1931-32, he was transferred to the Karachi branch of P. Shah & Co as a manager. However, his entrepreneurial spirit did not let him continue his job, so after getting accustomed to a new life in Karachi and having gathered enough experience of business, he started his own chemical shop called Fairdeal Pharmacy. During his stay there between 1942 and 1944, with the help of Shri N. P. Patwardhan who was a relative and a partner in the Company, he started a mechanical workshop by the name 'Sunbeam Engineering Works'. He also founded 'The Sindh Industrial and Pharmaceutical Company Ltd.' in 1942. It produced vitamin-rich Shark liver oil under the brand name 'SIPOL', a substitute to imported cod liver oil, which was in short supply due to World War 2.

== Return to Mumbai ==
In 1947, he had to wind up all activities in Karachi and had to return to India due to the partition of the country. He could get away unscathed in these troubling times due to his sweet and friendly nature of getting along with everyone.

== Establishment of various business enterprises ==
After having to reluctantly return from Karachi, he had a desire to start his own business of manufacturing and so he established 'Sachin and Company' with the help of a relative Shri Patwardhan, which started getting government tenders for supply of machinery tools, hardware, etc. to factories. Another step forward in this direction was the establishment of a manufacturing unit named 'Sachin Engineering Corporation' in 1959 in a rented space in Bandra, with an intention of manufacture and sale of his own industrial goods. As this space also proved to be too small, Appasaheb took another space of 1600 sq. m. in an industrial area belonging to Portuguese Church in Dadar on lease for 99 years and constructed a huge building named Marathe Udyog Bhavan where all his activities were concentrated.

He established a company named Alpha Electricals to make battery connectors required by TELCO. In addition to having TELCO and Premier as clients, he also started supplying radio parts to Philips. In 1955, he founded Swifts Limited which supplied tools and stainless steel tea and coffee jugs to Air India. For this, he took the agency of Gedore, a German company. His three companies, namely, Sachin Engineering Corporation, Swift Pvt. Ltd. and Alpha Electricals manufactured spare parts for use in automobiles, radios, typewriters, duplicating machines, etc. Similarly he continued his business expansion by taking agency of Rallis India Limited for Rallis fans and Wolf brand electric hand tools which were very popular at the time. Later Appasaheb developed Gestetner Stencil Duplicator as a cheaper alternative to the Spirit Duplicator. Installing the necessary machinery, he also did turning, hardening and grinding jobs as well as manufactured special navigation lights for ships and water bags.

In the year 1967, Appasaheb manufactured an Offset Printing Machine. Since at that time no one was making offset machines in India, it proved to be a pioneering venture in the country.

== Personal life ==
Appasaheb, was married to Indira and had two children with her, son Suresh and daughter Vimal.

== Death ==
Appasaheb died of a heart attack on August 28, 1969, at the age of 58.

== Awards and Memorials ==
As a token of recognition of his immense work in the field of industry, the road leading to Marathe Udyog Bhavan was named as Appasaheb Marathe Marg, in the year 1974. The Swift Company received the Import Substitution Award from the Government of India in 1978 for being the first manufacturer of offset printing machines.

== Social contributions ==
Appasaheb Marathe Award was instituted 35 years ago in Balmohan Vidyamandir to be awarded to the student who excelled in English in the 10th class exams.

Appasaheb Marathe was appointed as Trustee of School at Kurla, Mumbai founded by Karachi Maharashtriya Shikshan Prasarak Mandal.
