= Dr. Antonio Da Silva High School and Junior College of Commerce =

Location
- S.K. Bole Road; Dr. S.k Bole Road, Kabutar Khana Dadar (West), Mumbai-400028, India; Mumbai, Maharashtra, 400028; India; 19.019945°N 72.840011°E

Information
- School type: trustee, Government, Semi Public Private School
- Motto: "Scientiae Luce, Caritate Duce" (In the light of science, under the leadership of charity)
- Patron saint: Reb. John Braz Fernandees
- Established: 1851; 175 years ago
- Founder: Dr Antonio Da Silva
- Status: Active
- Sister school: Dr. Antonio Da Silva Technical High School and Jr. College of Science.
- School board: Dr. Antonio Da Silva Institute Council(ADSIC)
- Authority: Dr. Antonio Da Silva Institute Council Management(ADISCM)
- Area trustee: Adrian Da Silva, Lila D’souza
- Chairperson: Adrian Da Silva
- Principal: Susana Gomes
- Staff: 500
- Teaching staff: 300
- Grades: Kindergarten–12
- Gender: Boys' School
- Age range: 3 to 18
- Enrollment: 6,000
- Average class size: 75
- Student to teacher ratio: 20:1
- Education system: Trustee, Government Aided
- Language: English
- Hours in school day: 6 to 1, 1 to 6
- Classrooms: 90
- Campus size: approximately 10 acres (40,000 m^{2})
- Campus type: Urban
- Houses: Mars, Jupiter, Venus, Saturn
- Colours: White, Blue, Yellow,
- Song: God bless the Antonians
- Nickname: Antonians, A.D.H.S.
- Publication: The Antonians Weekly, The Antonians Alumnus.
- Budget: ₹300 million (US$3.1 million)
- School fees: Free of Cost Education
- Revenue: ₹300 million (US$3.1 million)
- Affiliation: Maharashtra State Board of Secondary and Higher Secondary Education
- Founder's day: 27 June
- Former pupils: Antonians
- Website: Official Website

Dr. Antonio Da Silva High School (A.D.H.S) and Jr. College of Commerce (A.D.H.S.J.C.C) (Popularly known as A.D.H.S. or nicknamed Antonians) is a semi-private Government, Boys, day school located at Dadar in Mumbai, India. The institution was established in 1851 by Dr Antonio Da Silva and Reverend John Braz Fernandees under the name St. Johna high school. The school caters to pupils from kindergarten up to class 12. The medium of instruction is English. The school houses more than 6,000 pupils aged 3 to 18.

The school is affiliated to the Maharashtra State Board of Secondary and Higher Secondary Education, Pune, which conducts the SSC examinations at the close of class 10 and the HSC examinations at the close of class 12.

Alumni are commonly known as Antonians Alumnus. They include India politicians, government officials and business leaders. The Sister school of A.D.H.S Dr. Antonio da Silva Technical High School and Junior College of Science located at the Shivaji Park was established in June 1963.

== History ==
The Institution was founded in 1851 at Dadar in Bombay, British India by Dr. Antonio Da Silva and John Braz Fernandees under the name St. Johna high school. In 1875, Da Silva left the bulk of his estate for the extension of the high school, when the school came to its present name.

The school started a technical Stream from Standard VII in June 1963. It became a full-fledged independent Technical High School on 13 June 1971. The Junior College of both the Commerce and Technical schools, started in 1975, offering Science (Biology) and Vocational streams. Vocational streams offer three options: Electrical Maintenance, Scooter Servicing and Mechanical Maintenance.

During that time the Institution was recognised and aided by the Directors of Vocational Education and Training (Maharashtra State). The institution prepares pupils for the Secondary School Certificate Examination (with technical subjects) and Higher Secondary Certificate (with science/vocational science subjects) of the Maharashtra State Board.

== Campus site and layout ==
The Heritage building Block of the Dr. Antonio da Silva High School

Buildings include the Office Heritage Block, Heritage Block, Center Block, South Block, Antonians hall and sports complex and grounds.

=== Facilities ===
The school has a large library with over 20,000 books and digital books that are accessible to the students during school hours. Separate science laboratories for Physics, Chemistry and Biology are available. The science laboratories are used by 6–12 class students to carry out practical work. The school has three computer laboratories where students from kindergarten through class 12 study computing. The school has a mini-theatre for educational and entertainment purposes and also has a television room. The school has two drawing rooms that are used for drawing and arts. Four Gardens including two play parks, one botanical garden and one tracking garden are on the grounds.

The school has three halls: Antonians hall Old Little Hall and the Alumnus Hall. A cafeteria is run by the Interact club for use by both faculty and students. The school has various indoor and outdoor sports facilities.

== Academics ==
=== Admissions ===
The admission notice for kindergarten and junior kindergarten is put up in January. For senior kindergarten to class 8 and for class 11 of Jr. College of Commerce the notice is put up in April. During the admission procedure, preference is given to siblings of former students, Protestant Christians and relatives of teachers. An interview of each candidate is conducted as a part of the admission process.

=== Curriculum ===
The school follows the Maharashtra State Board of Secondary and Higher Secondary Education (SSC) & (HSC) syllabus. Marathi, Hindi and French are taught as second languages. English, Marathi and Hindi are taught from class 1 to class 12.

The academic year commences in June and concludes in April, consisting of two terms. The first term is from June until November and the second term is from November to April. Tests are conducted periodically and examinations are held at the end of every term.

== Academic life ==
Pupils are known as "Antonians". The Antonians and press often call alumni Antonians Almuns, or simply Old Boys. The vast majority of alumni are Indians, but a dwindling number of Englishmen from before the 1948 Batches studied there.

The school is a cosmopolitan school. The Christmas concert is a three-day event. A sports meet and a farewell party for new graduates are also held annually. Inter-house competitions are held in elocution, drama, song, etc.

== School activities ==
Extracurricular activities include student-led clubs on campus, including the Nature Club, Interact Club, Science Club, Scouts and Guides, and Scottish Junior Rifle Club. Inter-house debates, elocution, PowerPoint presentation competitions, essay writing competitions, dramatics and sporting competitions engage older students. Sports activities at the high school include football, cricket, basketball, swimming, throwball and roller skating.

=== Sports ===
Sports are compulsory. The school has over approximately 7 acres (28,000 m^{2}) of playing fields, the largest of which are Football Ground Field (FGF) and the Main Field. Cricket, hockey, athletics, boxing and association football are played seasonally. Tennis, table tennis, badminton, squash and gymnastics tournaments are held. Sport is dominated by football, cricket, basketball, hockey, volleyball and handball during the spring term and by football, athletics and boxing in the autumn term. Inter-house matches are played in cricket, hockey and football.

Sports facilities include a multi-purpose hall with a gymnasium and other indoor sports. Artificial turf cricket pitches, outdoor basketball courts, four badminton courts, two Tennis courts, four squash courts, and a ground that can be converted into a 400-metre athletics tracks. The school has a large sports field at the rear, and a separate playground for the students of junior school.

The school has a long tradition of winning major matches and tournaments in football, cricket, volleyball, handball, badminton and several other sports. The school lost the final to NSS Hill Spring Boys Under 17 Subroto Cup Football Tournaments in 2011 it has lost the Final match of the Tournaments by 0–10.

=== Clubs and societies ===
Extracurricular activities are also a compulsory element of school life. Some 27 clubs and societies exist, covering politics, drama, photography, aeromodeling, first-aid, dramatics, painting, sculpture, carpentry, amateur radio, music, senior and junior English debating societies, Model United Nations, chess and astronomy. In many societies pupils come together to discuss a particular topic or subject, presided over by a schoolmaster and often including a guest speaker.

=== Theatre and music ===
A multi-purpose theatre space known as The Antonians hall was built in 1965 seating over 1,200. It was inaugurated in April 1965 as a venue with modular seating and staging units. The facility is equipped with state-of-the-art stagecraft and engineering systems and has been the setting for numerous Shakespeare and other classic productions of western theatre, as well as musical performances and speeches during school ceremonies such as Founder's Day. The multi-purpose Old Little Hall venue is the old theatre that was built in 1851. It can accommodate approximately 400 people. Plays are regularly staged in English, Marathi and Hindi, with 11–12 productions each year, including 2 major productions as part of Founder's Day celebrations. The Inter House Once-Act Play competition is held each year, alternatively in English and Hindi. Many of the plays historically have been joint productions with its sister school.

The Alumnus Hall seats over 200 is the more modern multi-purpose theatre built in 1990 as a black box theatre with modular seating and staging units and is normally used to explore new directions in performance art. In 1999 a new music facility was built, housing a music library, a concert hall and several practice and teaching rooms where students learn western and Indian instruments.

== Affiliations ==
The school's sister school is Dr. Antonio da Silva Technical High School and Junior College of Science, located at the Shivaji Park area of Mumbai. The school also has ties with Our lady of Convent Girls High School, Our Lady of Salvation High School and many other schools.

=== Sister school ===
The school started a technical stream from Standard VII in June 1963. It became a full-fledged independent Technical High School on 13 June 1971 and is at present housed at S. Veer Savarkar Road (also known as Cadell road) in Shivaji Park. In 1970 the Institution was registered as Dr Antonio da Silva Technical High School feeder school. The Junior College of Commerce at Dr Antonio da Silva High School and Jr. College of Science at Dr Antonio da Silva Technical High School, started in 1975, offers Science (Biology) and Vocational streams. Vocational streams offer three options: Electrical Maintenance, Scooter Servicing and Mechanical Maintenance. That same year the name of the Technical Institution was renamed as Dr Antonio da Silva Technical High School and Jr. College of Science.

=== Memberships ===
The Dr. Antonio da Silva High School and Junior College of Commerce is a member of the Rotary International's Interact Club, International Boys' Schools Coalition (IBSC), Rashtriya Life Saving Society (India).

== Controversy ==
On 14 March 2013, the police and trustees of the Dr Antonio Da Silva High School were investigating allegations that a six-year-old Class I student was handcuffed with a cycle-lock chain, paraded before students of various classrooms and made to clean a toilet room. The father of the boy lodged a complaint with Shivaji Park police station against a teacher and the headmistress. The teacher allegedly handcuffed and paraded the boy, while the headmistress took no action following the parent's complaint. That month the matter was pending at the Maharashtra State Commission for Protection of Child Rights (MSCPCR).

== Incidents ==
The day after the 2011 Mumbai bombings plot happened in the front of the Dr Antonio Da Silva High School and Jr. College of Commerce.

Thirty-five years after leaving school in Std VII, gangster Ashwin Naik (49) went back to the school on 9 November 2009 to collect his leaving certificate.

On 13 July 2011 at 18:30 IST (UTC+05:30), a bomb exploded outside the school. It was the third explosive device of the 2011 Mumbai bombings. The device was placed on an electric pole at the bus stand near Kabutar Khana. At least 50 people were injured in the blast. No one from the school was injured. If the bomb had exploded five minutes earlier, thousands of students may have been injured. The school remained closed the next day.

== See also ==
- Maharashtra State Board of Secondary and Higher Secondary Education
- Education in India
- List of schools in Mumbai
- List of the oldest schools in the world
- Dadar
- 2011 Mumbai bombings
