= Plaza Cinema, Mumbai =

Cinema in Dadar, Mumbai, India

Plaza Cinema
- Location: NC Kelkar Rd, Dadar, Mumbai, India
- Capacity: 880
- Type: Cinema Hall
- Public transit: Dadar

Construction
- Opened: 1935; 91 years ago

Plaza is a single-screen cinema hall in the Dadar locality of Mumbai, Maharashtra. It has a single screen and a capacity of 880 seats.

In the 1930s, the cinema was bought by Sakharam Govindji Keni from a Parsi owner. A 2005 Times of India reports informs that V. Shantaram trust sold their rights to run the cinema to Himani & Co., and that Kiran Shantaram, V. Shantaram's son and a trustee of the V. Shantaram trust was the general manager of the cinema. Kiran Shantaram is a former sheriff of Mumbai and the head of the Asian Film Foundation.

The Plaza was one of the three cinema halls screening films in the seventh Asian Film Festival. It is an important theatre for the screening of Marathi cinema. According to Marathi film critic Amit Bhandari, it "is not a mere theatre but the reflection of aspirations of more than three generations of actors... Marathi theatre has given stalwart character artistes to both Marathi and Hindi movies. From Neelu Phule, Shreeram Lagu, Bhakti Barve, Nana Patekar, Reema Lagu, to Laxmikant Berde, Makarand Anaspure and many others — they have all stood outside the Shivaji Mandir drama theatre gates and looked across the street at Plaza hoping to see their faces smiling down from the hoardings..."

The cinema was one of the 13 places where bomb blasts occurred in Mumbai on 12 March 1993. 10 persons died and 37 were injured. This blast occurred at 3.13 PM. The Nana Patekar, Raaj Kumar movie Tirangaa was playing at the hall. The movie started at 3.00 pm a little after the earlier show had finished. There were 881 spectators in the hall. Shantaram later recalled that had the bomb gone off during the change over there would have been hundreds of casualties.
