= Achrekar =

Achrekar (Marathi: आचरेकर) is a Marathi surname. Notable people with the surname include:

- Bharati Achrekar (born 1957), Indian actress
- Ramakant Achrekar (1932–2019), Indian cricket coach
