= Suman Ramesh Tulsiani =

Suman Ramesh Tulsiani may refer to:

- Suman Ramesh Tulsiani Technical Campus - Faculty of Engineering, an engineering college in Kamshet, Pune, Maharashtra, India
- Shushrusha's Suman Ramesh Tulsiani Hospital, hospital in Vikhroli, Mumbai, India
