= Shivaji Mandir =

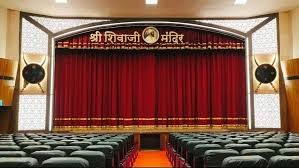
Auditorium at the Shri Shivaji Mandir Natyagruha, Dadar

Shri Shivaji Mandir is a theatre auditorium located in Dadar, Mumbai, India. Opened on 3 May 1965 as the first closed auditorium in Dadar, the theater remains a landmark.

== See also ==
- Prithvi Theatre
- Dadar Shivaji Park
- Marathi Theatre
