= Shushrusha's Suman Ramesh Tulsiani Hospital =

Shushrusha's Suman Ramesh Tulsiani Hospital Vikhroli, Mumbai

Geography
- Location: 201, Rd Number 1, Kannamwar Nagar I, Vikhroli, Mumbai, Maharashtra 400083, India., Mumbai, Maharashtra, India

Organisation
- Care system: Co-operative
- Type: Academic

Services
- Beds: 140 beds

History
- Founded: 2014 Main Division at Dadar Shushrusha Citizens' Co-operative Hospital opened 1964

Links
- Lists: Hospitals in India

Shushrusha's Suman Ramesh Tulsiani Hospital is a hospital in Vikhroli, Mumbai, India, founded in 2014. It is affiliated with the Shushrusha Citizens' Co-operative Hospital in Dadar, Mumbai.

It is located off the Eastern Expressway in Kannamwar Nagar, Atma Ram Marg, Vikhroli.

== Co-operative concept and organization ==
The Shushrusha hospitals in Dadar and Vikhroli are the only co-operative hospitals in Mumbai.

== Community services ==
The hospital provides no-cost services for prevention and treatment for physical and mental ailments. Services include (some services may be consolidated with Dadar division):

- Operation theaters
- Cardiac care
- In-home medical and nursing
- Emergency medical services
- Joint replacement
- Stroke clinic
- Cardiac ambulance
- Blood bank
- Pathology
- Ophthalmic
- Imaging
- Intensive care
- High dependency
- Pediatric
- Dialysis
- Outpatient
- Audiometry

The hospital serves the community by conducting free camps in the various fields for prevention, diseases and disabilities, both physical and mental.

- Smile Train Project, in association with the New York Chapter. Cleft Lip, Cleft Palate and related deformities conducted free of cost to all the patients admitted. During the year 161 operations free of cost in all respects have been performed. Patient's relatives coming from tribal areas have also been served free food during their stay at the hospital.
- Blood Donation Camps are conducted to meet demand. Shushrusha Blood Bank Registry, a voluntary donor endeavor is being developed as per new FDA rules. This registration would help the family to procure blood at a short notice.
- Socially Responsibility Activities: Efforts to reach out to street children, senior citizenry and underprivileged.
- Swaasthya, a monthly health magazine, an ongoing publication started at the main campus in Dadar: Editor, Dr. Rekha Bhatkhande, the medical director at Vikhroli and serves both campuses and the community.
- 'DILASA Centre, started by the hospital during 2010 for senior citizens, had various projects completed.
- Sisterhood of strength, Sakhi, The clinic for Women, Rekha Bhatkhande et al.
- Swachh Bharat Abhiyan with the senior citizens group on 14 May 2016 in Shushrusha Hospital by CSSC India, The Center for the Study of Social change.
