= Jhunka =

Vegetarian traditional dish of India

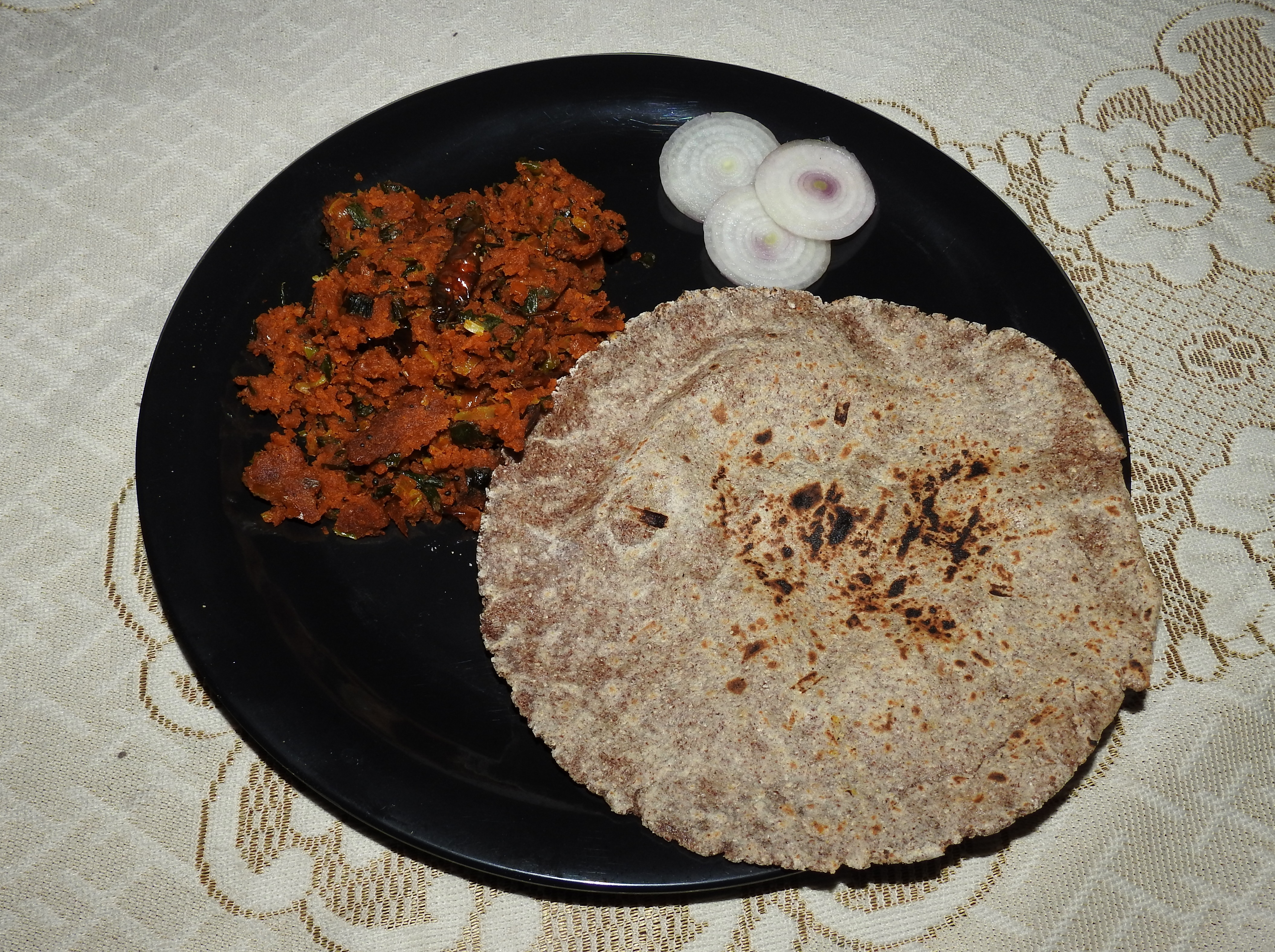
Jhunka bhakari

Jhunka or zunka is a gram flour porridge or a gram flour curry, similar to polenta. It is a traditional Indian dish prepared in Maharashtra, North Karnataka, and Goa. It is often confused with pithla or pithle; however, the latter can also be made from chickpea flour, is wet, and is mild to taste. When served with bhakri, the dish is referred to as jhunka bhakar or pithla bhakri. Pithle is also known as chun in the Vidarbha region of Maharashtra.

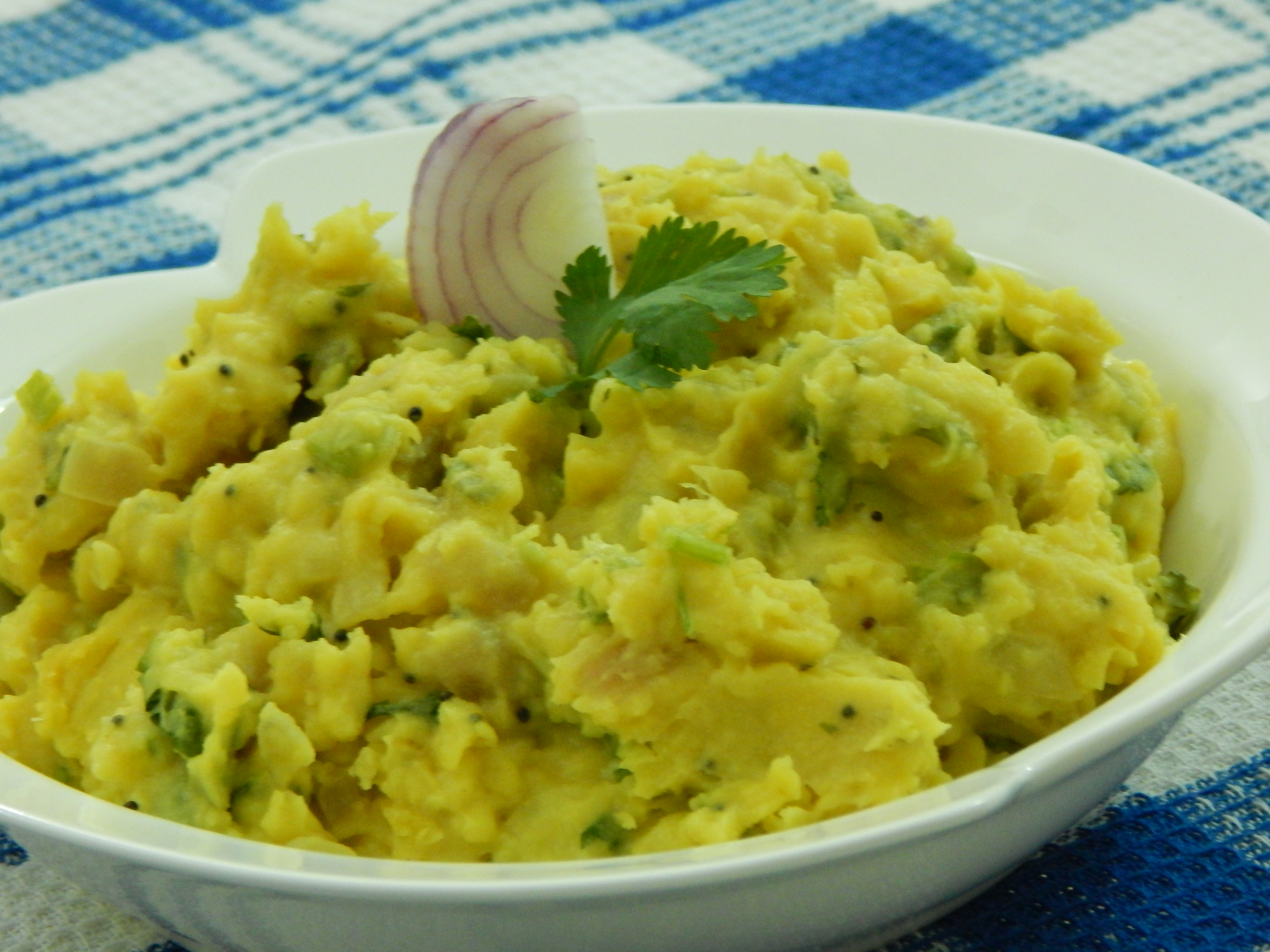
Pithla

Jhunka with bhakar is considered the quintessential peasant fare of Maharashtra. It is accompanied by kharda or thecha. In recent times, pithla bhakri has become an inseparable part of treks to mountain forts such as Sinhagad.

Zunka/pithla is considered a nutritious food because of its balanced content of fiber, protein, carbohydrates and potassium.

== Preparation ==
Jhunka is made by mixing gram flour (besan) with water to form a semi-solid paste. It is then sauteed in oil with assorted ingredients like green chillies, red chilli powder, turmeric, salt, fried onions, mustard seeds, ginger, garlic, cumin seeds and coriander leaves. Jhunka is traditionally served with bhakri and is also eaten with ĉapātī or rice.

== Political significance ==
In 1995, the Shiv Sena-Bharatiya Janata Party government launched the Zhunka-Bhaakar scheme in Maharashtra. The scheme was intended to address the state's socioeconomic crisis by allocating over 6000 stalls to the unemployed. The plan was not successful because the stalls were not able to provide the zunka-bhakar at the subsidized price of one rupee, so they began selling other foods instead. In 2000, the Congress-NCP government ended the scheme and the Supreme Court upheld this decision.
