= Portuguese Church, Mumbai =

Portuguese Church
- Church of Our Lady of Salvation; Igreja da Nossa Senhora da Salvação
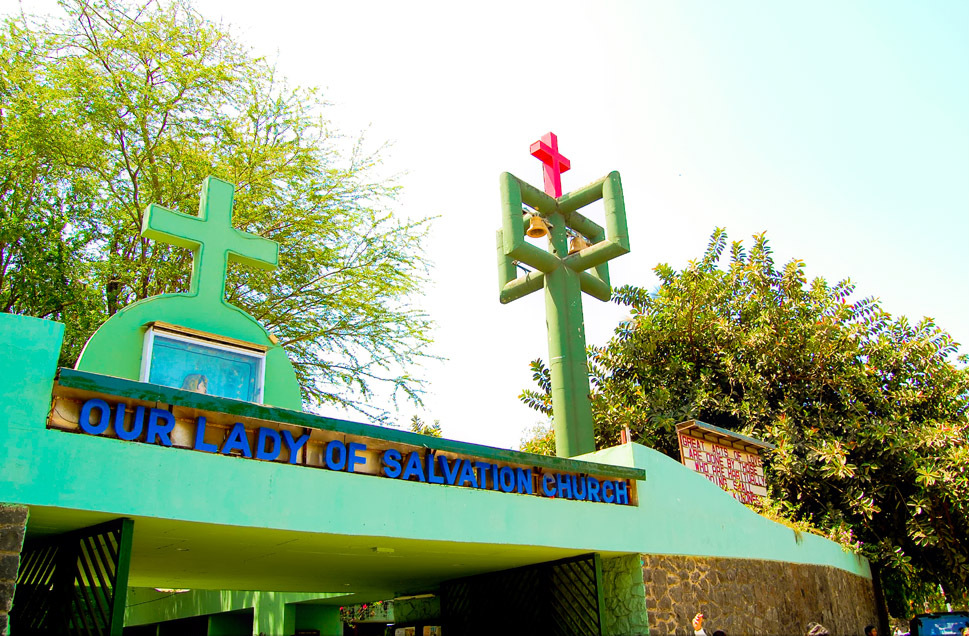
- Portuguese Church
- Portuguese Church
- 19°1′6″N 72°50′11″E
- Location: Dadar, Mumbai
- Country: India
- Denomination: Roman Catholic Church
- Website: http://salvationchurch.in/

History
- Status: Parish Church
- Founded: 1596

Architecture
- Functional status: Active
- Architect: Charles Correa
- Groundbreaking: 2 February 1973

Administration
- Archdiocese: Archdiocese of Mumbai

Clergy
- Archbishop: Oswald Cardinal Gracias
- Priest: Fr. Joel Fernandes Fr. Leslie Almeida Fr. John Rumao

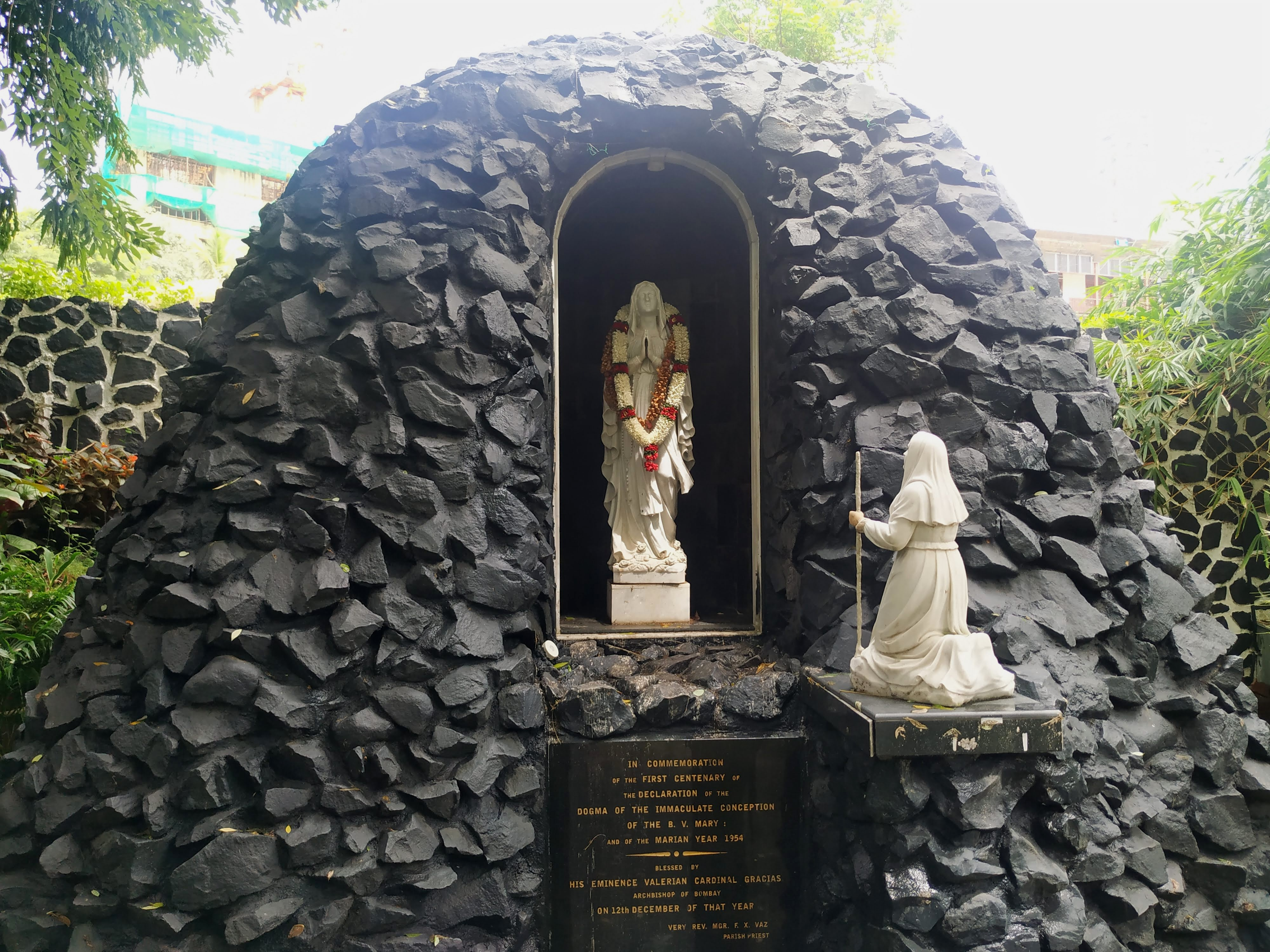
The Church Grotto

The Church of Our Lady of Salvation, popularly referred to as Portuguese Church, is one of the oldest churches in Mumbai, India. It is located on S. K. Bole Road in Dadar. The church was originally built by the Portuguese Franciscans who called it Nossa Senhora da Salvação (Our Lady of Salvation). The present structure, designed by famous Indian architect Charles Correa, was constructed between 1974 and 1977.

== History ==
The church of Our Lady of Salvation is believed by historians to be the city's oldest church, having existed as early as 1512. It was built by the Portuguese Franciscan Missionaries. It was later rebuilt as a larger church in 1651.

In 1974, Charles Correa, was commissioned to design the new building. Working with him on the project were engineer P G Nair and builder Abbas Jasdenwalla. Correa's design consisted of a series of interlinked spaces, some covered and others open to the sky, functionally differentiated in an analogue of Christ's life. The old church's steeples, the choir loft, the ascending roof and ornate facade were replaced by conical domes connecting the sanctuary (altar), the nave (central aisle), the baptistery (baptismal font), and the oratory (shrine). The structure featured an exposed concrete exterior, minus the plastering. Correa also invited noted Indian artists M. F. Husain and Anjolie Ela Menon to contribute to church. M. F. Husain executed a painting on glass for the central roof. Husain divided the glass into several segments for a stained-glass effect and painted the Biblical story of the five loaves and two fish, and the death and resurrection of Christ. Anjolie Ela Menon got a painting done depicting Christ on the Cross for a side chapel of the church devoted to prayer. It depicts Mother Mary and St. John on the either side of the crucified Christ. She also painted Eve and Adam on both side of Chapel Altar. The Church building houses a medical centre, a fitness centre, an Alcoholics Anonymous facility and a separate help group for the spouses of alcoholics.
