= Samarth Vyayam Mandir =

Sports venue in Shivaji Park, Mumbai, India

Shree Samarth Vyayam Mandir, a pioneer physical education institution located in Shivaji Park, in the heart of Mumbai, has worked in this field for the last 73 years. About 1200 children engage in activities each evening.

The institution concentrates on indigenous games as well as contemporary sports disciplines like Mallakhamb, Kho kho, Kabaddi, Yoga, Gymnastics, Wrestling, Bodybuilding, Weight lifting, Athletics, Basketball, Volleyball, Judo, Karate and exercises like Lezim, Dand-Baithak, Lathi, Lakdi and so forth.

A unique feature of this training setup is that most of the teachers render their services in an absolutely honorary capacity. The coaches, basically the past students of the Institution, are engaged in producing not only the champions but also the future teachers who will in turn carry on the tradition and keep the motto "for the cause of sports" alive.

The institution has so far produced more than 1000 National champions in different sport disciplines and about 20 of them have been conferred 'Shree Shiv Chhatrapati State Sports Award' by the government of India. Over 30 students of the institution have represented the country in different International sports event.

The institute conducts two Yoga Centres for adult men and women, runs a Govt.recognised D.Ed.course as well as a part-time unaided Certificate Course in Physical Education-D.P.E. A library on sports and allied publications is also a salient feature of this institute.
