= Ramakant Achrekar =

Indian cricket coach (1932–2019)

Ramakant Vitthal Achrekar
- Born: 1932; Malvan, Bombay Presidency, British India
- Died: 2 January 2019 (aged 86–87); Mumbai, Maharashtra, India
- Occupation: Cricket coach
- Known for: Coaching Sachin Tendulkar, Ajit Agarkar, Chandrakant Pandit, Vinod Kambli, etc
- Children: Kalpana Murkar
- Honours: Dronacharya Award (1990); Padma Shri (2010)

Ramakant Vitthal Achrekar (1932 – 2 January 2019) was an Indian cricket coach from Mumbai. He was most famous for coaching young cricketers at Shivaji Park in Dadar, Mumbai, most notably Sachin Tendulkar and Amol Muzumdar. He had also been a selector for the Mumbai cricket team. He also won the Dronacharya Award in 1990 and Padma Shri in 2010

== Early life and career ==
Ramakant Vitthal Achrekar was born in 1932. His playing career was not as distinguished as his coaching career. He started playing cricket in 1943. In 1945, he played club cricket for New Hind Sports Club. He also played for Young Maharashtra XI, Gul Mohar Mills and Mumbai Port. He played in only one first-class cricket match, for State Bank of India against Hyderabad in the Moin-ud-Dowlah Gold Cup Tournament in 1963.

His life and his inspiring career have been documented by journalist Kunal Purandare in the biography, Ramakant Achrekar: Master Blaster's Master. The book has garnered critical praise from various publications, including the Wisden India Almanack.

== Coaching career ==
He founded Kamath Memorial Cricket Club at Shivaji Park. He coached and nurtured numerous cricketers, including the Test players Sachin Tendulkar, Ajit Agarkar, Chandrakant Pandit, Vinod Kambli, Ramesh Powar and Pravin Amre. He devoted himself in coaching to raising the standard of Indian cricket. The club is currently run by his daughter Vishakha Dalvi and grandson Soham Dalvi , he was also a legend in 1945 cricket.

It was Ajit Tendulkar (Sachin Tendulkar's elder brother) who took Sachin Tendulkar to Ramakant Achrekar's Cricket Summer camp to improve his batting skills. Anyone could come for a trial at the camp and then, it was Achrekar's discretion to admit or reject the candidate.

Sachin Tendulkar had never batted at the nets before and felt somewhat overawed with so many people around. And when Achrekar asked him to bat, he was not at all comfortable. With Achrekar looking at him closely, he failed to make an impact and was a disappointment. Soon after he had finished batting, Achrekar called Ajit aside and informed him that he(Sachin) was perhaps too young to make to the camp and he should bring Sachin back when he was a little older.

Tendulkar and Achrekar posing with the Bharat Ratna in 2014

Ajit mentioned to Achrekar that Sachin was nervous and that he should give Sachin one more opportunity in 30 minutes time. However, while doing so, Achrekar should pretend to go away and look at his batting from a distance. He agreed and things changed. Sachin was asked to bat again in some time and without Achrekar's trained eyes scrutinizing him, he was at ease. He soon started to hit the ball well and Achrekar immediately agreed to let him join the camp.

== Illness and death ==
Ramakant Achrekar died on 2 January 2019, due to old-age ailments. Numerous famous cricket personalities including Sachin Tendulkar were present for the funeral.

== Awards and recognition ==
- In 1990, he was honoured with Dronacharya Award for his services to cricket coaching.
- In 2010, he was conferred with Padma Shri, one of the country's highest civilian awards in sports category at the Rashtrapati Bhavan in New Delhi on 7 April 2010 by the then Indian President Pratibha Patil.
- In 2010, on 12 February, he was awarded the 'Lifetime Achievement' award by Gary Kirsten, the then coach of the Indian Cricket Team. This award was part of the awards given away for various categories in sports by Sports Illustrated.
