= Ajit Agarkar =

Indian cricketer and commentator (born 1977)

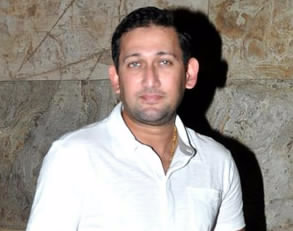
- Agarkar in 2014

Personal information
- Full name: Ajit Bhalchandra Agarkar
- Born: 4 December 1977 (age 48); Bombay, India
- Nickname: Bombay Duck
- Height: 5 ft 7 in (170 cm)
- Batting: right-handed
- Bowling: right-arm fast medium
- Role: bowling all-rounder

International information
- National side: India (1998–2007)
- Test debut (cap 216): 7 October 1998 v Zimbabwe
- Last Test: 13 January 2006 v Pakistan
- ODI debut (cap 111): 1 April 1998 v Australia
- Last ODI: 5 September 2007 v England
- ODI shirt no.: 68 (previously 9)
- T20I debut (cap 1): 1 December 2006 v South Africa
- Last T20I: 16 September 2007 v New Zealand
- T20I shirt no.: 68

Domestic team information
- Years: Team
- 1996–2013: Mumbai
- 2008–2010: Kolkata Knight Riders
- 2011–2013: Delhi Daredevils
- 2014: Cricket Club of India

Career statistics
Competition	Test	ODI	FC	LA
Matches	26	191	110	270
Runs scored	571	1,269	3,336	2,275
Batting average	16.79	14.58	28.75	17.50
100s/50s	1/0	0/3	4/16	1/7
Top score	109*	95	145	100
Balls bowled	4,857	9,484	18,132	13,322
Wickets	58	288	299	420
Bowling average	47.32	27.85	30.69	26.16
5 wickets in innings	1	2	12	3
10 wickets in match	0	0	0	0
Best bowling	6/41	6/42	6/41	6/18
Catches/stumpings	68/–	52/–	37/–	69/–
Medal record
Men's Cricket
Representing India
ICC Cricket World Cup
Runner-up	2003 South Africa-Zimbabwe-Kenya
ICC T20 World Cup
Winner	2007 South Africa
ICC Champions Trophy
Winner	2002 Sri Lanka
Runner-up	2000 Kenya
- Source: ESPNcricinfo, 13 September 2022

Ajit Bhalchandra Agarkar (pronounced [əˈdʒɪt aːˈɡəɾkəɾ]. Born 4 December 1977) is a former Indian cricketer and commentator. He was considered a bowling all-rounder. He is known for his fast bowling skills, particularly his pace and ability to take wickets. He is the third highest wicket-taker for India in One Day Internationals (ODIs). He served as chairman of the BCCI selection committee until October 2026. He has represented India in more than 200 international matches across all three formats of the game.

He was part of the Indian squads which won the 2002 ICC Champions Trophy and the 2007 T20 World Cup and finished as runners up at the 2003 Cricket World Cup and the 2000 ICC Champions Trophy. He was the Chairman of Selection Committee for the 2024 & 2026 ICC T20 World Cup and the 2025 ICC Champions Trophy which all of them India had won.

He played for the Delhi Daredevils (now Delhi Capitals) and the Kolkata Knight Riders in the IPL, and captained Mumbai to its 40th Ranji Trophy title in 2013. He made his Test and ODI debuts in 1998 and T20I debut in 2006. In 2013, Agarkar announced his retirement from all forms of cricket. Post-retirement, he began a new career as a cricket analyst. He holds the record for the quickest 50 in ODIs by an Indian coming off just 21 balls (against Zimbabwe in 2000).

== Personal life ==
Agarkar was born on 4 December 1977 in Mumbai, to Meena and Balachandra Agarkar. He has one sister, Manik Agarkar. Agarkar started out as a batsman since his childhood before he was entrusted to cricket coach Ramakant Achrekar by his father. On Achrekar's insistence, Agarkar shifted his school from IES to Shardashram Vidyamandir for the sixth grade. He developed as a batsman who could bowl a bit during this time while practicing at the Shivaji Park. He went on to perform consistently as a batsman scoring heavily in the inter-school Giles Shield tournament for the Under-16s making a triple century when he was 15. He carried the form into the Harris Shield under-19 tournament scoring consistently "showing signs of being another Tendulkar in the making." It was during this time that he began shifting focus to his bowling after it was "pointed out to [him] that it would be hard to make it into the Mumbai team as a pure batsman, and that he stood a better chance as an all-rounder". As a child, Agarkar idolized pacers Kapil Dev, Michael Holding and Ian Botham; later also taking a liking to Allan Donald.

Agarkar is an alumnus of Ruparel College in Matunga. He married Fatema Moize Ghadially and has a son named Raj with her. He resides in Narayan Pujari Nagar on the Worli Seaface in South Mumbai in Maharashtra.

== Bowling style ==
Ajit Agarkar was known for his knack for taking wickets and his ability to make breakthroughs at crucial moments. He held the record, at one point, for being the fastest bowler to reach 50 ODI wickets — a testament to his effectiveness and impact. While his economy rate occasionally came under scrutiny, his career figure of 5.07 runs per over was quite respectable, especially considering the attacking role he often played for India.

== International career ==
Agarkar made his ODI debut against Australia at Kochi, on 1 April 1998. He took the wicket of Adam Gilchrist in that match.

Soon after his debut, a 20-year-old Agarkar achieved his first Man of the match award in a crucial Coca-Cola champions trophy match against New Zealand taking four wickets including the crucial wickets of Stephen Fleming and Craig McMillan while India was defending just 220 on 17 April 1998.

The positive start to his early career, Indian fans were hopeful of him forming a strong bowling partnership with Javagal Srinath. Srinath had been sidelined by injury during Agarkar's 1st season and was the only successful pace bowler in the National Team. The emergence of Ashish Nehra in 1999 and Zaheer Khan in 2000 created further competition for pace bowling options especially in home conditions. Frequent injuries to Srinath, Nehra, and Agarkar meant India struggled with pace bowling resources.

While Agarkar remained a part of the team, he was not able to hold down a guaranteed place due to frequent injuries and severe competition for places especially after the emergence of Irfan Pathan in 2004. He was an important part of the hugely successful Indian team in 2002 and 2003 with Agarkar contributing some memorable performances with the bat and the ball. During this period, he was also a member of the Indian team which finished in the runner-up spot in the 2003 World Cup in South Africa, although he did not play in a single game throughout the tournament.

Amongst Agarkar's better performances were his performances in Australia in the Test series of 1999, and also in the test series in 2003. At Adelaide Oval in 2003, Agarkar took 6/41, to help India to win their first test in Australia in over 20 years. Agarkar has performed better in ODI cricket, where he takes wickets regularly, although his economy rate is high. He has also had a number of good batting performances. He was the best Indian bowler in the one-day series during India's tour of West Indies in 2006.

As a batsman, Agarkar is one of the few players who scored a Test century at Lords against England during India's tour to England in 2002 when he scored 109 not out. Although India lost the test, his batting skills were quite noticeable. He also holds the record of the fastest fifty in ODI's for India when he scored 67 not out in 25 balls at Rajkot against Zimbabwe in 2000. However, his batting exploits have been frequently overshadowed by seven consecutive instances of no scoring against Australia, five in Australia and two at home. His first four dismissals also happened to have been on the first ball he faced.

He is currently the 3rd highest wicket taker (288) for India in ODI's after Javagal Srinath (315) and Anil Kumble (337). One of the notable performances in the domestic cricket came in the 2009–10 Ranji trophy finals against Karnataka in which he took 5 wickets in the second innings ensuring a narrow win for Mumbai.

On 16 October 2013, Agarkar announced his retirement from all forms of cricket just before the start of the 2013–14 Ranji season.

=== As an all-rounder ===
John Wright used to send Agarkar as a pinch hitter in ODIs up the order to increase the scoring rate. He demonstrated good batting skills with extra slogging. Some of his acclaimed knocks in ODIs are when he smacked the fastest 50 in 21 balls in 2000 against Zimbabwe and took 3 wickets as well in that match, in another knock his 95 against West Indies in 2002 at Jamshedpur when he was sent up the order at number 3. In the same season in 2002 he joined the group of few Indians to have scored a century at Lord's, when he scored a century in the first test of series batting at no. 8. He got a runner-up medal in 2003 World Cup.

=== Records ===
Early in his career, Agarkar broke Dennis Lillee's world record for the fastest 50 wickets in ODIs, achieving the feat from only 23 matches. He held the record from 1998 until 2009 when Ajantha Mendis achieved the feat from just 19 matches. Agarkar holds the Indian record of scoring the fastest 50 in ODI: he scored 50 off 21 balls. Agarkar also holds another ODI record, which is the quickest in terms of fewest matches played to take 200 wickets and complete 1000 runs. Agarkar achieved this feat in 133 matches breaking the previous record held by South African Shaun Pollock, who accomplished this feat in his 138th match.

During India's 1999—2000 tour of Australia, Agarkar set a record of five consecutive innings (seven consecutive innings against Australia) resulting in ducks (four of them first ball), which earned him the nickname "Bombay Duck". The wicket takers were Damien Fleming, Brett Lee(twice), Mark Waugh and Glenn McGrath.

== Domestic career ==
Agarkar represented Kolkata Knight Riders in Indian Premier League for three seasons. In the fourth season, he was contracted by Delhi Daredevils for US$210,000.

In February 2012 it was announced that Agarkar would captain Mumbai in the 2012 Vijay Hazare Trophy.

He was also the captain of the Mumbai team that won the 2013 Ranji Trophy. In the quarter-final, he scored 52* (from 53 balls) against Baroda to ensure a mammoth total of 645/9 declared. In the semi-final against Services, he scored 145 and made a 246-run 7th wicket partnership with wicketkeeper Aditya Tare (120) to rescue Mumbai from 169/6, and take the total to 454/8 declared.
