= Shushrusha Citizens' Co-operative Hospital =

Shushrusha Citizens' Co-operative Hospital Shivaji Park, Mumbai

Geography
- Location: 698-B, Ranade Road, Shivaji Park, Dadar (W), Mumbai – 400028. India., Mumbai, Maharashtra, India

Organisation
- Care system: Co-Operative
- Type: Academic

Services
- Beds: 200 Main Campus

History
- Founded: 1964–66 main campus 2014 Shushrusha's Suman Ramesh Tulsiani Hospital Vikhroli campus

Links
- Website: http://www.shushrushahospital.org
- Lists: Hospitals in India

Shushrusha Citizens' Co-operative Hospital is located in Shivaji Park, Mumbai. It was founded in 1966 by Dr. V.S. Ranadive as a hospital co-operative initiative.

== Community services ==
The hospital provides no-cost services for prevention and treatment for physical and mental ailments. Services include:

- Operation theaters
- Cardiac care
- In-home medical and nursing
- Emergency medical services
- Joint replacement
- Stroke clinic
- Cardiac ambulance
- Blood bank
- Pathology
- Ophthalmic
- Imaging
- Intensive care
- High dependency
- Pediatric
- Dialysis
- Outpatient
- Audiometry

Projects include:

- Smile Train: Cleft lip, cleft palate and related deformities are treated at no charge to patients.
- Shushrusha is a member of the Federation of Bombay Blood Banks.
- Sakhi, sisterhood of strength, the clinic for Women.
- Swachh Bharat Abhiyan with the senior citizens group, the Center for the Study of Social change.
- Swaasthya, a monthly health magazine, an ongoing publication started at the main campus in Dadar: Editor, Dr. Rekha Bhatkhande, the former Dean of Shushrusha and the medical director at Vikhroli and serves both campuses and the community.
- 'DILASA Centre, started by the hospital during 2010 for senior citizens, had various projects completed.

== See also ==
- Shushrusha's Suman Ramesh Tulsiani Hospital, Vikhroli
- Consumers' cooperative
- List of hospitals in India
