= Shivaji Park =

Urban park in Mumbai, Maharashtra, India

- Urban park
- Chhatrapati Shivaji Maharaj Park
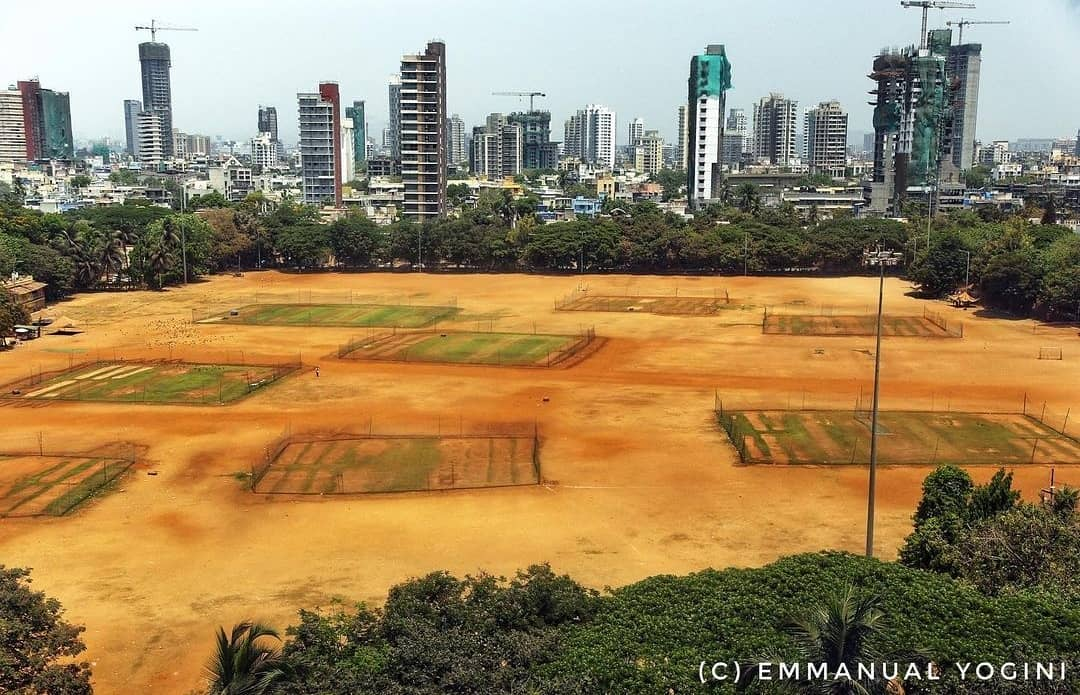
- Full View Of Shivaji Park
- Nickname: SP
- Map Showing Shivaji Park in Mumbai.
- Coordinates: 19.026724°N 72.838047°E
- Country: India
- State: Maharashtra
- District: Mumbai City
- City: Mumbai

Government
  - Type: Municipal Corporation
  - Body: Brihanmumbai Municipal Corporation (BMC)

Languages
  - Official: Marathi
- Postal code: 400028
- Area code: 022
- Website: www.shivajipark.com

Shivaji Park, officially Chhatrapati Shivaji Maharaj Park, is a public park situated in Dadar, Mumbai. It is the largest park in the island city. Similar but bigger in size to Azad Maidan and August Kranti Maidan (formerly Gowalia Tank Grounds), it is of historical and cultural value because of the political and social gatherings it has witnessed, both in pre- and post-independence Mumbai. The 113,000 square metres (28 acres) of open space is renowned as having been a cradle of the game of cricket in India. The park has a variety of sports facilities including cricket nets, Tennis court, a Mallakhamba area and a football pitch amongst others.

== Geography ==
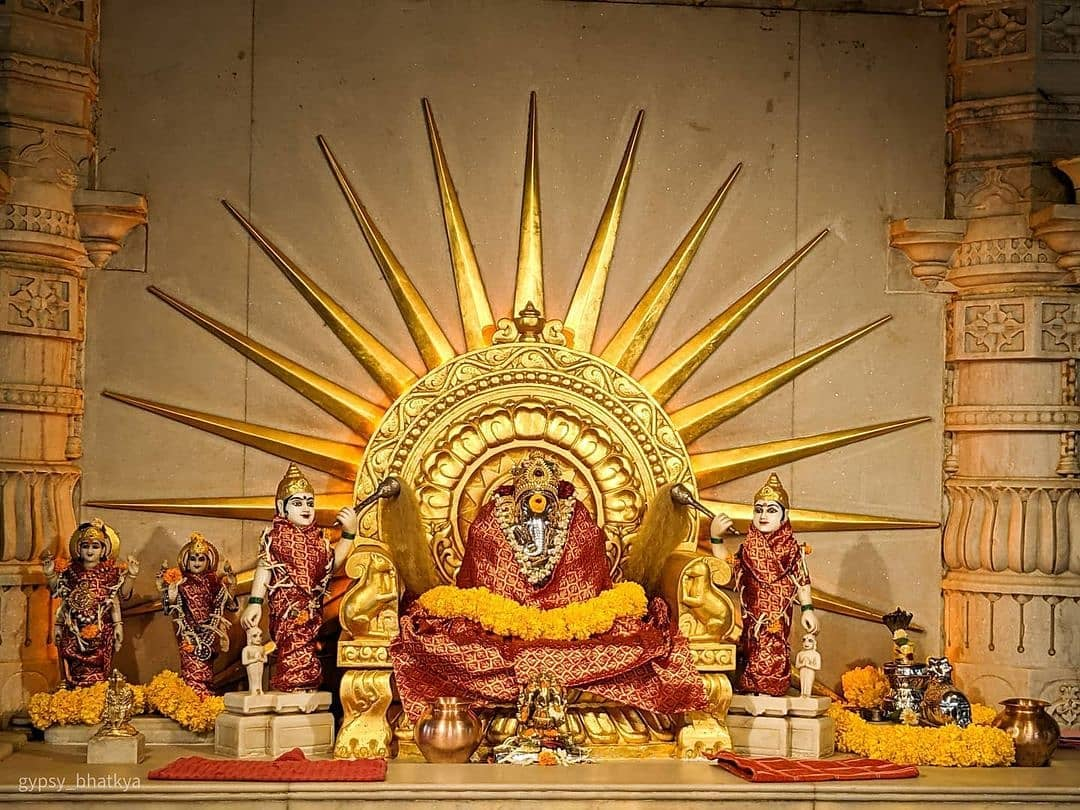
Udyan Ganesh Mandir at Shivaji Park

The open ground or maidan is flanked around its edge by a katta, a simple continuous low kerb edging that forms a makeshift seat - a popular hangout for the young and old alike. The paved walkway around this perimeter is crowded with joggers and people taking walks. The inner circumference of the park is 1.17 kilometres (0.73 mi). The maidan area covers 112,937 square metres (27.907 acres), more than half of which is occupied by 31 tenants, the largest being clubs such as the Shivaji Park Gymkhana, and the Bengal Club. The remaining part of the ground and open spaces is available to the public for sports and other activities. Other structures dotting the periphery of the grounds include the Samarth Vyayam Mandir (a gymnasium), Shivaji Park Nagarik Sangh (established in 1947), a children's playground, a park for the elderly called Nana-Nani Park, or Grandparents Park, the Scout's Pavilion, a Hindu temple dedicated to Ganesh, and a community library. The walkway is lined with large rain trees.

The most prominent entrance to the park is the one on the east side, intended only for pedestrians. A bust of Meenatai Thackeray, late wife of Shiv Sena leader Bal Thackeray, has been placed at this entrance. Previously a bust of Ram Ganesh Gadkari was present at the same spot. Bal Thackeray himself was cremated here.

== History ==
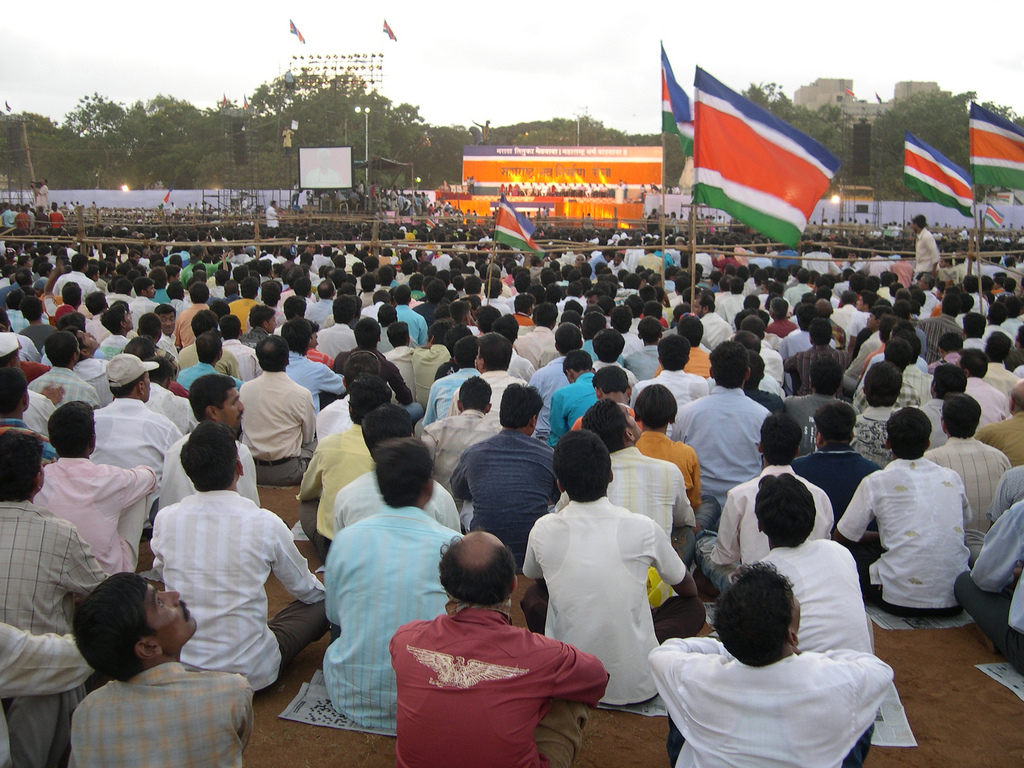
Political rally at Shivaji Park, 3 May 2008

The park was established in 1925 by the Bombay Municipal Corporation, during British Rule. It was known as the Mahim Park until 1927, when it was renamed after the 17th century king of the region, Shivaji, at the behest of a municipal councilor, Avantika Gohkale. The Shivaji Park Gymkhana, then known as the Dadar Hindu Gymkhana, opened its first Tennis court on the grounds in 1927 and inaugurated its pavilion in November 1931.

Besides being a venue for gatherings of freedom fighters in British India, after independence in 1947, Shivaji Park was the focal point of the Samyukta Maharashtra Movement (the struggle for a consolidated Maharashtra) that led to the present Indian state of Maharashtra being formed in 1960. During this period, the legendary writer, journalist, playwright, poet and social leader Acharya Pralhad Keshav Atre led this movement, addressing crowds of hundreds of thousands at this ground, earning him the title of the 'Lord of Shivaji Park'.

Shivaji Park has been integral to the political gatherings of the local political party Shiv Sena, and has witnessed numerous other political rallies. In May 2010, the Bombay High Court declared the ground a silence zone after local residents filed a public interest litigation suit in September 2009, complaining about the noise pollution in the area on account of political rallies and gatherings.

The Brihanmumbai Municipal Corporation renamed the park from Shivaji Park to Chhatrapati Shivaji Maharaj Park on 12 March 2020.

== Statue ==
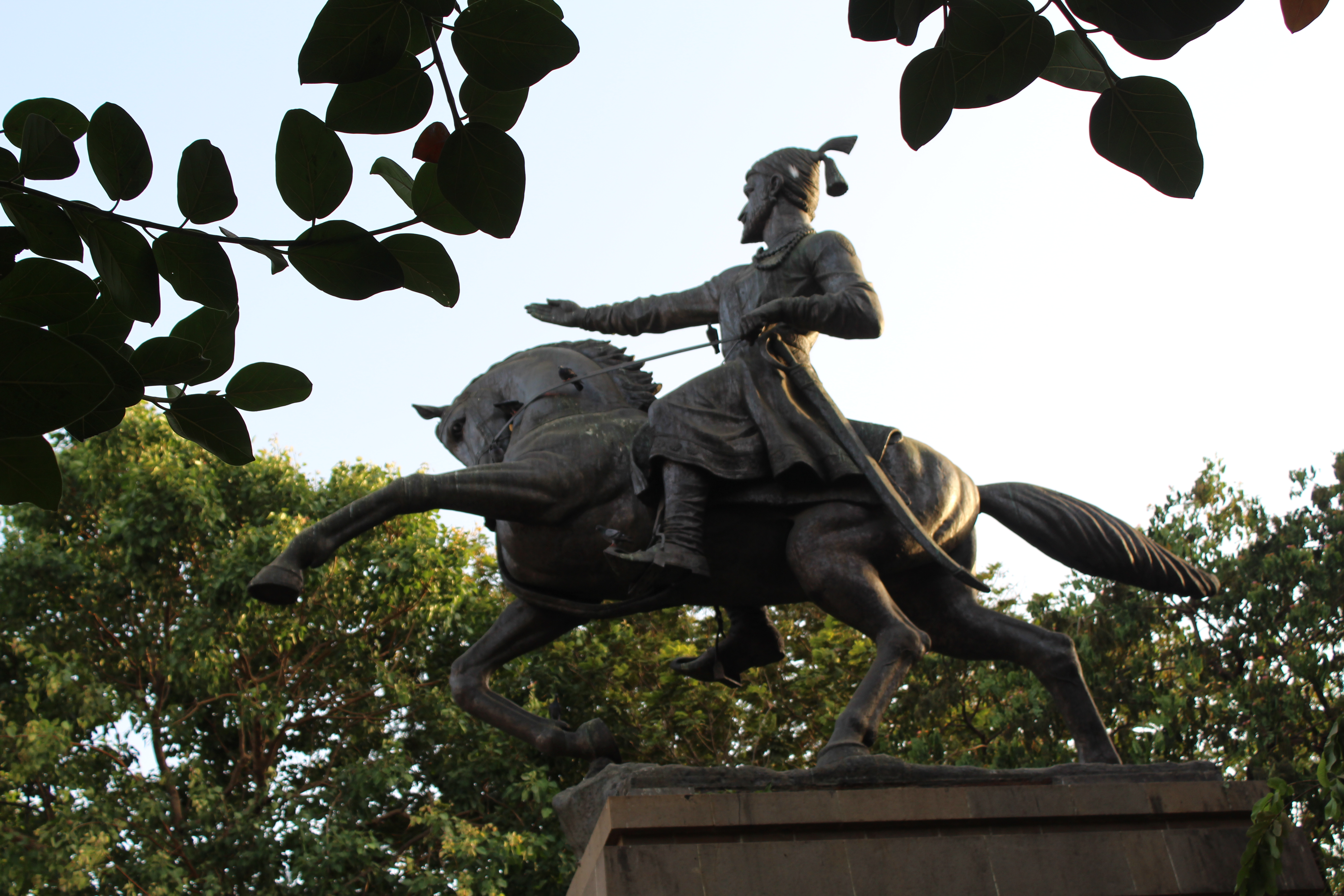
Chhatrapati Shivaji Maharaj statue at Shivaji Park

The statue of Chatrapati Shivaji, found on the western side of the park is one of the very few statues in which he is depicted without having drawn out his sword. Instead, Chatrapati Shivaji Maharaj is shown simply leading the way with his arm outstretched. Sculpted in 1966 using donations from the local population, the statue is a rare example of the pacifist policies of the then state government of Maharashtra. It was considered a sensitive issue by the government to let this statue not depict the usual confrontational posture of Chatrapati Shivaji Maharaj, who had fought many battles against the Mughal Empire.

== Cricket ==
Cricket Nets at Shivaji Park

Shivaji Park is renowned as the cradle of Indian cricket. It is home to eight cricket clubs, such as those of Anna Vaidya and Ramakant Acharekar, which produced several international cricket players for India.

Some famous players who have trained here are Sachin Tendulkar, Ajit Wadekar, Vijay Manjrekar, Eknath Solkar, Chandrakant Pandit, Lalchand Rajput, Sandeep Patil, Ajit Agarkar, Pravin Amre, Vinod Kambli, Ajinkya Rahane and now Prithvi Shaw.

== Surroundings ==
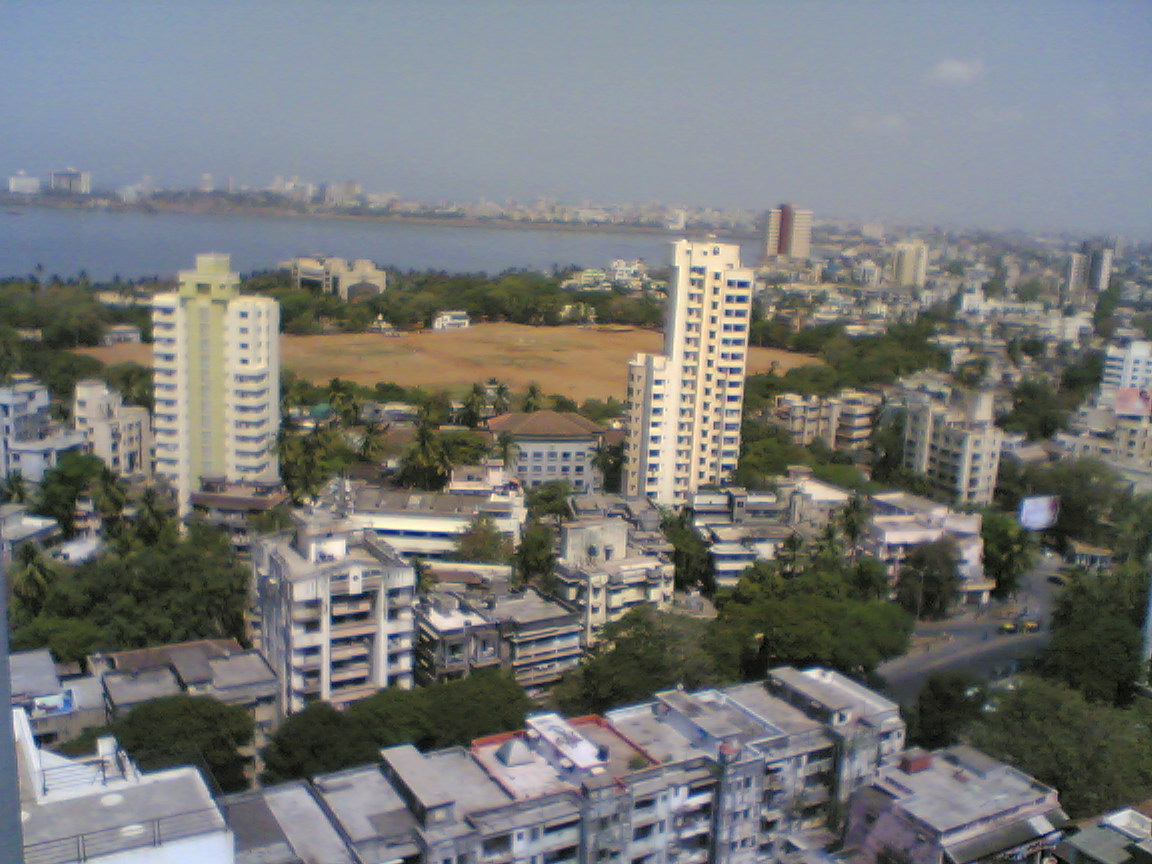
Shivaji Park Residential Zone with Shivaji Park ground and the Arabian Sea in the background

The area surrounding the park has many buildings dating back to the mid-1900s, and the Shivaji Park Residential Zone is some of the more sought-after real estate in Mumbai. The predominantly Marathi neighbourhood is home to well-known personalities from literature, theatre, commerce and sports.

Some notable residents include:

- Manohar Joshi – politician, former chief minister of Maharashtra, and speaker of the Lok Sabha
- Raj Thackeray – politician and founder of the Maharashtra Navnirman Sena
- Anup Jalota – musician and Bhajan singer
- Milind Soman – actor and model
- Sunil Prabhu – politician and former mayor of the city of Mumbai
- Ajit Agarkar – Indian cricketer
- Ajit Wadekar – Indian cricketer
- Sandeep Patil – Indian cricketer
- Sudhir Phadke - Marathi Singer and Music Composer
- Sachin Tendulkar - Indian cricketer
- Dada Kondke – actor and film producer
- Dilip Prabhavalkar – actor, writer and film director

== See also ==
- Dadar
- Shivaji Park Residential Zone
