= Dadar =

- Neighbourhood
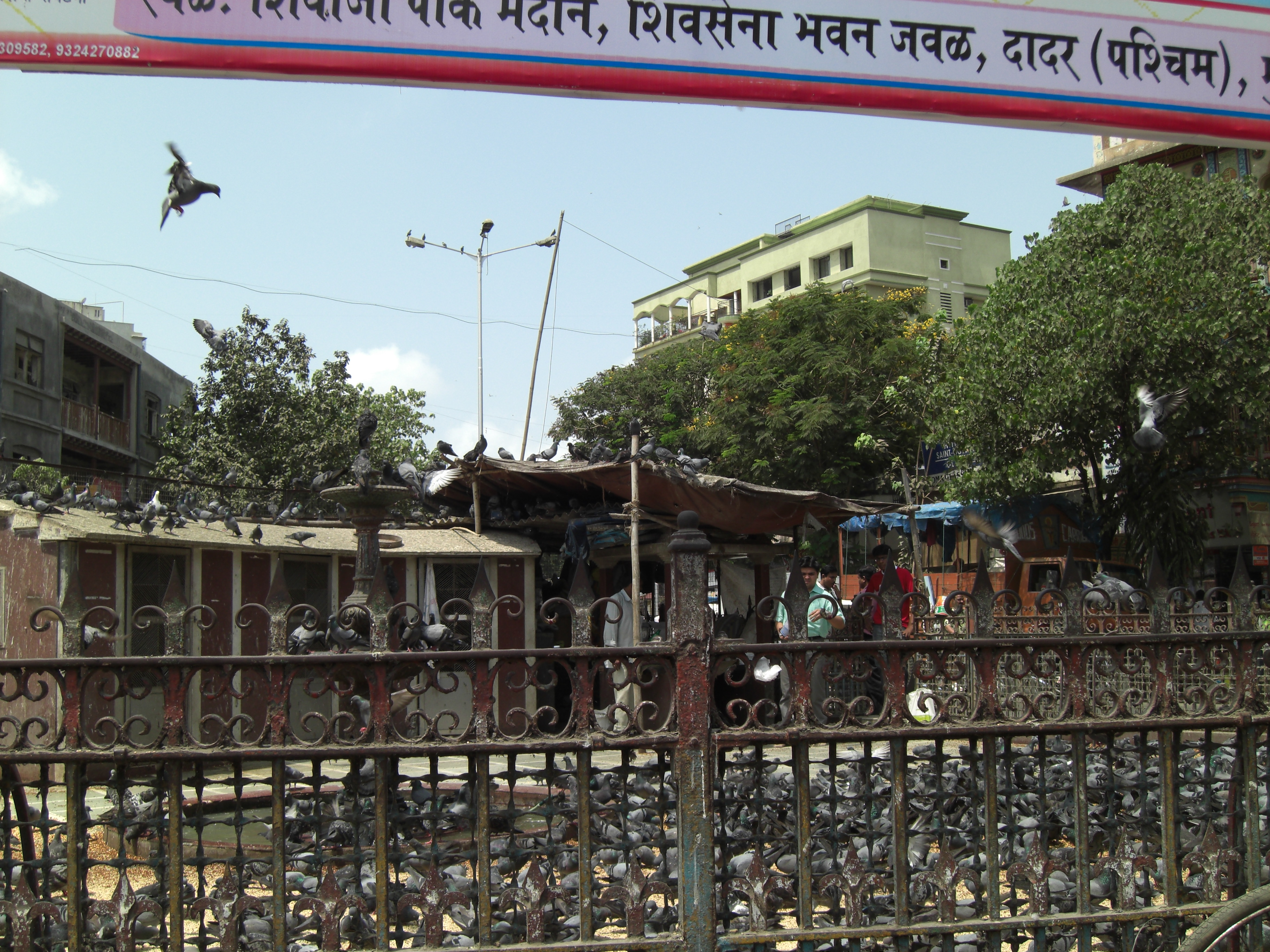
- Kabootar Khana, Dadar (West)

- Location within Mumbai
- Coordinates: 19.021°N 72.841°E
- Country: India
- State: Maharashtra
- District: Mumbai City
- City: Mumbai

Government
  - Type: Municipal Corporation
  - Body: Brihanmumbai Municipal Corporation (MCGM)

Languages
  - Official: Marathi
  - Native: Marathi

Languages
- Time zone: UTC+5:30 (IST)
- PIN: 400014, 400025, 400028
- Area code: 022
- Civic agency: BMC
- Lok Sabha constituency: Mumbai South Central
- Vidhan Sabha constituency: Mahim (covers western part of the suburb); Wadala (covers eastern part of the suburb)

Dadar ([d̪aːd̪əɾ]) is a densely populated residential and shopping neighbourhood in Mumbai. It is also a prominent railway and bus service hub with local and national connectivity. It is Mumbai's first planned area and is a hub for the city's Marathi culture.

== History ==
=== Origins ===
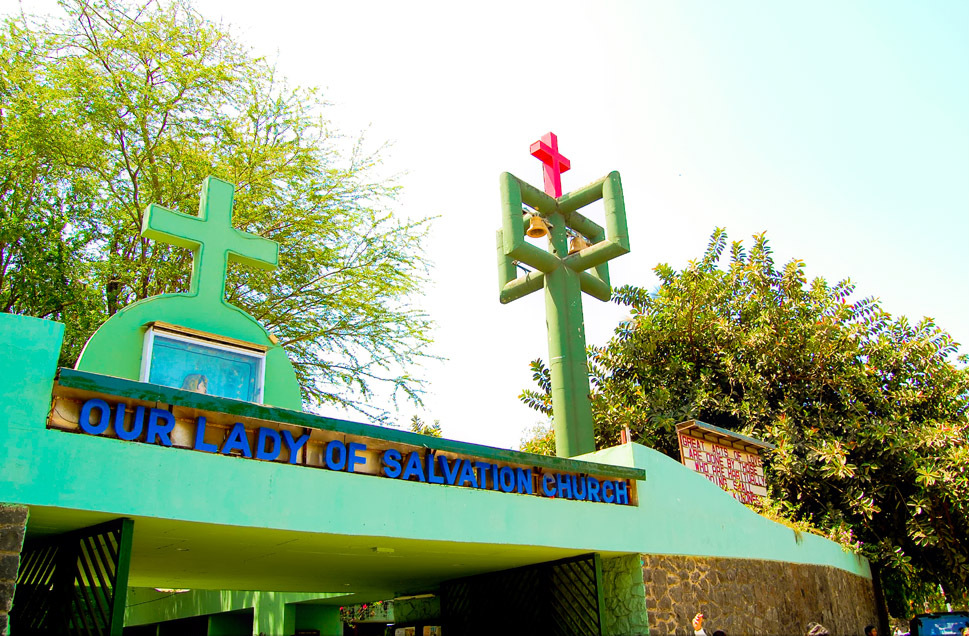
Portuguese Church, Dadar (West)

In the 16th century, the area was known as Lower Mahim, as it was located on the island of Mahim, one of the Seven Islands of Mumbai, which, after the Bombay Island, was the most important during the whole of the Portuguese period. The Portuguese Franciscans built a church here in 1596 called Nossa Senhora de Salvação, which is popularly known today as the Portuguese Church, and is a familiar Dadar landmark.

=== 19th and 20th century ===
The Dadar-Matunga-Wadala-Sion scheme of 1899-1900 was the first planned scheme in Mumbai. The Bombay Improvement Trust devised the plan to relieve congestion in the centre of the town, following the plague epidemics of the 1890s. According to the survey plan, 60,000 people were to be housed at Dadar-Matunga, and an equal number in Sion-Matunga. 85,000 people were to be accommodated in the developments in Sewri-Wadala.

Among the institutions moved to Dadar under the City Improvement Trust (CIT) plan were Victoria Jubilee Technical Institute, now known as Veermata Jijabai Technological Institute and King George School, now known as IES' Raja Shivaji Vidyalaya (now a collection of several schools). The plan regulated constructions and restricted building construction to three storey high, with open space between them.

Ramnarain Ruia College in 1937 and Ramniranjan Podar College was founded in 1939, completing Dadar's transition from a residential area to a more diverse neighborhood. Both colleges are run by SP Mandali. Dr. Antonio Da Silva High School, founded in 1851 during the British India period, and one of Mumbai's oldest schools, is located here.

During the cotton mill era of Mumbai, some key mills like Bombay Dyeing (Spring Mills), Gold Mohur Mills, Kohinoor Mills, Ruby Mills and Tata Mills were located in Dadar. During the redevelopment of Mumbai mills some of these were redeveloped or went defunct.

By 1937, the Shivaji Park and the surrounding areas were developed. The public space was to become an important stage in the political drama leading up to India's independence. Later, political history in Mumbai also unfolded in this park.

The Sharadashram society, as well as a school built in 1948-50, are the biggest landmarks of Dadar. Sharadashram society is Asia's first registered society as well as the first society in Mumbai.

During the 1993 Bombay bombings, a defused bomb was discovered in Dadar by Dr. JK Mandot, who also provided the Mumbai police with their first clue in the 1993 blasts probe, when on 13 March 1993, he alerted them about a dubious-looking Bajaj Chetak scooter (MH-04-Z-261) parked outside his dispensary on Naigaum Cross Road. The scooter, laden with RDX, had failed to explode, and was defused after Mandot's call to the police control room.

=== 21st century ===
Dadar has growing importance in the present day because of its railway routes. The old chawls are giving way to new high-rise buildings, thus changing the neighbourhood's skyline. The Khodadad circle and its surrounding buildings are a heritage site of Grade IIB.

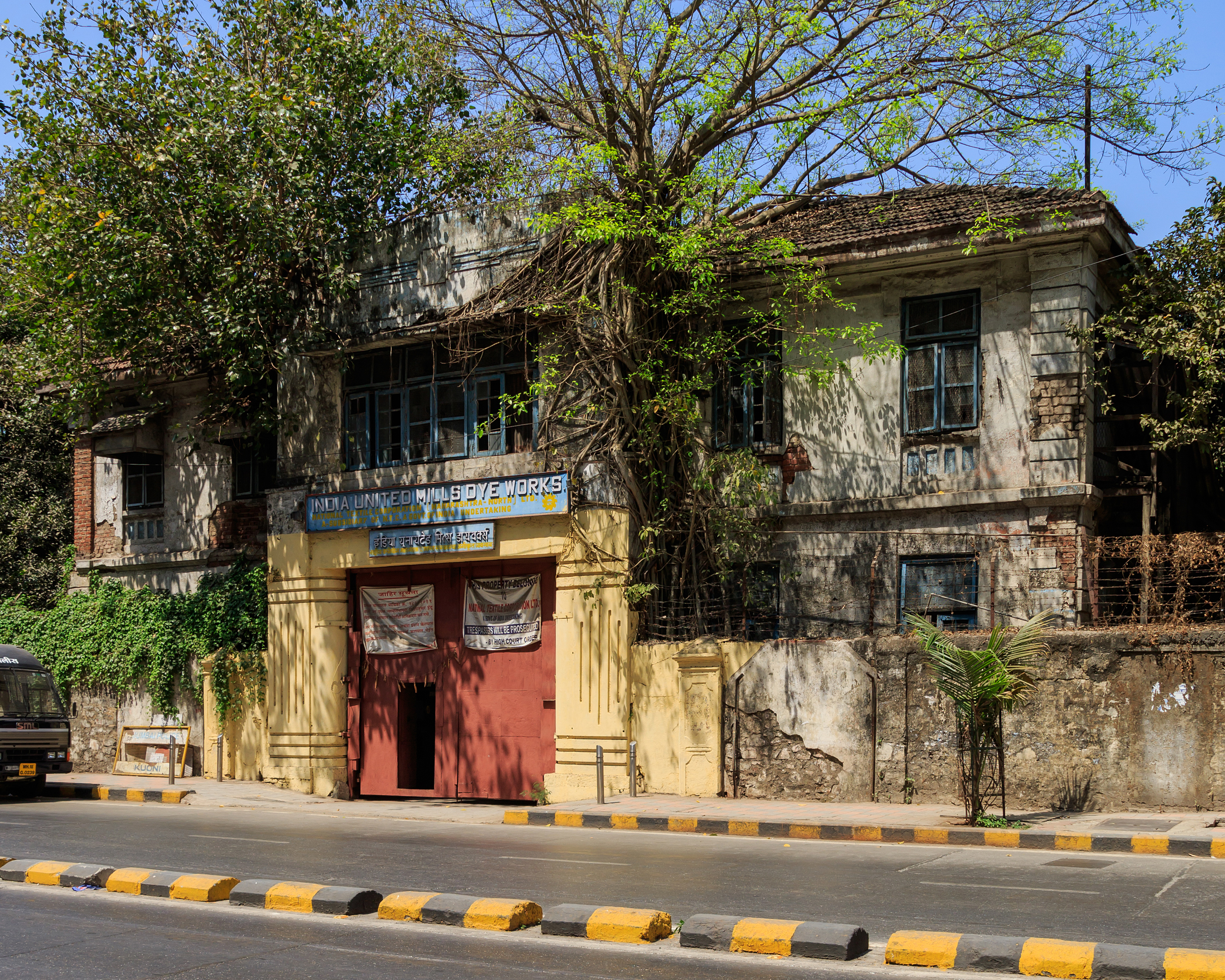
Former cotton mill in Dadar

== Neighbourhoods ==
- Shivaji Park
- Worli - Bandra Sea link view
- Dr. B.R. Ambedkar Memorial (Chaitya Bhoomi)
- Dadar is also home to the Mumbai Mayor's Bungalow, the official residence of the Mayor of Mumbai.

== Transportation ==
=== Rail ===
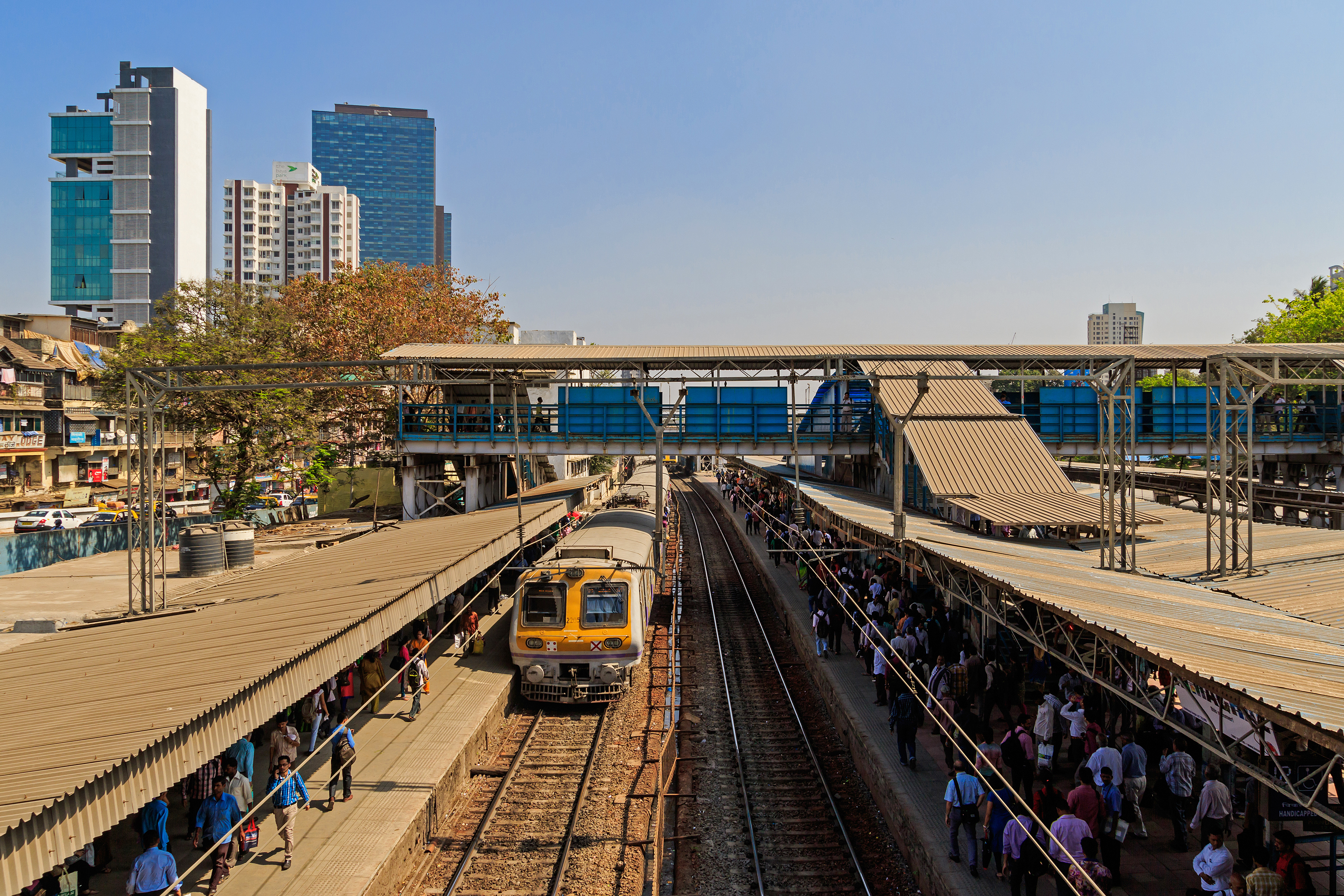
Dadar railway station

Dadar is a prominent railway terminus on both the Western and Central lines of the Mumbai Suburban Railway network. Being the only common railway station to both the Central and Western lines, it makes a transit point for many passengers traveling through Suburban Railway.

=== Road ===
Dadar east has been a key interchange point for those coming from Pune, Panvel and Navi Mumbai by road transport. A bus hub next to Dadar GPO is a destination point for many buses coming from out of Mumbai.

Locally, Dadar is well connected to other neighborhoods of Mumbai, namely Matunga, Wadala, Parel-Prabhadevi, and Mahim.

=== Metro ===
Dadar West is served by the underground Line 3 of Mumbai Metro.

== Culture ==
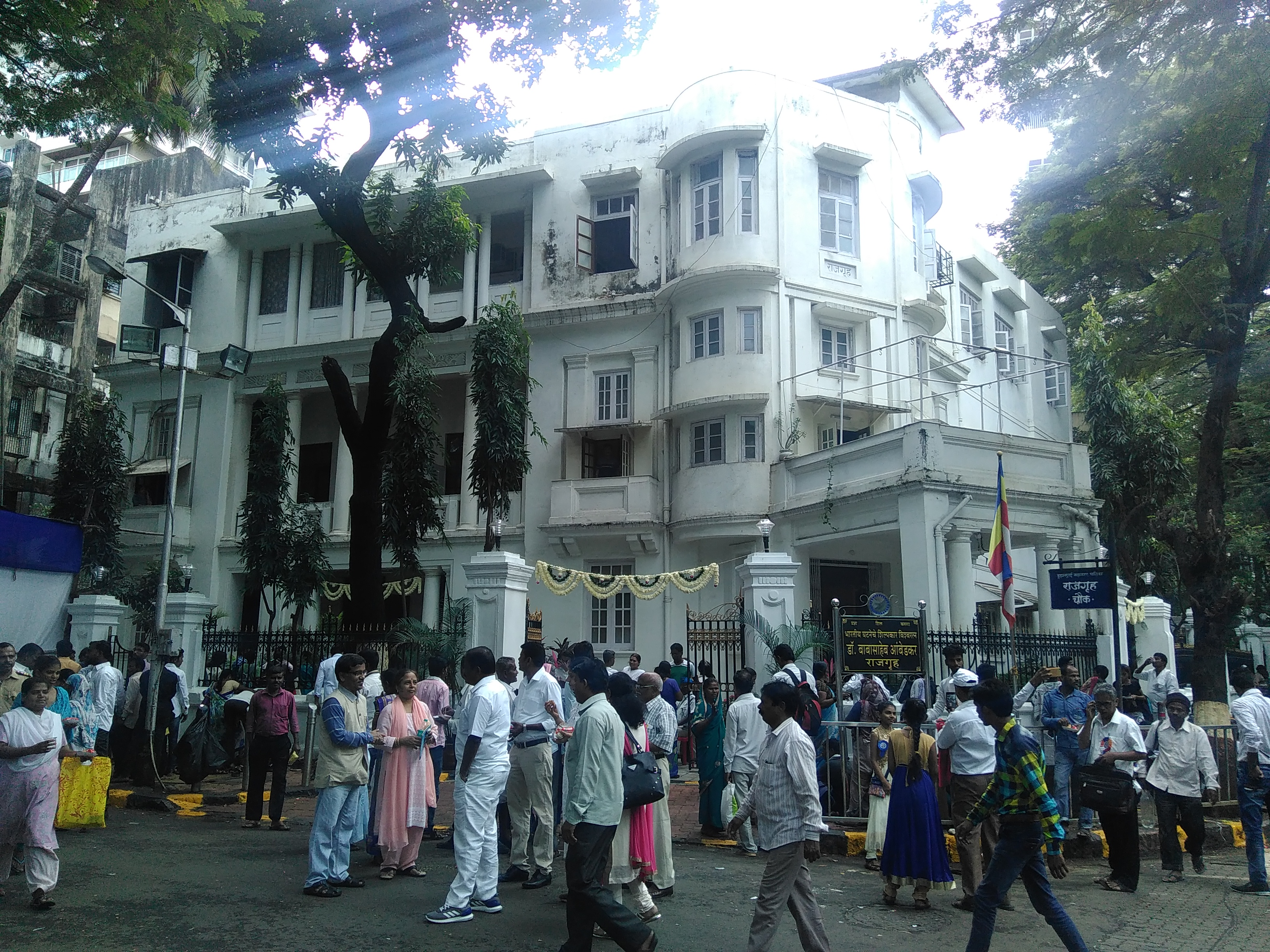
People visit Rajgruha, Dadar on B. R. Ambedkar's Mahaparinirvana day, 6 December 2017

Dadar has long been a cultural center for the native Marathi speaking local people and from the rest of Maharashtra. Being along the Konkan coast, like the rest of Mumbai, the native language of the region is Marathi.

=== Cinema ===
Dada Saheb Phalke (in recognition of whom the road Dada Saheb Phalke Road is named) partly shot his first film "Raja Harishchandra" at Mathura Bhavan, in one of his friend's residence in Dadar East. Apart from this studio, many other prominent film studios such as Ranjit Studios and Rooptara Studios were eventually built on this road.

There is also an active crowd that watches dramas. Shivaji Mandir is one of the few theatres in Mumbai that has catered to the middle class' interest in the dramatic arts. It was here that artists like Vijay Tendulkar, Vijaya Mehta, Mahesh Elkunchwar, Dr. Shreeram Lagoo and Nana Patekar found an eager audience.

Dadar has been also home to movie halls like Chitra Cinema, Inox Nakshatra and Hindmata Cinema. Plaza Cinema, a prominent theatre in west Dadar was damaged during the 1993 bomb-blasts/riots. It has now reopened and remains one of the theatres in Mumbai that show Marathi movies.

=== Restaurants and cuisine ===
Vada pav was invented outside Dadar Station in 1971, by Ashok Vaidya using the Pav (Portuguese word for bread). Apart from Vada Pav, Dadar is also popular for traditional Maharashtrian food like Batata vada, Thalipith, Sabudana Vada, Misal Pav, Usal Pav, Puri bhaji, Pithla bhakri, Piyush (a sweet drink) and Lassi. There are many restaurants like Prakash Hotel, Aaswad Hotel, Gypsy, Sindhudurg Hotel, Gomantak Hotel and Panshikar that serve Marathi food. Restaurants catering to Udupi, Punjabi and north Indian, Chinese, Thai and many other cuisines dot the landscape.

=== Park and gardens ===
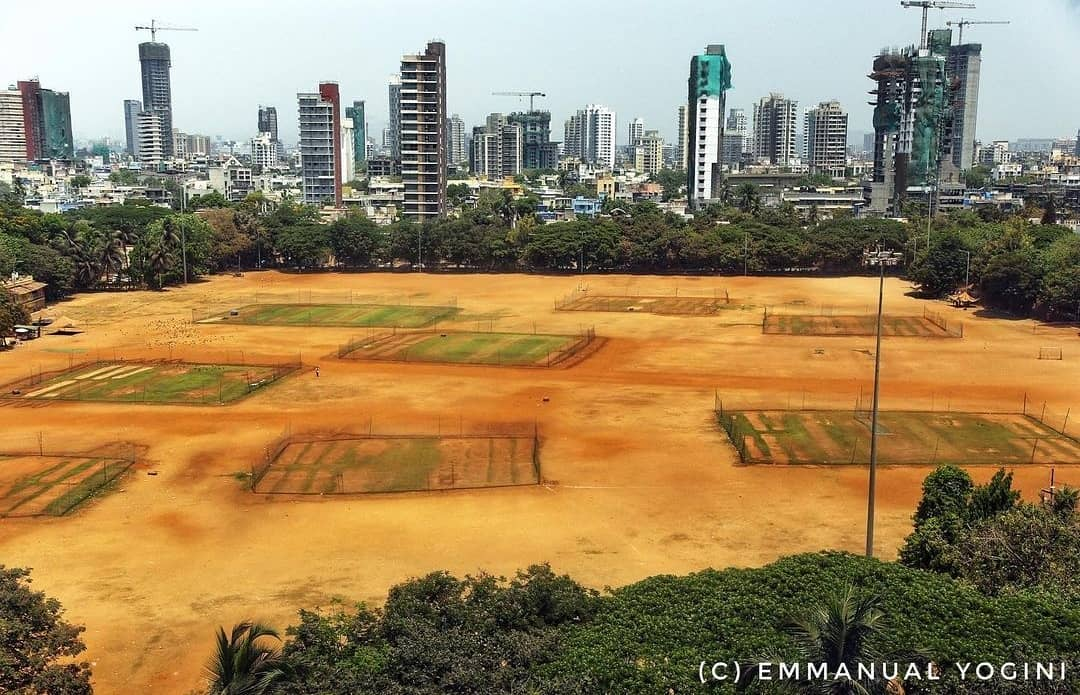
Full View Of Chhatrapati Shivaji Maharaj Park

Shivaji Park, one of the largest parks in Mumbai is situated in Dadar west and is the hub of sports activities, particularly for cricket enthusiasts. Many cricketers like Ashok Mankad, Vinoo Mankad, Vijay Hazare, Salim Durani, Ajit Wadekar, Sunil Gavaskar, Sandip Patil, Sachin Tendulkar, Vinod Kambli, Ajit Agarkar and Sanjay Manjrekar have been trained here. Spread across 112,937 square meters (27.907 acres) it houses Samartha Vyayam Mandir (gymnasium), Shivaji Park Nagrik Sangh, Shivaji Park Gymkhana (club), Mai Mangeshkar Balodyan, Aji-Ajoba Udyan, Scout's Pavilion, Udyan Ganesh Mandir, The Bengali Club with Kali shrine and a library. The walkway is lined with huge rain trees and stone wall for sitting, a popular evening spot for many residents around.

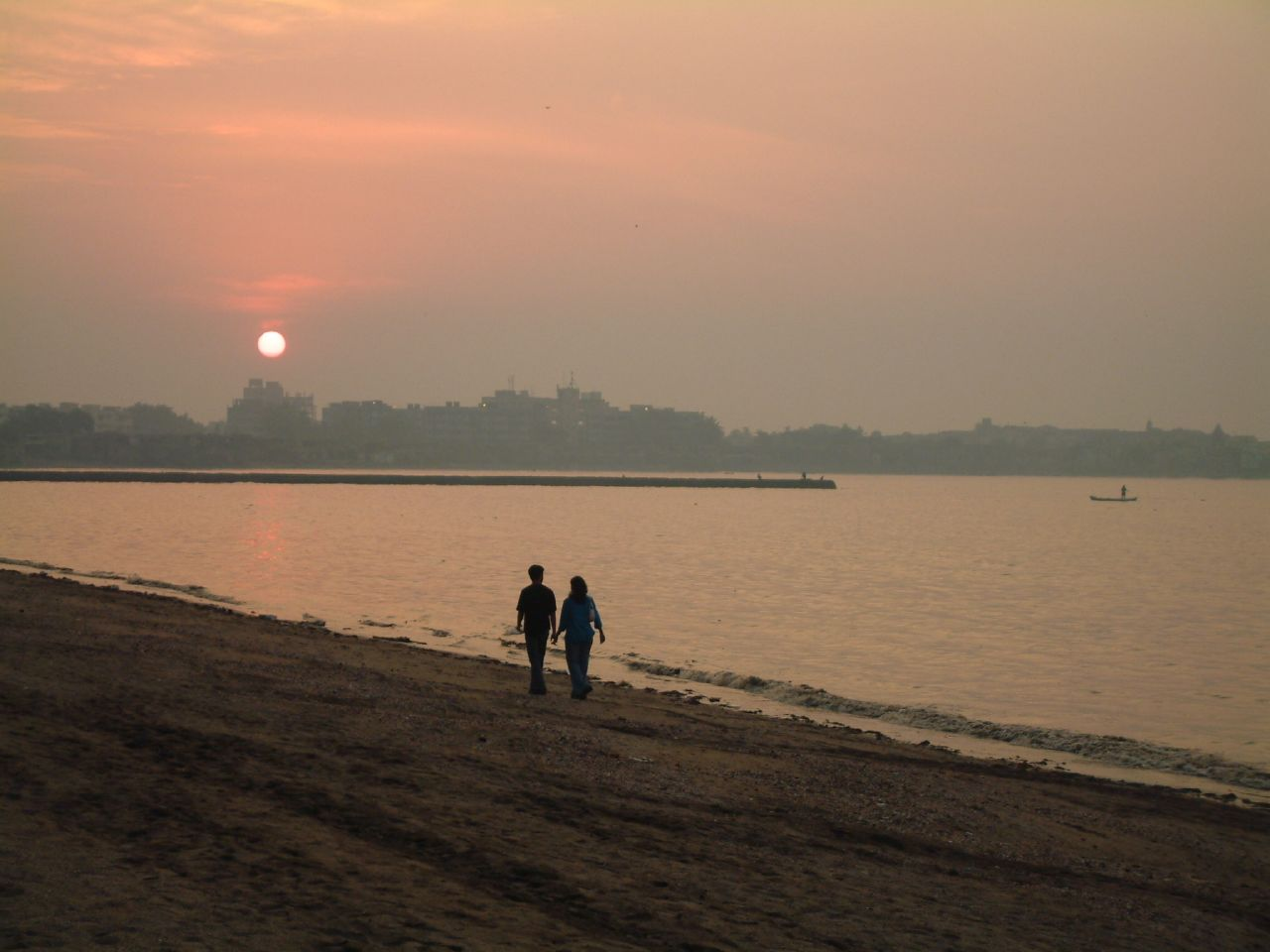
Dadar Chowpatty (beach)

Dadar Chowpatty (seashore) with its sea, sand and Mumbai chat counters is a popular getaway for families from the hustle bustle of the city. Some other parks include Five Gardens next to Parsi Colony, Veer Kotwal Udyan, Vaidya Udyan along Lakhamsi Nappu road.

=== Places of worship ===
Dadar has plenty of religious places including BAPS Swaminarayan Mandir (opposite Dadar east railway station), Rustom Foramina Agiary (Parsi colony), N C Narielwala Dadar Agiary (Naigam cross road), Kali Temple (Shivaji Park), Ganesh temple (Shivaji Park), Siddhivinayak Temple (Dadar), Jakhadevi Mandhir (Saitan Chowki) Sri Guru Singh Sabha Bombay (Ambedkar road), Shri Krishna Mandir Sabhagruh, Shri Mahaveer Digambar Jain Mandir, Hanuman Mandir (outside Dadar east railway station), Peer Bagdadi Dargah and mosque, Portuguese church (Dadar west), St. Marys Orthodox Cathedral (first Malankara Orthodox Syrian church in Mumbai) and Indian Pentecostal church.

Demji Padamshi Pathshala, a Jain educational facility, is also located in Dadar.

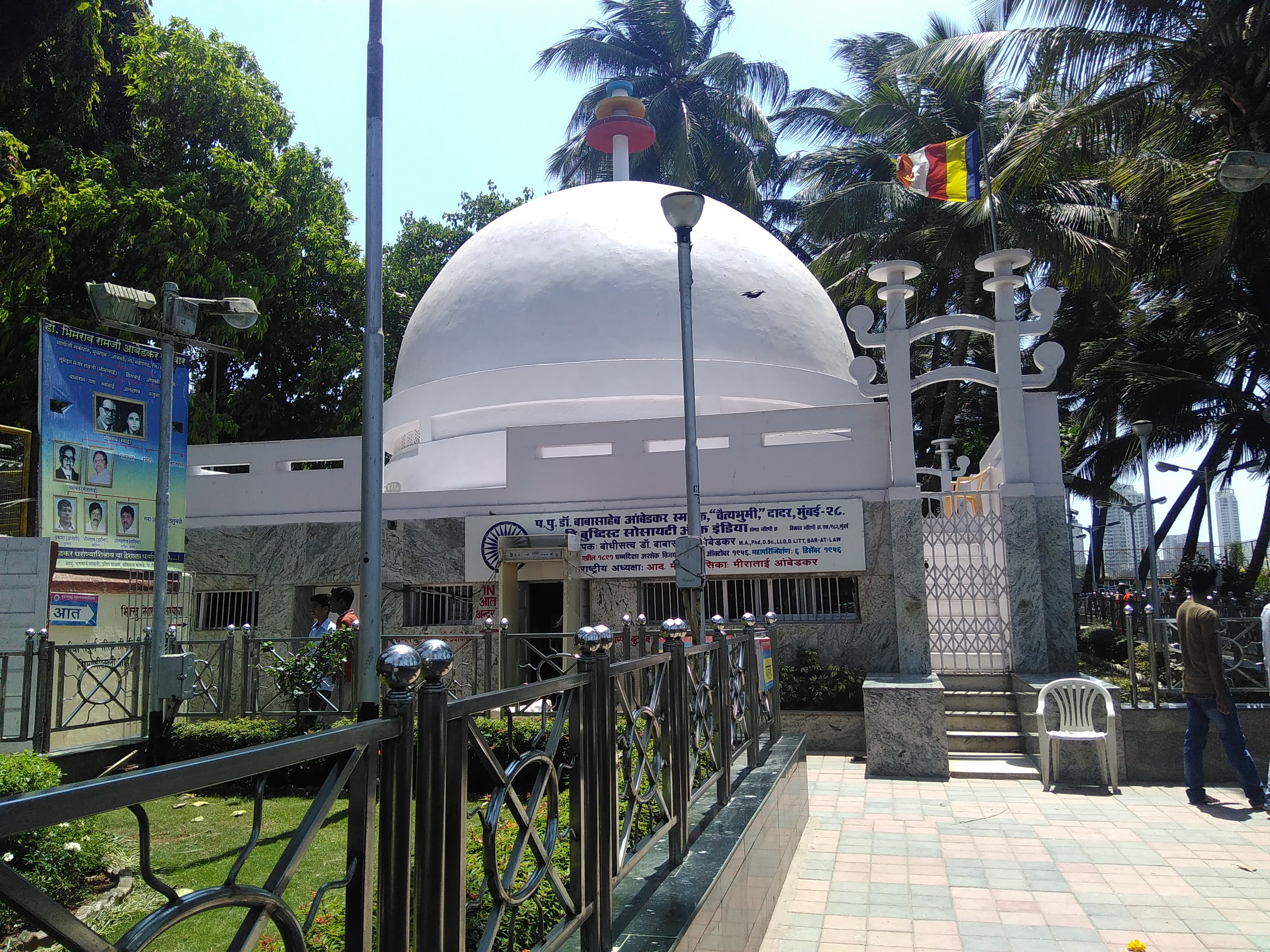
Chaitya Bhoomi, Mumbai – Samadhi place of Babasaheb Ambedkar.

Dadar is also home to Chaitya Bhoomi, memorial and place where B. R. Ambedkar, Chief architect of Indian Constitution was cremated. His death anniversary, 6 December, is observed as Mahaparinirvan Din when lakhs of people across the nation throng Chaityabhoomi to pay homage to him. A new memorial and statue is being built for Dr. Ambedkar at Indu Mill Compound near Chaityabhoomi

=== Cricket ===
Dadar area has hosted two famous cricket clubs: Dadar Union and Shivaji Park Gymkhana. Famous players for Dadar Union include Sunil Gavaskar, his uncle Madahv Mantri, the club's long time captain Vasu Paranjape, Ramnath Kenny, Naren Tamhane, Subhash Gupte, Ramnath Parkar, Dilip Vengsarkar, Sanjay Manjrekar. Shivaji Park Gymkhana team has been represented by Ajit Wadekar, Ramakant Desai, Baloo Gupte, Vijay Manjrekar. Sachin Tendulkar's coach Ramakant Acharekar trained his students at Shivaji Park. Shivaji Park is home to eight of the more famous cricket clubs. Apart from Tendulkar, Eknath Solakr, Chandrakant Pandit, Lalchand Rajput, Sandeep Patil, Ajit Agarkar also honed their cricket skills at Shivaji Park in Dadar.

== Education ==
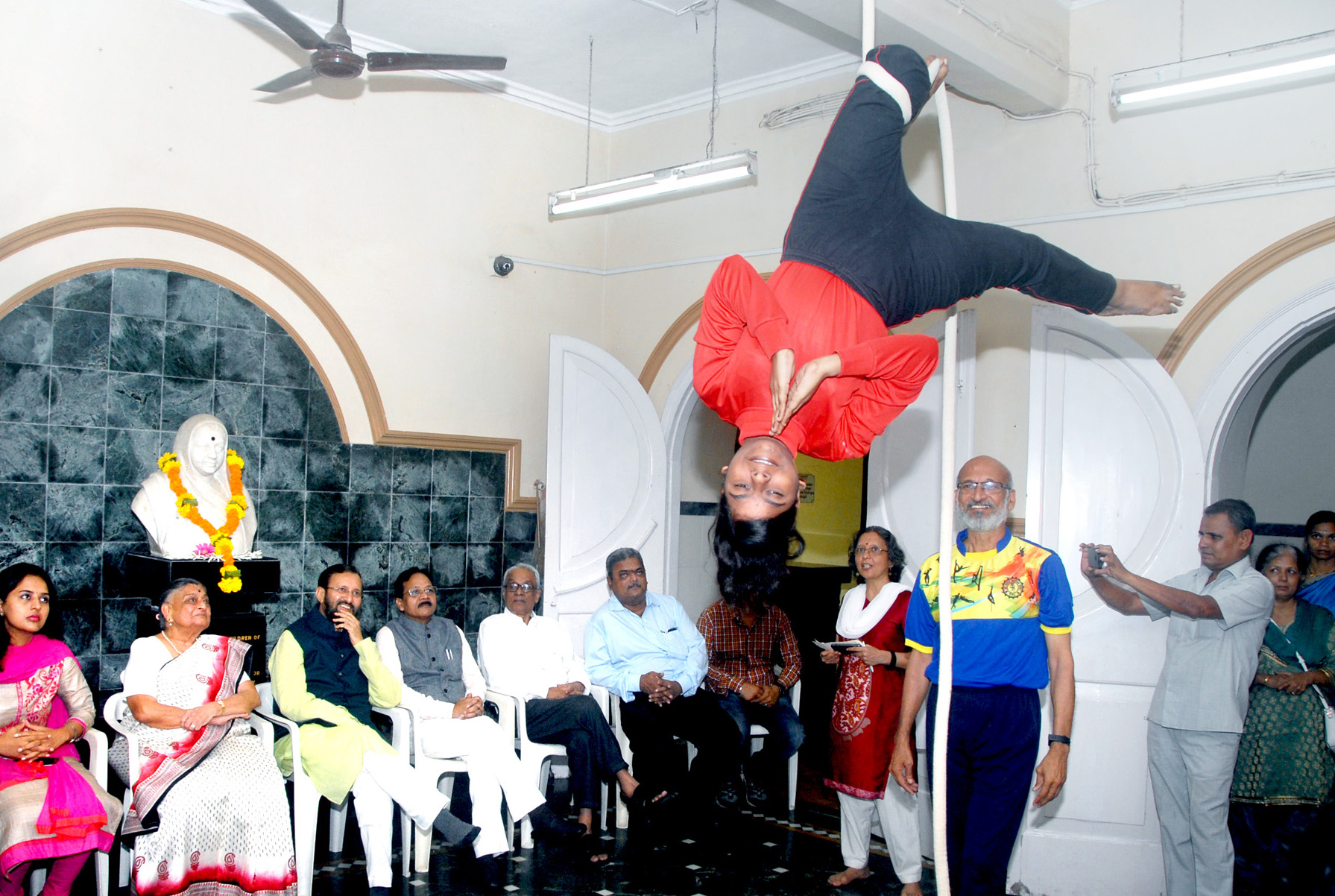
Rope gymnastic performance by a blind girl student, at Kamala Mehata Blind School

Dadar boasts some of the most reputed schools and colleges in Mumbai. Antonio Da Silva High School (estd 1868), King George School (now IES) (estd 1912), Our Lady of Dolours/Salvation (estd 1940), St. Paul's High School (estd 1945), Shardashram Vidya Mandir (estd 1949), People's Education Society (estd 1933) and Balmohan Vidyamandir (estd 1940) are some of the oldest schools founded during the British India period. Dadar East houses Smt. Kamla Mehta Dadar School for the Blind, a 100+ years old institution that was set up by American Marathi Mission to serve blind children.

Two of the most prominent colleges in Mumbai, Ramnarain Ruia College and Ramniranjan Anandilal Podar College of Commerce and Economics are in Dadar. Veermata Jijabai Technological Institute is one of the oldest engineering colleges in India and is in Matunga, adjacent to Dadar.

Dadar hosts specialised institutes like Institute of Hotel Management (IHM) and National Institute of Fashion Technology or NIFT (Ministry of Textiles, Government of India).
