= Dadar railway station =

Railway Station in Maharashtra, India

Dadar
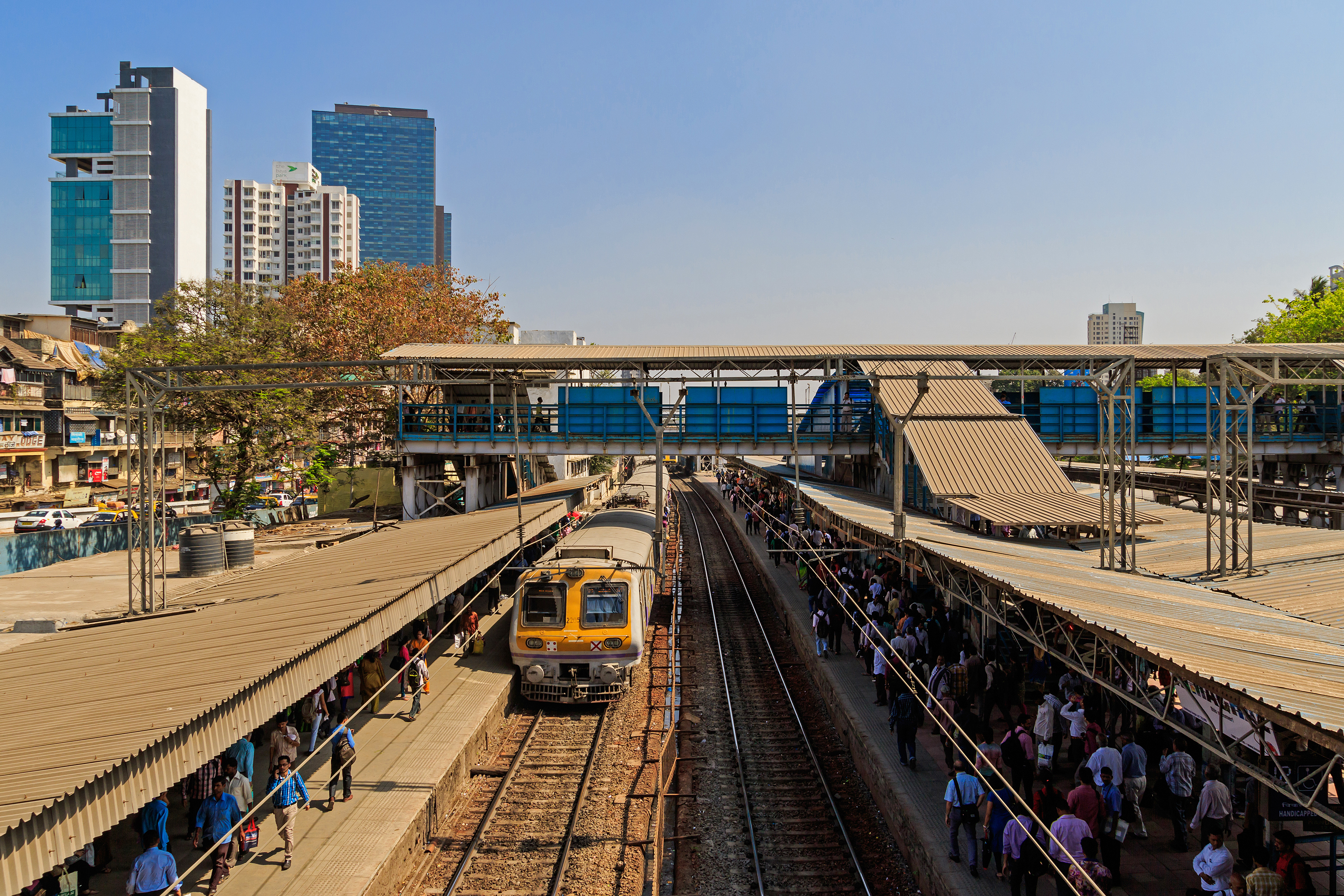
- Mumbai local train arrives on the western side of Dadar railway station

General information
- Location: Senapati Bapat Road and Lakhamsi Nappu Road, Dadar, Mumbai
- Coordinates: 19.018335°N 72.843214°E
- Elevation: 6.610 metres (21.69 ft)
- System: Indian Railways and Mumbai Suburban Railway
- Owner: Indian Railways
- Lines: Central line (Dadar–Solapur section); Western line (Mumbai–Ahmedabad main line)
- Platforms: 14 (7-Central, 7-Western)

Construction
- Structure type: Standard on-ground station

Other information
- Status: Active
- Station code: D (Suburban); DR (CR); DDR (WR)
- Zone(s): Central Railway zone Western Railway zone
- Division(s): Mumbai CR; Mumbai WR

History
- Opened: Central Line side- August/October 1853 (as Mahim Rd station) Renamed as Dadar- 1 November 1856

Passengers
- 2012–13: 2,90,537 (CR); 2,86,960 (WR) (Daily)

Services
Preceding station	Mumbai Suburban Railway	Following station
Prabhadevi towards Churchgate	Western line	Matunga Road towards Dahanu Road
Parel towards Chhatrapati Shivaji Terminus	Central line	Matunga towards Kasara or Khopoli
Route map
Location
- Location within Mumbai

Dadar railway station is a major interchange railway stations on the Mumbai Suburban Railway. It serves the Dadar area in Mumbai, India.

This railway station lies on both the Central line named as Dadar Central with station code DR and Western line named as Dadar Western with station code DDR. It is also a terminal for Mumbai Suburban Railway as well as Indian Railways.

Two roads are passes through parallel in the vicinity of Dadar railway station which is Senapati Bapat Marg on the Westside and Lakhamsi Nappu Road on the Eastside.

== History ==
The original Dadar railway station of the GIP Railway (today's Central Railway) was inaugurated sometime between August and October 1853 as Mahim Rd railway station. It was renamed as Dadar on "1 October 1856" Regular services to the station began in the same year on the GIPR line. A station named 'Dadur' existed on the first suburban train service of the erstwhile BB&CI Railway (today's Western Railway), when it began the service on 12 April 1867 (between Bombay Backbay and Viraur), suggesting the WR side station was established sometime in the 1860s.

On 1 January 1885, the BB&CIR and the GIPR signed an agreement that allowed the interchange of coaches and goods stock. The agreement provided each railway the privilege to use the others tracks via Dadur. BB&CIR was permitted to send its goods trains to Carnac Bunder on the GIPR side, while GIPR could use the Colaba Terminus station. Further it agreed that in the event of public interest, a local passenger train service should be commenced between GIPR's Victoria Terminus, and BB&CIR's Bandra station, via the Dadur Junction.

The station was among the first (along with Currey Road) to receive colour light signalling in 1920.

The Tilak bridge that spans over both the Western and Central lines was completed in August 1925, after 8 years of construction. It was named so after Independence. It was built to replace an old level crossing situated a quarter mile south of its present location.

The Dadar through cabin was converted to colour signalling in February 1936, following similar endeavours around the stations like Mahim, Bandra, among others.

On 10 August 1942, a large crowd gathered outside the station. This happened in the backdrop of the call for Quit India announced a few days back in Bombay, as well as the arrest of important leaders. The crowds barged into the station platforms, and people began greasing the rail tracks, and placing obstacles on them, to stop rail traffic. A police firing ensued, and several people were injured and killed.

The express train terminus on Central line side was constructed and opened on 1968.

During the India–Pakistan war of 1971 a Jawan Canteen was established in the station to serve Indian soldiers. The Canteen was conducted by Wadala Junior Chambers (Founder- Gangaram Joshi), under the guidance of Nanik Rupani, who was the President at that time. Trains began terminating and departing from Dadar from May 1974.

After decades, in 2009, the Midtown terminus of Dadar Western side was inaugurated for increasing more trains on the suburban route and long-distance route for decreasing a load of passengers. And the side elevated road which is parallel to Midtown Terminus connects to Tilak Bridge for direct taxis' and another vehicles' movement, was inaugurated in 2014. The cost for construction was ₹30 crore (US$3.1 million).

== Structure ==
Dadar railway station has 14 platforms. The first 7 platforms are for the Western side which consists of two platforms for the slow suburban route, three platforms for the fast suburban route, and the last two platforms as the terminus of the Suburban and Long Distance trains which are also known as Dadar Midtown Terminus. The platforms are numbered from 1 to 7.

The remaining 7 platforms are for the Central line, which consists of two platforms for the slow suburban route, three platforms for the fast suburban route with middle-fast suburban terminal, and the last two platforms as the terminus of long-distance trains which are also known as Dadar Central Terminus or Dadar Terminus. The platforms are numbered from 8 to 14, previously having been numbered from 1 to 7.

This railway station is well connected with multiple walk ways and bridges for easier access of passengers crossing on either side.

=== Station structure layout ===
G	North Entrance Street level	Exit/Entrance & ticket counter
P WR zone	FOB, Side platform | P1 Doors will open on the left
P WR zone	Platform 1	Towards → Borivali / Virar; Next Station: Matunga Road
P WR zone	Platform 2	Towards ← Mumbai Central / Churchgate; Next Station: Prabhadevi
P WR zone	FOB, Island platform | P2 & P3 Doors will open on the left Platforms 1 & 2 are dedicated for Slow Local trains | Platforms 3-5 are dedicated for Fast Local trains
P WR zone	Platform 3	Towards → Dahanu Road / Virar; Next Station: Bandra
P WR zone	Platform 4	Towards ← Mumbai Central / Churchgate; Next Station: Mumbai Central
P WR zone	FOB, Island platform | P4 & P5 Doors will open on the left
P WR zone	Platform 5	Towards → Dahanu Road / Virar; Next Station: Bandra
P WR zone	FOB, Island platform | P5 Doors will open on the right | P6 Doors will open on the left Platforms 6 & 7 are dedicated for Outstation Express trains
P WR zone	Platform 6	Towards → Dahanu Road / Virar
P WR zone	Platform 7	Towards → Dahanu Road / Virar
P WR zone	FOB, Side platform | P7 Doors will open on the left
P CR zone	Platform 8	Towards → Karjat / Kasara; Next Station: Matunga
P CR zone	Platform 9	Towards ← Mumbai CSMT; Next Station: Parel
P CR zone	FOB, Island platform | P8 Doors will open on the right | P9 Doors will open on the left Platforms 8 & 9 are dedicated for Slow Local trains | Platforms 9A/10 & 11 are dedicated for Fast Local trains
P CR zone	Platform 9A/10	Towards → Karjat / Kasara; Next Station: Kurla
P CR zone	FOB, Island platform | P11 Doors will open on the left | P9A/10 Doors will open on the right
P CR zone	Platform 11	Towards → Karjat / Kasara; Next Station: Kurla
P CR zone	Platform 12	Towards ← Mumbai CSMT; Next Station: Byculla
P CR zone	FOB, Island platform | P13 Doors will open on the right | P12 Doors will open on the left Platforms 11 & 12 are dedicated for Fast Local trains | Platforms 13-14 are dedicated for Outstation trains
P CR zone	Platform 13	Towards → Kalyan Junction / Pune Junction
P CR zone	FOB, Island platform | P14 Doors will open on the left
P CR zone	Platform 14	Towards → Kalyan Junction / Pune Junction
G	South Entrance Street level	Exit/Entrance & ticket counter

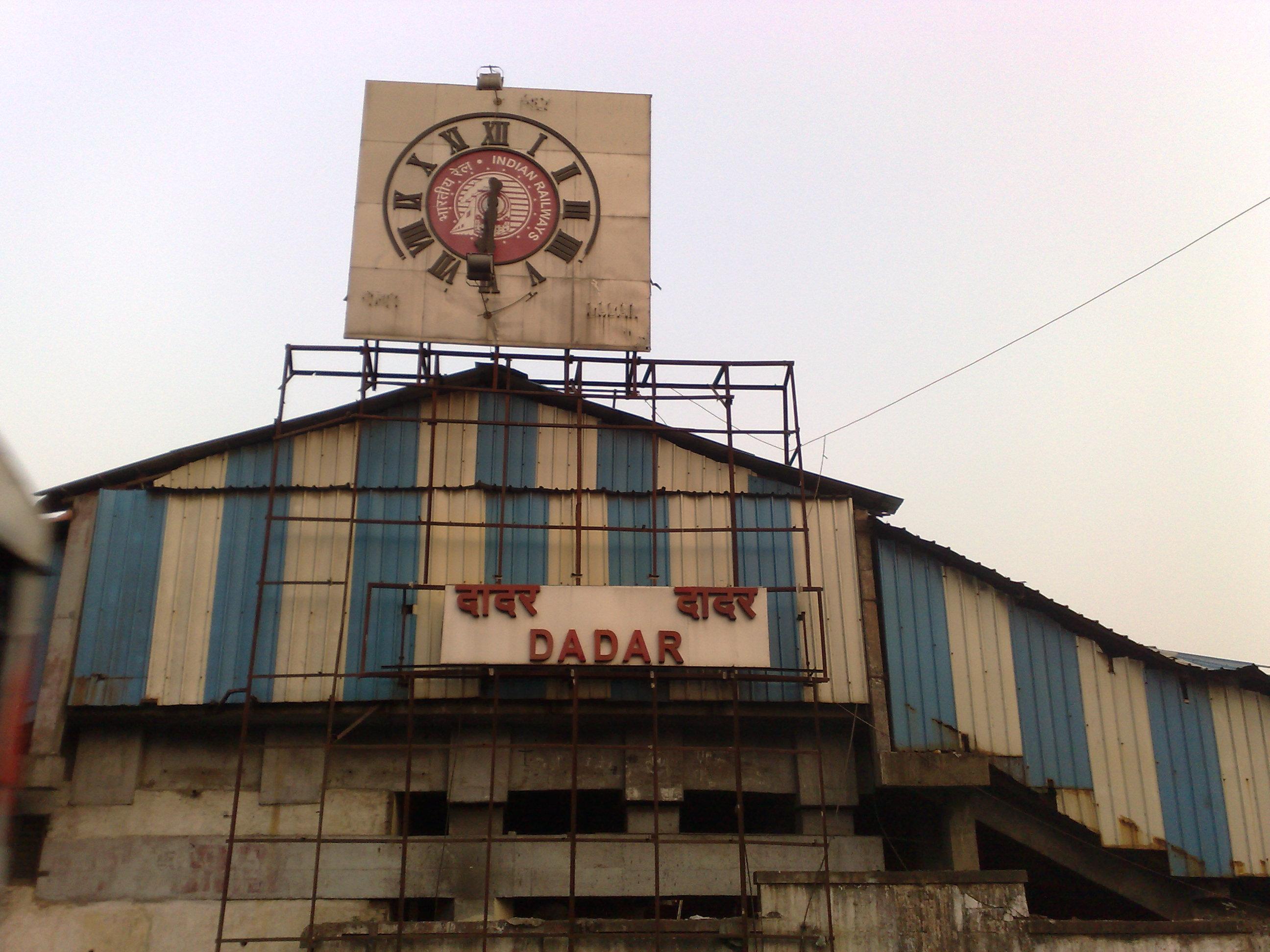
Dadar railway station entrance on the Western line side

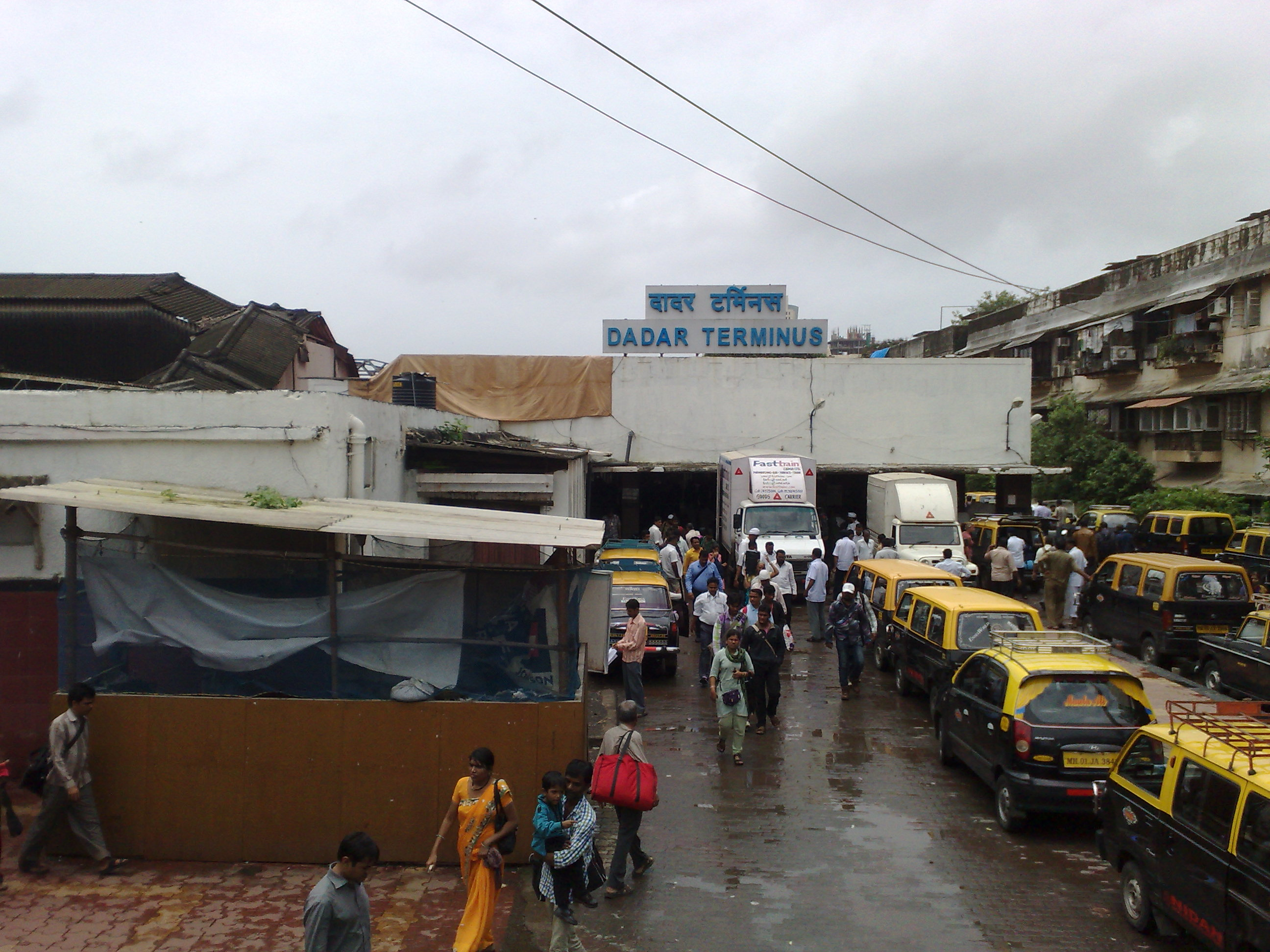
Dadar railway station entrance on the Central line side

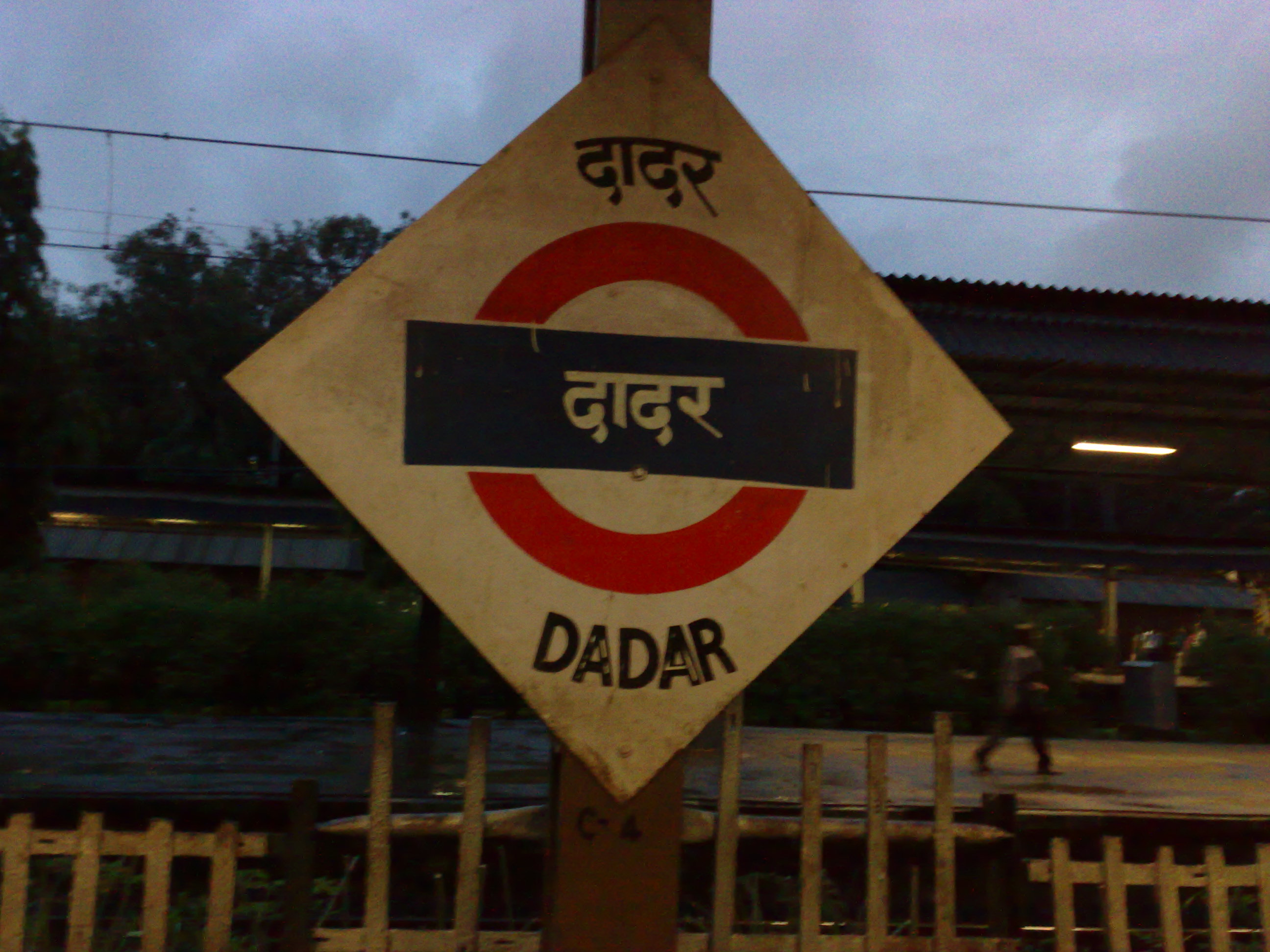
Dadar railway station platform board on Central line side
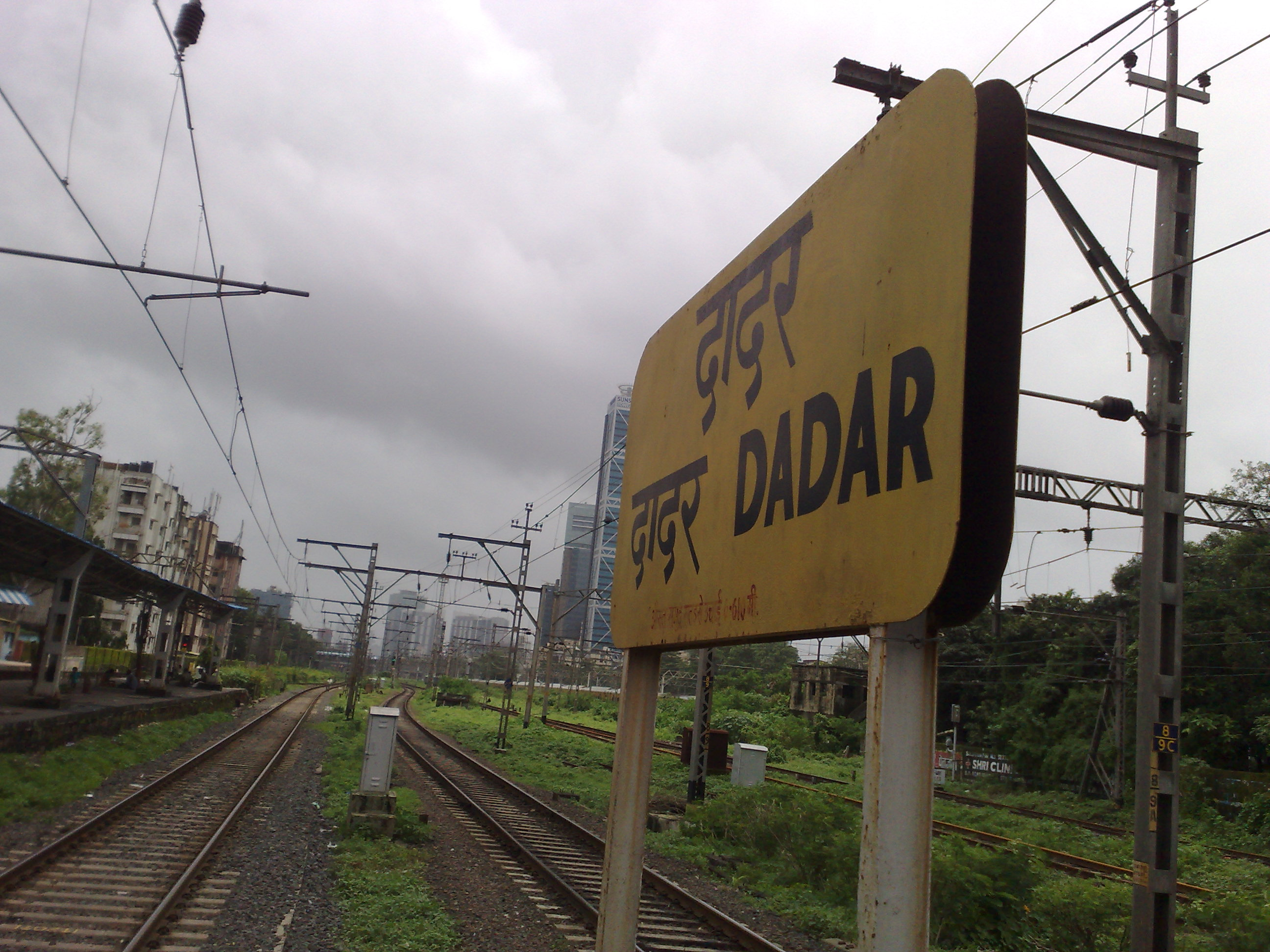
Dadar railway station board on Central line side

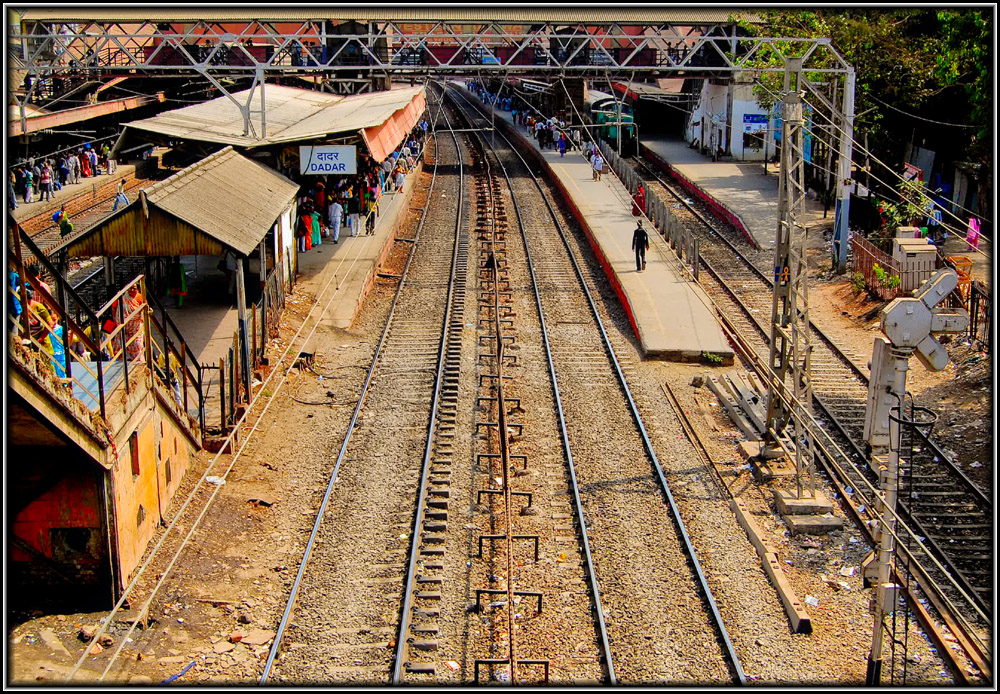
Platforms on the Western side of Dadar railway station

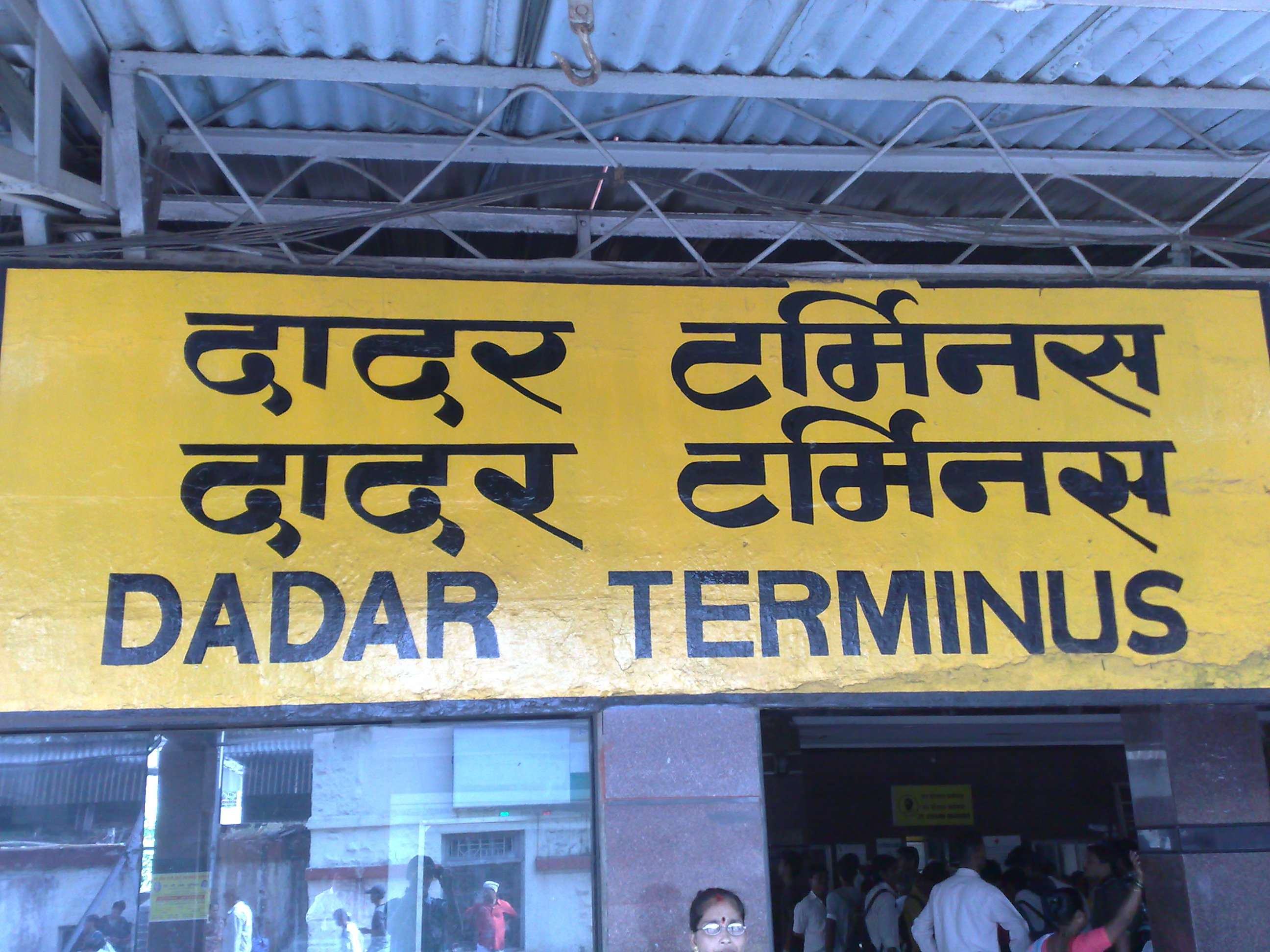
Dadar Terminus station board on Central side of Dadar railway station

There are multiple escalators available on both the sides for help in interchanging stations, which were inaugurated on 1 November 2013 on the Western line side by Western Railway And the remaining escalators were inaugurated on 21 January 2018 on the Central line side by Central Railway.

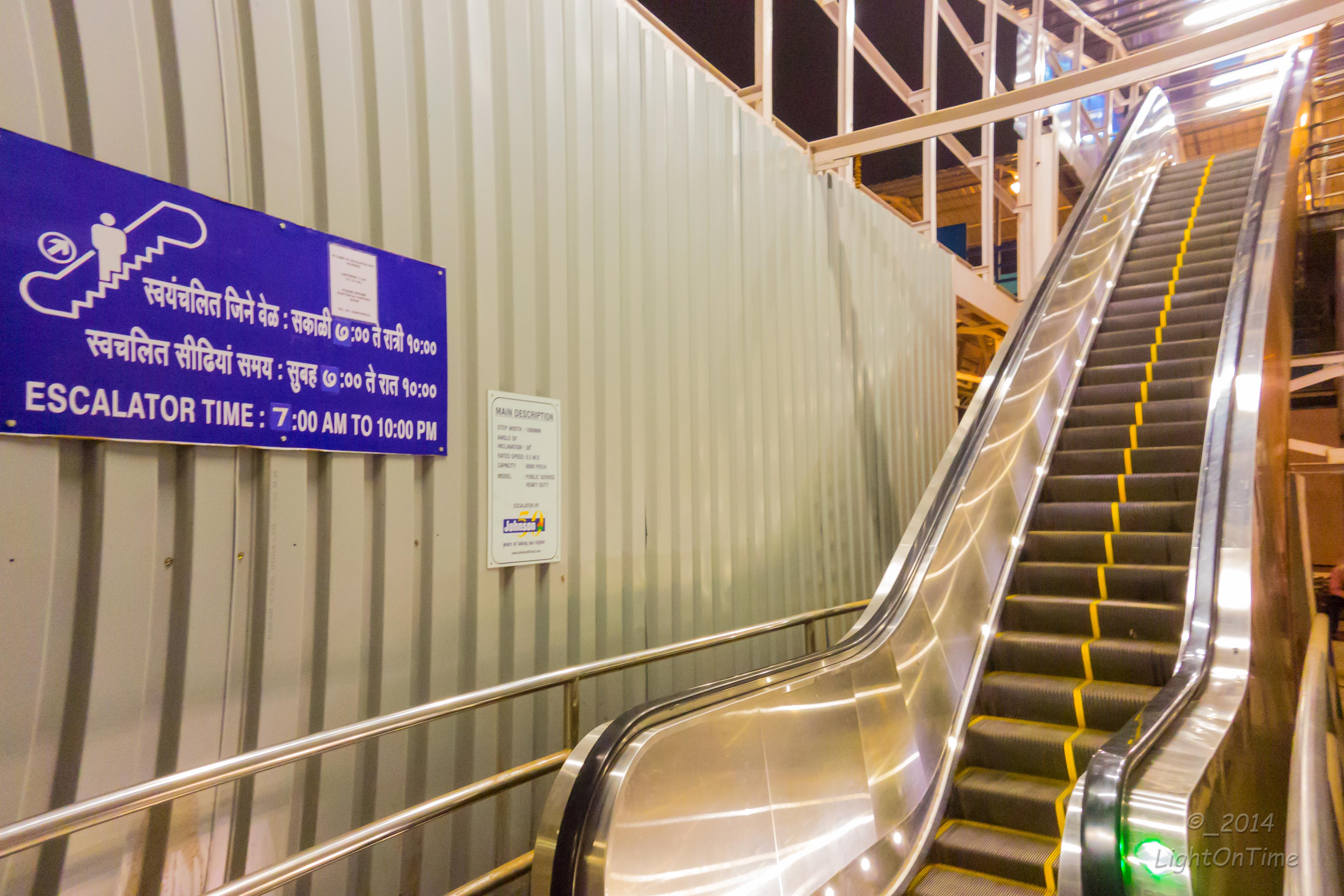
Escalator on the Western side of Dadar railway station

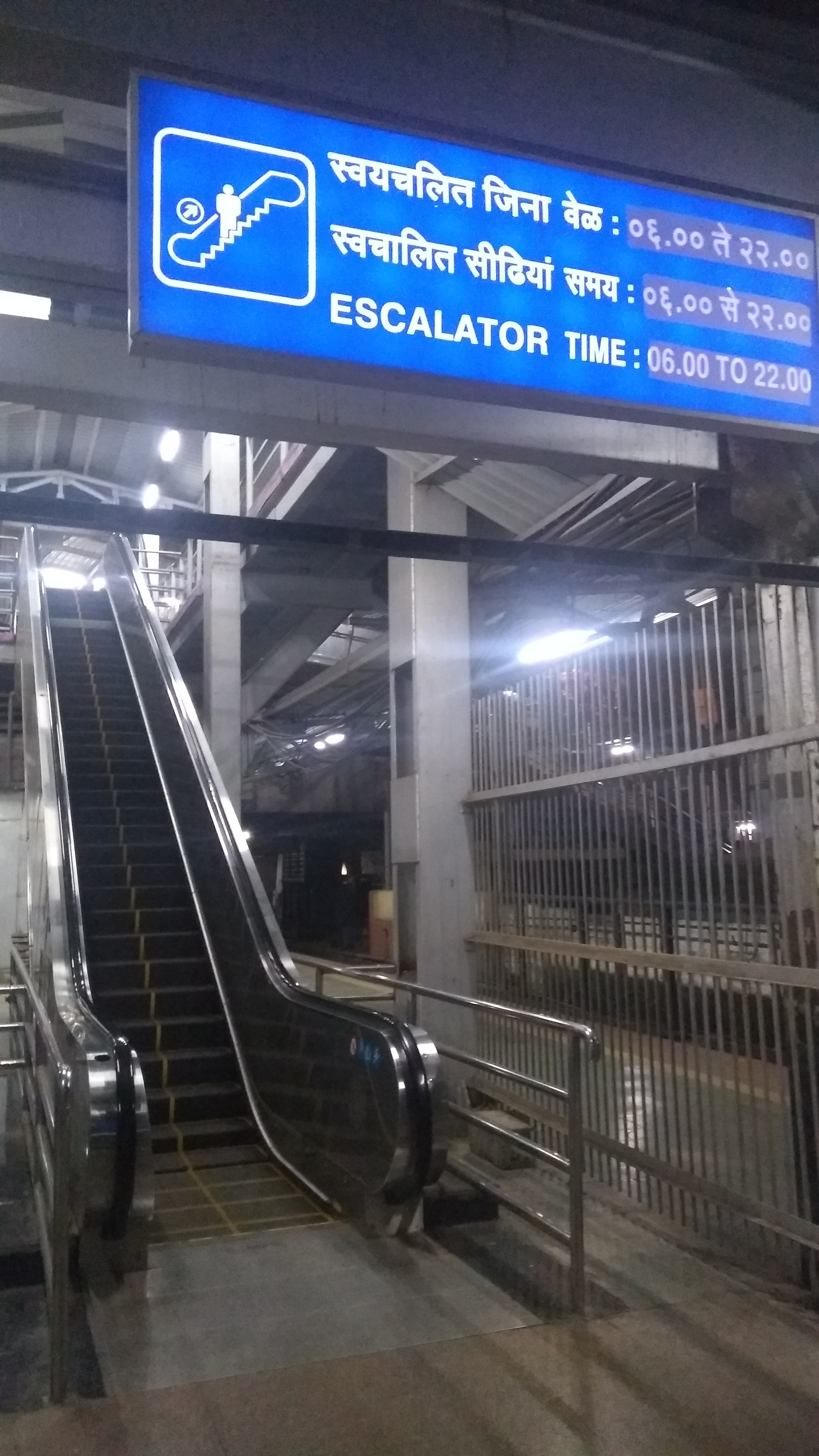
Escalator on the Central side of Dadar railway station

== Passengers ==
Dadar is the busiest railway station on the Mumbai Suburban Railway network with an average of 211,888 passengers beginning their journey from this station every day, contributing ₹1,059,440 (US$11,000) of average daily revenue.

In October 2012, CR announced plans to cease long-distance train services terminating at Dadar on the Central side within 5–6 years. The load would be transferred to Lokmanya Tilak Terminus (LTT) by upgrading the number of platforms at LTT from 5 to 12.

== Operations ==
Dadar railway station handles a total of 88 long-distance trains. In which 12 trains are on the Western line side in which 3 long-distance trains originate and terminate at Midtown Terminus and 9 long-distance trains halt at the fast suburban route of Western line.

Whereas, 76 trains are on the Central line side in which 11 long-distance trains originate and terminate at Central Terminus and 65 long-distance trains halt at the fast suburban route of Central line.

== Signalling ==
In 2026, Western Railway switched Dadar station's signalling system from conventional panel interlocking to modern electronic interlocking.

== Gallery ==
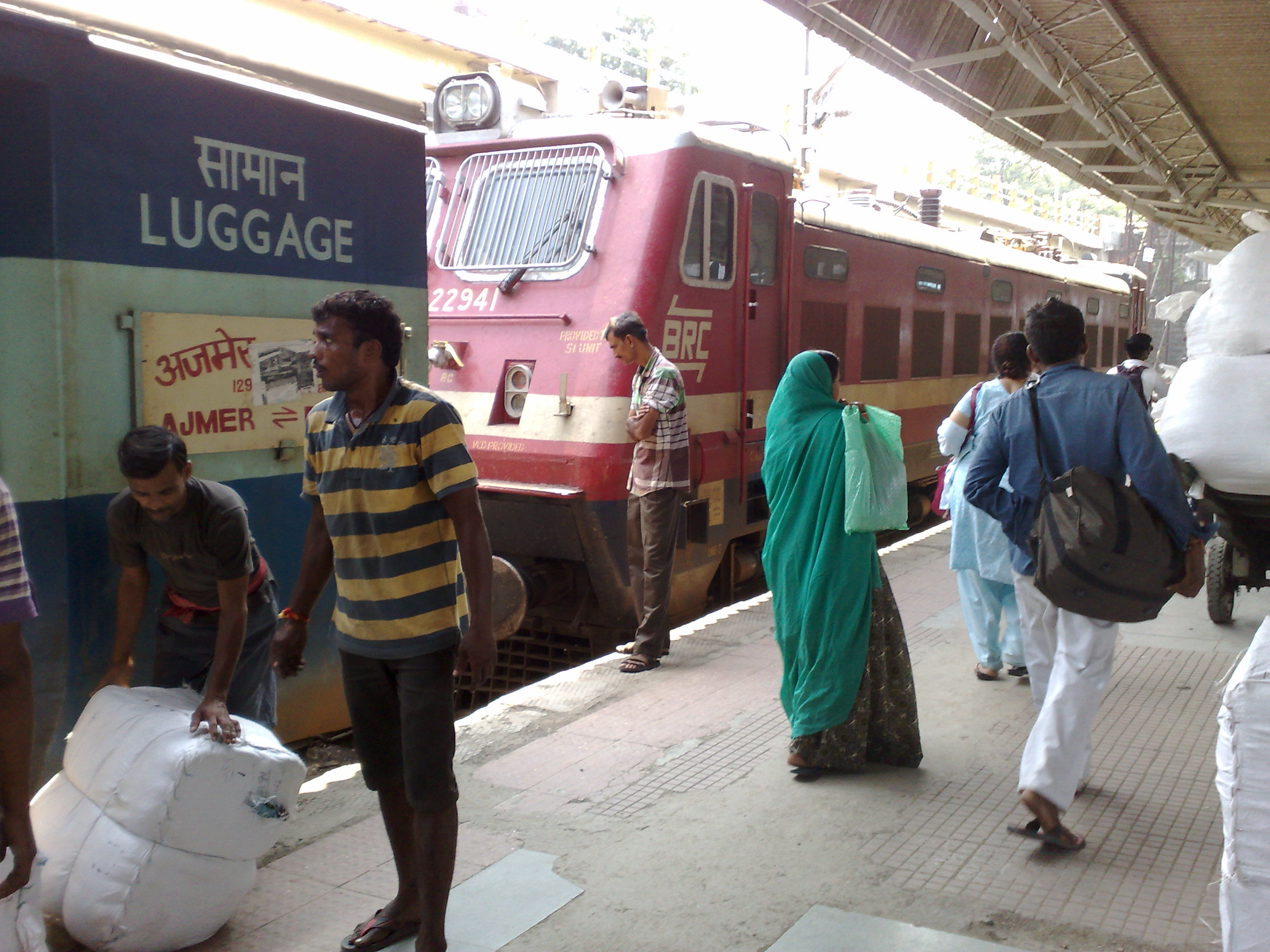
Dadar Ajmer Express at the Dadar Midtown Terminus on Western line side

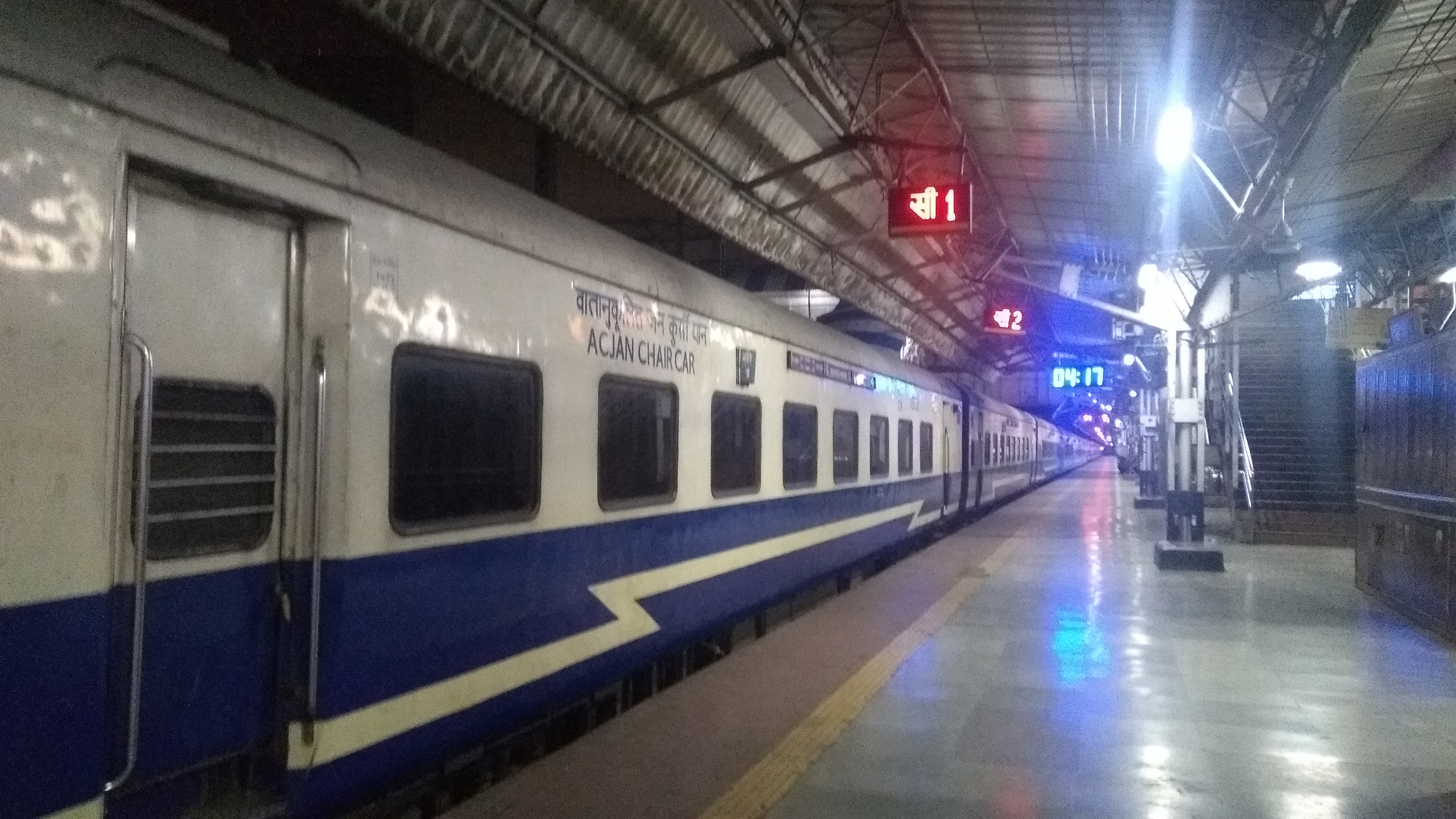
Dadar Madgaon Jan Shatabdi Express at the Dadar Terminus on Central line side
