= Rupani =

Rupani is an Indian name. It may refer to:

- Nanik Rupani (born 1941), Indian entrepreneur
- Vijay Rupani (1956–2025), Indian politician, chief minister of Gujarat
- Rupani Rural Municipality in Nepal
