= Sion railway station (India) =

Railway Station in Maharashtra, India

Sion
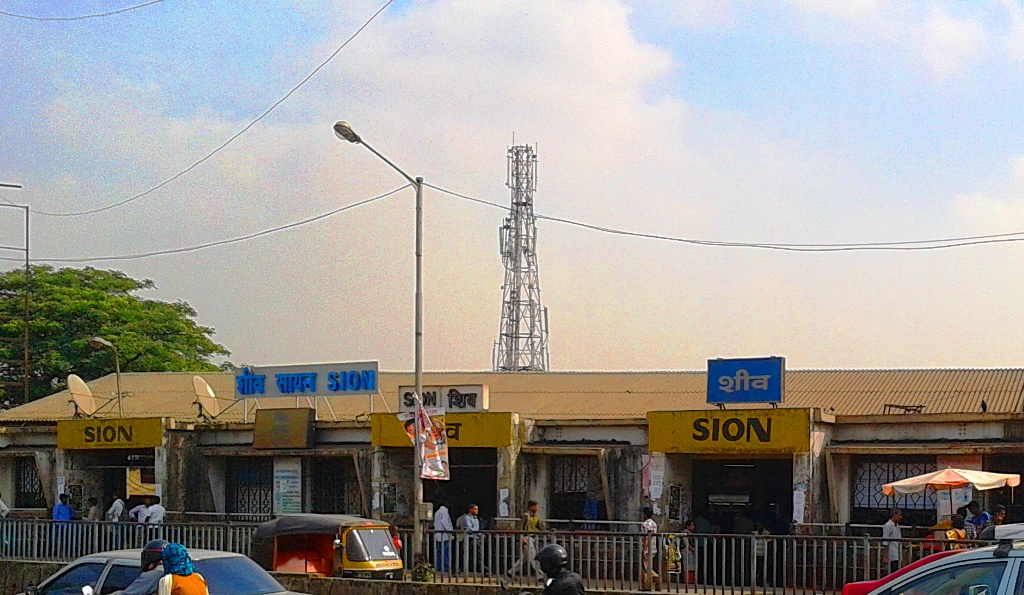

General information
- Coordinates: 19.04°N 72.86°E
- System: Indian Railways and Mumbai Suburban Railway station
- Owner: Ministry of Railways, Indian Railways
- Line: Central Line
- Platforms: 4

Construction
- Structure type: Standard on-ground station
- Platform levels: 4

Other information
- Status: Active
- Station code: SIN
- Fare zone: Central Railways

History
- Opened: 1853
- Rebuilt: 3 November 1873

Services
Preceding station	Mumbai Suburban Railway	Following station
Matunga towards Chhatrapati Shivaji Terminus	Central line	Kurla towards Kasara or Khopoli
Route map
Location
- Location within Mumbai

Sion (station code: SIN) is a railway station on the Central line of the Mumbai Suburban Railway network, located in the Mumbai neighborhood of Sion.

Its location near the Mithi River means that the railway between Sion and Kurla, directly to the north, has flooded frequently during the Indian monsoon. However, in 2019, the Central Railway conducted work to raise the trackbed by four to six inches to prevent future flooding. Previously, 30 mm of rain in 24 hours flooded the track, but now there will be no disruption of services with 100 mm of rain per day.

Despite this work, the tracks near this station still experienced water-logging and flooding during the 2019 floods in Mumbai.

== History ==
Sion can be considered the actual place of inauguration of the GIP Railway, since it was here that the "first sod for the railway was turned" by the Chief Secretary of the then Bombay Government, John P. Willoughby. Sion was one of the stations for the First Passenger Train of India (the second stop), that ran on 16 April 1853, where its engines were 'watered' and its wheels greased.

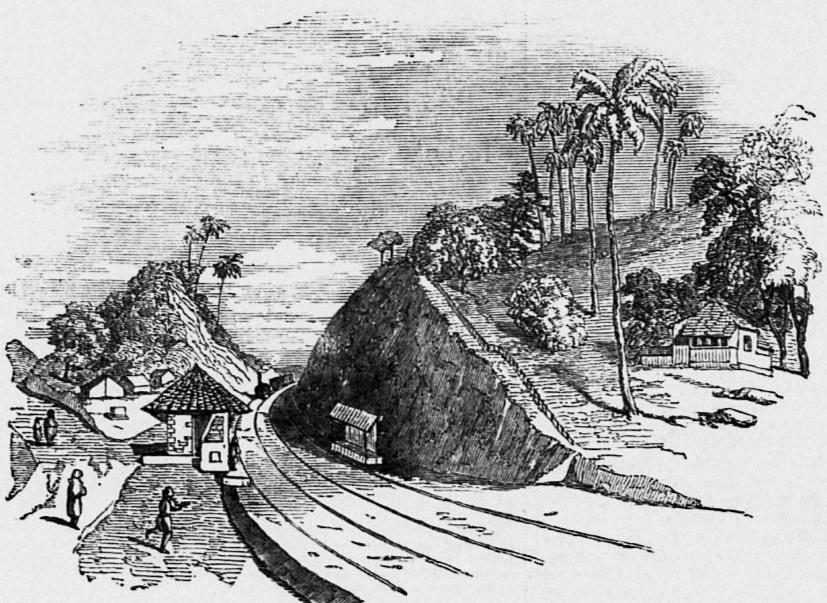
The site of the former Sion station, later renamed Kurla

The original Sion station was not situated at its present site, but was somewhere close to Kurla. While the name of the station was initially Sion, in 1855, it was therefore renamed to Kurla. (in 1895, this station was shifted to its present site, and is still called the Kurla Station) There was no railway station between this old station and Dadar, which proved to be of great inconvenience to the passengers. Therefore, in 1872, 107 local inhabitants from Sion and nearby villages sent a petition to the Railway Company (GIPR) to request a station be built. Considering the petitions and the benefits it offered, the GIPR eventually built an official station, the Sion Station. This new station was opened on 3 November 1873.

== Gallery ==
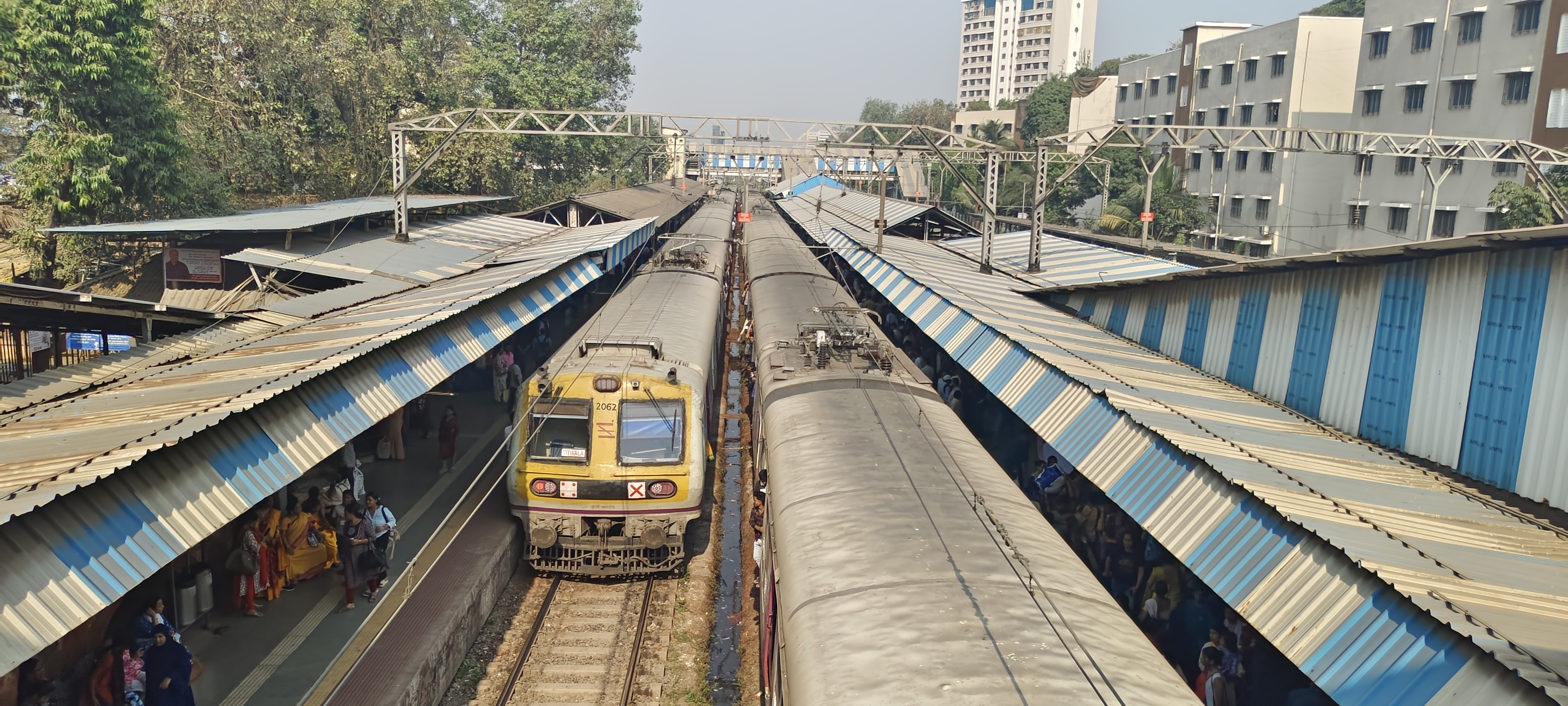
Sion station, view from FoB: Platforms 1, 2

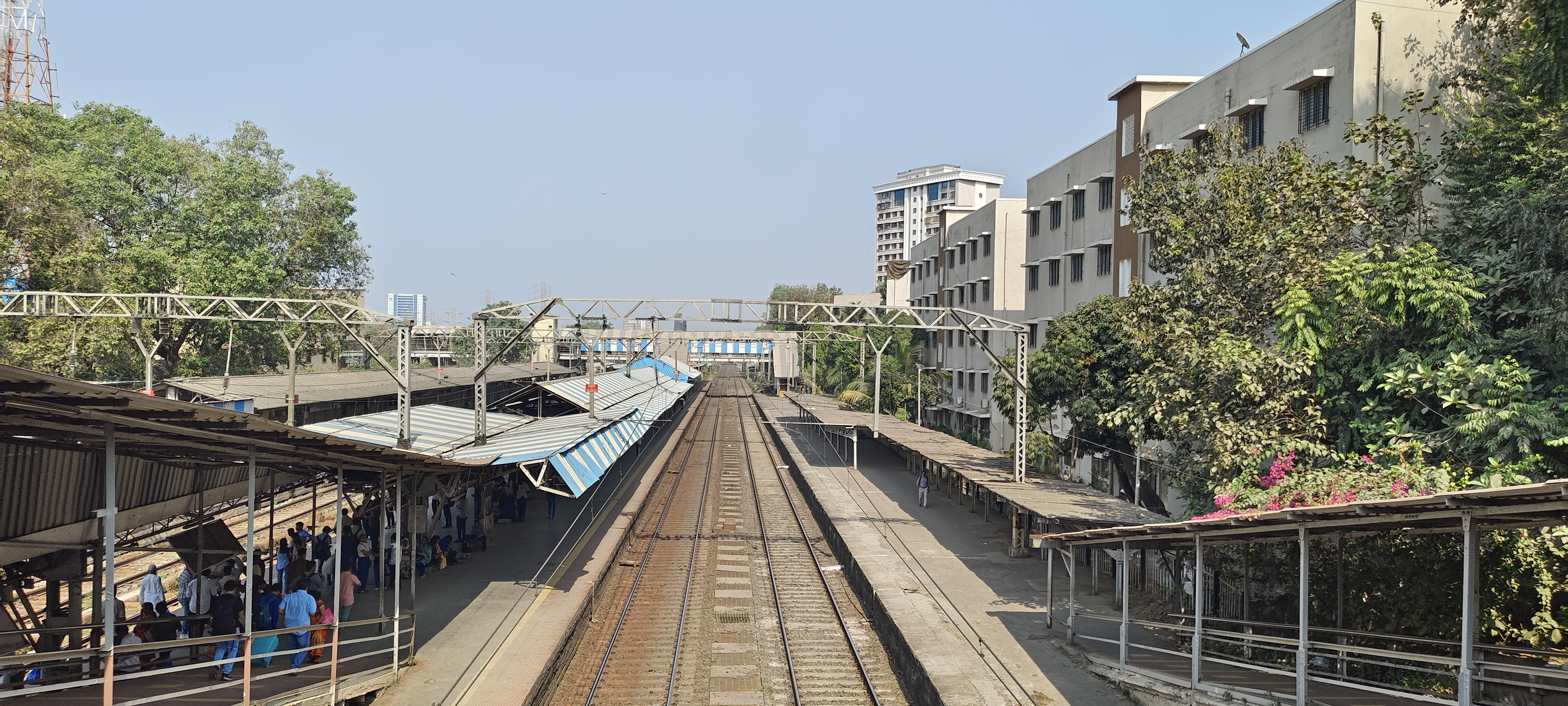
Anothet, view from FoB: Platforms 3, 4

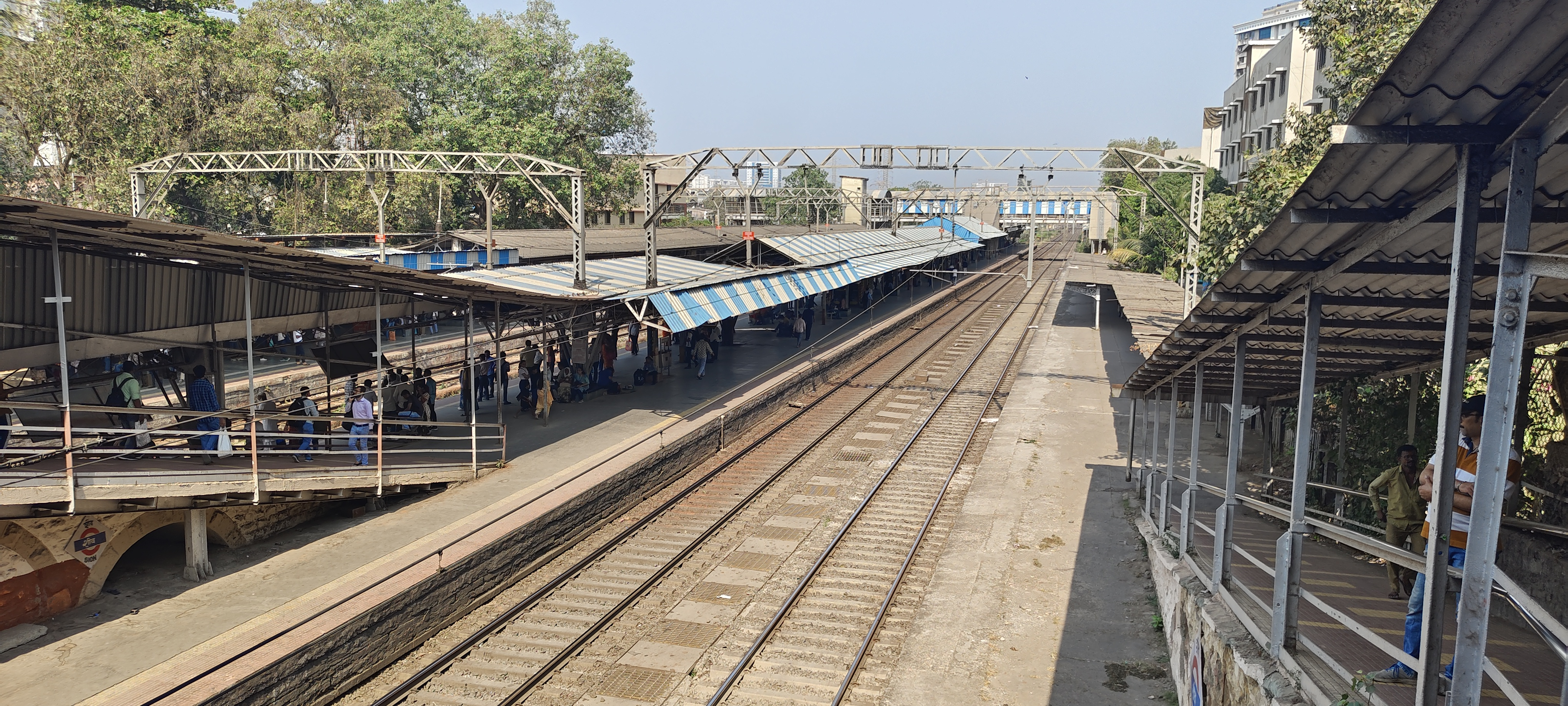
Sion station, view from FoB: Platforms 3, 4

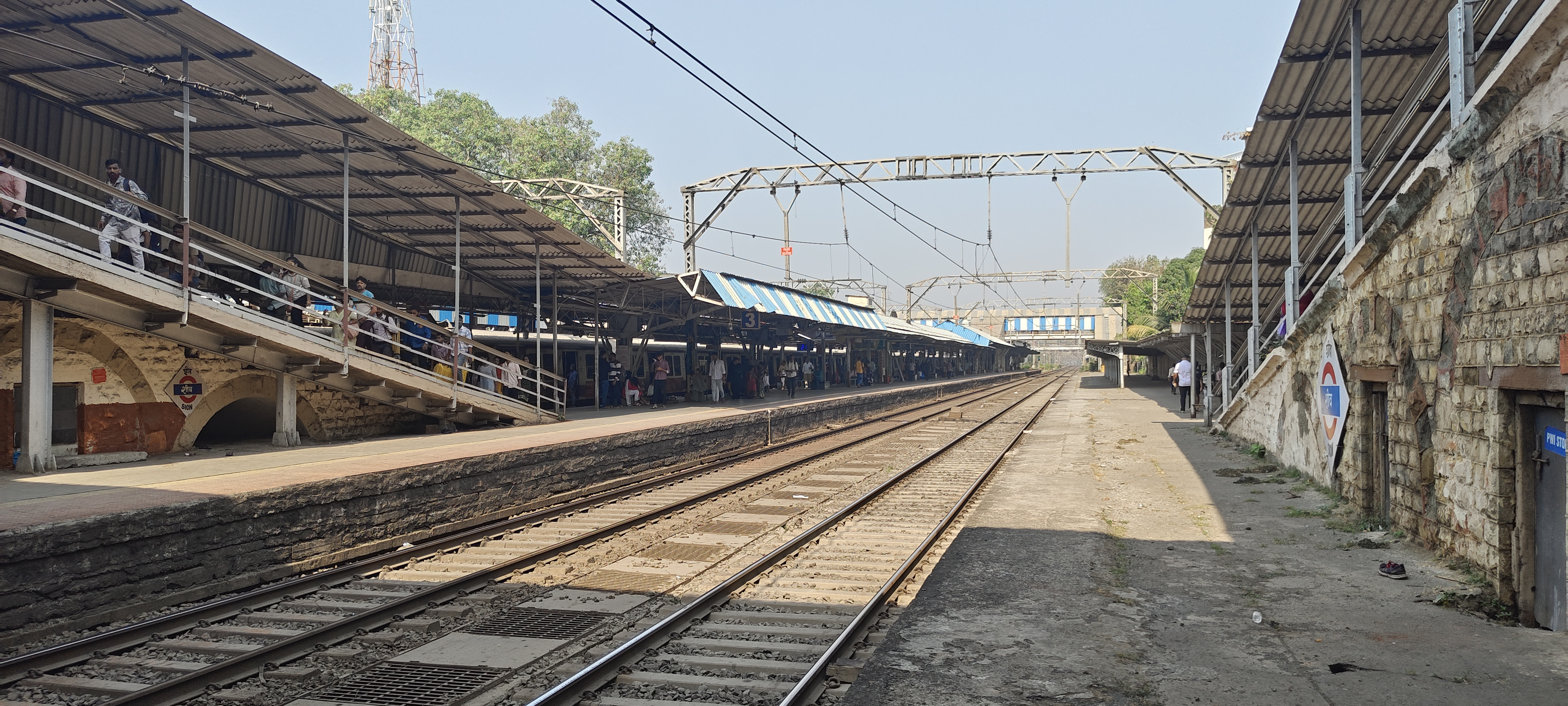
View of Sion station platform 4

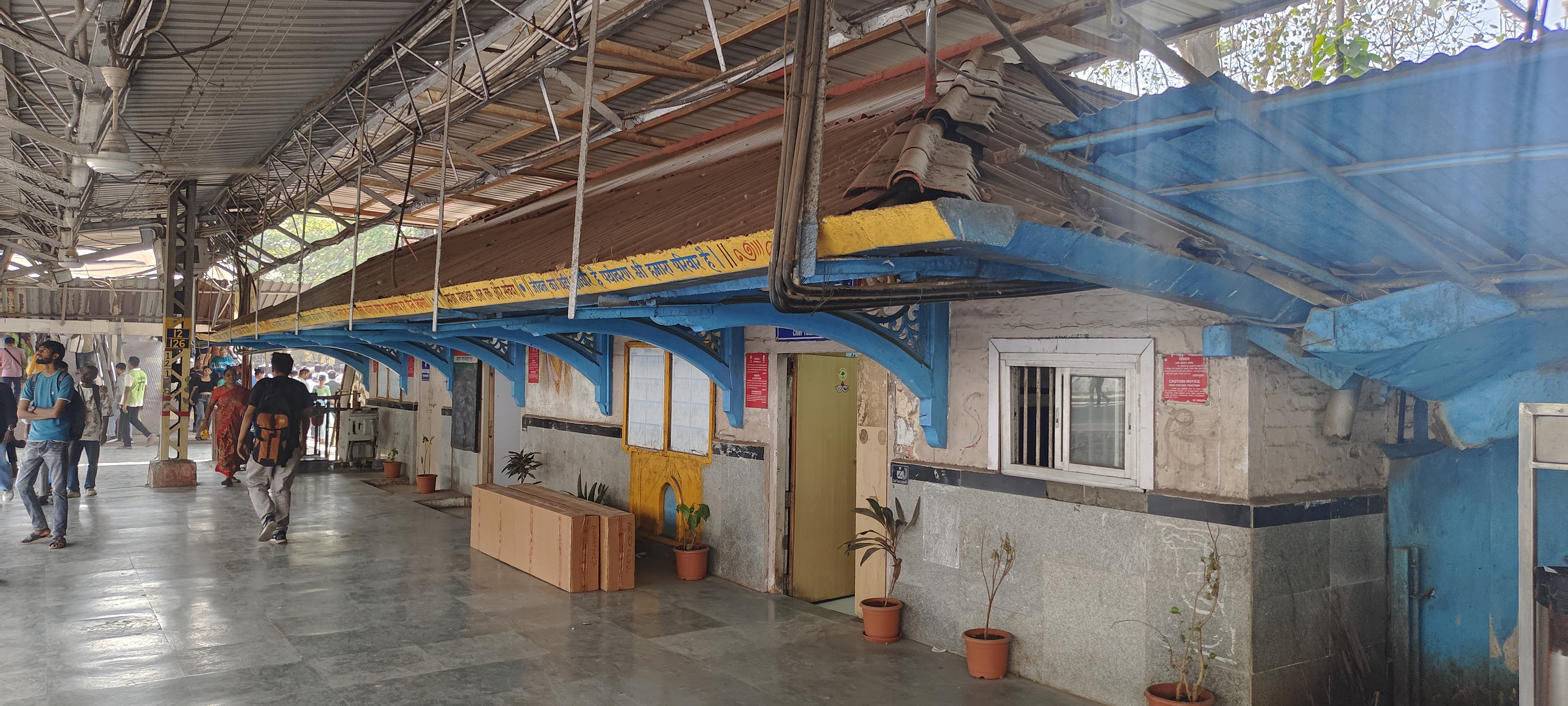
Sion station, Platform building

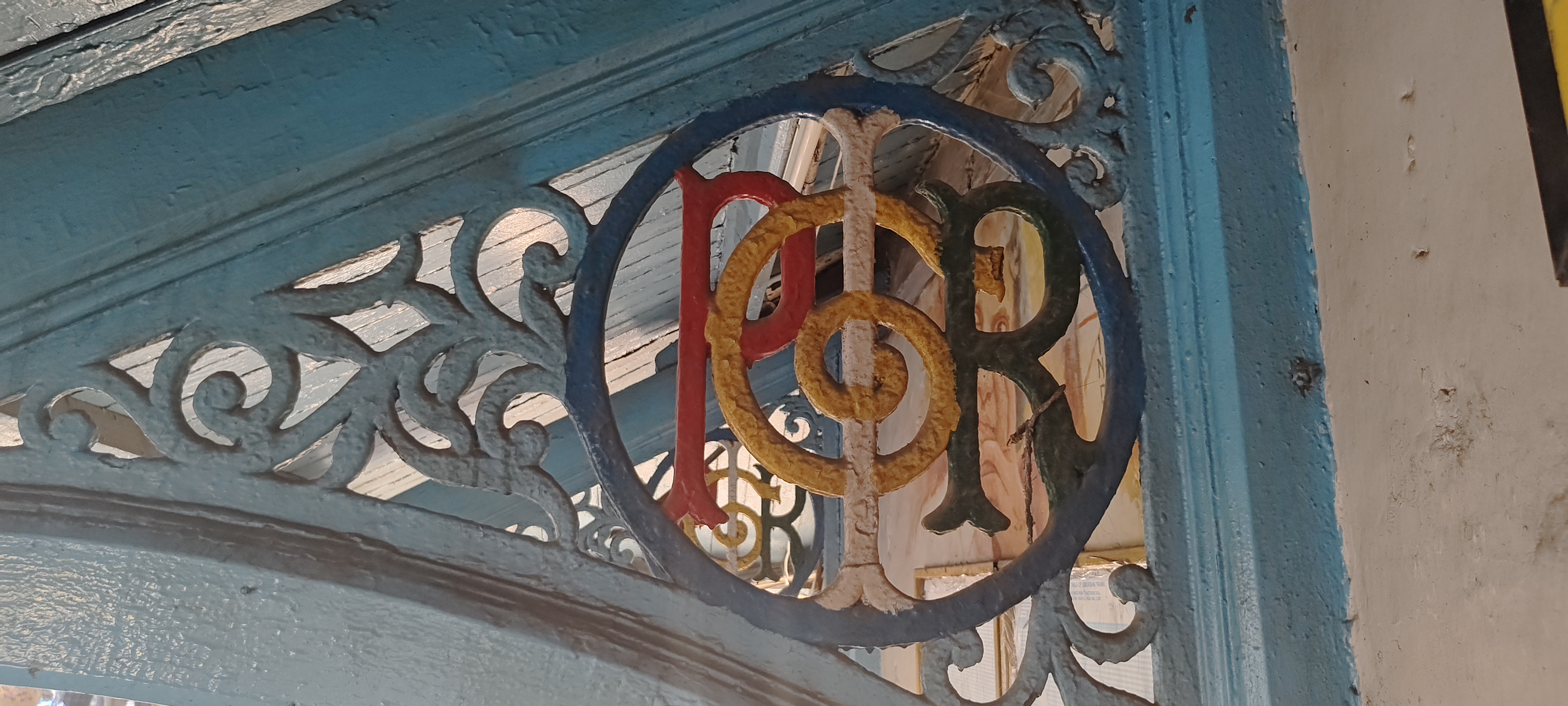
GIPR emblem on station building

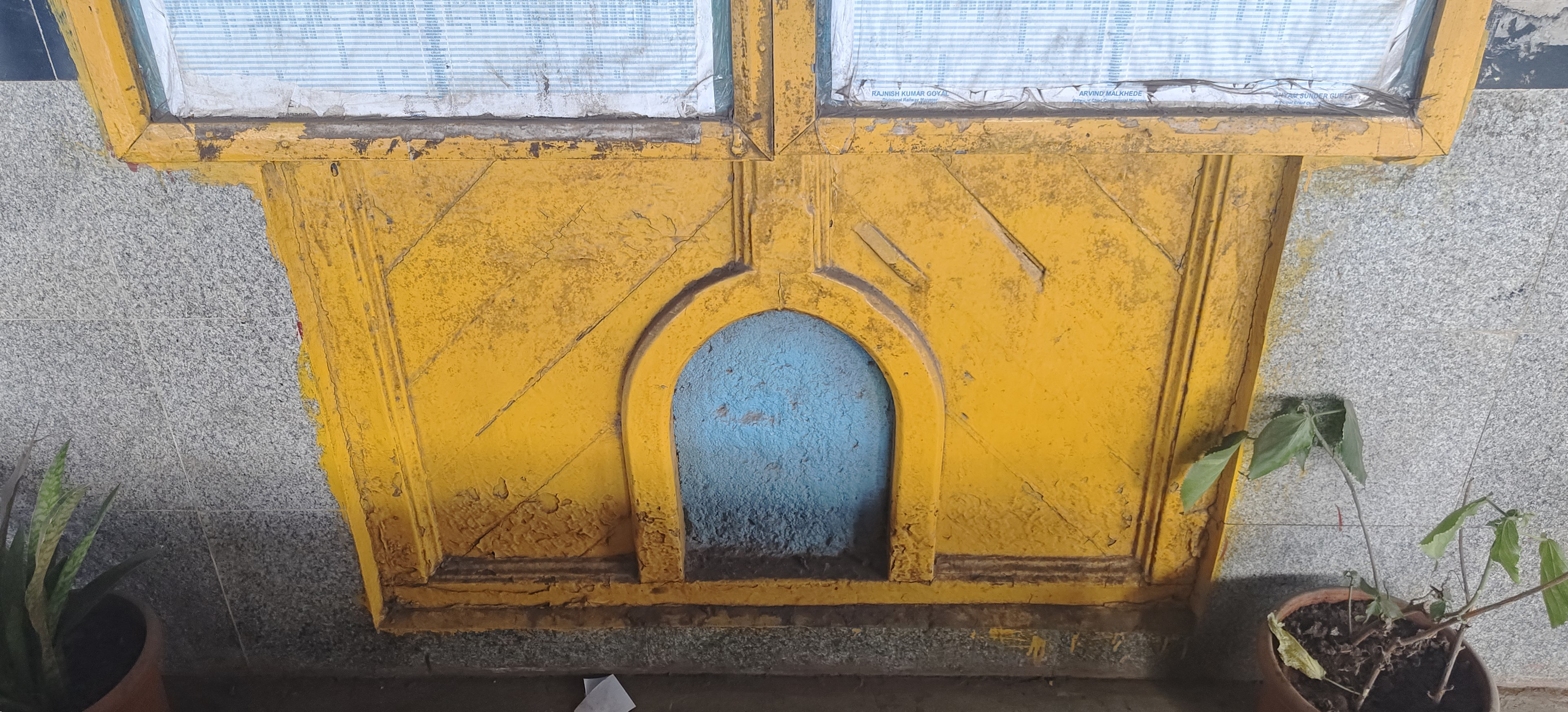
Old window on the building

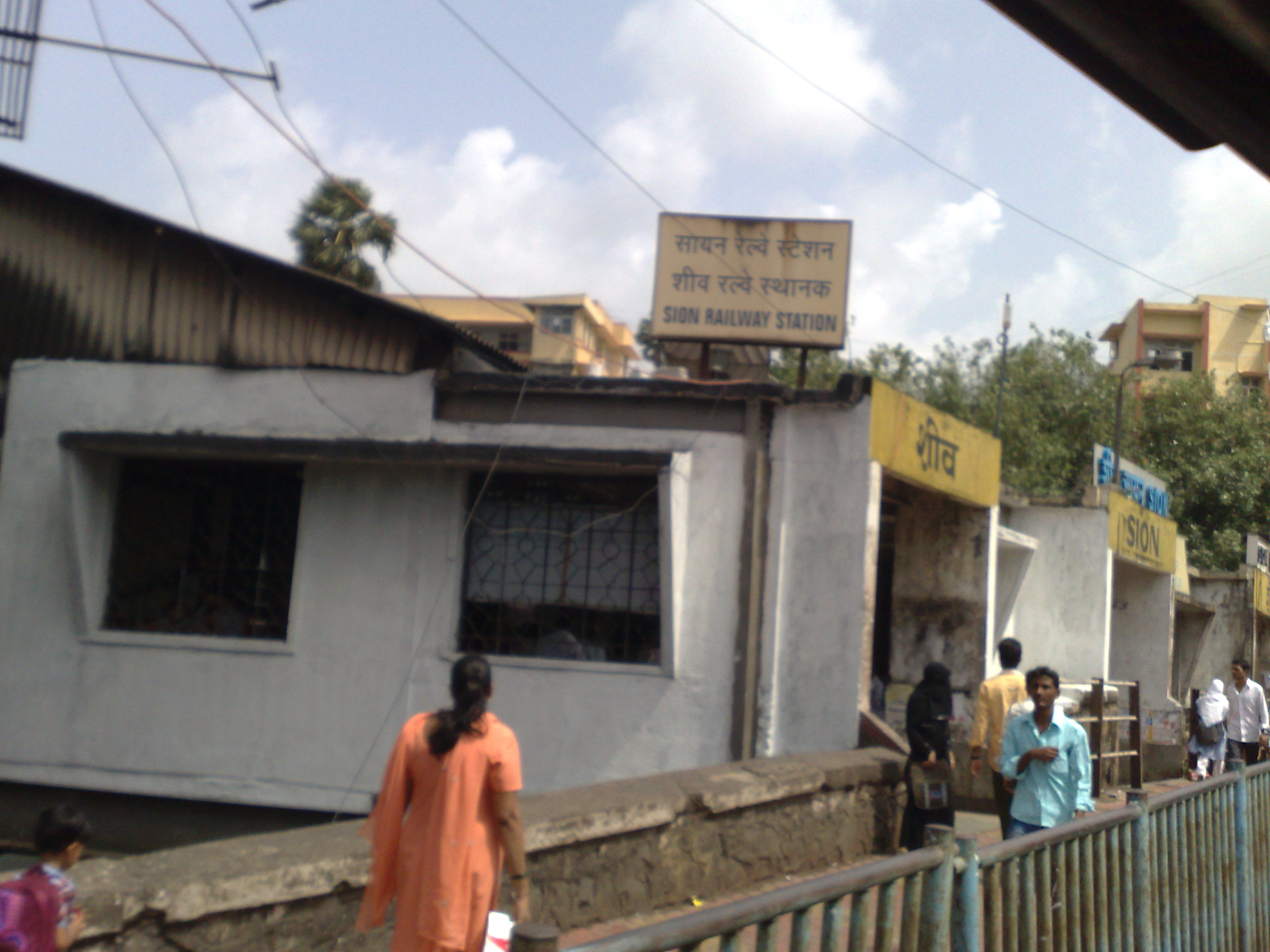
Outside Sion Station

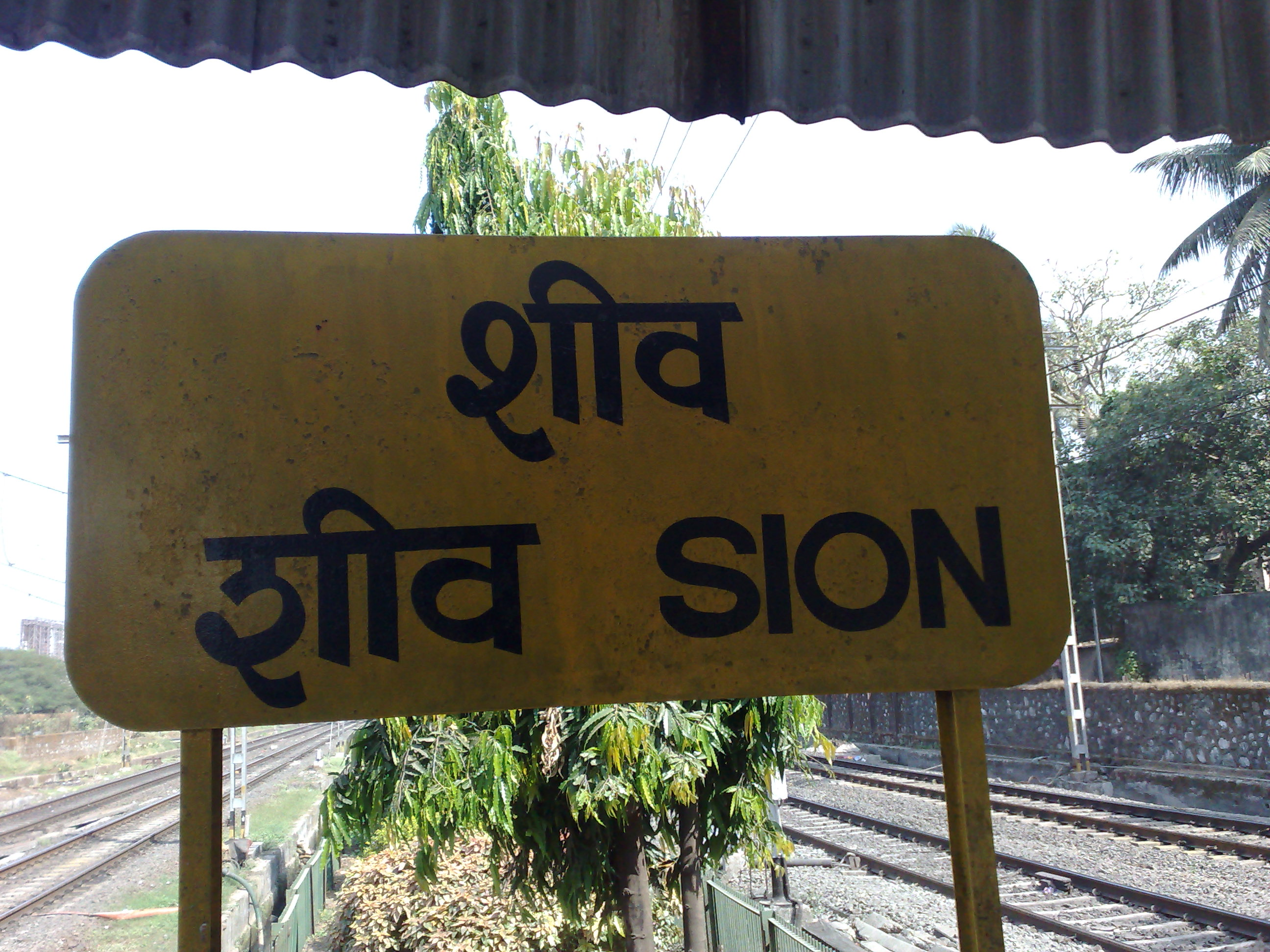
Sion Station Board
