= Matunga Road railway station =

Station of the Mumbai Suburban Railway

Matunga Road

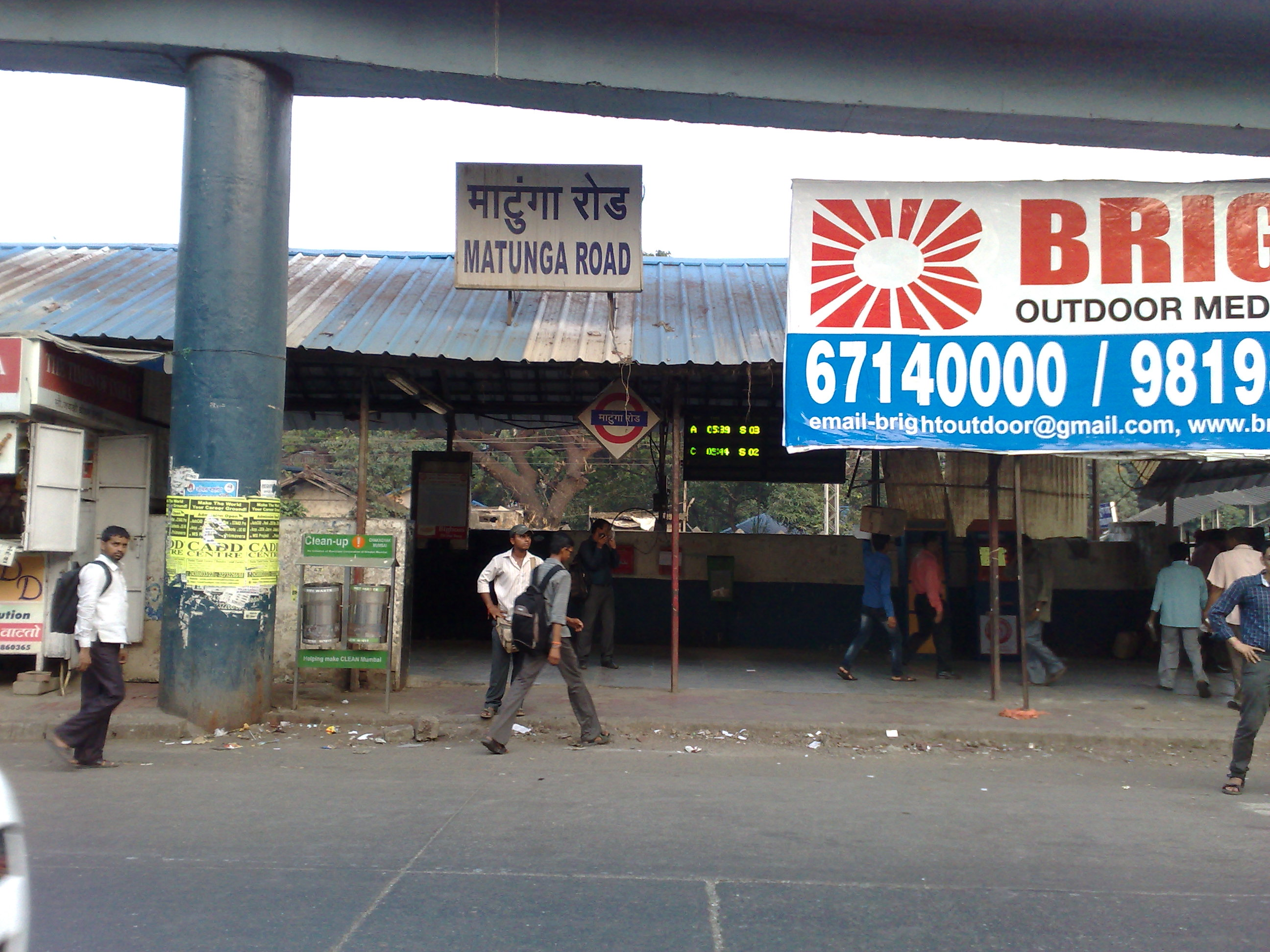

General information
- Coordinates: 19°1′41″N 72°50′49″E
- System: Mumbai Suburban Railway station
- Owner: Ministry of Railways, Indian Railways
- Line: Western Line
- Platforms: 2
- Tracks: 5

Construction
- Structure type: Standard on-ground station

Other information
- Status: Active
- Station code: MRU
- Fare zone: Western Railways

History
- Opened: 1900

Services
Preceding station	Mumbai Suburban Railway	Following station
Dadar towards Churchgate	Western line	Mahim Junction towards Dahanu Road
Route map
Location
- Location within Mumbai

Matunga Road railway station ([maːʈuŋɡaː] station code:MRU) is on the Western Line of the Mumbai Suburban Railway network in Maharashtra. It offers access to Matunga and Shivaji Park areas of Mumbai. It should not be confused with the nearby Matunga railway station, which is on the Central Line just to the east. Matunga Road is one of the smallest railway halt in Mumbai in terms of number of passengers and number of platforms. The Ruparel College is the nearest college to this station. Fast local trains between Churchgate and Virar do not stop at Matunga Road station. It has been documented as the first suburban station on Western Railway to be run by all-women staff.

== Events ==
Western Railway on International Women's Day 2018, stepped in to make one of its railway station Matunga Road to be run by all women staff. Western Railway posted a total of 31 women staffers as frontline staff, comprising Commercial, Operating and Security departments. It includes 13 Commercial clerks and 3 Ticket checking staff to undertake commercial activities, whereas 11 Operating staff (Station Master and Points person) and 4 Railway Protection Force personnel. These handle overall operations of Matunga Road station round the clock as of 2018. In addition to this, Western Railway also collaborated with Rotary Club of Bombay Queen for beautification of Matunga Road station in 2018. The theme-based painting work depicting the diversified role and emergence of women in the Society has been planned across the Booking offices, Station Superintendent office and Foot over Bridges. With this, Matunga Road became the first such station on the Western Railway and the second suburban railway station in Mumbai to be operated only by women.

== Incidents ==
At 1.40pm on 29 October 1993 a "crude bomb with lots of nails" exploded under the seat of a second-class compartment in a train at Matunga Road station. 2 people died and 40 were injured.

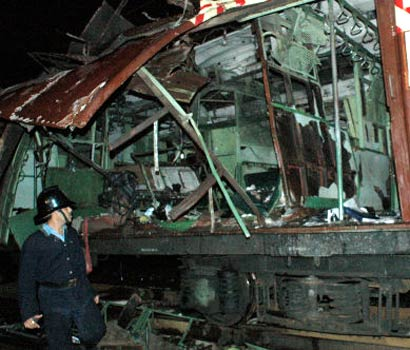
11 July 2006 Mumbai train bombings in Matunga railway station

Matunga Road was one of the stations affected by 11 July 2006 Mumbai train bombings. Just before 18.15, a bomb exploded in the first-class general compartment of the 17.57 Churchgate-Virar fast train as the train was passing Matunga Road station on the fast line. There was no damage to the station. A memorial plaque stands at the north end of the station today.

== Gallery ==
Matunga road station, c. 1923

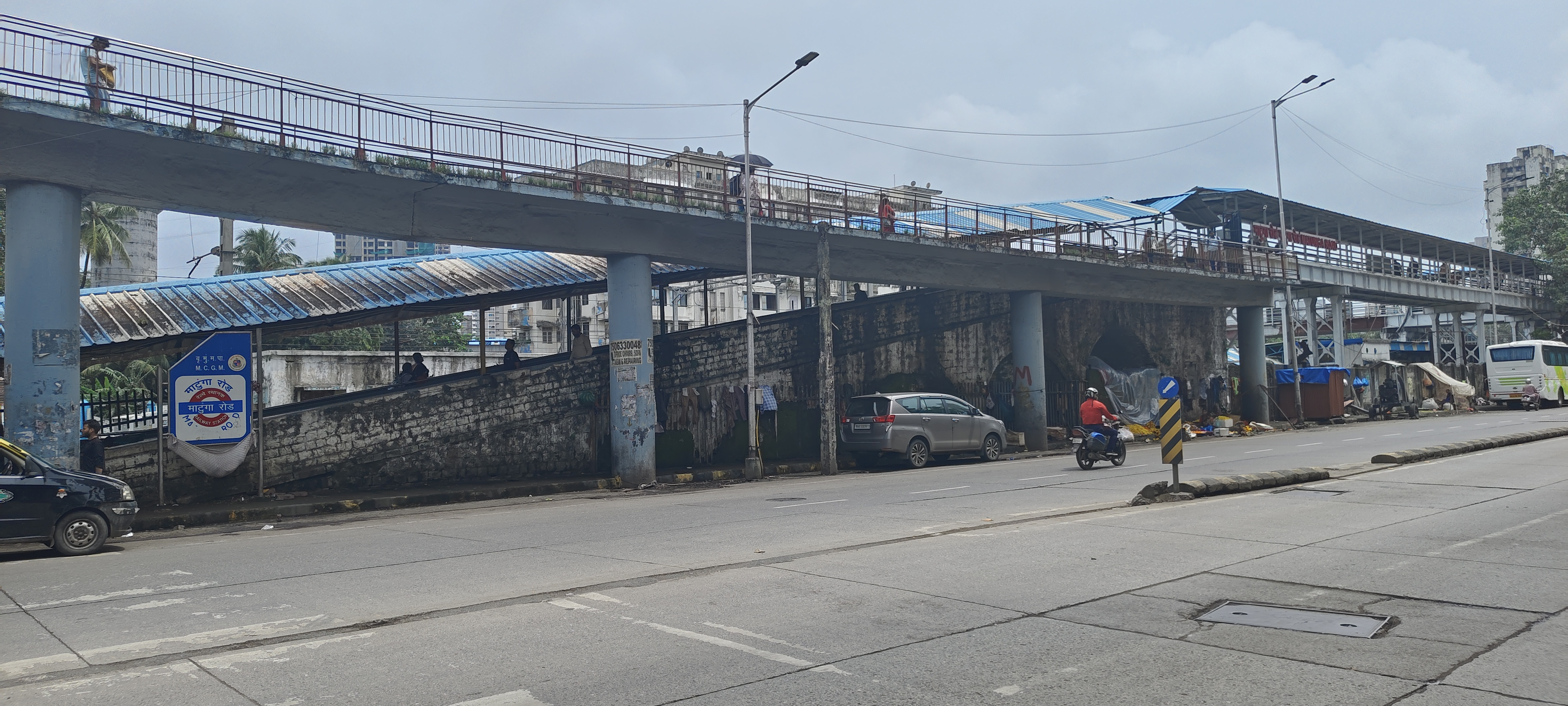
British Era Footover bridge ramp at Matunga Rd

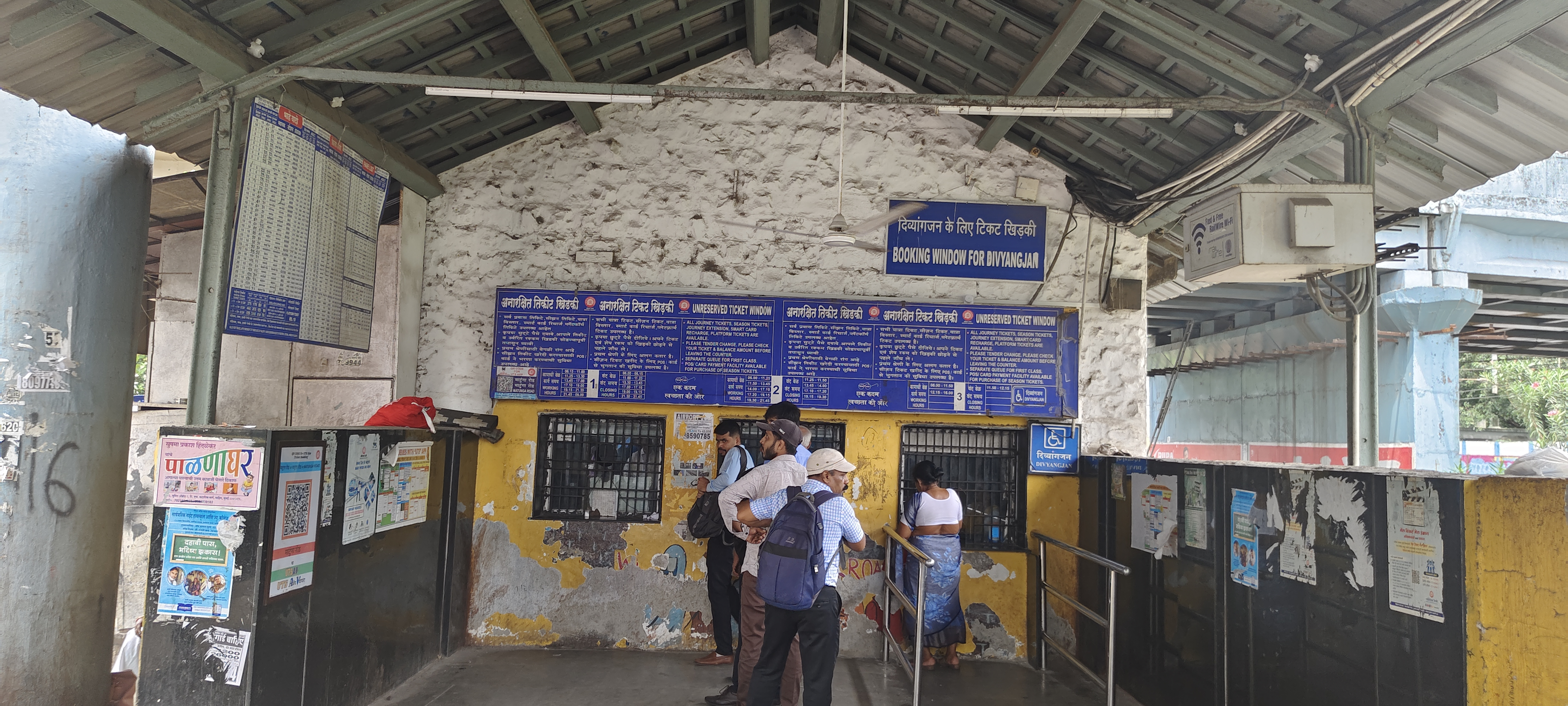
The Stone Booking Office of Matunga Rd

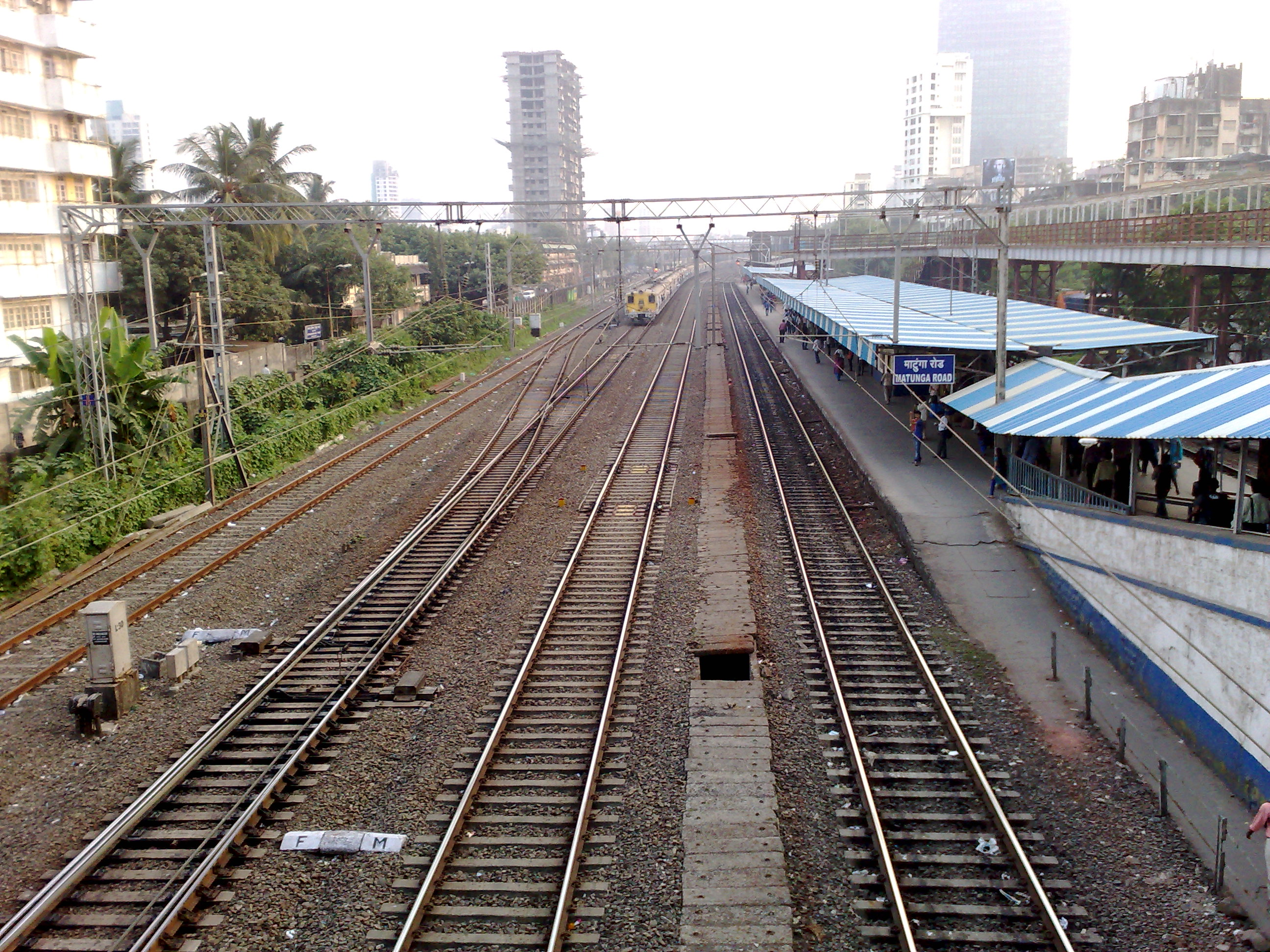
Matunga Road railway station - Overview showing Lines 2,3,4 & 5

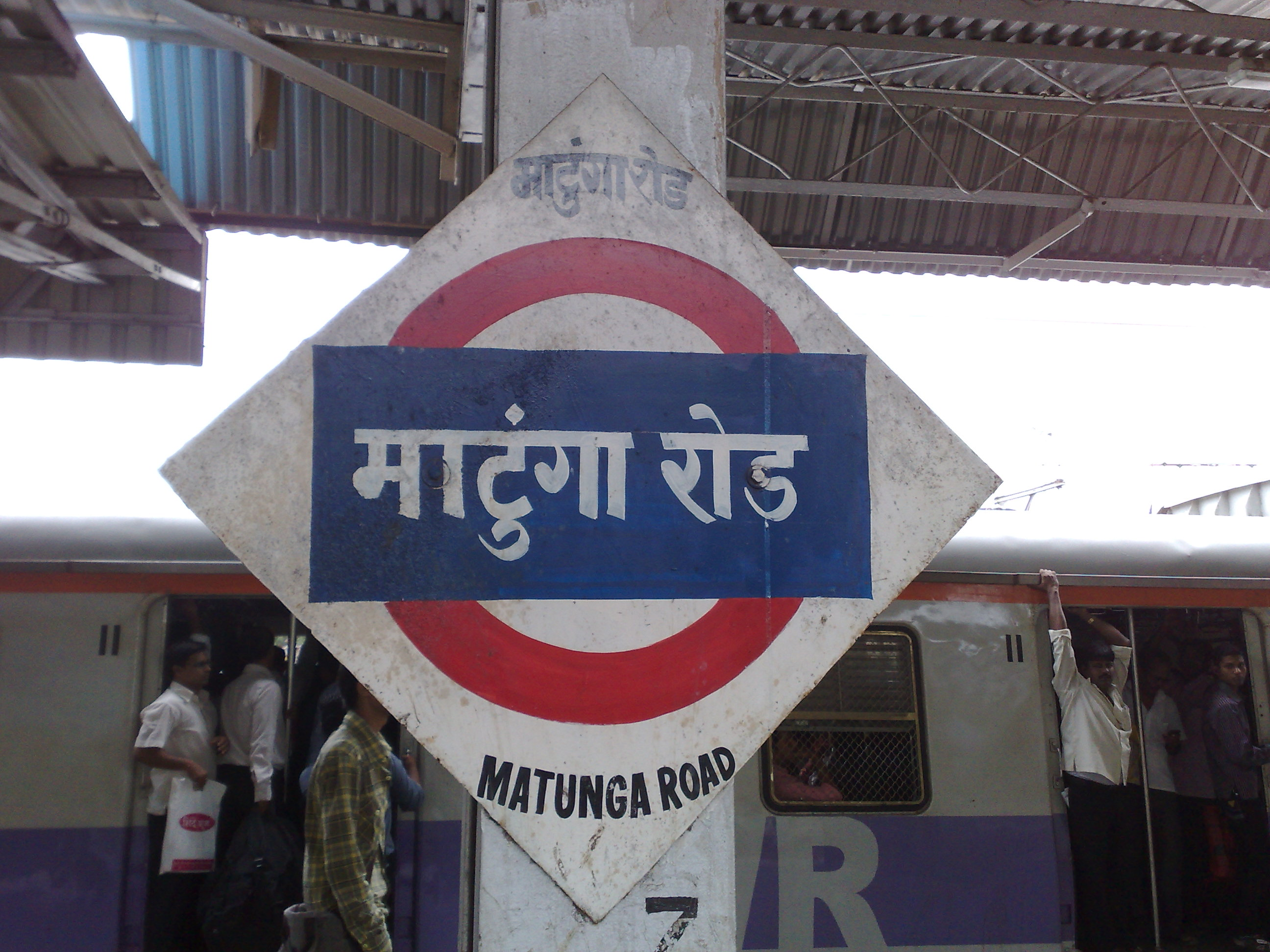
Matunga Road Platform Board
