= Matunga railway station =

Railway Station in Maharashtra, India

Matunga
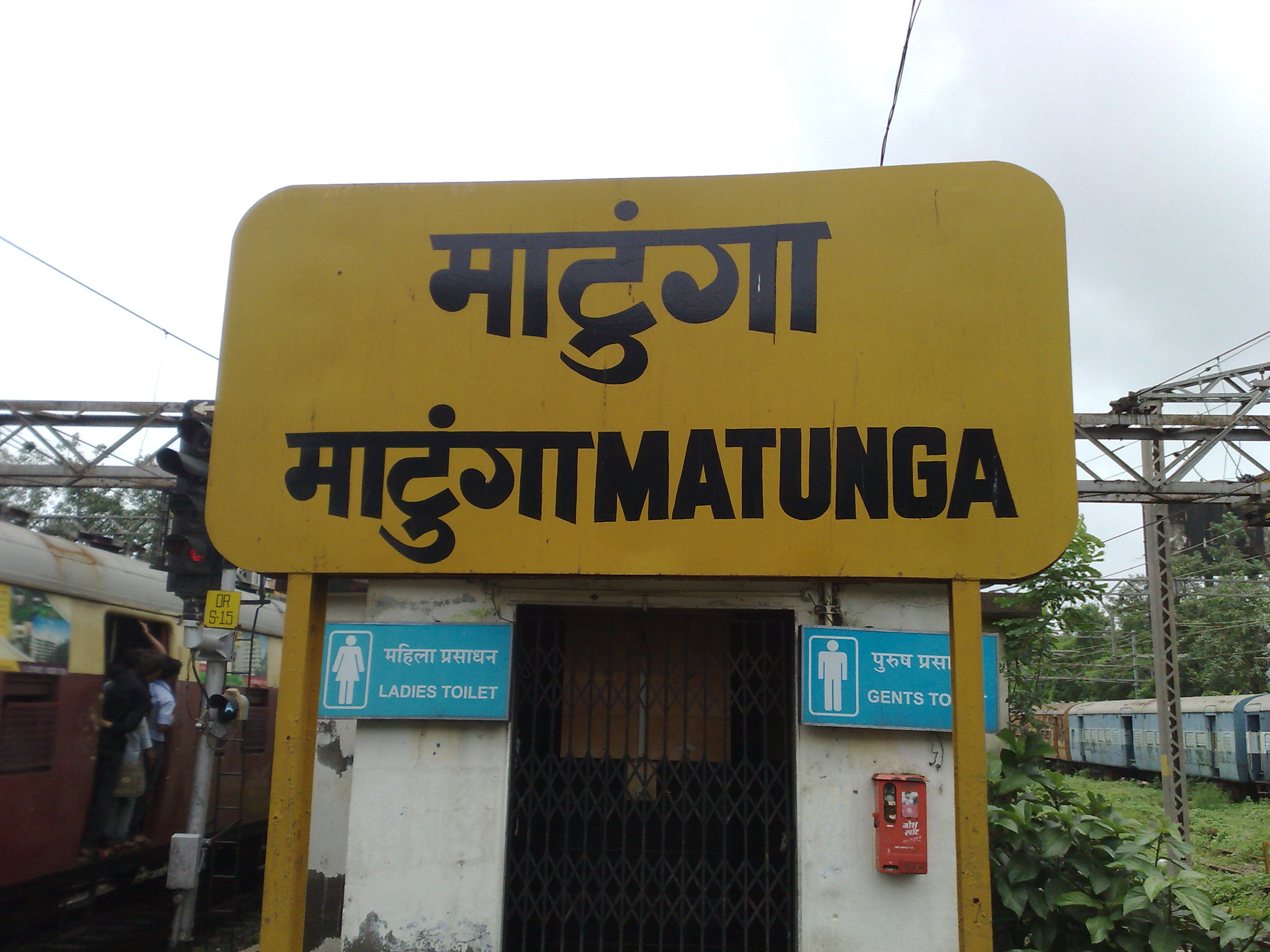

General information
- Coordinates: 19.027414°N 72.850163°E
- System: Indian Railways and Mumbai Suburban Railway station
- Owner: Ministry of Railways, Indian Railways
- Line: Central Line

Construction
- Structure type: Standard on-ground station

Other information
- Status: Active
- Station code: MTN
- Fare zone: Central Railways

History
- Opened: 1 October 1883

Services
Preceding station	Mumbai Suburban Railway	Following station
Dadar towards Chhatrapati Shivaji Terminus	Central line	Sion towards Kasara or Khopoli
Route map
Location
- Location within Mumbai

Matunga (station code: MTN) is a railway station on the Central line of the Mumbai Suburban Railway network. It should not be confused with the nearby Matunga Road railway station on the Western Line. As per the Limca Book of Records 2018, Matunga is the first railway station in India in suburban category to be completely staffed by women.

== Events ==
Mumbai Division of Central Railway in July 2017 posted a total of 41 women staffers, including 17 booking clerks, 6 Railway Protection Force personnel, 8 ticket checkers, 5 point persons, 2 announcers and 2 cleaners working under the supervision of station manager Mrs. Mamta Kulkarni, making them eligible for the entry in Limca Book as first all-women station. Incidentally Mamta Kulkarni is first Assistant Station Manager to be recruited on Mumbai Division of Central Railway in 1992.

== Workshop ==
The Matunga Carriage Repair Workshop located just next to the railway station was built in 1915 in the area between the tracks of the Western and Central Lines. It was set up as a repair workshop for coaches and wagons of the Great Indian Peninsula Railway. It now carries out Periodical Overhaul (POH) and heavy corrosion repairs of main line and EMU coaches; in 2009/10 it attended 3182 coaches. In 2011 it had 7,719 staff.

The neighbouring station of Matunga Road station on Western Railway experienced terrorist bombings in 1993 and 2006 which were often described as being at "Matunga station".
