= Nanik Rupani =

Indian Entrepreneur (born 1941)

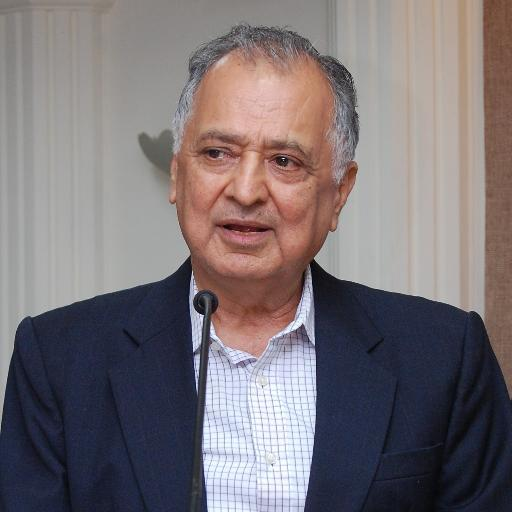
- Born: 1941 (age 84–85); Karachi, Pakistan
- Occupations: Chairman of Roopmeck Electricals Pvt. Ltd. Chairman Emeritus of Priyadarshni Academy; President Indo-American Chamber; Chairman of Mumbai Development Committee, Indian Merchants' Chamber
- Spouse: Geeta Rupani
- Children: Kiran Datwani; Reena Rupani
- Parent(s): Kisharam Rupani; Radha Rupani
- Website: Nanik Rupani

Nanik Rupani (born 1941) is an Indian Entrepreneur. He is also the Chairman Emeritus of Priyadarshni Academy, an NGO which provides educational scholarships to needy and deserving students. They promote the Indian classical performing arts among the youth.

He also introduced Contact Point on 27 November 1988. It was launched by M. C. Venkatram, Chief General Manager of MTNL. Considering the fact that telecommunication was introduced in India in 1950, landlines were only available for few and the rest had to face huge waiting periods for contacting someone. He was the first to start communications in the private sector.

== Early life ==
Rupani was born in undivided India (now Pakistan) in 1941. With a choiceless situation at the front, all the wealth and property was left and he moved to India with his family at the age of 6. Nanik and family moved to Wadala, a modest distant suburb of Mumbai. His father was a trader who later had to work as a commission agent with cloth dealers.

Nanik Rupani completed his schooling from Don Bosco School in 1956. At the age of 19, he dreamt of starting work and settling for a job that gives a steady income. He applied for a job at Accra in Ghana for which he was interviewed in Bombay (Now Mumbai). With a starting salary of Rs.150 per month, he sailed to Ghana on the West African Coast. As Ghana gained freedom in 1957 he became in charge of the M/s Bhojsons Warehouse and this later resulted in receiving a great experience from Star Trading House. With a deep love for his nation, he promoted Indian goods and products to all wherever he transacted.

As a college dropout, Nanik Rupani had restrictions while communicating in English. Due to lack of academics, he was paid 11 pounds while others were paid 30 pounds. Apart from the odds that he faced, he learned the language and helped himself overcome his obstructions. Unlike other youngsters, Nanik desired to return to his own country and be a part of its development. He returned to India in 1963.

== Career ==
- 1968- Treasurer of Lion’s Club of Wadala.
- 1964- Started powerloom in Bhiwandi (Roop Textiles and Radha Silk Industries)
- 1969- Nanik Silk Industries, Kalbadevi Marg, Mumbai.
- 1971- President of Wadala Junior Chamber.
- 1971- Hosted The Jawans Canteen During Indo-Pak War.
- 1971- Conducted All India Film Talent Contest.
- 1972- Eastmen Art Emporium, Nariman Point, Mumbai.
- 1972- Hind Decor, Mumbai.
- 1973- President Wadala Jaycee.
- 1975- Hind Industries, Dadar, Mumbai.
- 1975- Hind Industries turned to Roopmeck Enterprises due to immense success.
- 1979- Rupani Enterprises, Wadala, Mumbai.
- 1986- Neutron- Video Conferencing
- 1988- Contact Point was introduced at Nariman Point, Mumbai.

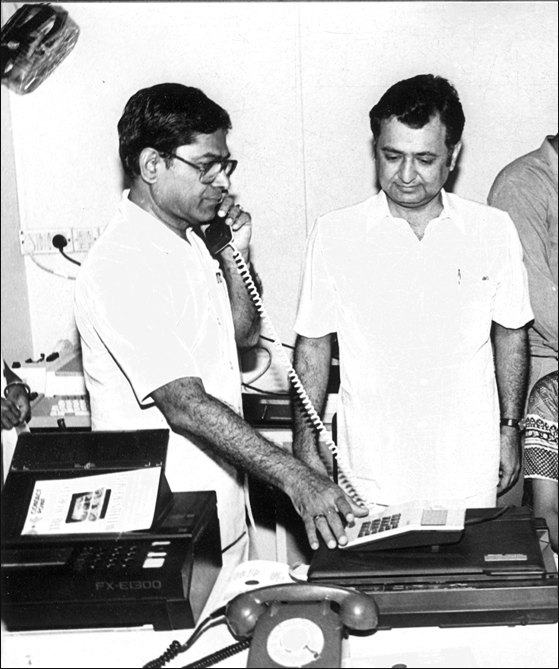
Nanik Rupani Introduces Contact Point at Nariman Point, Mumbai.

- 1993- Adino Telecom, Andheri, Mumbai.
- 1984- Priyadarshini Academy, Mumbai.
- 1993- Addressed a gathering in Parliament House, Delhi.
- 1995- Introduced Laughter Club (Hasya Yoga)
- 1998- Priyadarshini acquired a global recognition
- 2001- Established Vedanta Research Centre. (Joined hands with India International Multi-University.)
- 2004- Became the President of Indian Merchants’ Chamber
- 2005- Received Summa cum laude at Jai Hind College.
- 2006- Conferred The First Kriyasheel Global Awards From Sadguru Shri Mangeshda Kriya Yoga Foundation
- 2007- Integrity India Sub-Committee.
- 2008- Confederation of Indian Industry.
- 2009- Chairman of Programme Committee at Rotary Club India.
- 2010- Became the Non-Executive Director of ‘Aon Global Insurance Brokers Pvt. Ltd.’
- 2012- Became Regional President of Indo-American Chamber of Commerce, India.
- 2014- President of Indo-American Chamber of Commerce.

== Career Breakthrough ==
=== Neutron Electronic Systems Pvt Ltd ===
Neutron Electronic Systems Pvt Ltd was founded in the year 1986 by Nanik Rupani Group Enterprise. The video-conferencing in India was introduced by Neutron Electronic Systems Pvt Ltd in the year 1994.

== Other Business Venture ==
=== Roopmeck Electricals Pvt. Ltd. ===
Nanik Rupani founded Roopmeck Enterprises in the year 1975. The business provides the service of distribution of electrical cables, motors, switchgear, circuit breakers, energy saving devices and other industrial electrical products.

Roopmeck Enterprises became Roopmeck Electricals Pvt. Ltd. in the year 1984.

=== Global Insurance Brokers Pvt. Ltd. ===
Nanik Rupani became the Non- Executive Director of ‘Global Insurance Brokers Pvt. Ltd.’ in the year 2010. The company was founded in the year 2004 by Late Shri Bhagwandas Peraj Thakker and was previously known as ‘Aon Global Insurance Brokers Pvt’. The company started a joint venture with ‘Aon plc’ in 2003 which ended in 2015.

Global Insurance Brokers Pvt. Ltd. provides insurance services to aviation, sports, leisure, entertainment, counter-terrorism, liability and employee benefits.

== Philanthropy ==
=== Priyadarshni Academy ===
Nanik Rupani founded Priyadarshni Academy in 1985. It is a non-profit, socio-cultural and educational organization.

== Political Associations ==
=== Indo-American Chamber of Commerce, India ===
Established in 1968, the Indo-American Chamber of Commerce (IACC) is a non-government, industry-led and industry-managed organization, playing a proactive role in India’s development process and serves as a much-needed link between the business communities of India and the United States of America. IACC is the only bilateral Chamber of Commerce in India which is committed to the development of Indo-US business and trade relations.

=== Personal life ===
Rupani was born to Kisharam Rupani and Radha Rupani in undivided India (now Pakistan) in 1941. With a choiceless situation at the front, all the wealth and property was left behind by the family and they moved to India with nine children when Nanik was 6 years old. Nanik and family later moved to Wadala, a modest distant suburb of Mumbai. His father was a trader who later had to work as a commission agent with cloth dealers.

At a young age, he dreamt of starting work and settling for a job that gives a steady income. He applied for a job at Accra in Ghana for which he was interviewed in Bombay (Now Mumbai). With a starting salary of Rs.150 per month, he sailed to Ghana on the West African Coast. As Ghana gained freedom in 1957 he became in charge of the M/s Bhojsons Warehouse and this later resulted in receiving a great experience from Star Trading House. With a deep love for his nation, he promoted Indian goods and products to all wherever he transacted.

After returning to India in 1963, Nanik Rupani went through a series of business development and a few breakthroughs. He married Geeta Rupani (earlier Geeta Chandani, daughter of Ishwari and Dunichand Chandani) in May 1967. The couple had two daughters, Neeta (1969) and Reena (1975).

In 1971, during the Indo-Pak war, Nanik Rupani supported the Jawans. He started with a canteen to serve the Jawans who were severely injured in the war. As a part of Wadala Junior Chamber, he was financially and physically assisted by many other people. The canteen was held live for "As Long As The War Went On" as promised by Nanik at the 1971 press conference.

Nanik Rupani also faced a dicey situation where he was presented with a clearing notice for his house at Vikas Valley in Khandala. The Government had planned the construction of Mumbai-Pune Express Highway through the residential area. He cleared the situation by laying out a smart alternative route with the help of Balasaheb Thackeray.
