= Piramal =

Piramal is a surname. Notable people with the surname include:

- Ajay Piramal, Indian businessman
- Gita Piramal, Indian writer
- Swati Piramal, industrialist

== See also ==
- Piramal Group, diversified business conglomerate
- Piramal Glass, glass packaging company
