= Anand Piramal =

Indian businessman (born 1985)

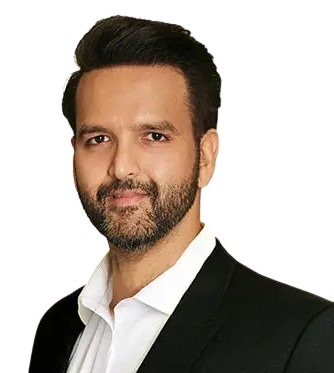
- Born: Anand Ajay Piramal; 25 October 1985 (age 41); Mumbai, Maharashtra, India
- Education: University of Pennsylvania (BA, Economics); Harvard Business School (MBA)
- Occupation: Business executive
- Organization: Piramal Group
- Title: Chairman, Piramal Finance
- Spouse: Isha Ambani (m. 2018)
- Children: 2
- Parent(s): Ajay Piramal; Swati Piramal

Anand Ajay Piramal (born 25 October 1985) is an Indian businessman. He is the chairman of Piramal Finance and an executive director of Piramal Group, where he also leads the group's real estate arm, Piramal Realty. He founded Piramal Realty in 2012 and Piramal Swasthya, a rural healthcare initiative, in 2008.

Piramal joined Piramal Finance's retail lending business in 2019 and, alongside his father, led the group's acquisition of Dewan Housing Finance Corporation (DHFL) in 2021, the first resolution of a financial services firm under India's Insolvency and Bankruptcy Code. He became chairman of Piramal Finance in September 2025 following the reverse merger of parent company Piramal Enterprises into the subsidiary. Piramal is the son of Ajay Piramal, chairman of the Piramal Group, and Swati Piramal. He married Isha Ambani, daughter of Mukesh Ambani and Nita Ambani, in December 2018; the couple have twins, born in November 2022.

== Early life and education ==
Piramal was born in Mumbai on 25 October 1985 to Ajay Piramal, chairman of the Piramal Group, and Swati Piramal. His elder sister, Nandini Piramal, is chairperson of Piramal Pharma. He earned a bachelor's degree in economics from the University of Pennsylvania and an MBA from Harvard Business School. As an undergraduate, he researched rural infrastructure and public health access in India, which led to his first venture, Piramal eSwasthya. Piramal has said that Mukesh Ambani, who later became his father-in-law, encouraged him to pursue entrepreneurship rather than a career in consulting or investment banking.

== Career ==
=== Healthcare ===
After completing his business education, Piramal founded Piramal eSwasthya, a rural healthcare initiative in Rajasthan. In 2010, he acquired the Health Management Research Institute (HMRI) and merged it into eSwasthya, and the combined programme was renamed Piramal Swasthya. Under his direction the initiative expanded through public–private partnerships with state governments across 20 Indian states. Piramal stepped down as chief executive in 2012, after which the organisation's focus shifted toward maternal and child health among vulnerable populations. Harvard Business School later used the venture as a case study in cross-sector collaboration in rural public health delivery.

=== Real estate ===
Piramal founded Piramal Realty, the Piramal Group's real estate development arm, in 2012. The company's residential and commercial developments in the Mumbai Metropolitan Region include Piramal Aranya, Piramal Mahalaxmi, Piramal Revanta and Piramal Vaikunth. In July 2015, private equity firm Warburg Pincus agreed to invest approximately US$284 million for a minority stake in Piramal Realty, followed a month later by a ₹900 crore investment from Goldman Sachs. The two transactions were among the largest private-equity investments in the Indian real estate sector at the time. Piramal is an executive director of Piramal Group and Piramal Enterprises.

=== Financial services ===
Piramal joined Piramal Finance's retail lending platform in 2019. Dewan Housing Finance Corporation (DHFL), then one of India's largest housing finance companies, had defaulted on its obligations in 2019 amid allegations of fraud and fund diversion, prompting the Reserve Bank of India to supersede its board and admit the company to the corporate insolvency resolution process under the Insolvency and Bankruptcy Code (IBC). Piramal, alongside his father Ajay Piramal, led the ₹34,250 crore (about US$4.7 billion) acquisition of DHFL. It was completed on 29 September 2021 and merged Piramal Capital & Housing Finance into DHFL. The deal was the first resolution of a financial services firm under the IBC and among the largest to date; it created an affordable-housing finance network spanning 24 Indian states. Some fixed-deposit and non-convertible-debenture holders of DHFL objected to the resolution plan because it recovered only a fraction of their dues, and a group of creditors challenged the payouts before the National Company Law Appellate Tribunal. In April 2025, the Supreme Court of India upheld Piramal Capital & Housing Finance's resolution plan for DHFL, setting aside the NCLAT order that had partly modified it. In September 2025, Piramal Enterprises completed a reverse merger into its financial services subsidiary, Piramal Finance, after the National Company Law Tribunal approved the merger on 10 September 2025. Piramal was appointed chairman of the merged entity, effective 16 September 2025, succeeding his father in that role; Ajay Piramal continued as chairman of the wider Piramal Group. Jairam Sridharan was named managing director and chief executive of Piramal Finance.

== Personal life ==
Piramal married Isha Ambani, daughter of Mukesh Ambani and Nita Ambani, in Mumbai in December 2018. The couple's twins were born on 19 November 2022.

== Recognition ==
- The Economic Times 40 Under Forty – 2024
- Fortune India 40 Under 40 – 2024
