= Gandhi Fellowship =

Residential educational leadership program in India

- Formation: 2008
- Founder: Ujjval Kumar Singh
- Type: Social work, educational leadership
- Legal status: Operational
- Headquarters: Bagar, Jhunjhunu
- Location: National
- Region served: India
- Website: gandhifellowship.org

Gandhi Fellowship is a two-year residential educational leadership program offered by Piramal School of leadership and Kaivalya Education Foundation. The program involves district and state-level bodies across India to enhance the public education system.

== History ==
The fellowship program was first started in 2008 at jhunjhunu and Churu districts of Rajasthan. Ujjval kumar singh is the CEO and Founder of the program.

== Vision ==
Gandhi Fellowship follows the ideology of "be the change that you wish to see in the world" by Mahatma Gandhi. The program was launched with an idea to change one million lives in India by 2025.
