= Roongta =

Marwari Agrawal Community in India

Roongta (Hindi: रूँगटा) are the Marwari Agrawal community originally belonging to the Town of Bagar (District Jhunjhunu) in Rajasthan, India. Community of Bagar, Pilani and Jhunjhunu.

== History ==
=== Origin ===
Rungtas and Roongtas hail from the villages/towns of Baggar-Mandrella-Pilani, all situated in District of Jhunjhunu(Rajasthan) in Shekhawati Region.

The name Roongta/ Rungta comes from "raghunathji" who was brother-in-law to "chao sati dadi". Rungtas respect "dadi" as their goddess.

== Communication ==
Before widespread use of the internet, regular newsletters used to be circulated to those who belonged to the Roongta community. This monthly newsletter used to give a wide array of updates to all the Roongtas; including information about education, professional successes and weddings. The idea was to help all the Roongtas stay in touch with each other.
