= Dilip Piramal =

Indian businessman (born 1949)

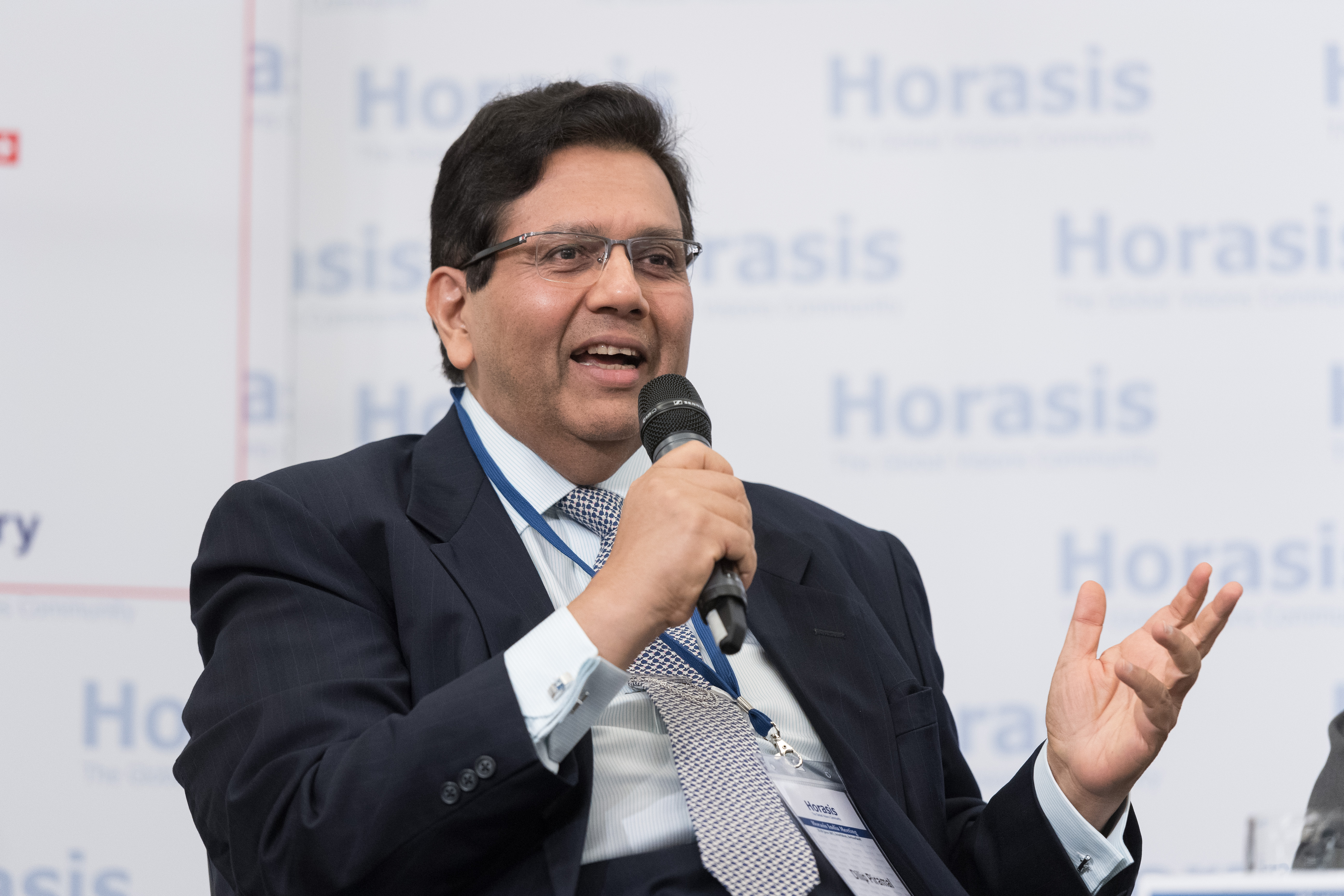
- Piramal in 2017
- Born: 2 November 1949 (age 76); Mumbai, India
- Education: Sydenham College of Commerce and Economics (BComm)
- Occupation: Businessman
- Known for: VIP Luggage
- Title: Chairman VIP Industries
- Board member of: VIP Industries
- Spouses: Gita Piramal (m. 1975; div. 2005); Shalini Piramal (m. 2005)
- Children: 3

Dilip Piramal (born 2 November 1949) is an Indian businessman. He is the chairman of the VIP Industries, India's largest luggage manufacturer.

== Early life and education ==
Dilip Piramal was born on 2 November 1949, in Mumbai, the second of the three sons of Gopikishan Piramal, himself the son of Piramal Chaturbhuj, founder of the family fortune. His older brother, Ashok Piramal, died due to cancer in 1984, while his younger brother is Ajay Piramal. Piramal received a Bachelor of Commerce degree from Sydenham College of Commerce and Economics in 1970.

== Career ==
The fortunes of the Piramal business family were founded by Piramal Chatrabhuj, a man from a traditional tradesman family who opened a textile business in 1934. Gopikishan Piramal, father of Dilip Piramal, was the son of Piramal Chaturbhuj.

Piramal began his career as a director of Morarjee Mills in 1970. In 1973, he was also made director of Blow Plast (parent of VIP luggage). In 1975, he took the position of a managing director of Morarjee Mills. In 1979, his father Gopikishan died suddenly. In 1980, the brothers came to an agreement, where Dilip separated out while his two brothers remained together. Dilip Piramal resigned from Morarjee Mills and took over complete control of Blow PLast/VIP as chairman and managing director. His two brothers Ashok and Ajay took over the family's textile business, later diversifying into many other sectors. His older brother, Ashok Piramal, died in 1984 of cancer leaving behind his wife (aged 32) and three sons, all toddlers.

== Personal life ==
Dilip has been married twice. His first wife was the author Gita Piramal; they married in 1975 and divorced in 2005. They have two daughters, Radhika and Aparna. Radhika is lesbian and has a wife, Amanda. Aparna is married to Amit Raje, a man from a Maratha family, and they are the parents of two children. Aparna has bipolar disorder.

Dilip and Gita Piramal were divorced in 2005. Later that same year, 56-year-old Dilip Piramal married 42-year-old Shalini Agarwal. They have one daughter, Priyadarshini.
