= Piramal Realty =

Indian real estate company

- Type: Private
- Industry: Real estate, Construction
- Founded: 2012; 14 years ago in Mumbai, India
- Founder: Anand Piramal (Director)
- Headquarters: Mumbai, India
- Key people: Abhijeet Maheshwari (CEO)
- Services: Development of luxury commercial and residential properties
- Parent: Piramal Group
- Website: Official website

Piramal Realty is an Indian real estate company, founded in 2012 and headquartered in Mumbai, India. It is a part of the Piramal Group. The company focuses on the development of residential and commercial properties, with projects under development covering an estimated 15 million square feet. Among its notable projects include Piramal Aranya, Piramal Mahalaxmi, Piramal Revanta, Piramal Vaikunth and Piramal Agastya.

== History ==
The company was founded in 2012 as a real estate arm of Piramal Group led by Ajay Piramal.

In July 2015, Piramal Realty raised $234 million from private equity firms Warburg Pincus and Goldman Sachs, making it one of the largest investment in India's real estate sector.

The company has acquired multiple land parcels for development in Mumbai. In April 2012, it acquired a sea-facing property from Hindustan Unilever Limited in Worli, Mumbai, for ₹452 crore. In June 2011, Piramal Realty acquired a 7-acre plot in Byculla from Mafatlal Industries for ₹605.80 crores, however, Business Today reports it to be ₹753 crores. It purchased 3.2 acres of land parcel in Mulund from rival Nirmal Lifestyles for ₹153 crores in 2017.
