= Bagar, India =

Bagar, India may refer to:

- Bagar, Jhunjhunu, village in Rajasthan
- Bagar, Pauri Garhwal, Uttarakhand
