= Piramal Finance =

Indian non-banking financial company

Piramal Finance Limited
- Type: Public
- Industry: Financial services
- Founded: April 11, 1984; 42 years ago (as Dewan Housing Finance Corporation)
- Headquarters: Mumbai, India
- Key people: Ajay Piramal (Chairman, Piramal Group); Anand Piramal (Chairman, Piramal Finance); Jairam Sridharan (MD & CEO)
- Products: Home loans; Business loans; Corporate financing; Loans against property; Personal loans; Loans against mutual funds
- Revenue: ₹9,913 crore (FY2025)
- Net income: ▲₹1,506 crore (FY2026)
- AUM: ₹1.13 lakh crore (September 2026)
- Parent: Piramal Group
- Website: piramalfinance.com

Piramal Finance Limited (PFL) is an Indian non-banking financial company (NBFC) with its headquarters in Mumbai. It is the financial services arm of the Piramal Group and became the group's primary financial services company following a corporate restructuring completed in September 2025.

The company originated as Piramal Capital & Housing Finance Limited (PCHFL). In 2021, PCHFL acquired Dewan Housing Finance Corporation (DHFL) through insolvency proceedings under the Insolvency and Bankruptcy Code. After the acquisition, the two companies were merged, and the combined business continued under the PCHFL name before being renamed Piramal Finance Limited.

In April 2025, the Reserve Bank of India (RBI) reclassified the company from a Housing Finance Company (HFC) to an Investment and Credit Company (NBFC-ICC). The RBI places it in the upper layer of its scale-based regulatory framework for NBFCs. In September 2025, its parent company, Piramal Enterprises Limited (PEL), merged into it, making it the Piramal Group's single listed financial services entity. The company provides retail housing finance, MSME lending, and wholesale lending to the real estate and corporate mid-market sectors.

== History ==
=== Piramal Capital & Housing Finance ===
Piramal Housing Finance Private Limited was incorporated in February 2017 as a wholly owned subsidiary of Piramal Finance Limited. It was incorporated on 10 February 2017, became a public company on 28 September 2017 and was renamed Piramal Housing Finance Limited. The company received registration from the National Housing Bank on 1 December 2017 and, on 12 February 2020, obtained a fresh certificate of registration from the Reserve Bank of India to operate as a housing finance institution without accepting public deposits.

With effect from 31 March 2018, Piramal Finance Limited and Piramal Capital Limited were amalgamated with Piramal Housing Finance Limited, after which the entity was renamed Piramal Capital & Housing Finance Limited (PCHFL). It became a wholly owned subsidiary of Piramal Enterprises Limited.

Before the acquisition of DHFL, PCHFL's lending business was concentrated mainly in wholesale real estate and corporate finance. Retail lending represented about 11% of assets under management (AUM) on a pre-merger basis as of 30 June 2021.

Piramal Enterprises also entered into partnerships with institutional investors. In February 2017, it announced a joint investment platform with Ivanhoé Cambridge, the real estate subsidiary of CDPQ, to provide long-term equity capital to residential developers across five Indian cities, with Ivanhoé Cambridge allocating an initial US$250 million. Piramal Enterprises and CDPQ also established a performing credit platform for private debt financing in India, and the India Resurgence Fund (IndiaRF), a distressed asset buyout platform jointly sponsored with Bain Capital Credit.

The company later broadened its retail portfolio, offering home loans to customers in the affordable housing and mass-affluent segments and adding products including loans to small businesses and working capital finance.

=== Acquisition of DHFL and reorganization ===
In September 2021, the Piramal Group acquired DHFL for ₹34,250 crore under a resolution plan approved by the Committee of Creditors through proceedings under the Insolvency and Bankruptcy Code. DHFL had entered insolvency in 2019 after governance lapses and loan defaults. Under the approved resolution plan, Piramal Capital & Housing Finance Limited (PCHFL) was reverse-merged into DHFL with effect from 30 September 2021. The surviving company was renamed Piramal Capital & Housing Finance Limited in November 2021 and kept DHFL's branch network and customer relationships.

The acquisition expanded the company's retail lending business. By December 2021, retail loans accounted for 36% of the consolidated loan book, compared with about 11% before the merger. At that time, the combined business operated 301 branches across 24 states.

On 1 April 2025, the Reserve Bank of India approved the company's conversion from a housing finance company to an investment and credit company. The company then surrendered its HFC registration.

In May 2024, Piramal Enterprises Limited announced a plan to merge into its wholly owned subsidiary PCHFL, with the aim of simplifying the group's structure and letting shareholders hold the lending business directly. Under the scheme, PEL shareholders were to receive shares in the merged company, which would be renamed Piramal Finance. As an upper-layer NBFC, the company was required by RBI regulations to list by September 2025. The scheme received RBI approval on 8 April 2025 and approval from the National Company Law Tribunal on 11 September 2025, and became effective on 16 September 2025.

== Operations ==
As of September 2026, Piramal Finance reported AUM of ₹1.13 lakh crore, an increase of 24% year on year. Retail AUM stood at ₹97,462 crore and wholesale AUM at ₹13,978 crore. The company operated 838 branches across 621 cities in 25 states and served about 6.5 million customers. Retail lending accounted for about 85% of AUM.

The company's retail products include housing loans, loans against property, used car loans, business loans, salaried personal loans and digital loans, and it lends mainly to borrowers in semi-urban and rural areas across tier II and tier III markets. It also provides loans to micro, small and medium enterprises (MSMEs).

Wholesale lending is divided between a current book, which the company calls Wholesale 2.0, and a legacy portfolio originated before 2021 that it has been running down. The legacy book declined 32% sequentially to about 1.5% of total AUM as of September 2026.

The company's funding is diversified across domestic bank borrowings, non-convertible debentures, mutual funds, securitisation and international borrowings. External commercial borrowings accounted for around 9% of total borrowings, and the company raised US$815 million through such borrowings in the 2025 financial year. In early 2026, it secured US$350 million in financing from the International Finance Corporation (IFC) and the Asian Development Bank (ADB) to support affordable housing and MSME lending. The company also operates co-lending arrangements with scheduled commercial banks, including Axis Bank and RBL Bank.

== Subsidiaries ==
=== Pramerica Life Insurance ===
Pramerica Life Insurance Limited is a life insurance joint venture between Piramal Finance Limited and Prudential International Insurance Holdings Ltd., a subsidiary of Prudential Financial. The company was incorporated on 1 September 2008 as DLF Pramerica Life Insurance Company Ltd., initially as a joint venture between DLF Limited and Prudential Financial. In 2013, DHFL acquired a majority stake in the business, which became DHFL Pramerica Life Insurance. It later adopted the name Pramerica Life Insurance. The stake is held through DHFL Investments Limited, a wholly owned subsidiary of Piramal Finance, which holds 50% of the venture.

== Legal matters and controversies ==
=== SEBI insider trading investigation ===
In 2024, the Securities and Exchange Board of India (SEBI) settled an insider trading investigation involving the former managing director of Piramal Capital & Housing Finance and several associated parties. The investigation concerned alleged trading in shares of Piramal Enterprises while in possession of unpublished price-sensitive information. Under the settlement, the parties agreed to pay about ₹43.5 crore without admitting or denying the findings, in accordance with SEBI's settlement regulations.
