= VIP Industries =

Indian luggage company

VIP Industries Ltd
- Type: Public
- Traded as: BSE: 507880; NSE: VIPIND
- Industry: Luggage
- Founded: 1971; 55 years ago
- Founder: Dilip Piramal
- Headquarters: Mumbai, Maharashtra, India
- Area served: Worldwide
- Key people: Dilip G. Piramal (chairman); Radhika Piramal (MD)
- Products: Baggage; Suitcases
- Revenue: ▲₹2,082 crore (US$220 million) (2022–23)
- Number of employees: 5,000
- Parent: DG Piramal Group
- Subsidiaries: Aristocrat; Caprese; Carlton; Skybags
- Website: vipindustries.co.in

VIP Industries Ltd is an Indian luggage manufacturing company, based in Mumbai, Maharashtra. It manufactures luggage and travel accessories, and is the world's second-largest, as well as India and Asia's largest luggage manufacturer. The company has more than 8,000 retail outlets across India and a network of retailers in 50 countries. Skybags contributes the largest share (33%) of VIP Industries. It acquired UK-based luggage brand Carlton in 2004.

== History ==
The history of the company goes back to the year 1970. Since then, the company has recorded a sale of around 10 crore (100 million) pieces of luggage worldwide. Formerly, the company was known by the name Aristo Plast VIP Industries and it was incorporated in 1968. The company consisted of two wholly owned subsidiary companies, namely Blow Plast Retail Limited V.I.P. Industries Bangladesh Private Limited V.I.P. Industries BD Manufacturing Private Limited and V.I.P. Luggage BD Private Limited. As of 31 March 2019 the company has one Indian and four overseas wholly owned subsidiaries.

1971 – at Nasik, the company's manufacturing factory was commissioned

1982 – at Jalgaon, a new manufacturing facility was inaugurated.

1983 – introduction of new technology, known as the NR mechanism, which kept the bags closed in an upside-down position.

1986 – set-up of a new manufacturing unit at Nagpur and introduction of a padded handle on the bags.

1989 – the company introduced a new brand by the name Alfa.

The dual-action lock was introduced in the bags.

1993 – at Sinnar a new manufacturing facility was set up.

1995 – the heat-sealing method was introduced. Also, the dual-material dimpled bumper was introduced, allowing for the rough usage of luggage.

1998 – the vertical access feature was launched.

2000 – similarly, other technologies such as the cable lock were also introduced. Soft luggage inside hard luggage i.e. Convipack was introduced by the company.

2002 – the paper frame and handle-locking mechanism were introduced.

2003 – the FM radio in the luggage category was launched.

2004 – the company acquired Carlton and extended its presence in the global market to around 65 countries.

2011 – four-wheel bag technology was used for the first time in India.

== Awards ==
- Rajiv Gandhi National Quality Award – 2003
- Golden Peacock Innovation Award – 2004

== Brands ==
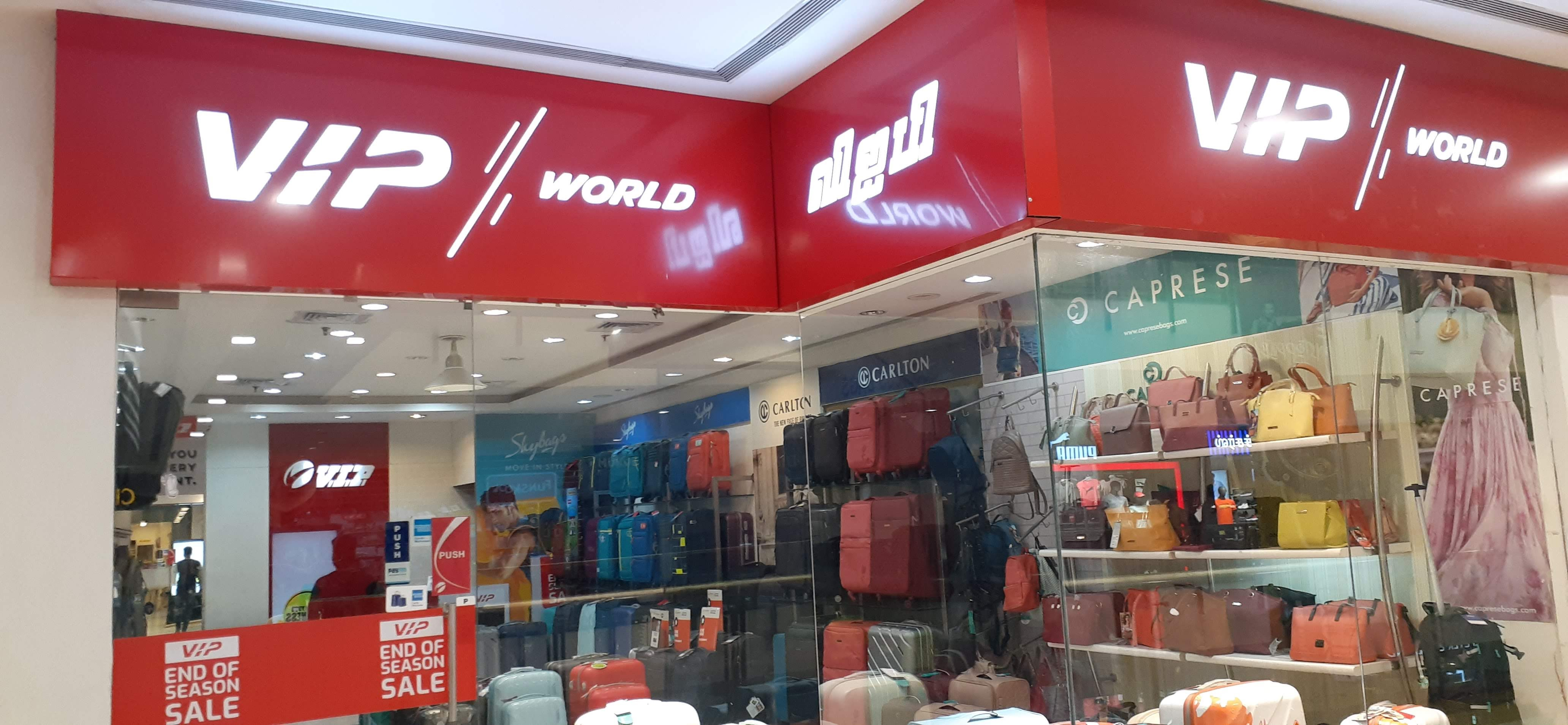
VIP World outlet, Chennai, Tamil Nadu, India

The company's brands include:

- Aristocrat
- Alfa
- Caprese
- Carlton
- VIP Bags
- Skybags
