= The Smart Manager =

Indian management magazine

- Managing Editor: Tanmoy Goswami
- Former editors: Gita Piramal
- Categories: Business, Management
- Frequency: 6 times per year
- Publisher: Spenta Multimedia
- First issue: February 2002
- Company: The Smart Manager Media Pvt. Ltd.
- Country: India
- Based in: Mumbai, Maharashtra, India
- Language: English
- Website: http://www.thesmartmanager.com

The Smart Manager is India's first management magazine, launched in 2002 and published quarterly; the magazine has since changed to a bi-monthly publishing frequency. The magazine is published by Spenta MultiMedia and was initially founded by Mumbai business people Gita Piramal, Nitin Nohria and Sumantra Ghoshal, with Piramal as the editor. The magazine has a knowledge partnership with CNBC-TV18 (the Indian venture of CNBC) and is hosted on their online platform.
