= Bagar, Jhunjhunu =

Bagar
- village
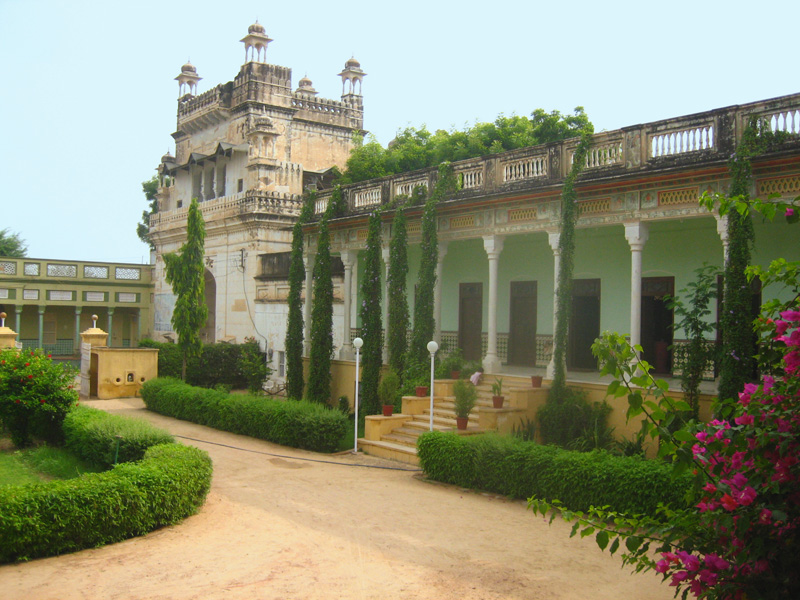
- Piramal Haveli

- Located in Rajasthan, India Bagar (India)
- Coordinates: 28.18°N 75.50°E
- Country: India
- State: Rajasthan
- District: Jhunjhunu
- Elevation: 315 m (1,033 ft)

Population (2011)
  - Total: 14,238

Languages
  - Official: Hindi
- Time zone: UTC+5:30 (IST)
- PIN: 333023
- Telephone code: 01592
- ISO 3166 code: RJ-IN
- Vehicle registration: RJ 18
- Website: www.bagar.org

Bagar, or Baggar, is a town and municipal council in the Jhunjhunu district of Rajasthan, a northwestern state in India. Known for its heritage havelis (mansions with frescoes), it is located 12 kilometres (7.5 mi) from Jhunjhunu city on NH 8 towards Chirawa-Loharu.

== Geography ==
Bagar is located at 28.18°N 75.50°E in the semi-arid, historical Shekhawati region of Rajasthan, 12 kilometres (7.5 mi) from Jhunjhunu city on National Highway 8 towards Chirawa-Loharu. It has an average elevation of 315 m (1,033 ft) Bagar is on State Highway 8, which connects the district headquarters of Jhunjhunu to the towns of Pilani and Chirawa.

== Demographics ==
As of the 2011 Indian census, Bagar has a population of 14,238. Males constitute 7,307, or 51% of the population, and females 6,931, or 49%. Bagar has an average literacy rate of 79.81%, higher than the state average of 66.11%, with 89.98% of the males and 68.20% of females being literate. 1,729, or 12.14% of the population, are under 6 years of age.

== Events ==
One of the many different important events in Bagar is the festival of Gangaur, arranged by the Rajput and Rajpurohit families.

== Temples ==
Bagar has some beautiful and renowned temples:

- Chavo Veero Sati temple
- Riddhi Siddhi Hanuman temple
- Shri Shyam temple
- Durga temple
- Shiv Ji temple
- Baba Chandranath temple
- Sheetla Mata temple
- Shani temple
- Icchapuran Balaji temple
- Baba Bhooth Nath Temple
- Shree Veer Hanuman Temple, Pahari Mohalla

== Havelis ==
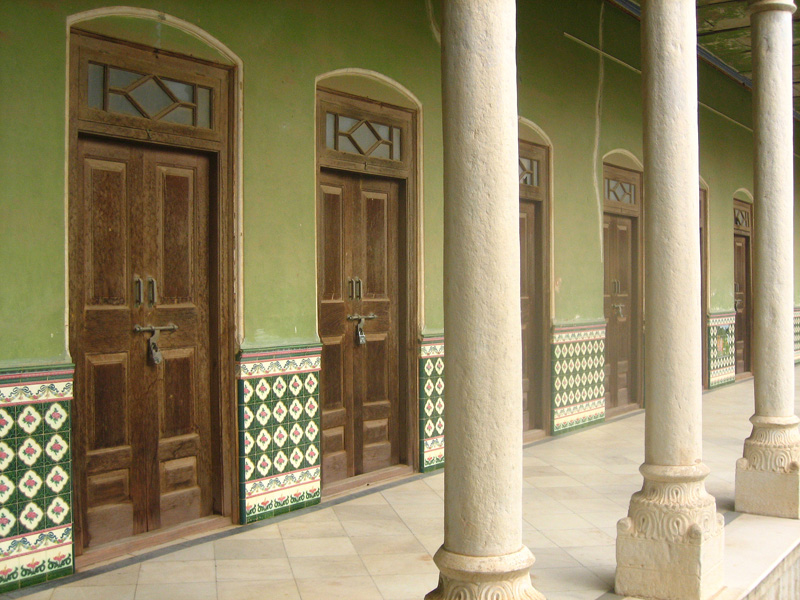
Hallway of Piramal Haveli heritage hotel, Bagar

Bagar contains many havelis (mansions) with frescoes on the walls.

The Piramal Haveli, currently run by Neemrana Hotels, is also in Bagar.

== Education ==
Strategically situated between Jhunjhunu city and Chirawa city, and with a population of over 10,000, Bagar is known as an education hub. The town is the ancestral home of many Marwari business families who have invested heavily in schools, and it has 32 educational institutions for local citizens and students from neighboring towns and cities.

The growing willingness by villagers to pay for private education has led to the creation of many new schools in recent years. The town population fluctuates with the advent of each academic year.

Bagar is home to the Piramal, B. L. (Maheshwari), Chavo Veero, Swaroop senior secondary schools, and K.S. International Academy, Krishna Devi Maheshwari Pharmacy College, Seth GDSB Patwari College, Shivonker Maheshwari Technical Institute, and Sanskrit College.

Pratham is the largest non-governmental organization (NGO) working to provide high-quality education to the under-privileged children of India. It has nationwide programs, such as Balwadis (Read India and ASER), and other vocational skills and computer-aided literacy programs.

The ISKCON Food Relief Foundation oversees the government of India's midday meal scheme, a school lunch project that reaches many children, to feed them and keep them in school. The Piramal Foundation pledged to feed 50,000 additional children every day.

== See also ==
- Baggar
- Bagar (disambiguation)
- Gita Piramal
