= PGP Glass =

Indian glass packaging company

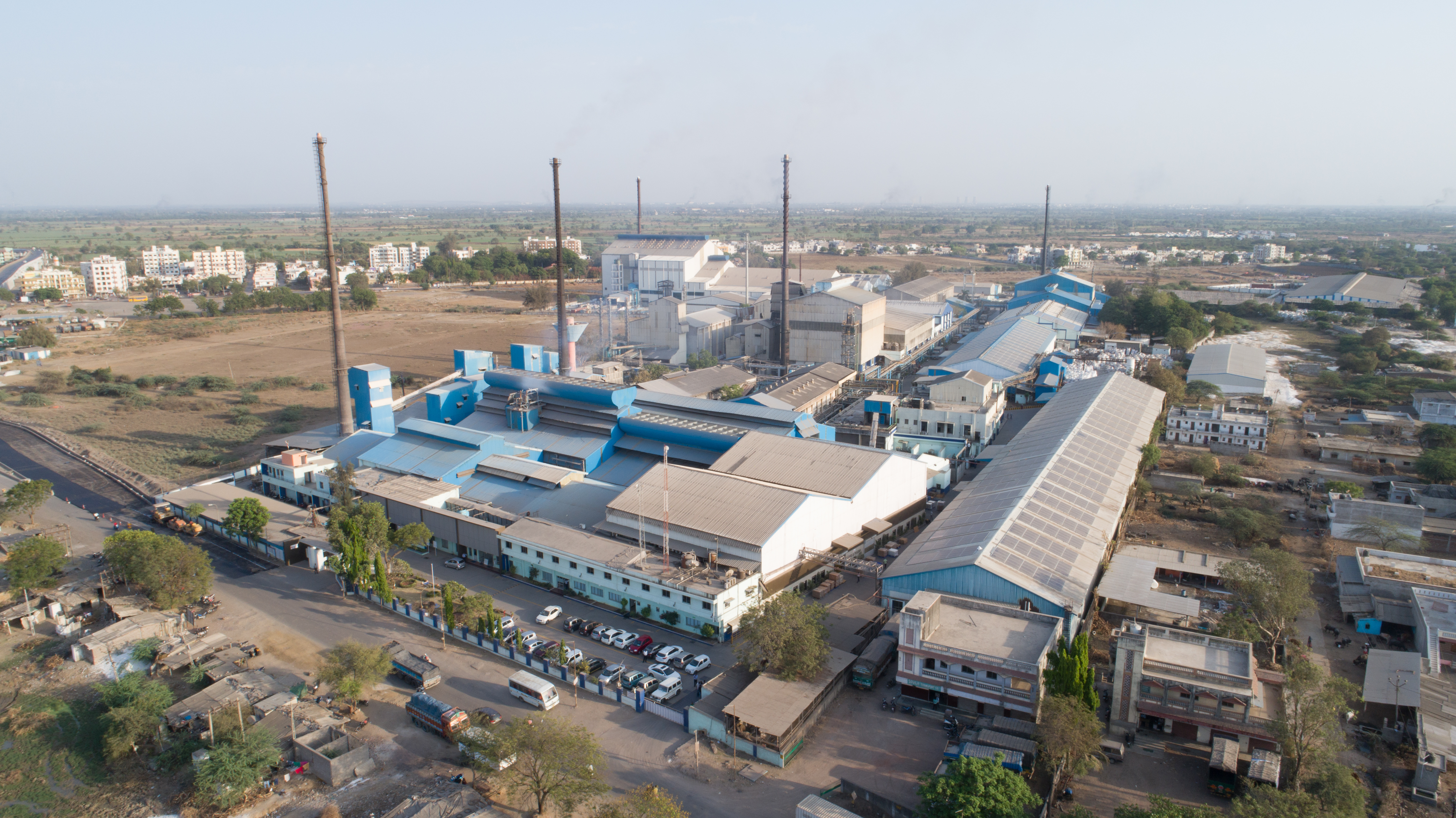
- PGP Glass Kosamba manufacturing unit
- Formerly: Piramal Glass Limited; Gujarat Glass Private Limited
- Company type: Private
- Industry: Containers; Packaging
- Founded: 1984
- Headquarters: Mumbai, Maharashtra, India
- Area served: Worldwide
- Products: Cosmetics and Perfumery, Pharmaceuticals, Specialty Food and Beverages, Decorations
- Revenue: ▲₹4,000 crore (US$420 million) (FY24)
- Operating income: ▲₹1,162 crore (US$120 million) (FY24)
- Parent: Piramal Group (1984–2021); The Blackstone Group (2021–present)
- Website: www.pgpfirst.com

PGP Glass (formerly known as Piramal Glass Ltd and Gujarat Glass Pvt. Ltd.) is an Indian glass packaging company providing packaging for pharmaceutical and perfume industries.

== History ==
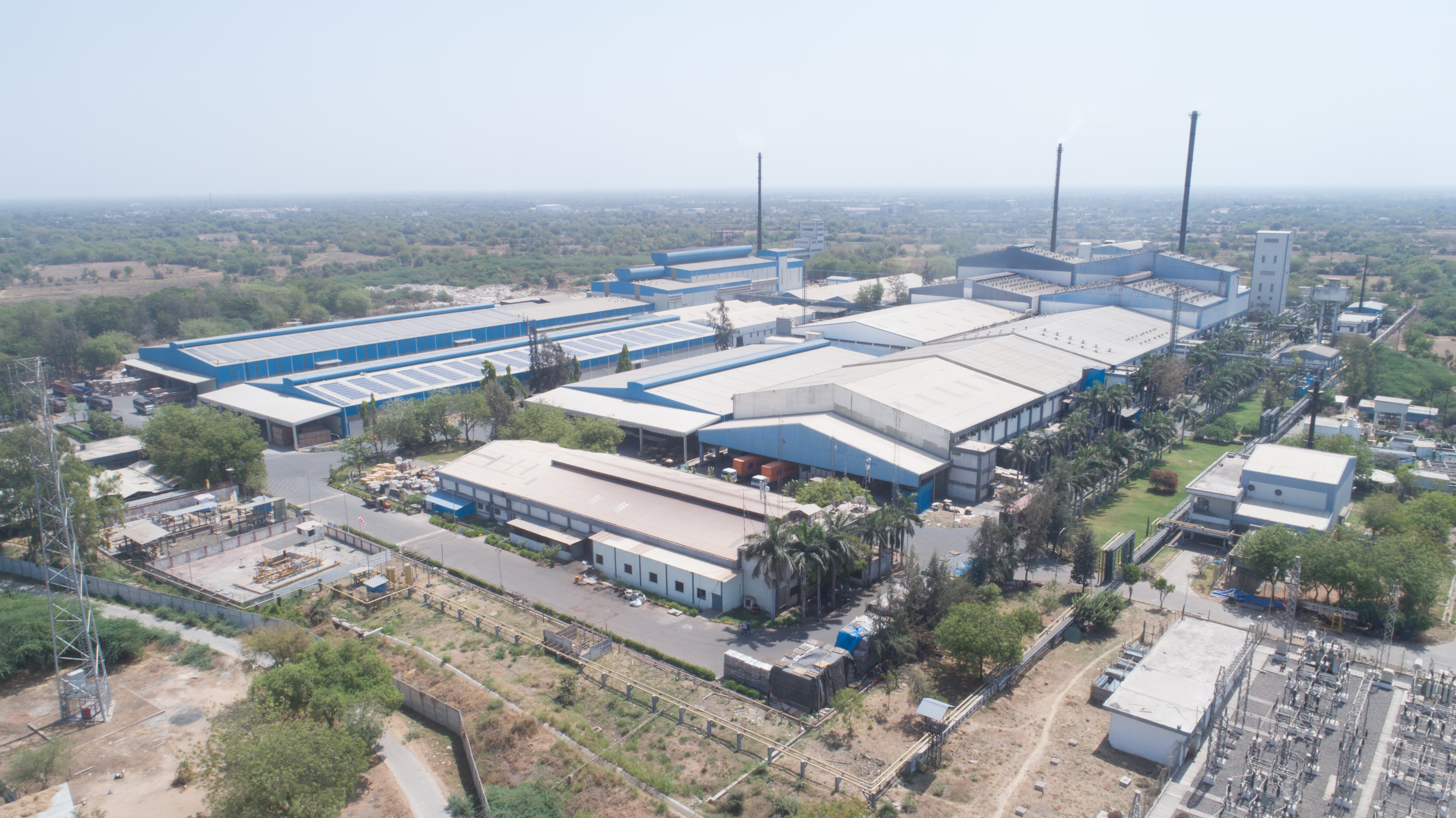
PGP Glass Jambusar manufacturing unit

Prior to its acquisition by the Piramal Group in 1984, the company's manufacturing plant was located in Kosamba, Gujarat. In 1990, Gujarat Glass Pvt. Ltd. merged with its parent company Nicholas Piramal India Ltd. to become one of its many divisions.

In 2020, The Blackstone Group announced that it would acquire Piramal Glass for US$1 billion. After the acquisition was completed in March 2021, the company was renamed to PGP Glass.

== Operations ==
The company sells glass packaging for the pharmaceuticals, food and beverages (F&B) and the cosmetics & perfumery (C&P) industries.

The Specialty Food and Beverage segment provides bottles for wine, liquor and food industry. This segment is primarily catered by the Sri Lanka and US operations serving customers such as Cadbury Schweppes, Diageo, Pernod Ricard, UB Group etc.

The company has its manufacturing facilities in India (Kosamba and Jambusar), Sri Lanka and the United States. The Kosamba facility has six furnaces – one for Pharma and five for C&P -- with a combined capacity of 330 TPD. The Jambusar facility is one of the world's largest installed capacities for pharmaceutical packaging in amber glass. It has 3 furnaces with a combined capacity of 520 TPD.

In Sri Lanka, the company has 1 furnace in Horana with a capacity of 250 TPD for producing both flint and amber bottles.

In February 2011, Piramal Glass stated that they would be investing Rs.100 crore on capacity expansion at its Jambusar unit in Gujarat through a greenfield project. The project was deemed to be completed by 2011-12. Furthermore, the company proposed to transfer 75 tonnes of its current capacity in the pharmaceutical segment to the C&P business. It also stated its plans to streamline its global operations in the countries like USA and Sri Lanka.
