= Radhika Piramal =

Business executive

- Education: MBA from Harvard Business School
- Occupation: Businessperson

Radhika Piramal is currently the Vice Chairperson of VIP Industries. She was appointed Managing Director in 2010 and held that role until 2017. Previously, she has also served as Executive Director of the company. She is a graduate from Oxford University & has an MBA from Harvard Business School. She is one of the few openly lesbian Indian corporate leaders. She launched the Pride Fund India, a philanthropic initiative in 2025 to help serve vulnerable and marginalised queer communities in India

Radhika was married in London to Amanda in 2011. She has spoken publicly about her sisters experiences with bipolar disorder.
