= Gita Piramal =

Indian historian

- Born: 1954; India
- Occupation: Writer, historian

Gita Piramal (born 1954) is an Indian writer and business historian.

== Education ==
Gita Piramal completed her education in the United Kingdom and graduated from Bombay University. She holds a PhD in business history (1988), a Master's degree in History (1981), and a Bachelor of Art in History of the West (1977).

== Career ==
Gita Piramal serves as a Senior Associate Fellow at Somerville College, University of Oxford. She has worked as an entrepreneur and businesswoman, a journalist and writer.

Piramal founded The Smart Manager, a management magazine, which she led from 2002 to 2012. She also headed ERGO (2005-2012), a furniture manufacturer, from 2005 to 2012 and was a director at VIP Luggage from 1990 to 2005. Currently, she serves as a non-executive board member at Bajaj Auto, Bajaj Finance, Bajaj Finserv and Bajaj Holdings & Investments.

Piramal conceptualized and created content for three programs on CNBC-TV18. She scripted, edited, and appeared in or anchored over 100 television documentaries and contributed more than 1,500 articles to international and Indian publications.

== Published writings ==
=== Books ===
- Kamalnayan Bajaj: Architect of the Bajaj Group (2015), Kamalnayan Bajaj Charitable Trust Book, Pune
- The Quotable Tycoon (2008), with David Olive, Penguin Books India, New Delhi
- Managing Radical Change (2000), with Sumantra Ghoshal and Christopher Bartlett, Penguin Books India, Delhi
- Business Mantras (1999), with Aparna Piramal, Radhika Piramal, and Mukund Beriwala, Penguin Books India, Delhi
- Business Legend (1998), Penguin Books India, Delhi
- Business Maharajas (1997), Penguin Books India, Delhi
- India’s Industrialists (1985), with Margaret Herdeck, Three Continents Press, Washington

=== Book chapters ===
- ‘The Bombay Plan and the Frustrations of Sir Ardeshir Dalal'. Chapter in Sanjaya Baru (ed). ‘The Bombay Plan’. Rupa Publications. 2018.
- ‘Ratan Tata’ and ‘J.R.D.Tata’ chapters in ‘The Tata Saga’. Penguin, 2018.
- ‘Animal Spirits: Stray Thoughts on the Nature of Entrepreneurship in India's Business Families after Liberalization'. Chapter in Rakesh Mohan (ed). 'India Transformed: 25 Years of Economic Reforms'. Penguin Random House India. 2017.
- 'Dhirubhai Ambani', 'Rahul Bajaj', 'Ratan Tata' and 'Walchand Hirachand'. Chapters in ‘The Portfolio Book of Great Indian Business Stories: Riveting Tales of Business Leaders and Their Times’. New Delhi: Penguin Books India Pvt Ltd. 2015.
- ‘Succession Planning Under The Banyan Tree'. Chapter in ‘Business Standard 2008’. BS Books, New Delhi, 2008.
- ‘The Old Fox'. Chapter in ‘The Non-Fiction Collection: 20 Years of Penguin India’. Volume 3, Penguin Books India, New Delhi, 2007.
- ‘The Elixir of Entrepreneurship’. Chapter in S V Prabhath (ed). ‘Women Entrepreneurs in India: challenges and achievements. National Institute of Small Industry Extension. Hyderabad. 2002.
- ‘Dhirubhai Ambani’, ‘GD Birla’, ‘JRD Tata’, ‘MK Gandhi’, ‘N Murty’, ‘Rahul Bajaj’, and ‘Sumantra Ghoshal’. Morgen Witzel (ed). Entries in ‘The Biographical Dictionary of Management’. Thoemmes Press. Bristol, UK. 2001.
- ‘New Maharajas’. Chapter in ‘Footprints of Enterprise – Indian Business Through the Ages’. FICCI. Delhi. 1997.
- ‘JRD Tata and GD Birla’. Chapter in Ayaz Menon (ed). ‘India 50 – the Making of a Nation’. Book Quest. Mumbai. 1997.
- ‘Entrepreneurs and Political Awareness - a Study of Bombay’s Business Groups’. Chapter in Dwijendra Tripathi (ed). ‘Business and Politics – A Historical Perspective’. Indian Institute of Management Ahmedabad. 1991.

=== Edited volumes ===
- Sumantra Ghoshal on Management: A Force for Good (2005), with Julian Birkinshaw, FT Prentice Hall. London
- Smart Leadership: Insights for CEOs (2005), with Jennifer Netarwala, Penguin Books India, Delhi

== Personal life ==
Gita Piramal married businessman Dilip Piramal, chairman and managing director of Blow Plast (VIP Luggage), in 1985. They have two daughters, Radhika and Aparna. The couple divorced in 2005.
