= Piramal Foundation =

Indian philanthropic organization

- Founded: 2006
- Headquarters: Mumbai, Maharashtra, India,
- Key people: Ajay Piramal (Chairperson cum Managing Director)
- Revenue: 352,401,000 Indian rupee (2024)
- Total assets: 121,517,000 Indian rupee (2024)
- Parent: Piramal Group
- Website: piramalfoundation.org

Piramal Foundation is the philanthropic arm of Piramal Group. The foundation undertakes projects under the four broad areas – healthcare, education, livelihood creation and youth empowerment. These projects are rolled out in partnership with various communities, corporate citizens, NGO’s and government bodies.

== Projects ==
=== Swasthya ===
Piramal Swasthya earlier known as Health Management and Research Institute (HMRI) is a non-profit organization supported by Piramal Foundation. The project has signed deal with the Karnataka government to provide a Health Information Help Line Services in the state through 104 BSNL telephone number. This service is called "Arogya Vani". The helpline service works towards providing basic medical information, advice, counseling without visiting a doctor, pharmacist or a health center. Piramal Swasthya in association with National Rural Health Mission (NRHM), Assam has set up a call centre for pregnant women in Assam. The efforts are focused towards reducing the Maternity Mortality Rate (MMR) and Infant Mortality Rate (IMR) through this initiative.

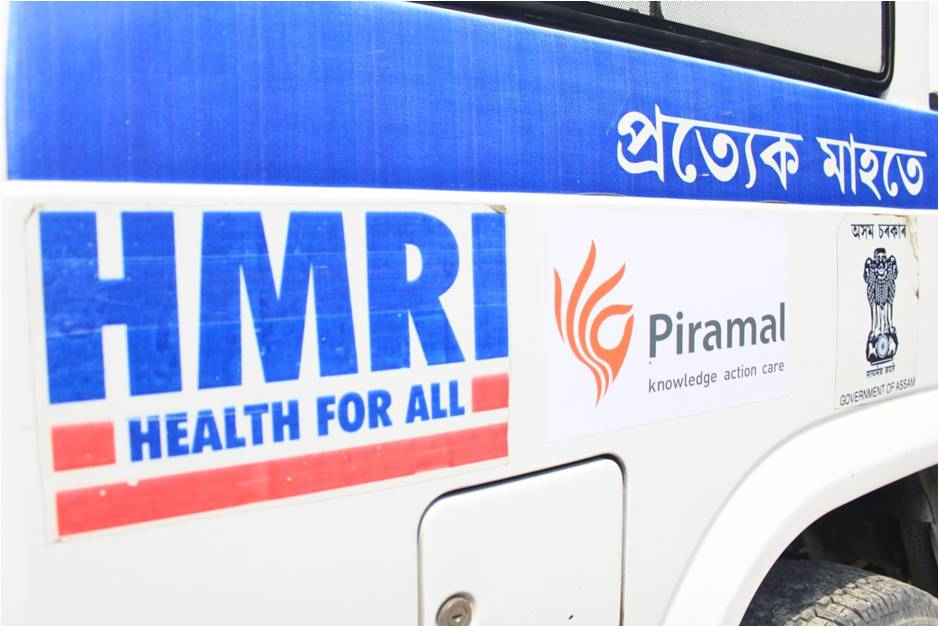
Piramal HMRI

=== Sarvajal ===
Sarvajal is a social enterprise that provides clean water through Water ATM’s. The Water ATM is in essence a modular RFID controlled standalone water dispensing unit. It is very simple to use, and like any usual ATM the customer swipes a prepaid card on the screen and chooses the amount of water one wishes to dispense. The RFID device sends a GPRS message to the SEMS server (Sarvajal Enterprise Management System) which authorizes the transaction instantly. This server keeps a record of the user’s transaction and deducts the amount used on the card. The plant works on a reverse osmosis and UV-based filtration technology. The water is filtered through 5 stages and the quality is in accordance with the international drinking water quality standard, IS 10500. Two patents for this technological innovation has been filed – one for the RFID based remote sensing & quality control and the second for the ATM dispensing system. Sarvajal presently operates in Gujarat, Rajasthan, Madhya Pradesh and Uttar Pradesh.

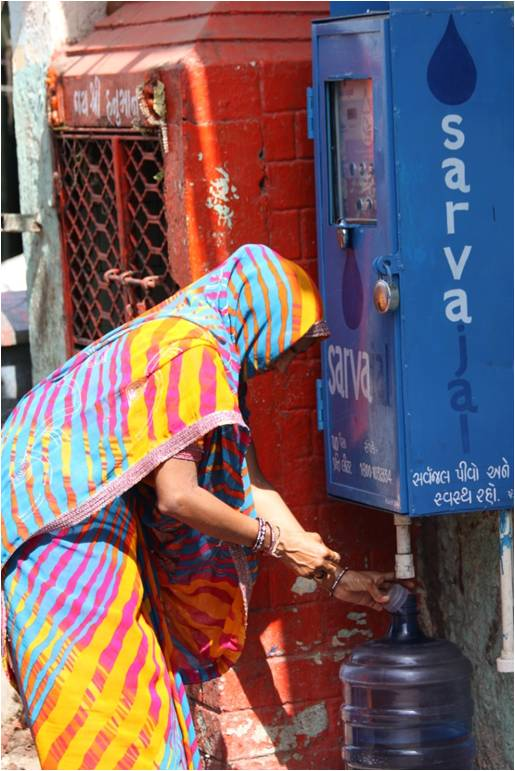
Sarvajal

=== Udgam ===
Source for Change is a rural BPO which provides employment opportunities to rural youth from Bagar, Rajasthan. The call center trains the youth of which 70 percent are rural women through a comprehensive and rigorous training. Over the last four years of its existence, Source for Change has worked with clients such as India's leading education NGO Pratham, India's largest private corporate group (with their Telecom arm), and leading universities in the US in a wide array of services.

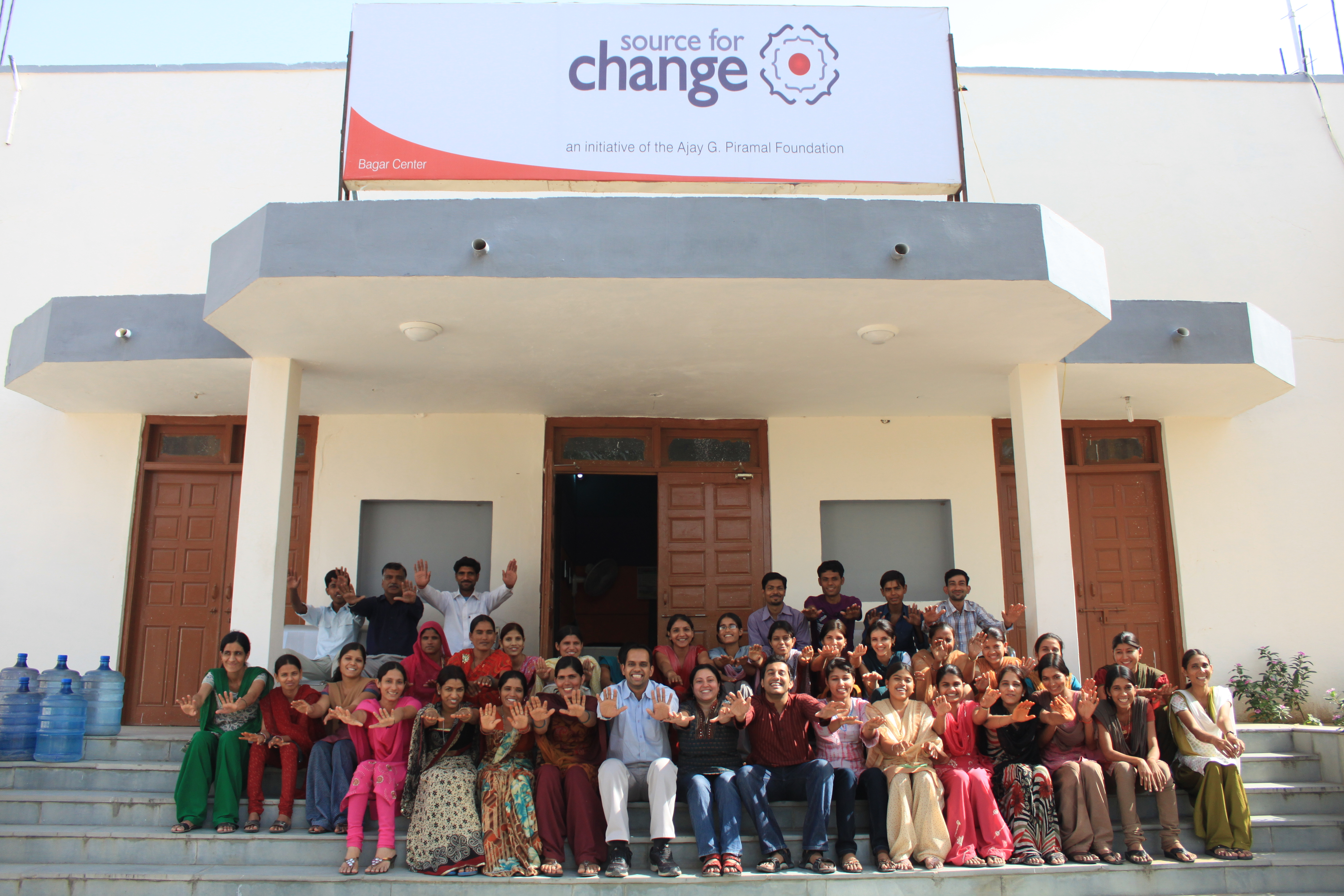
Source for Change

=== Fellowship ===
The Piramal Fellowship is a two-year program run by the Piramal Foundation for Education Leadership. Each year, more than 100 students from Indian colleges and business schools work in remote villages to develop leadership skills. These students are attached to school headmasters and assist in designing and implementing programs intended to improve school performance.

=== Leadership school ===
Piramal School of Leadership (PSL) was inaugurated in December 2013 at Bagar in Jhunjhunu district of Rajasthan. The aim is to build a world class university for education in Rajasthan. The Piramal School of Leadership (PSL) offers a three-year Principal Leadership Development Program for government school headmasters to develop leadership skills and relevant knowledge to impact the quality of education in the schools.

Their vision is to provide a master's degree in innovative new disciplines for the first time in India like Education Leadership, District Education Management, Coaching for School Improvement, Instructional Design, Educational Assessment and Policy Design. This is a 3-year part-time program for Head Masters of schools, with the programme co-created with the foremost management college in India.

== Supported Projects ==
Piramal Foundation is actively supporting the Annamrita initiative of ISKON Food Relief Foundation in providing midday meals to students daily in various cities.

Piramal Foundation promotes Education Leadership through the Piramal School of Leadership (PSL) at Bagar, Jhunjhunu District, Rajasthan. Mr. B.L Joshi, Honourable Governor of Uttar Pradesh inaugurated the school in the presence of Mr. Ajay Piramal – Chairman, Piramal Enterprises, Dr. Swati Piramal – Vice Chairperson, Piramal Enterprises and over 500 headmasters & headmistress.

Piramal Foundation’s primary healthcare initiative, Health Management and Research Institute (HMRI) and Dr. Raman Singh, the Chief Minister of Chhattisgarh inaugurated the 104 Health Information Helpline in Raipur. The 30 seat helpline would operate on 24 x7, throughout the year and would handle a call volume of 2,500 calls a day.
