= Swati Piramal =

Indian scientist and businesswoman (born 1956)

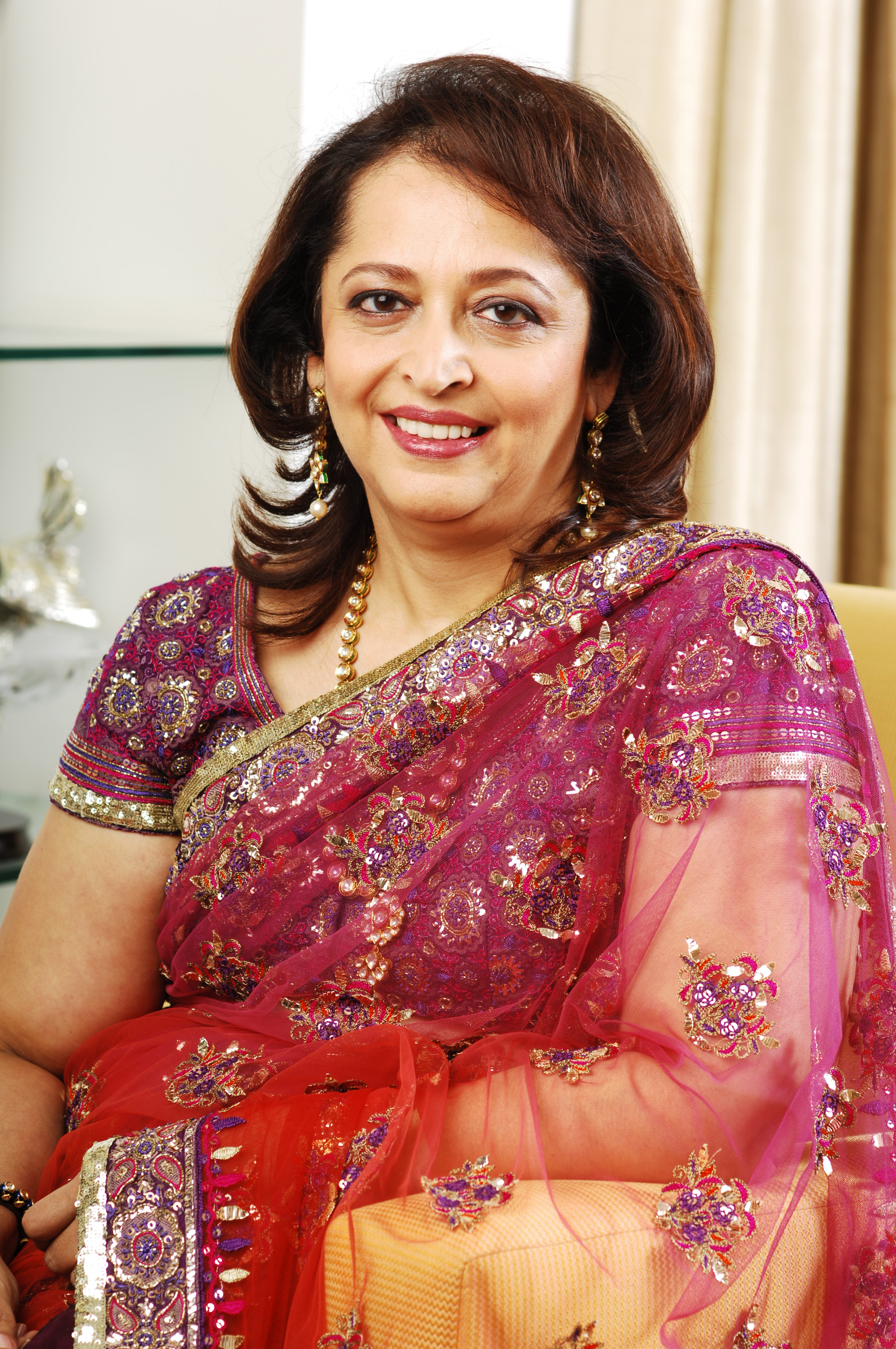
- Born: 28 March 1956 (age 70)
- Education: Mumbai University; Harvard School of Public Health
- Occupation: Vice chairperson of Piramal Enterprises Ltd.
- Spouse: Ajay Piramal
- Children: 2

Swati Ajay Piramal (née Shah; born 28 March 1956) is an Indian scientist and businesswoman, she also involved in healthcare, focusing on public health and innovation. She is the vice chairperson of Piramal Group, a business conglomerate with interests in pharmaceuticals, financial services, real estate and glass packaging.

Piramal has been awarded the Padma Shri, one of India's highest civilian honors, by the President of India in 2012 for her contribution to the science and technology business. She served as the first woman President of India's Apex Chamber of Commerce. She also serves as a member of the Harvard Board of Overseers and Dean's Advisor to Harvard Business School and Public Health.

She completed her schooling from Walsingham House School and St. Xavier's College, Mumbai. She earned her medical degree, an M.B.B.S from Mumbai University in 1980. She is an alumna of the Harvard School of Public Health where she received her master's degree in 1992. She is married to Ajay Piramal, Chairman, Piramal Group.

== Early life ==
Swati Shah was born in Mumbai on 28 March 1956. Piramal showed interest in improving the lives of people diagnosed with chronic illnesses. Therefore, after her high school and college, she pursued a degree in medicine. She undertook a postgraduate course in public health at Harvard University after her marriage and having children.

In the mid-1970s, Piramal came across a girl affected with polio, and she and her medical school friends set up a polio centre. In the first year, they treated 25,000 children. To convince local residents to get their children immunized, Piramal and her friends performed street plays about polio prevention. They also went door-to-door, educating families. They treated children, mostly for free. Ten years later, everyone in the area who needed vaccination or treatment had received it. Having achieved its goal, the centre was closed.

== Personal life ==
Swati Shah Piramal is married to Ajay Piramal and have one son, Anand Piramal who is wedded to Isha Ambani, business magnate Mukesh Ambani and his wife Nita Ambani's only daughter. Ajay and Swati also have one daughter, Nandini Piramal D'Young, who is wedded to an American citizen, Peter D'Young. Shah-Piramal lives in Gulita which is owned and bought by Piramals.

== Career ==
She is the founder of the Gopikrishna Piramal Hospital in Mumbai, and has launched public health campaigns against chronic disease, Osteoporosis, Malaria, Tuberculosis, Epilepsy and polio.

As Director of the Piramal Foundation, she helps promote health in rural India with HMRI – a mobile health service, women's empowerment projects, and supporting community education that creates young leaders. She is a director of Sarvajal foundation for clean water. She has been nominated in the list of the 25 Most Powerful Women, eight times, and is now a part of the Hall of Fame of Most Powerful Women. She serves on the Scientific Advisory Council of the Prime Minister and served on the Council of Trade of the Prime Minister (2010 - 2014).

She currently serves on the Dean's Advisory Board of both the Harvard School of Public Health and the Harvard Business School. She serves on the Boards of Indian and International Academic institutions such as IIT Bombay, and Harvard University.

== Board memberships ==
- Vice-Chairperson, Piramal Group.
- Director, Piramal Foundation.
- Dean's Advisory Board of both the Harvard School of Public Health and the Harvard Business School.
- Non-Executive Director, Nestlé India Limited.
- Served as the first woman president of India's Apex Chamber of Commerce, ASSOCHAM, in 90 years.
- Served on the Scientific Advisory Board of the Prime Minister for 10 years (2006-2014) as well the Council of Trade of the Prime Minister.

== Awards and honours ==
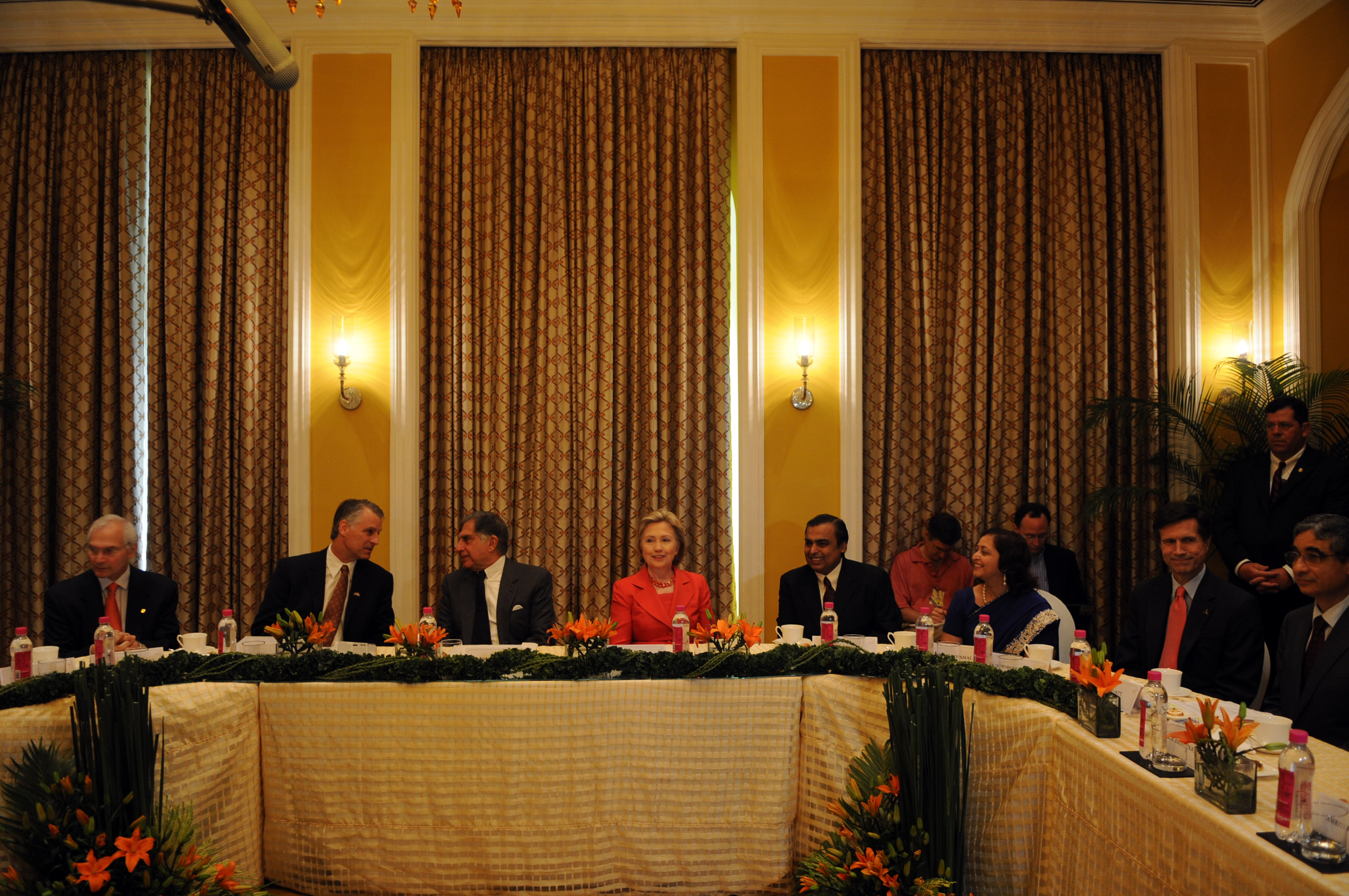
Swati Shah Piramal and several business leaders with Hillary Clinton in Mumbai

Year	Title
2004 2005	BMA Management Woman Achiever of the Year Award
2010 2011	President of ASSOCHAM.
2012	One of India's high civilian honours, the Padma Shri award, by the President of India, Ms. Pratibha Patil (180).
2012	Swati received the Alumni Merit Award, the highest award bestowed on Alumni from Harvard.
2012	Received the Lotus Award at New York, from Children's Hope India, for Leadership and Philanthropy.
2013	Nominated for the Forbes Philanthropy Awards 2013 in the Outstanding Philanthropist category.
2022	Honoured with Chevalier de la Légion d'Honneur (Knight of the Legion of Honour).
