= Piramal Group =

Indian multinational conglomerate

- Type: Private
- Industry: Conglomerate
- Founded: 1984; 42 years ago
- Headquarters: Mumbai, Maharashtra, India
- Area served: Worldwide
- Key people: Ajay Piramal (Chairperson, MD & CEO); Swati Piramal (Vice Chairperson)
- Services: Pharmaceutical; Healthcare; Life sciences; Financial services; Capital; Real estate
- Revenue: ▲₹19,421 crore (US$2.0 billion) (FY25)
- Operating income: ▲₹7,720 crore (US$800 million) (FY25)
- Net income: ▲₹576 crore (US$60 million) (FY25)
- Subsidiaries: Piramal Finance; Piramal Pharma; Piramal Realty; Piramal Foundation
- Website: www.piramal.com

Piramal Group is an Indian multinational conglomerate headquartered in Mumbai, with operations in financial services, pharmaceuticals, and real estate. Ajay Piramal established the group in 1984 through the acquisition of Gujarat Glass Limited; the family had previously been in textiles. In 1988 the group entered healthcare through the purchase of Nicholas Laboratories' Indian operations.

In September 2025, parent company Piramal Enterprises Limited (PEL) completed a reverse merger into its subsidiary, Piramal Finance Limited (formerly Piramal Capital & Housing Finance), which now functions as the group's primary listed financial services arm. The pharmaceutical division was demerged and listed separately as Piramal Pharma Limited in 2022.

Ajay Piramal chairs the wider Piramal Group; his son, Anand Piramal, chairs Piramal Finance following the 2025 merger.

== History ==
=== Textiles to pharmaceuticals (1980–2010) ===
Ajay Piramal took over the group in the early 1980s after the deaths of his father, Gopikishan, and his brother, Ashok. The core business was textiles, run through Morarjee Mills. After the 1982 Great Bombay textile strike, the group began diversifying and eventually sold its textile holdings.

The 1984 acquisition of Gujarat Glass Limited, a maker of glass packaging for pharmaceutical and cosmetic companies, was followed in 1988 by the purchase of Nicholas Laboratories' Indian subsidiary. Further acquisitions followed: Roche Products (India) Ltd in 1993, which included a Vitamin-A manufacturing facility in Thane, and a controlling stake in Ceylon Glass Company Limited of Sri Lanka in 1999. In June 2006, the group's UK subsidiary bought a Pfizer manufacturing plant in Morpeth, England.

By the late 2000s the group had R&D partnerships with Merck and Eli Lilly. In May 2010, the group sold its domestic formulations business to Abbott Laboratories for US$3.72 billion; the same year it sold Piramal Diagnostic Services to Super Religare Laboratories.

=== Lending and analytics (2011–2020) ===
Piramal Healthcare Limited was renamed Piramal Enterprises Limited in 2012, after which the group directed capital into financial services — primarily real estate and corporate lending — and specialty healthcare analytics. Between 2011 and 2014 it held an 11% stake in Vodafone India.

In 2012, PEL acquired Decision Resources Group, a healthcare analytics firm, later integrating the UK-based Abacus International. That year the group also received a European CE mark for its bio-orthopaedic product BST-CarGel. In 2013, the European Medicines Agency's CHMP issued a positive recommendation for the radiopharmaceutical NeuraCeq, and PEL acquired the Caladryl brand in India from Valeant Pharmaceuticals. In December 2020, the group sold its glass packaging business to The Blackstone Group for approximately US$1 billion.

Ajay Piramal has described the group's acquisitions as being evaluated on strategic fit, the underlying fundamentals of the target business, valuation discipline, and organisational culture rather than size or market sentiment alone. He has said the group's investments in Shriram Group companies from 2014, including a period as chairman of the unlisted Shriram Capital, were not pursued as a fuller combination with Piramal's own lending business because of differences between the two organisations' cultures, and that the group chose instead to build a retail lending business within Piramal itself.

=== Listed lender (2021–present) ===
In September 2021, Piramal Capital & Housing Finance acquired Dewan Housing Finance Corporation (DHFL) for ₹34,250 crore, the first resolution of a financial services company under India's Insolvency and Bankruptcy Code. Some fixed-deposit and non-convertible-debenture holders of DHFL objected to the resolution plan's distribution terms and challenged it before the National Company Law Appellate Tribunal. In April 2025, the Supreme Court of India upheld the resolution plan, setting aside the NCLAT order that had partly modified it. In August 2022, the pharmaceutical division was demerged and separately listed as Piramal Pharma Limited.

Reserve Bank of India regulations required "upper-layer" non-banking financial companies to be publicly listed. To comply, Piramal Enterprises reverse-merged into its subsidiary Piramal Finance Limited (the former Piramal Capital & Housing Finance) with effect from 16 September 2025, creating a single listed lending entity; Ajay Piramal continued as chairman of the wider Piramal Group, while his son Anand Piramal became chairman of Piramal Finance and Jairam Sridharan was named its managing director and chief executive.

By March 2026, Piramal Finance's consolidated assets under management crossed ₹1 lakh crore, around 85% of it retail lending, completing the company's multi-year shift from a wholesale to a retail-led lending model. Over the same period, domestic rating agencies ICRA, CRISIL and CARE Ratings upgraded the company's long-term credit rating to AA+, citing the reduction in legacy wholesale exposure and improving profitability. In March 2026, media reports said the company was in talks to acquire IIFL Samasta, the microfinance arm of IIFL Finance; Piramal Finance told the stock exchanges that reports of such discussions were "factually incorrect".

== Group companies ==
The Piramal Group comprises three principal operating companies: Piramal Finance Limited, Piramal Pharma Limited, and Piramal Realty. Piramal Finance and Piramal Pharma are both listed on the Bombay Stock Exchange and the National Stock Exchange of India.

=== Piramal Finance ===
Piramal Finance Limited, formerly Piramal Capital & Housing Finance and, before that, part of Piramal Enterprises Limited, is the group's financial services arm, active in retail lending, housing finance and vehicle financing. Its subsidiaries have included PHL Fininvest, and the company has held minority stakes in Shriram Group companies.

In 2021, the company acquired the bankrupt Dewan Housing Finance Corporation and merged it with Piramal Capital & Housing Finance. Its retail finance division provides lending on behalf of partner fintech companies including Moneyview, EarlySalary, Navi Group and KreditBee, and vehicle financing for partners such as CARS24, CarDekho and Spinny. Apart from retail finance, it is also engaged in corporate lending and real estate finance.

Since 2016, Piramal Enterprises and Bain Capital Credit have operated a partnership called India Resurgence Fund (IndiaRF), an investment fund for financially distressed Indian companies. A partnership with CDPQ launched in 2020, Piramal Capital Fund, provides corporate financing services. Both funds are managed by Piramal Alternatives, an asset management company set up in 2021.

Following the September 2025 reverse merger of Piramal Enterprises into Piramal Capital & Housing Finance, the combined entity took the Piramal Finance name and began trading on the NSE and BSE under the ticker PIRAMALFIN.

=== Piramal Pharma ===
Piramal Pharma Limited is active in pharmaceuticals, healthcare and life sciences. Its business divisions include Piramal Pharma Solutions, a contract development and manufacturing organization; Piramal Critical Care, a manufacturer of inhalational anesthetics and other hospital generics; and a consumer healthcare products division. Piramal Pharma was demerged from Piramal Enterprises and separately listed in 2022.

Piramal Pharma's subsidiaries include Hemmo Pharmaceuticals and Convergence Chemicals. It also has a joint venture with Allergan in the ophthalmology products segment.

=== Piramal Realty ===
Piramal Realty is a wholly owned real estate venture of the Piramal Group, founded in 2012, developing residential and commercial properties in the Mumbai Metropolitan Region including Piramal Aranya, Piramal Mahalaxmi, Piramal Revanta and Piramal Vaikunth. In July 2015, private equity firm Warburg Pincus invested approximately US$284 million for a minority stake in Piramal Realty, followed a month later by a ₹900 crore investment from Goldman Sachs. The group also developed the Crossroads shopping mall in South Mumbai, one of India's early large-format malls.

== Piramal Foundation ==
The Piramal Foundation is a private philanthropic foundation established in 2006. Its initiatives include Piramal Swasthya, a rural healthcare programme; Sarvajal, which provides drinking water through solar-powered water dispensers; Source for Change, a rural business process outsourcing operation staffed by women in Bagar, Rajasthan; a partnership with the education non-profit Pratham; and school-leadership training through the Piramal Fellowship and Principal Leadership Development Programme.

== See also ==
- Piramal Glass
