= Ajay Piramal =

Indian businessman (born 1955)

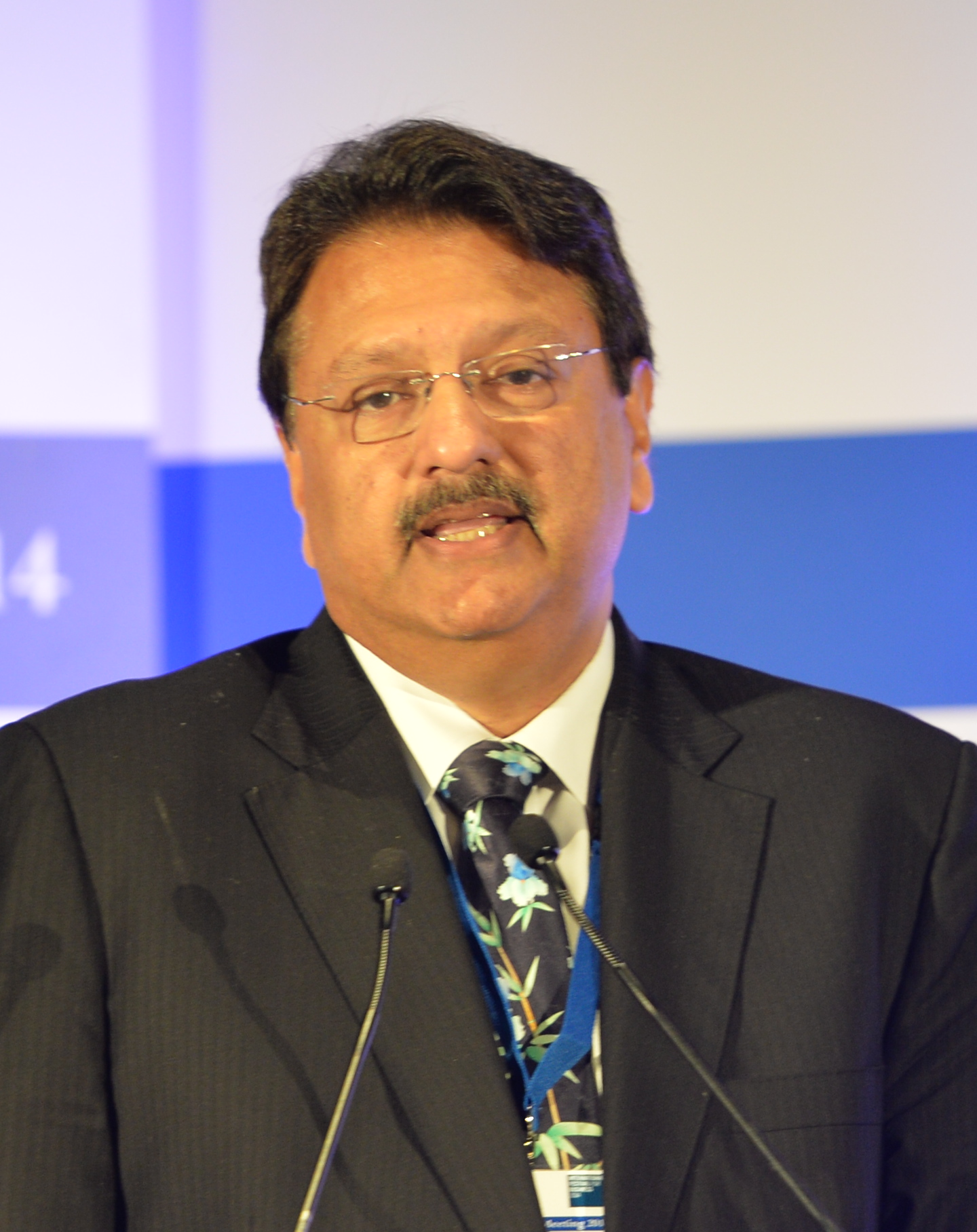
- Piramal in 2014
- Born: 3 August 1955 (age 71); Rajasthan, India
- Education: Jamnalal Bajaj Institute of Management Studies; Jai Hind College
- Occupation: Businessman
- Title: Chairman of Piramal Group
- Spouse: Swati Shah Piramal
- Children: 2

Ajay Gopikisan Piramal (born 3 August 1955) is an Indian billionaire businessman, and the chairman of the Piramal Group, a conglomerate with interests in pharmaceutical, financial services, real estate, healthcare analytics and glass packaging. As of September 2026, his net worth is estimated at US$4.3 billion.

== Early life ==
Ajay Piramal was born to Gopikisan Piramal and Lalita Piramal in Rajasthan, India on 3 August 1955. In 1977, at age 22, Piramal started out in his family's textile business, founded in 1934 by his grandfather Piramal Chatrabhuj. His father, Gopikisan Piramal, died in 1979, and after five years he lost an older brother to cancer, prompting him to take over the business.

Piramal holds a bachelor's degree in Science from the Jai Hind College and Basantsingh Institute of Science, University of Mumbai (then Bombay), a master's degree in management studies from Jamnalal Bajaj Institute of Management Studies, University of Mumbai, and in 1992 attended the six-week Advanced Management Programme at Harvard Business School. Piramal has received an honorary doctorate by Amity University, India and Honorary Doctor of Science from IIT Indore.

== Business career ==
In 1988, Piramal bought Nicholas Laboratories, an Australian multinational corporation. The company is now ranked fifth among pharma companies in India, having made a string of overseas acquisitions like the Indian subsidiaries of Roche, Boehringer Mannheim, Rhone Poulenc, ICI and Hoechst Research Centre. India's first major shopping mall, Crossroads, was developed from three redundant Piramal factory buildings in Mumbai.

He led Piramal Enterprises Ltd invested in Vodafone India by buying 11% in two tranches. The first 5.5%, was bought in 2011 for Rs 2,856 crore and the second, the next year for Rs 3,007 crore to buy a 5.5% stake in Vodafone India for INR 30.07 billion ($618 million), taking the total stake to 11%. In April 2014, Piramal Enterprises Ltd. sold its 11% stake for INR 8,900 crore, at a 51.78% premium to the price the company had paid in 2011–12.

After selling his stake in Vodafone India, Piramal paid INR 2,014 crore to buy a 20% stake in Shriram Capital Ltd., an arm of the Chennai-based Shriram Group. The purchase was made in addition to INR 1,636 crore investment in Shriram Transport Finance Co. Ltd. for a 9.9% stake. Piramal also serves as the Chairman of Shriram Group.

Piramal announced in 2019 he planned to resign as chairman of Shriram Capital Ltd. He was named chairman five years earlier.

== Directorships and board memberships ==
- Chairman, Piramal Group
- Non-Executive Director, Tata Sons Ltd
- Member, Board of Dean's Advisors, Harvard Business School
- Board of Advisors, India's International Movement to Unite Nations
- President and Chairman of the Governing Body, Anant National University
- Chairman, Pratham Education Foundation
- Member of National Council of Confederation of the Indian Industry (CII)
- Co-Chair, UK-India CEO Forum
- Member of the Honorable Prime Minister's Council for Trade & Industry and the Board of Trade constituted by the Ministry of Commerce
- Member of the Honorable Prime Minister's Task Force on Pharmaceuticals and Knowledge-Based Industries
- Member, Central Board of State Bank of India
- Invitee to the World Economic Forum for the last 20 years

=== Former positions ===
- Former Chairman, Indian Institute of Technology, Indore
- Member, Central board of directors of State Bank of India.

== Awards and honours ==
- Honorary Commander of the Order of the British Empire (CBE) in 2022 for services to the UK-India trade relationship.
- Business Leader of the Year Award, 2018, International Advertising Association Leadership Awards
- Special Achievement Award, Asia Pacific Entrepreneurship Awards (APEA) 2018
- CNBC Asia's India Business Leader of the Year Award, 2018
- CNBC Asia Business Leader of the Year Award, 2017
- SEN Sustainability Award – Philanthropy and Best of Best – instituted by World Presidents' Organisation (2015)
- Outstanding Philanthropist 2013 and 2014, Forbes Philanthropy Awards
- Kriyasheel Global Achievers Award (2010)
- India Innovator of the Year 2008 awarded by CNBC TV 18
- Entrepreneur of the Year' Award of UK Trade and Investment Council in 2006
- Ernst & Young's Entrepreneur of the Year Award in the Healthcare and Life Sciences category in 2004
- "Business Leader Award" in Pharma Sector at the CHEMTECH PHARMABIO AWARD (2004);
- "Life Time Achievement Award" by The Rotary Club of Mumbai Mid-Town (2004)
- Global Leader of Tomorrow by the World Economic Forum (2004)
- Rotary International (District 3140) Certificate of Appreciation and "Four Way Test Award" in 2001
- CEO of the Year Award' by World Strategy Forum (1999)

== Philanthropy ==
Piramal finances the Piramal Foundation. The foundation is quoted as taking about 10–15% of his time. The Piramal Foundation is the philanthropic arm of the Piramal Group.

The Piramal Foundation has initiatives across Health, Education and Safe Drinking Water, namely Piramal Swasthya, Piramal Foundation for Education Leadership and Piramal Sarvajal, respectively. The Foundation works across 21 states in India, mostly in partnership with state governments.

Piramal is among the Advisory Committee Members of Annamrita, ISKCON Food Relief Foundation (IFRF) that serves 1.2 million meals through its 20 kitchens across India every day.

== Personal life ==
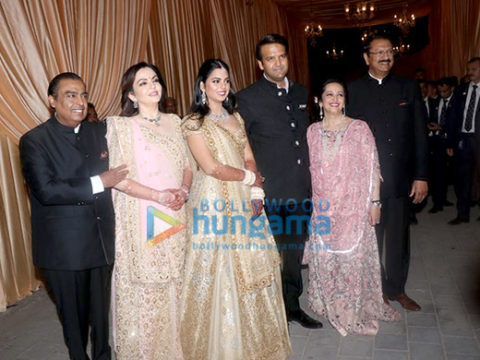
The Ambani and Piramal family at the wedding reception of Isha Ambani-Anand Piramal which was situated in Reliance Jio Garden.

Ajay Piramal is married to Swati Shah Piramal. They are the parents of two children. Their daughter, Nandini Piramal D'Young, married US citizen Peter D'Young in 2009. Piramal's son, Anand Piramal, married Isha Ambani Piramal (née Ambani), daughter of billionaire businessman Mukesh Dhirubhai Ambani and his wife Nita Dalal Ambani, on 12 December 2018.

The family considers Radhanath Swami their family-guru.

=== Gulita ===
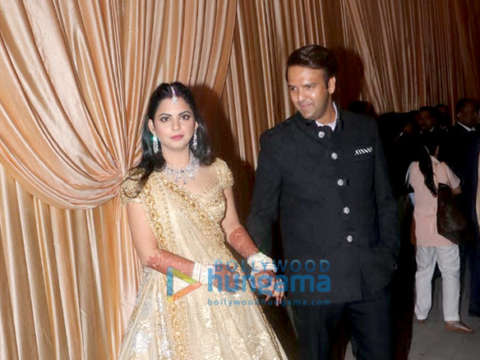
Ajay and Swati Piramal had gifted Gulita to the newlyweds, Isha Ambani Piramal and Anand Piramal.

Anand Piramal's parents Ajay and Swati Piramal gave them their home Gulita as a wedding gift. It occupies 50,000 square feet of floor space in Worli, Mumbai, with three basements, multiple dining rooms, an outdoor swimming pool, a garden, a hall and a diamond-themed bungalow with a diamond room and a temple room. Estimated to be worth $100 million in 2022, Gulita was bought through an auction by Piramal from Hindustan Unilever for $61.2 million in 2012. Ajay Piramal and his family started the remodeling work for the house in 2015. Following the completion of the renovation work, the Brihanmumbai Municipal Corporation (BMC) gave an occupancy certificate to the property in September 2018. The interior is designed like Antilia, the residence of Isha Ambani before marriage.
