= Sydenham College of Commerce and Economics =

College in Mumbai, India

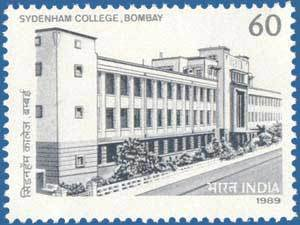
- Commemorative stamp of Sydenham College on its 75th Anniversary 1988
- Motto: Labor Omnia Vincit (Latin); Samudyogo hi vishvajita (Sanskrit)
- Motto in English: Work conquers all Diligent Efforts Conquer the World
- Type: Public research university
- Established: 1913; 113 years ago
- Academic affiliations: Dr. Homi Bhabha State University
- Principal: Dr. Rupesh R. Raut (I/C)
- Location: Mumbai, Maharashtra, India
- Website: www.sydenham.ac.in

Sydenham College of Commerce and Economics is a college located in Mumbai, Maharashtra, India. It is affiliated to the Dr. Homi Bhabha State University. The college offers undergraduate and postgraduate degrees in management. It was awarded a re-accreditation 'A' grade and 3.42 GPA in the second cycle assessment conducted by the National Assessment and Accreditation Council.

== History ==
Sydenham College was established in October 1913. It was named after the then-governor of Bombay, Lord Sydenham of Combe. K. S. Aiyar acted as the first honorary principal of the college. The economist Percy Anstey was appointed Principal in 1914, a position he held until his death in 1920.

Sydenham was the first college to offer Commerce education in Asia. It was only in 1941, twenty-eight years after the establishment of Sydenham College, that any other institute started offering courses in the subject.

On the college's seventy-fifth anniversary in 1988, the Indian Post Office issued a commemorative stamp.

In the year 2019, Sydenham college was de-affiliated from Mumbai University and affiliated to Dr. Homi Bhabha State University.

== Societies and Clubs ==
Sydenham College of Commerce and Economics has a variety of student-run societies and clubs spanning cultural, literary, academic, professional, and social domains. These forums are primarily student-managed and contribute to the college's tradition of extra-curricular excellence, leadership development, and community service.

=== Student's Council ===
The apex student body coordinates major college events, represents student interests, and oversees various committees, including the organization of "Brouhaha" (annual intercollegiate festival) now renamed to "The Rainbow Lane".

=== Dramatics Society (DS) ===
Encourages theatre through the organization and performance of plays and dramatic arts activities.

=== Marathi Wangmaya Mandal (MWM) ===
Celebrates Marathi language, literature, and culture through various forums and creative writing events.

=== Nature Club (NC) ===
Registered under the World Wildlife Fund (India), the Nature Club organizes nature trails, environmental campaigns, eco-initiatives, and raises ecological awareness among students.

=== Performing Arts Society (PAS) ===
Supports students in dance, music, and allied performing arts, nurturing talent and creating opportunities for stage exposure.

=== Public Speaking and Debating Society (PSDS) ===
Facilitates debates, extempore, quizzes, and literary competitions to enhance students' oratory and analytical skills.

=== Social Service League (SSL/NSS) ===
Coordinates community service, health drives, and social awareness programs in affiliation with the National Service Scheme.

=== Sydenham College Co-operative Stores ===
Student-run co-operative that supports the college community through retail, computer, and publicity divisions.

=== BMS Society ===
A dedicated platform for Bachelor of Management Studies students, organizing academic and professional skills activities.

=== Rotaract Club ===
The Rotaract Club of Sydenham College (RCSC) is affiliated with Rotary International (District 3141) and Sponsored by Rotary Club of Bombay. It empowers students through volunteer service, leadership opportunities, International Fellowship and community engagement. Notable activities include the "Ambiente" the Annual clean up trek,“Let’s Eco brick” sustainability project and a range of social initiatives.

=== Entrepreneurship Cell (E-Cell) ===
E-Cell encourages innovation, business skills, and entrepreneurship among students by organizing workshops, seminars, business plan competitions, and sessions with industry leaders.

=== Alumni Cell and Other Clubs ===
Active alumni engagement is fostered through the Alumni Cell. Additional societies—such as Sports Club and other discipline-based forums—contribute to the college’s holistic ethos.

== Student of the Year ==
The Student of the Year award at Sydenham College of Commerce and Economics is one of the institution's most prestigious honors, recognising all-round excellence, leadership, and outstanding contributions by students. Each academic year, the college confers this award separately upon one male and one female student from the Junior College and Senior College, celebrating exceptional achievements in academics, co-curricular activities, and social responsibility.

=== Criteria and Selection ===
Recipients of the Student of the Year award are selected based on:

Academic Excellence: Consistently high academic performance and top results in university and college examinations.

Co-curricular Involvement: Meaningful participation and achievements in clubs, societies, and festivals.

Leadership and Service: Demonstrated leadership within the college community or broader society, including both organizational roles and voluntary service.

Conduct and Integrity: Exemplary conduct, discipline, and a positive influence on peers and campus culture.

The selection process involves self nominations by students, assessment by a dedicated committee, and review of students’ portfolios and achievements.

=== Annual Recognition ===
The award is presented during the college’s annual awards ceremony, attended by faculty, students, families, and distinguished alumni. Awardees receive a certificate, medal, and formal recognition in college publications and the annual magazine.

== Location ==
- 1913: The college was run from the Elphinstone College premises in Fort.
- 1914–1922: The college moved to the Whiteway Laidlaw Building on Hornby Road, near the present-day Handloom House in Fort.
- 1922–1955: The college was on the premises of the present-day Sir J. J. College of Architecture in Fort, opposite the Victoria Terminus railway station. It was then known as the Indo-British Institute.
- 1955 onward: In 1955, Sydenham College moved to its current location on "B Road" at Churchgate, very near the terminus of the Western Railway section of the Mumbai suburban railway. It is close to the Marine Drive sea front on the Arabian Sea.

== Courses offered ==
Government aided courses

- Higher Secondary Certificate - Commerce
- Bachelor of Commerce (since 1913)
- Master of Commerce (since 1925)

Self financed courses

- Bachelor of Management Studies
- Bachelor of Commerce (Banking and Insurance) (since 2003)
- NSE Certified Market Professional Course
- Vocational Course in Foreign Trade

== Notable alumni ==
Indian jurist and intellectual B. R. Ambedkar was a lecturer at the college. Yasmin Surveyor was the first woman Commerce graduate in Asia in the year 1925 from Sydenham College.

Business

- Akbar Al Baker, CEO of Qatar Airways
- Ashwin Choksi entrepreneur, non-executive chairman of Asian Paints
- Pramod Agarwal, Indian-British businessman and founder of Zamin Ferrous group
- Keki Mistry, vice-chairman and CEO of HDFC
- Deepak Parekh, chairman, HDFC
- Girish Paranjpe, joint CEO, Wipro
- Krish Iyer, president and CEO, Walmart India
- Kumar Mangalam Birla
- Dilip Piramal, chairman, VIP Industries
- Harsh Mariwala, founder and chairman, Marico
- Nimesh Kampani, chairman, JM Financial.
- Niranjan Hiranandani, entrepreneur, co-founder and MD of Hiranandani Group
- Smita Jatia, vice-chairperson, Westlife Foodworld Limited
- Pramit Jhaveri, CEO, Citi India
- Rakesh Jhunjhunwala, investor and trader
- Ronnie Screwvala, chairman, UTV Motion Pictures
- Sanjiv Mehta, owner, East India Company London
- Uday Kotak, chairman Kotak Mahindra Bank
- Ashok Vaswani, MD and CEO-designate of Kotak Mahindra Bank
- Yogesh Mahansaria, founder and CEO of multinational, Alliance Tire Group
- Bhavin Turakhia, founder of Flock, Ringo, Radix and Zeta.
- Falguni Nayar, founder and CEO of Nykaa

Education

- Gita Johar, Meyer Feldberg Professor of Business, Columbia Business School
- Jagdish Bhagwati, economist and Professor of Economics at Columbia University
- Ashok V. Desai, Indian economist

Film, theatre and television

- Aditya Chopra, director and producer
- Atul Agnihotri, actor and director
- Emraan Hashmi, actor
- Fazila Allana, notable TV producer, founder and MD of Sol Production Pvt. Ltd.
- Gayatri Joshi, Indian actress, known for her role in Hindi film Swades (2004)
- Hrithik Roshan, actor
- Juhi Chawla, actress and Femina Miss India Universe 1984
- Karanvir Bohra, television actor
- Lymaraina D'Souza, Indian model and Femina Miss India Universe 1998
- Rahul Bose, actor
- Uday Chopra, actor
- Milan Luthria, director
- Sameera Reddy, Indian film actress
- Sanaya Irani, television actress
- Sanjay Gupta, film director
- Shamita Shetty, Indian film actress
- Sheetal Mallar, Indian supermodel
- Shiamak Davar, dancer and singer
- Suchitra Krishnamoorthi, Indian pop singer and actress
- Swapnil Joshi, TV actor-comedian
- Vinod Khanna, actor
- Zeenat Aman, Indian film actress
- Rajit Kapur, actor

Politics and government

- Meera Sanyal, politician, formerly, country head of ABN AMRO and RBS
- Ajit Gupte, ambassador of India to Germany
- Milind Deora, politician
- Omar Abdullah, politician
- Praful Patel, politician
- Vinod Khanna, politician and film actor
- Rais Shaikh, politician
- Julio Riberio, IPS

Others

- Dinesh D'Souza, political commentator
- Vijay Merchant, cricketer
- Jawahar Bakshi, Gujarati poet
- Bhupen Khakhar, leading artist in Indian contemporary art

== See also ==
- H.R. College of Commerce and Economics
- Kishinchand Chellaram College
- Mithibai College
- Jai Hind College
- Narsee Monjee College of Commerce and Economics
