= Yogesh =

Male given name

- Gender: Male

Origin
- Origin: India/Nepal

Other names
- Related names: Yougesh/Yogi/Yogisha/Yogita

Yogesh is an Indian masculine given name. The Sanskrit word yogeśa is a compound of the words yoga and īśa and has the meaning "master of yoga" and has also been used as an epithet of Shiva.

== Notable people ==
- Yogesh (actor)
- Yogesh (lyricist) (born 1943), Indian writer and lyricist
- Yogesh Atal (1937–2018), Indian sociologist
- Yogesh Chander Deveshwar (born 1947), Indian businessman
- Yogesh Gholap, Indian politician of Maharashtra
- Yogesh Golwalkar (born 1980), Indian cricket player
- Yogesh Jaluria, scientist
- Yogesh Joshi, several people
- Yogesh Kumar Joshi (born 1962), Indian soldier
- Yogesh Kumar Sabharwal (1942–2015), Indian judge
- Yogesh Kumar Sanan (born 1964), Indian bodybuilder
- Yogesh Mahansaria, Indian entrepreneur
- Yogesh Mittal (born 1976), Indian film director
- Yogesh Nagar (born 1990), Indian cricket player
- Yogesh Patil (born 1972), Indian politician from Maharashtra
- Yogesh Pratap Singh (born 1959), Indian lawyer and activist
- Yogesh Praveen (1938–2021), Indian author
- Yogesh Rawat (born 1992), Indian cricket player
- Yogesh Sagar, Indian politician of Maharashtra
- Yogesh Samsi (born 1968), Indian tabla player
- Yogesh Takawale (born 1984), Indian cricket player
- Yogesh Tilekar, Indian politician

== See also ==
- Yogeshwar, a related name
