= Harsh Mariwala =

Indian entrepreneur

- Born: Mumbai, Maharashtra, India
- Education: Sydenham College of Commerce and Economics, Mumbai
- Occupations: Chairman, Marico and Founder, ASCENT Foundation
- Years active: 1971 – present
- Organization: ASCENT Foundation
- Known for: Founder of Marico
- Spouse: Archana
- Children: 2

Harsh Mariwala is an Indian entrepreneur, who is the founder and Chairman of Marico, a Fortune India 500 company from Gujarat.

Mariwala began his career in 1971 with Bombay Oil Industries which was controlled by his family. After working with his family business with his cousins and family from an office located in Masjid Bunder in Mumbai, he decided to create the Company Marico with the support of his Brothers in Family Business Distribution in other subsidiary businesses. In 1990, he founded Marico, a fast moving consumer goods (FMCG) manufacturer and distributor that now has operations in 25 countries across Asia and Africa.

He is also the founder of Kaya Limited, which runs a chain of skin care clinics across India and the Middle East; ASCENT Foundation a non-profit peer to peer learning entrepreneurial platform to exchange insights, experiences and ideas in a confidential environment.; Marico Innovation Foundation, that works towards nurturing innovations in India; Mariwala Health Initiative, that supports mental health causes; and Sharp Ventures, which serves as his family office.

As of 2021, Mariwala has been ranked by Forbes as the 55th wealthiest Indian, with an estimated net worth of approximately $2.8 billion.

As per Forbes list of India’s 100 richest tycoons, dated October 9, 2024, Harsh Mariwala & family are ranked 43rd with a net worth of $6.9 Billion.

== Family and early life ==
Mariwala's grandfather, Vallabhdas Vasanji migrated to Mumbai (then Bombay) from Kutch in 1862. Vasanji became known as "Mariwala" as he was dealing in pepper, which is known as mari in Gujarati. Mariwala's father Charandas founded Bombay Oil Industries Limited in 1948 along with three of his brothers which manufactured and traded in spices, oils and chemicals.

Mariwala was brought up in South Mumbai educated at Sydenham College in Mumbai and joined the family enterprise in 1971. He started the consumer products business of the company in 1975 and took its two major brands, Parachute coconut oil and Saffola refined oil to the next level. Innovations such as smaller packaging and use of plastic bottles in place of metal tins along with focus on advertising, marketing, human resources, and distribution helped establish the two brands as market leaders in their respective categories.

== Marico ==
At Bombay Oil Mills, Mariwala had limited autonomy as management responsibilities were shared amongst the family members. Moreover, he saw the firm as a business to business venture more than the business to consumer venture he envisaged. Therefore, he decided to start Marico as a separate entity. Mariwala initially found it difficult to recruit talented employees given that their office was then located in the crowded market area of Masjid Bunder, hence he held interviews at the Willingdon Sports Club and later moved the Marico office to a more accessible area, Bandra. Along with focus on innovation and investing in brand building, Mariwala focused on establishing a company culture to empower employees and values such as trust to establish it as a force to reckon with.

In the late 1990s Marico made its first serious entry into markets outside India by setting up a manufacturing plant in Bangladesh. Thereafter, the company has set up or acquired other consumer brands businesses in several countries. The company has built a portfolio of brands in the hair care, skin care, edible oils, health foods, male grooming, and fabric care space. Its major brands include Saffola, Parachute, Hair & Care, Nihar, Livon, Set Wet, Mediker and Revive.

Harsh Mariwala took Marico public with an initial public offering in 1996. In India, Marico bought the hair care brand Nihar from Hindustan Unilever in 2006 and personal care brands Set Wet, Livon and Zatak from Reckitt Benckiser in 2016.

In 2003, Mariwala spotted an opportunity in the skin care clinics space and founded Kaya Clinic as a subsidiary of Marico. In 2013, when Kaya was demerged from Marico and listed on stock exchanges as a separate entity it had 107 skincare clinics out of which 82 were located in India and had a range of 54 skin care products in its portfolio.

In 2014, Mariwala decided to step down as Managing Director whilst continuing to serve as Chairman. Mariwala brought in professional leadership to replace him in the company and his focus since has been on strategic direction and board management at Marico.

== Social responsibility ==
Mariwala founded the Marico Innovation Foundation (MIF) in 2003 which is the Corporate Social Responsibility (CSR) arm of Marico. It aims to uplift start-ups through mentoring and providing them an ecosystem of research, knowledge creation and dissemination. MIF hosts the MIF Awards, a biennial event where innovations across Indian business industry and social causes are picked by a jury. In 2014, Mariwala founded the Mariwala Health Initiative (MHI) and is focused on supporting mental health issues.

In 2012, he set up ASCENT Foundation as a peer learning platform for entrepreneurs to exchange insights, experiences and ideas in a confidential environment. As of 2024, ASCENT has over 1000 member entrepreneurs. The annual revenue of ASCENT members crosses Rs.1,00,000 crore. The vision for ASCENT is to build a widespread ecosystem across cities that significantly impacts and nurtures 10,000 leaders on their journey to success.

== Awards ==
- 2009: 2009: Ernst & Young 'Entrepreneur of the Year' Award.
- 2020: Ernst & Young World ‘Entrepreneur of the Year’ Award.
- 2022: AIMA Life Time Achievement Award.

== Investments ==
Mariwala has set up a family office, Sharrp Ventures, which is headed by his son Rishabh. The venture invests in listed and unlisted companies. As of 2017, it had invested in eight unlisted equities, five funds and one incubator at the seed, Series A or Series B stage.

== Personal life ==
Harsh Mariwala is married to Archana and they have two children. His son Rishabh runs his venture Soap Opera n More, manages the family office Sharrp Ventures and is a non-executive director at Marico.

Mariwala is a committed vegetarian by birth and is also a fitness enthusiast. He works out at gymnasium daily and plays golf on weekends. He is also known to be fond of playing squash, swimming, and trekking.

In April 2026, Almighty Motion Picture announced a film and television adaptation of Mariwala's 2023 book Harsh Realities: The Making of Marico, with screenwriter Karan Vyas—known for the Indian television series Scam 1992—attached to the project. In the same month, his tenure as Non-Executive Independent Director of Zensar Technologies Limited concluded on April 17, 2026.
