= Signature Island =

Indian luxury development project

- Location within Mumbai

General information
- Status: Completed
- Type: Residential
- Location: Bandra Kurla Complex, Mumbai, India
- Coordinates: 19.0666°N 72.8670°E
- Construction started: 2009
- Completed: 2015

Technical details
- Floor count: 18

Design and construction
- Architects: Talati & Panthaky Associated (TPA)
- Main contractor: Sunteck Realty, Shapoorji & Pallonji Limited

Signature Island is a luxury development project in the Bandra Kurla Complex, Mumbai, India. Built by Sunteck Realty Limited, the project features all duplex homes of 7,500 and 11,500 square feet. The project was completed in 2015.

In 2013, Signature Island was named Project of the year at the 27th National Real Estate Awards. In 2014 it won 2 awards at the Realty Plus Excellence Awards. In 2015 it was named Luxury Project of the Year by Lokmat.

== Notable residents ==
- Aishwarya Rai Bachchan and Abhishek Bachchan
- Sonam K Ahuja
- Rinke Khanna
- Vikram Pandit
- Nimesh Kampani
- Uday Kotak
