= The Institute of Science, Mumbai =

Institution of postgraduate education and research in Mumbai, India

Coordinates: 19°08′01.09″N 72°54′55.29″E

The Institute of Science
- Former name: Royal Institute of Science
- Motto: It is good to seek out the causes of things
- Type: Research Institution
- Established: 1920; 106 years ago
- Academic affiliations: Dr. Homi Bhabha State University
- Director: Shrinivas B. Kulkarni
- Faculty: 50
- Location: Mumbai, Maharashtra, India
- Campus: Urban
- Website: iscm.ac.in

The Institute of Science (formerly known as the Royal Institute of Science (RIS)) is an institution of postgraduate education and research located in Mumbai, India. It is managed by the Government of Maharashtra and is clustered from 2019 batch with the Dr. Homi Bhabha State University.

It is accredited with an 'A' Grade by the National Assessment and Accreditation Council (NAAC) in March 2014.

== History ==
=== Construction ===
Royal Institute of Science was founded by George Clarke, 1st Baron Sydenham of Combe.

The foundation stone for the institute was laid in 1911. The building was designed by George Wittet. The building is built using yellow Kharodi basalt stone from the district of Thane. It has a curved shape with two wings joined by a flat central dome. The building features arched facade and includes a botanical garden, herbarium and a park.

The building was completed in 1920 and is arounded bo other 19th century buildings such as Rajabai tower of University of Mumbai, the Elphinstone College.

The institute's buildings were constructed using funds from private donations. Sir Cowasji Jehangir donated money for the institute's east wing. The construction of the west flank of the main building was paid for by Jacob Sassoon, and the east flank by Sir Currimbhoy Ebrahim, Bt. Sir Vasanji Mulji donated funds for the library. Central dom of the building is named Cowasji Jehangir Hall.

=== Education ===
Its research centers around all branches of science including Physics, Chemistry, Biology, Microbiology, Mathematics, Biochemistry, Bio-Technology and Environmental studies. In Maharashtra state and University of Mumbai, some programs like the Masters in biochemistry, were available only in the Institute of Science until recently.

== Academics ==
It offers M.Sc. and Ph.D. programs and currently does not offer undergraduate programs. Till 2018, the institute was affiliated to the University of Mumbai. Since 2019, it is main constituent college of Dr. Homi Bhabha State University.

The Institute of Science was awarded the status of "College with potential for Excellence" by the UGC in 2009 and awarded generous grants for infrastructure development.

== Notable alumni ==
The institute enjoys a wide variety of notable alumni. These persons played a crucial role in the development of their respective fields;

- Homi J. Bhabha - father of Indian nuclear programme; Founding Director of TIFR & 1st Chairman of AECI
- V. V. Narlikar - Indian Physicist
- B. M. Udgaonkar - Indian Physicist
- M. G. K. Menon - Indian Physicist & 2nd Chairman of ISRO
- Shreeram Abhyankar - Indian-born American Mathematician
- Madhav Gadgil - Indian Ecologist
- Madhav Chavan - Indian Social Activist & Educator (Pratham)
- K. H Gharda - Indian chemical Engineer
- K. J. Somaiya - Indian Industrialist & Educator (Somaiya Trust)
- Kiran Karnik - former CEO of NASSCOM
- Varsha Gaikwad - Indian politician
- Kamala Sohonie - Indian biochemist
