= Kotak Mahindra Asset Management Company =

Indian financial services firm

Kotak Mahindra Asset Management Company Limited
- Type: Public
- Industry: Investment management
- Founded: 2 August 1994
- Headquarters: Mumbai, Maharashtra, India
- Key people: Uday Kotak (Chairman and Non-Executive Director); Nilesh Shah (Managing Director)
- Products: Asset management, Wealth management, Alternative investments
- AUM: ₹5,66,981.82 crore (December, 2025)
- Owner: Kotak Mahindra Bank (100%)
- Website: www.kotakmf.com

Kotak Mahindra Asset Management Company Limited (KMAMC) is an Indian financial services firm and a wholly owned subsidiary of Kotak Mahindra Bank. Established in 1998 and headquartered in Mumbai, it serves as the investment manager for the Kotak Mahindra Mutual Fund. As of March 2026, it is the fifth largest asset management company in India by assets under management.

== History ==
KMAMC was incorporated on 2 August 1994 and formally commenced operations in December 1998. It launched its initial mutual fund schemes focused on government securities. Over the following two decades, the company expanded its retail presence to over 96 cities in India.

In the early 2020s, the firm diversified its portfolio to include international real estate investment trusts (REITs) and private credit. In 2025, it entered the alternative investment fund (AIF) sector with the launch of a private credit vehicle targeting emerging corporates.

== Operations and services ==
The company serves as the investment manager for the Kotak Mahindra Mutual Fund. Its assets are distributed across equity, debt, hybrid, and index-based instruments. Two of the largest equity schemes by assets under management are the Kotak Flexicap Fund and the Kotak Emerging Equity Fund.

The firm manages discretionary and non-discretionary portfolio management services (PMS) for institutional and high-net-worth clients. It also operates Alternative Investment Funds (AIF), registered with the SEBI, which include the Kotak India Renaissance Fund and various private credit vehicles.

Through its subsidiary, Kotak Mahindra Pension Fund Limited, the group is one of the designated pension fund managers under the National Pension System (NPS). This subsidiary manages retirement assets for both government and private sector subscribers under the oversight of the Pension Fund Regulatory and Development Authority (PFRDA).

== Recognition ==
In 2020, the firm received the Refinitive Lipper Fund Award India in mutual fund categories.

In 2023, The Financial Express listed the company among the ten largest mutual fund AMCs in India.

In 2025, The Economic Times included KMAMC among the top ten equity PMS performers in India.

In June 2025, Forbes India featured the company in its list of the ten largest asset management companies in India by assets under management.

== See also ==
- Mutual funds in India
- Kotak Mahindra Bank
