= Choksi =

Choksi is a Gujarati surname. Notable people with the surname include:

- Ashwin Choksi (1944–2018), Indian entrepreneur
- Mehul Choksi (born 1959), Indian businessman
- Mukul Choksi (born 1959), Gujarati poet
