= Arvind Mediratta =

Indian business executive

- Born: 1967 (age 58–59)
- Education: B.Tech, MBA
- Alma mater: Indian Institute of Management, Calcutta, Indian Institute of Technology, Delhi
- Occupations: MD & CEO, Hippo Homes
- Spouse: Rashmi Mediratta
- Children: 2
- Website: www.arvindmediratta.com

Arvind Mediratta (born 1967) is an Indian business executive, and the managing director and chief executive officer at Hippo Homes, a Dalmia Bharat Group company, since July 2023. He was previously the managing director and chief executive officer at METRO Cash & Carry, the Indian arm of German wholesaler Metro AG, from February 2016 to July 2023.

== Education ==
Mediratta received a B.Tech in Chemical Engineering from Indian Institute of Technology, Delhi in 1989. He did his MBA in Marketing and Finance from Indian Institute of Management, Calcutta in 1991, and was conferred with the Roll of Honour at the institute. In 2002, he was a part of the General Management Program of the University of Michigan - Stephen M. Ross School of Business.

== Career ==
Mediratta began his career with Procter & Gamble (P&G) in 1991 to handle marketing and branding strategy in India, Bangkok, and Singapore for a decade. He was the chief marketing officer at Marico in 2001 and Whirlpool (India) in 2003. As the chief marketing officer for South Asia for Yum! Brands in 2005, he handled Taco Bell, Pizza Hut, KFC, and A&W in India, Bangladesh, Sri Lanka, and Mauritius.

Mediratta joined Walmart (India) in 2007 and set up Walmart's Cash and Carry business; later, he was elevated as its chief operating officer and handled its India operations. He joined Walmart (USA) as the global officer and vice-president for operations (Texas) for the entire US market, followed by being the global officer and vice-president of merchandising for Fresh until 2016.

Mediratta joined Metro Cash and Carry, India as its chief executive officer and managing director in 2016, leading its expansion into new geographies, transformation into a customer-centric enterprise, and making it a profitable billion dollar company.

He was the Chair of Federation of Indian Chambers of Commerce and Industry (FICCI) Committee on Retail and Internal Trade from 2020-2022. He was also the Co-Chair of Food Processing Committee, Confederation of Indian Industry (CII) in 2019.

== Recognition ==
- Top 8 Marketers in India – The Economic Times (2003)
- 50 most Powerful People in Media, Advertising and Marketing in India – PITCH (2004)
- 25 Hottest Young Executives in India – Business Today (2006)
- Most Promising Business Leaders of Asia – The Economic Times (2020)
- Inspiring CEOs of 2021 – The Economic Times (2021)
- Food and Grocery Retail Icons of India, 2022 – Images Group
- Business Icons of India 2022 – Marksmen (2022)
- Most Inspiring CEO – The Economic Times (2022)
- Most Promising Business Leaders of Asia 2022–23 – The Economic Times

== Personal life ==
Mediratta is married to Rashmi Mediratta, an art enthusiast, and has two children. He is also the Chairperson, Retail and Internal Trade Committee, FICCI
