= Hill Grange High School =

Location
- 13 A Peddar Road, Cumballa Hill, Mumbai 400026; India; 18°58′19″N 72°48′37″E View Map

Information
- Type: Private
- Motto: Work is Worship
- Established: 1939
- Founder: Madame Sophy Kelly
- Closed: 2003
- Principal: Sophy Kelly, Reuben Kelly
- Staff: 35
- Faculty: 50
- Grades: Prep-10th, Junior College
- Enrollment: 800
- Sports: Soccer, basketball, swimming, athletics, cricket
- Affiliation: ISC, ICSE, SSC, SSLC, Junior College
- Website: http://www.facebook.com/#!/groups/5867586597/

Hill Grange High School was a private school for boys and girls located on Pedder Road, Mumbai, Maharashtra, India.

== History ==
It was founded in 1939 by Madame Sophy Kelly, a prominent member of the Indian Jewish community. She was a well known personality and was referred to as the queen of Peddar Road. She contributed towards the educational ministry of Maharashtra, and was the school's principal for most of its history. The school closed in 2003.

== Early timeline ==
- 1939 — Founding and establishment of the Hill Grange Nursery and Kindergarten School
- 1942 — The establishment of the Hill Grange primary section.
- 1943 — The establishment of the lower secondary of the school.
- 1956 — Final and complete establishment of the two sections of the Hill Grange High School
  - Senior Cambridge
  - Secondary School Certificate

== Notable alumni ==
- Business:
  - Mukesh Ambani — Billionaire, Chairman and Managing Director of the Indian conglomerate Reliance Industries
  - Anand Jain — Billionaire, Chairman of Jai Corp Limited
  - Pramod Agarwal— Indian British businessman and founder of Zamin Ferrous

  - Anil Ambani — Billionaire, Chairman and Managing Director of Reliance Anil Dhirubhai Ambani Group
- Entertainment:
  - Rajesh Khanna — Actor, producer
  - Prem Krishen — Actor, producer
  - Shailender Singh — Singer, actor
  - Neetu Singh — Actress
  - Varsha Bhosle — Singer, journalist
  - Vishal Dadlani — Indian Music Director, Singer
  - Nazneen — Actress
  - Himesh Reshammiya — Indian Music Director, Singer, Actor, Television Producer, Lyricist, Film Producer, Script Writer, and Distributor
- Literature:
  - Ashok K. Banker - Author, Screenwriter, Celebrity.
- Others:
  - Sanjiv Bhatt — Indian Police Service
