= Ashok Desai (disambiguation) =

Ashok Desai is an Indian lawyer.

Ashok Desai may also refer to:

- Ashok V. Desai (born 1936), Indian economist
- Ashok Desai (judge) (1942–2006), Indian judge
