= Kamala Sohonie =

Indian biochemist (1911–1998)

- Born: 18 June 1911; Indore, Indore State, British India (now part of Madhya Pradesh, India)
- Died: 28 June 1998 (aged 87); New Delhi, India
- Education: University of Mumbai; Indian Institute of Science; Newnham College; University of Cambridge
- Known for: Being the first Indian female to earn a PhD
- Spouse: M. V. Sohonie
- Scientific career
- Fields: Biochemistry

Kamala Sohonie (18 June 1911 – 28 June 1998) was an Indian biochemist who in 1939 became the first Indian woman to receive a PhD in a scientific discipline. Her acceptance into and work at the Indian Institute of Science, Bengaluru, paved the way for women to be accepted into the institution for the first time in its history.

Her research delved into the effects of vitamins and into the nutritive values of pulses, paddy, and groups of food items consumed by some of the poorest sections of the Indian population. Her work on the nutritional benefits of the palm extract called 'Neera' was inspired by the then-president Rajendra Prasad's suggestion. Kamala Sohonie received the Rashtrapati Award for this work.

== Early life ==
Kamala Sohonie (née Bhagvat) was born on 18 June 1911 in Indore, now in Madhya Pradesh, India. Her father, Narayanarao Bhagvat, as well as her uncle, Madhavrao Bhagvat, were chemists and alumni of the erstwhile Tata Institute of Sciences (which later became the Indian Institute of Science) in Bengaluru. Kamala followed 'family tradition' and graduated in 1933 with a BSc degree in Chemistry (principal) and Physics (subsidiary) from Mumbai University.

Kamala then applied to the Indian Institute of Science for a research fellowship, but her application was turned down by the then-Director and Nobel Laureate Prof. C V Raman on the grounds that women were not considered competent enough to pursue research. Kamala responded to the rejection by holding a 'satyagraha' outside Prof. C V .Raman's office, which persuaded him to grant her admission, but with some stipulations:

- She would not be admitted as a regular student.
- She would be on probation for the entire first year.
- Her work would not be officially recognized until CV Raman was himself satisfied with its quality.
- She would not spoil the environment by being a "distraction" to her male colleagues.

Although admittedly humiliated by them, Kamala agreed to the terms, thus becoming in 1933 the first woman to be admitted into the institute. She would later say, "Though Raman was a great scientist, he was very narrow-minded. I can never forget the way he treated me just because I was a woman. Even then, Raman didn't admit me as a regular student. This was a great insult to me. The bias against women was so bad at that time. What can one expect if even a Nobel Laureate behaves in such a way?". Also after a year, many women got their admission to the institution.

== Career and research ==
Kamala's mentor at the IISc was Sri Srinivasayya. During her stint here, she worked on proteins in milk, pulses and legumes (a subject that was especially significant in the Indian context). Her dedication and research mettle influenced Prof. Raman's decision to let women into the IISc a year after she completed her MSc degree with distinction in 1936.

She was then invited to UK's Cambridge University to work under Dr. Derek Richter in the Frederick G. Hopkins laboratory. She was a student of Newnham College, matriculating in 1937 and studying the Biological Natural Sciences Tripos. When Richter left, she worked under Dr. Robin Hill and studied plant tissues. From her work on potatoes, she discovered the enzyme Cytochrome c which plays an essential role in the electron transport chain (the process by which energy is created for organisms), found in plants, human and animal cells. Her thesis on the subject was completed in 14 months and was 40 pages long, a departure from the usually much longer PhD submissions.

After receiving her PhD, Kamala returned to India in 1939. As a supporter of Mahatma Gandhi, she wanted to come back to her country and contribute to the nationalist struggle. She was appointed Professor and Head of the Department of Biochemistry at Lady Hardinge Medical College in New Delhi. Later, she worked at the Nutrition Research Laboratory, Coonoor as Assistant Director, focusing on the effects of vitamins.

She married M.V Sohonie, an actuary, in 1947 and moved to Mumbai. She joined the Royal Institute of Science as a Professor in the Department of Biochemistry, and worked on the nutritional aspects of legumes. Her eventual appointment to the position of Director of the Institute is believed to have been delayed by 4 years due to existing gender bias in the scientific community. During this period, Kamala and her students conducted important research on three groups of food items that are majorly consumed by financially disadvantaged sections of people in India. Sohonie also studied the nutritional properties of pulses and legumes, including factors that affected their protein digestibility. Her research examined the nutritional value of commonly consumed foods in India, particularly those important to lower-income communities.

Kamala started work on 'Neera' (sap extracted from the inflorescence of various species of toddy palms) on the suggestion of then-President of India, Rajendra Prasad. She found significant quantities of Vitamin A, Vitamin C, and iron in the drink, and that these elements can survive concentration of Neera into palm jaggery and molasses.

Later studies indicated that the inclusion of Neera in the diets of malnourished adolescent children and pregnant women from tribal communities as an inexpensive dietary supplement led to significant improvement in health. She was awarded the Rashtrapati Award for her work in this subject.

== Death and legacy ==
Kamala was an active member of the Consumer Guidance Society of India (CGSI). She was elected President of the CGSI for the 1982–83 period and she also authored articles on consumer safety for the organisational magazine called 'Keemat'.

Kamala Sohonie died in 1998, shortly after collapsing during a felicitation ceremony organised by Indian Council of Medical Research (ICMR) in New Delhi.

On 18 June 2023, search engine Google commemorated Sohonie with a Doodle on her 112th birth anniversary.
