= Nimesh Kampani =

Indian investment banker (born 1946)

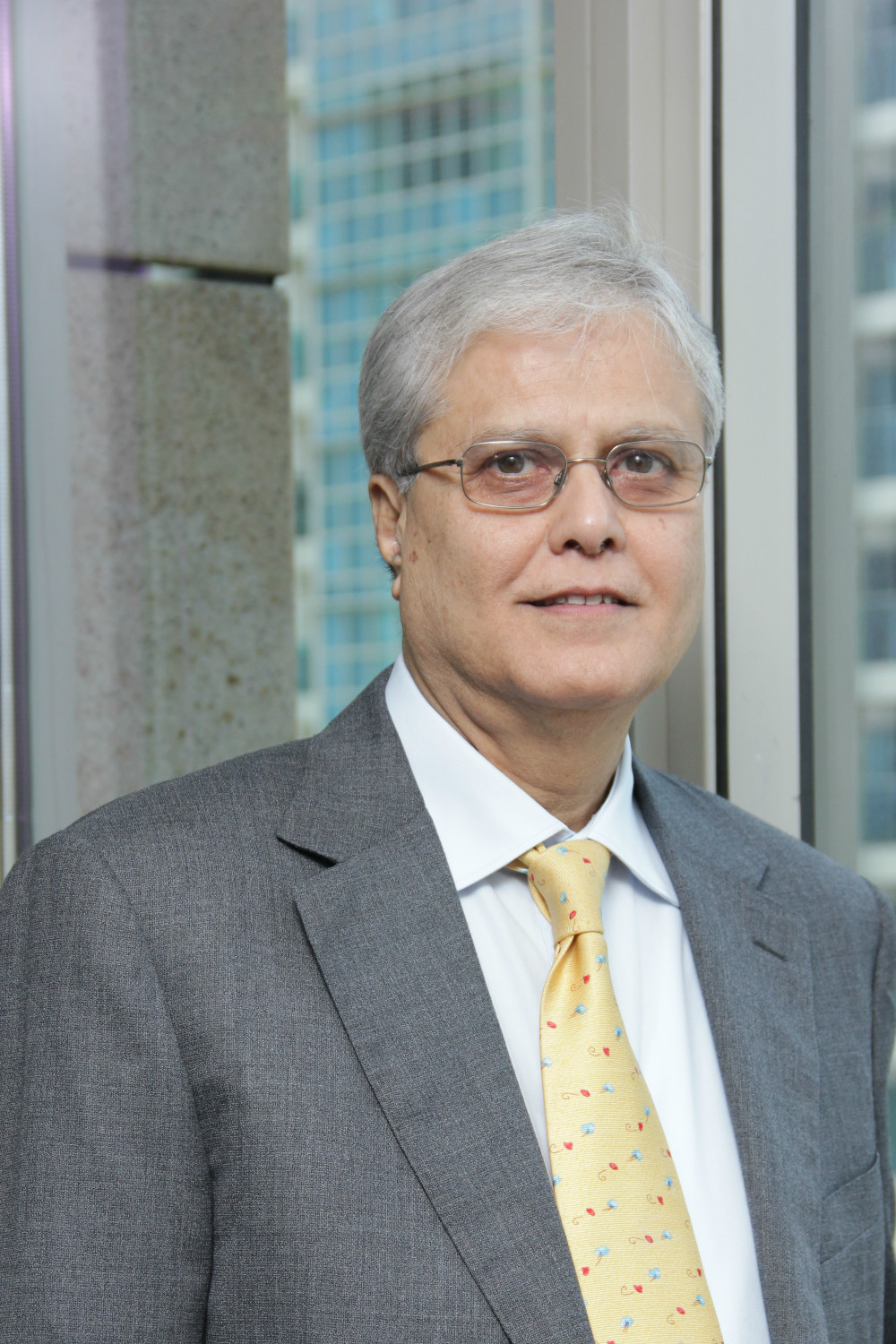
- Kampani at his JM Financial Office
- Born: 30 September 1946 (age 79); Mumbai, India
- Education: Sydenham College of Commerce and Economics, Chartered Accountant from ICAI
- Occupations: Investment banker; financier
- Children: 1

Nimesh Kampani (born 30 September 1946) is an Indian billionaire investment banker and financier. He is the chairman of the JM Financial group of companies. His personal wealth was valued at US$1.1 billion as of June 2025 making him the 83rd richest in India, at that time. The Kampani family's combined direct and indirect equity ownership of JM Financial Ltd is between 60% and 65%. Livemint called him along with Hemendra Kothari and Uday Kotak the "Three K's" of India's leaders in investment banking.

In 2014, the court named him as the mediator in the inheritance dispute between Shardul and Cyril Shroff over the law firm Amarchand Mangaldas, which at the time was India's largest.

== Early life and education ==
Kampani is a commerce graduate from Sydenham College of Commerce and Economics and is a Chartered Accountant CA from ICAI.

== Career ==
Kampani co-founded and led JM Financial, an investment bank founded in 1973, which in the course of his career he made into one of India's largest. Kampani co-founded JM Financial with his cousin, Mahendra Kampani. In his career, he played a key role in taking Tata Consultancy Services and Bharti Airtel public, assisted the Indian government in raising $2.4 billion through the partial sale of the Oil and Natural Gas Corporation. Kampani also advised Mukesh Ambani on the demerger of Reliance Industries following the split with his brother Anil Ambani, and later negotiated the deal between Diageo and Vijay Mallya. Kampani facilitated major business alliances, including a telecommunications partnership involving Ratan Tata, Kumar Mangalam Birla, and AT&T.

In 2016, Kampani stepped down as the managing director (MD) of JM Financial, with his son Vishal succeeding him as MD and Kampani continuing as non-executive chairman.

== Controversy ==
In 2009, Nimesh Kampani was reported to be hiding in Dubai since December 2008 to avoid arrest in India for payment default by a Hyderabad company called Nagarjuna Finance, where he had been an independent director on the board of directors until 1999, for approximately 100 crores. In April 2009, the Supreme Court of India granted a stay on Kampani's arrest on the charges of allegedly defrauding depositors of Nagarjuna Finance. Kampani returned to India in October 2009.

== Personal life ==
Kampani has two children.
