= Krish Iyer =

- Education: Chartered Accountant
- Alma mater: Institute of Chartered Accountants of India
- Occupation: Independent Director of Procter & Gamble Hygiene & Healthcare Limited

Krish Iyer was the president and CEO of Walmart in India. Walmart is the world's largest retailer.

== Early life ==
Iyer was born in Mumbai, India and holds a bachelor's degree(Hons) in Commerce and Economics from Sydenham College Mumbai. Iyer is a Chartered Accountant from Institute of Chartered Accountants of India.

Iyer previously worked at A.S. Watson Group where he was Managing Director - Thailand & Philippines R&D. Prior to that, Iyer was Head of Retail and later CEO at Pyramid Retail.

In March 2020, Walmart India announced that Iyer will be moving to an advisory role by April 2020 as his contract with the company is set to expire. Sameer Aggarwal has been elevated as head of Walmart's India operations to replace Iyer.

== Walmart ==
Iyer joined Walmart in 2012 as a Senior Vice President.
