= Pramod Agarwal =

Indian businessman

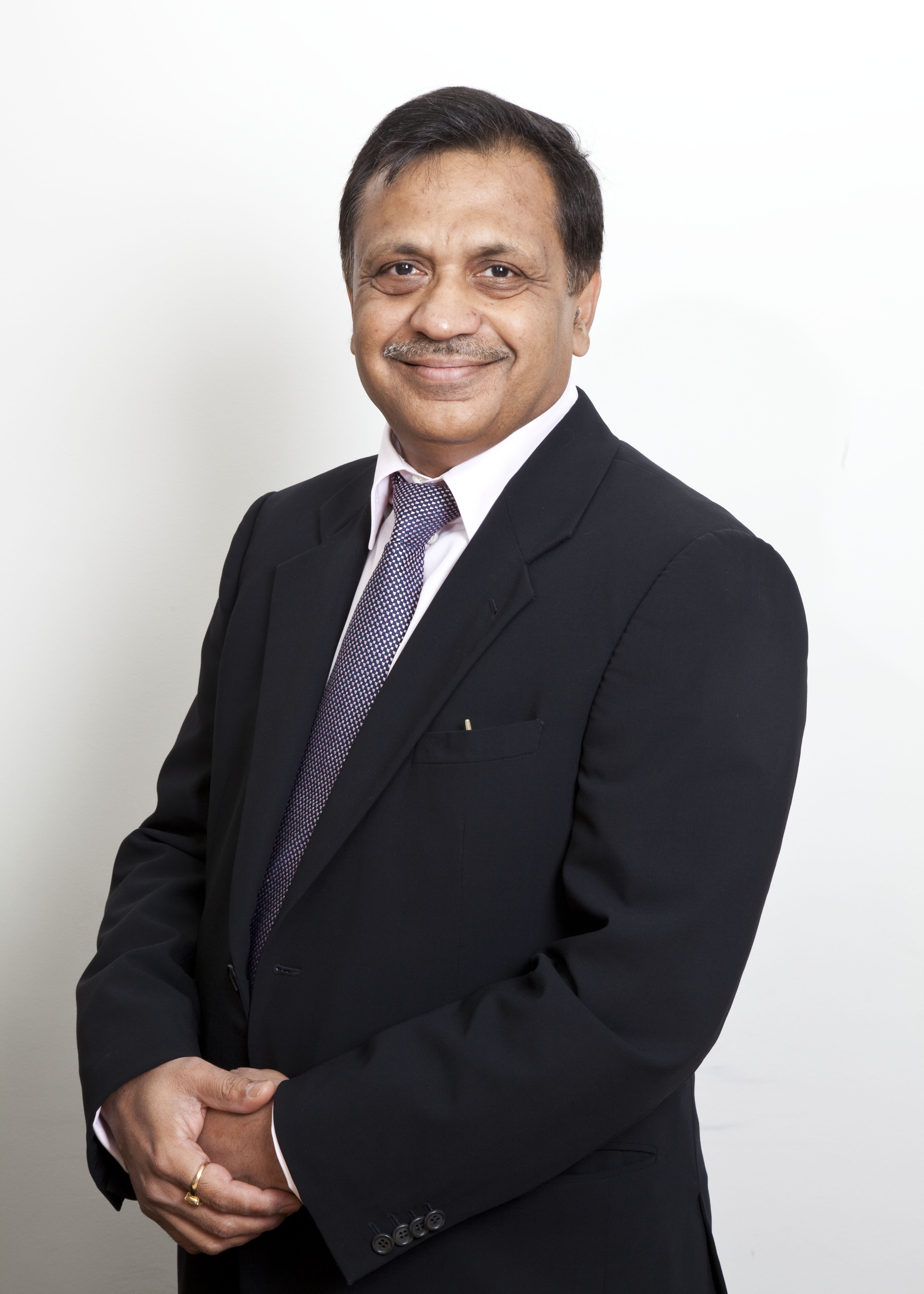
- Born: September 1954 (age 72); Bombay, India
- Education: Hill Grange High School (B.Com) Sydenham College of Commerce and Economics; Mumbai University
- Occupation: Businessman
- Known for: Founder, Zamin Ferrous
- Spouse: Vijaya Agarwal
- Children: 2

Pramod Agarwal (born September 1954) is a British Indian businessman who founded Zamin Ferrous in 2004, an international mining group that supplies direct reduction and blast furnace iron ore pellet fines to the global steel industry.

== Early life ==
Agarwal was born in Bombay in September 1954. His family originates in a small municipality near Bhiwani, in Haryana State in northern India.

He began schooling in Hill Grange High School and went on to graduate with a bachelor’s degree in commerce from Sydenham College of Commerce and Economics, Mumbai. He then quickly began to build his business portfolio. At age 17, he began working for his family's firm; and at 22, left India for Hong Kong, where he began Texuna International Ltd (1981), which was involved in the textile and cotton trades.

Agarwal diversified into fertilizers, steel, and other commodities. He invested in the ‘opening-up’ of former Soviet Union markets in the late 1980s and early 1990s, making several investments in Uzbekistan, Tajikistan, Kazakhstan, Turkmenistan and Russia, including a high-profile partnership with Tvoi Dom, a large Russian retail and department store.

== Career ==
After over 30 years in the global commodities business, Agarwal founded Zamin Group in 2004, an international mining group that supplies direct reduction and blast furnace iron ore pellet fines to the global steel industry.

With Zamin group, Agarwal invested heavily in South American economies. In 2013 the Bamin iron ore project in the Brazilian state of Bahia was sold to the Eurasian Natural Resources Corporation (ENRC) for over US$1 Billion. Agarwal described Zamin Group's growing influence in Brazil as “a significant milestone for Zamin in its ambition to become a global player in iron ore mining.”

Zamin is suing Eurasian Natural Resources Corporation for $220 million, and is being counter-sued for $115 million, resulting from their joint venture in the Bamin iron-ore project in Bahia, Brazil, dating back to 2010. This dispute "promises to be one of the most unusual and juicy cases seen in the capital for some time", as there are "allegations of improper conduct by federal and state courts in foreign jurisdictions."

In 2007, Zamin group purchased the mining rights to a large area in central Uruguay with a potential yield of over 5 billion tonnes of iron ore. This project, which came to be known as 'Valentines', reflects Zamin's business strategy “to partner with regional and national governments to develop assets and clearly defined infrastructure and logistics solutions.” Valentines was set to generate $1.4 billion in exports annually for a period of 20 years. The $3bn site has 2.5 billion tonnes of indicated and inferred iron ore deposits and is the biggest project in Uruguay's history. However, a change in Uruguay's mining laws has delayed its development.

== Personal life ==
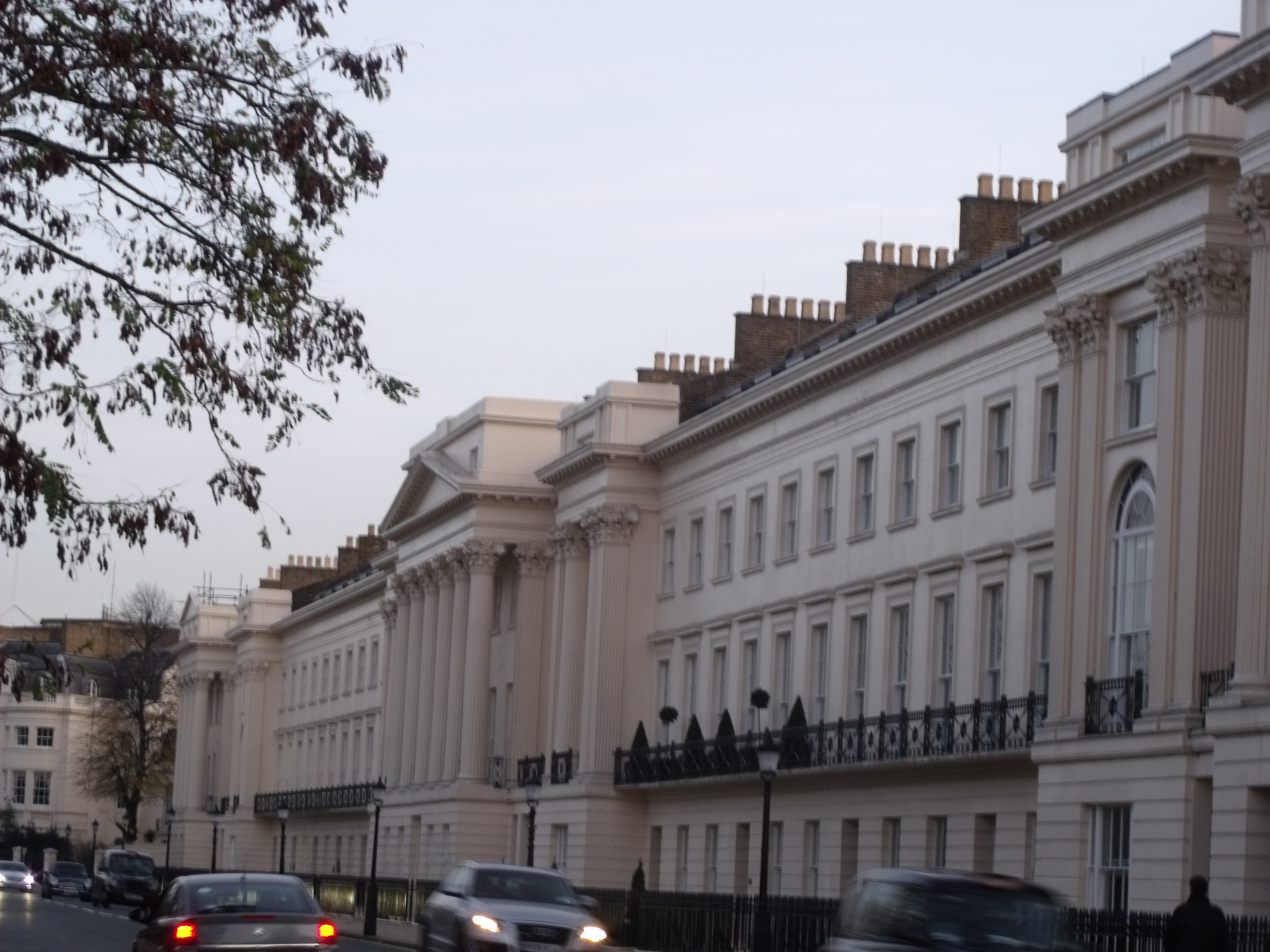
Cornwall Terrace, Regent's Park, London

Agarwal is the father of two daughters. Vinita was married to Muqit Teja in 2012, the wedding being held at the San Clemente Palace, Venice, with celebrations designed by the Italian Cirque du Soleil theatre director Franco Dragone, starring the pop singer Shakira. The 2015 wedding of Ritika and Rohan Mehta, son of the Indian tycoon Yogesh Mehta, was held in Apulia. The 800 guests were sung to by the pop group Florence and the Machine and the Bollywood actor, Pritam.

Despite the wedding making headlines, Agarwal himself does not lead an extravagant lifestyle. In an interview with the Hindustan times he asserted that the majority of his time is taken up by work and "I am happiest doing that. I don't fancy luxury cars though I have them, neither am I a movie buff. I love gardening and that is one of my hobbies.” A vegetarian who doesn't consume alcohol, his favourite musicians include the new-age musician Jeff Clarkson.

In October 2013, Agarwal purchased 9, Cornwall Terrace, overlooking London's Regent's Park, from the developer Christian Candy, using a Guernsey-registered shell company aptly named "9 Cornwall Terrace Ltd." He paid £37.5 million for the terraced mansion, taking a £29 million mortgage from Royal Bank of Canada. As of April 2016, it is for sale with Savills for £32 million. Agarwal now lives at his nine-bedroom "country" house with four acres of grounds in Mill Hill, north London.
