= Vishal Dadlani =

Indian singer, songwriter and music composer

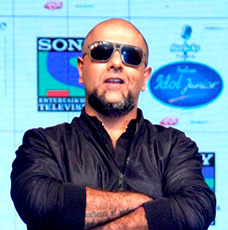
- Dadlani at the Indian Idol Junior, in 2015
- Born: 28 June 1973 (age 53); Mumbai, Maharashtra, India
- Education: Hill Grange High School
- Alma mater: Jai Hind College; H.R. College
- Occupations: Music composer; film score composer; playback singer; lyricist; screenwriter; television personality
- Years active: 1994–present
- Spouse: Priyali (m. 1999; div. 2017)

Vishal Dadlani (born 28 June 1973) is an Indian singer, songwriter, and music composer. He is best known for being one half of the musical duo Vishal–Shekhar and the lead vocalist of rock band Pentagram.

Dadlani has also maintained a successful solo career and has collaborated with many international artists like Imogen Heap, Diplo, the Vamps, and Akon.

== Early life ==
Dadlani was born and raised in a Sindhi Hindu family in the Bandra neighbourhood of Bombay, Maharashtra. He went to Hill Grange High School in the Cumbala Hill neighbourhood of South Bombay, and subsequently attended the Jai Hind College of the University of Mumbai for two years (1989–90), after which he went to H.R. College of Commerce and Economics, both in Churchgate. He graduated in 1994 with a bachelor's degree in commerce.

== Career ==
Dadlani's musical journey started in 1994 with the Mumbai-based electronica/indie-rock band Pentagram, which he fronted. Pentagram has gained recognition as one of the pioneers of Indian independent music.

While active with the band, he found fame as a Bollywood music composer, singer, and lyricist, working on soundtracks of movies like Jhankaar Beats (2003), Bluffmaster! (2005), and Salaam Namaste (2005).

=== Collaboration with Shekhar ===
In 1999, Vishal–Shekhar, the Bollywood composing/producing and performing music duo, was formed. Dadlani and Shekhar Ravjiani have worked together on Hindi, Telugu, Tamil, and Marathi films. Their notable works include Jhankaar Beats (2003), Dus (2005), Bluffmaster (2005), I See You (2006), Om Shanti Om (2007), Bachna Ae Haseeno (2008), Dostana (2008), Anjaana Anjaani (2010), Ra.One (2011), Student of the Year (2012), Chennai Express (2013), Bang Bang! (2014), Happy New Year (2014), Sultan (2016), and Befikre (2016). The duo has gained nationwide recognition, and today are credited with being amongst the architects of the modern Bollywood sound, having composed music for over 60 films, released over 300 songs, and performed over 1,000 shows worldwide. The two rose to prominence in 2003 when they wrote the score for the film, Jhankaar Beats, which included the song "Tu Aashiqui Hai". They won the Filmfare RD Burman Award for New Music Talent for their work on the film.

== Controversies ==
In the aftermath of the Panama Paper leaks, the names of Dadlani and some of his family members surfaced due to investments they made through his company Sunny Blessing Holding Inc. in the British Virgin Islands. Some of these transactions are currently under investigation by the Enforcement Directorate.

In 2016, he received strong opposition for criticizing the Jain monk Muni Tarun Sagar in a tweet. He was accused of hurting religious sentiments and several First information reports were filed against him, though the monk is said to not have taken the issue seriously. Dadlani later wrote an open letter, saying that the tweets had been his biggest mistake. He was reprimanded and fined by the Punjab and Haryana High Court for the tweet.

In 2024, Dadlani again faced criticism following his reaction to an incident at Chandigarh Airport, where actress Kangana Ranaut was assaulted by a Central Industrial Security Force (CISF) constable. Dadlani publicly praised the constable and offered her a job. Subsequently, singer Sona Mohapatra criticized Dadlani in response to a tweet that referred to him as a "rare gem of Bollywood" for his actions. Mohapatra questioned his integrity, citing his association with Anu Malik, who had been accused of sexual harassment by multiple women in 2018.

In 2026, Dadlani again faced criticism over his tweets following his meeting with Safina Khan (journalist and vlogger) and an alleged ISI member. Some tweets of him trended on Twitter slamming him as he said to Richard Dawkins, "You're wrong. ISIS is geo-politically motivated. 'ISLAM' is what they are using to cover-up Western involvement."

== Playback singing ==
Dadlani got his first break as a playback singer for other music directors when Shankar–Ehsaan–Loy approached him to sing "Kiss Of Love", for the movie Jhoom Barabar Jhoom (2007). His first released track was "Dhoom Again" for Dhoom 2 (2006) by music director Pritam, as suggested by Aditya Chopra.

=== Selected contributions ===
- Ikka (2026)
- Tu Meri Main Tera Main Tera Tu Meri (2025)
- Shyam Singha Roy (2021)
- DNA mein Dance (2020)
- Kareeb (2021)
- Har Funn Maula (2021)
- Khuda Hafiz (2020)
- Solo Brathuke So Better (2020)
- Khaali Peeli (2020)
- Bunty Aur Babli 2 (2020)
- Angrezi Medium (2020)
- Baaghi 3 (2020)
- Lage Raho Kejriwal (2020)
- Housefull 4 (2019)
- Made in China (2019)
- Saand Ki Aankh (2019)
- War (2019)
- Four Weddings and a Funeral (2019)
- Student of the Year 2 (2019)
- Malal (2019)
- Thugs of Hindostan (2018)
- Open Tuborg (with Diplo) (2018)
- Namaste England (2018)
- Bogda (2018)
- Mulk (2018)
- Chacha Vidhayak Hain Humare (2018)
- Naa Peru Surya (2018)
- Gold (2018)
- Kaalakaandi (2018)
- One (2017)
- Tiger Zinda Hai (2017)
- Chef (2017)
- A Gentleman (2017)
- Befikre (2016)
- Banjo (2016)
- Udta Punjab (2016)
- Sultan (2016)
- Sarrainodu (2016)
- Miruthan (2016)
- ABCD 2 (2015)
- Bajirao Mastani (2015)
- Vedalam (2015)
- Romeo Juliet (2015)
- Kaaki Sattai (2015)
- Ungli (2014)
- Bang Bang! (2014)
- Happy New Year (2014)
- Hasee Toh Phasee (2014)
- Kaththi (2014)
- Vanakkam Chennai (2013)
- Chennai Express (2013)
- Gippi (2013)
- Yeh Jawaani Hai Deewani (2013)
- Akaash Vani (2013)
- Race 2 (2013)
- Student of the Year (2012)
- Talaash (2012)
- Kyaa Super Kool Hain Hum (2012)
- Shanghai (2012)
- Vicky Donor (2012)
- Ishaqzaade (2012)
- Ek Main Aur Ekk Tu (2012)
- Don 2 (2011)
- Ladies vs Ricky Bahl (2011)
- Ra.One (2011)
- Mujhse Fraaandship Karoge (2011)
- Zindagi Na Milegi Dobara (2011)
- Bbuddah... Hoga Terra Baap (2011)
- Pyar Ka Punchnama (2011)
- Game (2011)
- Patiala House (2011)
- No One Killed Jessica (2011)
- Tees Maar Khan (2010)
- Break Ke Baad (2010)
- Knock Out (2010)
- Anjaana Anjaani (2010)
- We Are Family (2010)
- I Hate Luv Storys (2010)
- Kites (2010)
- Paathshaala (2010)
- Hum Tum Aur Ghost (2010)
- Pyaar Impossible (2010)
- Rocket Singh: Salesman of the Year (2009)
- Kurbaan (2009)
- Aladin (2009)
- London Dreams (2009)
- Kaminey (2009)
- 8 x 10 Tasveer (2009)
- Dostana (2008)
- Bachna Ae Haseeno (2008)
- Krazzy 4 (2008)
- Tashan (2008)
- Taare Zameen Par (2007)
- Cash (2007)
- Ta Ra Rum Pum (2007)
- Honeymoon Travels Pvt. Ltd. (2007)
- I See You (2006)
- Dhoom 2 (2006)
- Golmaal (2006)
- Taxi Number 9211 (2006)
- Bluffmaster (2005)
- Ek Ajnabee (2005)
- Karam (2005)
- Shabd (2005)
- Popcorn Khao! Mast Ho Jao (2004)
- Jhankaar Beats (2003)

== Songwriting credits ==
- Pyaar Mein Kabhi Kabhi – "Musu Musu Hasi", "Woh Naujawan Hai", "Lakhon Deewane", "Pehli Baar" Along with Raj Kaushal (1993)
- Waisa Bhi Hota Hai Part II – "Allah ke Bande" (2003)
- Jhankaar Beats – All songs (2003)
- Popcorn Khao! Mast Ho Jao – All songs (2004)
- Karam – "Tinka Tinka" (2005)
- Bluffmaster! – (2005)
- Ek Ajnabee – "Ek Ajnabi (Mama Told Me)" (2005)
- I See You – All songs (2006)
- Golmaal – Aage Peeche (2006)
- Cash – All songs except for "Reham Kare" (2007)
- Om Shanti Om – "Ajab Si" (2007)
- Dostana – "Kuch Kum" (2008)
- Aladin – All songs except for "Bachke O Bachke" (2009)
- I Hate Luv Storys – "Bin Tere", "Bin Tere (Reprise)", "Jab Mila Tu" (2010)
- Anjaana Anjaani – "Hairat,"I Feel Good", "Tujhe Bhula Diya" (Along with Kumar), "Aas Pas Khuda" & "Aas Pas Khuda (Reprise)" (Along with Shekhar) (2010)
- Tees Maar Khan – "Sheila Ki Jawani" (2010)
- Ra.One – "Chamak Chalo" (Along with Shekhar and Niranjan Iyengar), "Raftarein" (2011)
- Kahaani – "Ami Shotti Bolchi," Kahaani (Male), Kahaani (Female) (2012)
- Shanghai – (2012) – "Imported Kamariya"
- Gippi – Along with Anvita Dutt (2013)
- Bang Bang! – Tu Meri", "Bang Bang" (2014)
- Banjo – "Banjo Party" Along with Ravi Jadhav (2016)
- Sultan – "Tuk Tuk Rap" (2016)
- Tiger Zinda Hai – "Swag Se Swagat Rap"(2017)
- War – "Khalid's theme English Rap" (2019)
- Bob Biswas – "Tu Toh Gaya Re" (2021)
- Jayeshbhai Jordaar – "Firecracker (English)" along with Vayu and Kumaar (2022)
- Pathaan – "Besharam Rang" along with Kumaar (2023)
- The Ba***ds of Bollywood – "Who's Your Daddy" along with Akshat Verma (2025)

== Discography ==
Pentagram

- We're Not Listening (1996)
- Up (2002)
- It's OK, It's All Good (2007)
- Bloodywood (2011)

== Filmography ==
- Om Shanti Om (2007) as a director
- Tees Maar Khan (2010) as a producer in the song "Sheila Ki Jawani"
- Happy New Year (2014) as a judge
- Student of the Year 2 (2019) as a judge
- India's Got Latent (2026) as himself

== Awards and nominations ==
The following is a list of awards and nominations received by Vishal Dadlani alone. A list of awards and nominations received by Vishal–Shekhar can be seen here.

=== Apsara Film and Television Producers Guild Award ===
Year	Category	Recipient	Result	Ref.
2008	Best Lyricist	"Ankhon Mein Teri" (from Om Shanti Om)	Nominated	
2010	Best Male Playback Singer	"Dhan Te Nan" (from Kaminey) (along with Sukhwinder Singh)	Nominated	

=== BIG Star Entertainment Awards ===
Year	Category	Recipient	Result	Ref.
2013	Most Entertaining Singer (Male)	"Balam Pichkari" (from Yeh Jawaani Hai Deewani)	Nominated	

=== Filmfare Awards ===
Year	Category	Recipient	Result	Ref.
2008	Best Lyricist	"Ankhon Mein Teri" (from Om Shanti Om)	Nominated	
2010	Best Male Playback Singer	"Dhan Te Nan" (from Kaminey) (along with Sukhwinder Singh)	Nominated	
2011	Best Lyricist	"Bin Tere" (from I Hate Luv Storys)	Nominated	
2012	Best Lyricist	"Chammak Challo" (from Ra.One) (along with Niranjan Iyengar)	Nominated	
2012	Best Male Playback Singer	"Chammak Challo" (from Ra.One) (along with Akon)	Nominated	

=== Global Indian Music Academy Awards ===
Year	Category	Recipient	Result	Ref.
2011	Best lyricist	"Tujhe Bhula Diya" (from Anjaana Anjaani) (shared with Kumaar)	Nominated	
2013	Best Duet	"Radha" (from Student of the Year) (shared with Shekhar Ravjiani, Udit Narayan, Shreya Ghoshal)	Nominated	
2014	Best Duet	"Balam Pichkari" (from Yeh Jawaani Hai Deewani) (shared with Shalmali Kholgade)	Nominated	

=== International Indian Film Academy Awards ===
Year	Category	Recipient	Result	Ref.
2010	Best Male Playback Singer	"Dhan Te Nan" (from Kaminey) (along with Sukhwinder Singh)	Nominated	
2011	Best Male Playback Singer	"Adhoore" (from Break Ke Baad)	Nominated	

=== Mirchi Music Awards ===
Year	Category	Recipient	Result	Ref.
2011	Album of The Year	Ra.One	Nominated	
2012	Male Vocalist of The Year	"Jee Le Zaara" (from Talaash)	Nominated	
2014	Male Vocalist of The Year	"Tu Mera" (from Bang Bang!)	Nominated	
