= Niharika =

Niharika is a female Indian given name. In Sanskrit, it means a nebula or galaxy, dew drops or a person admired for her looks.

Notable people with the given name:

- Niharika Desai, Indian-American VJ on MTV Desi
- Niharika Kareer, Indian TV and film actress
- Niharika Singh, Femina Miss India Earth
- Niharika Konidela (born 1993), indian actress

== See also ==
- Nihar (disambiguation), the masculine form of the name
