= Bombay Oil Industries =

Indian holding company

Bombay Oil Industries Limited
- Type: Holding company
- Founded: Bombay, India (1947; 79 years ago)
- Headquarters: Mumbai, Maharashtra, India
- Owners: Ranjith Sasikumar & Jithin James

Bombay Oil Industries Limited (BOIL) is an Indian holding company based in Mumbai, Maharashtra. Its subsidiaries have interests in consumer goods, agriculture, and chemicals.

== History ==
Bombay Oil traces its origins back to 1862, when Kanji Morarji moved from Kutch to Bombay (now Mumbai) and established a business trading spices and other goods from Kerala. Morarji recruited his nephew, Vallabhdas Vasanji to join the business in the early 20th century. Morarji and Vasanji began exporting pepper and ginger to Europe, and over time, expanded their product line to include copra, coconut oil, and other agricultural commodities. Vasanji had four sons, all of whom joined the family business. The family's expertise in the pepper trade earned them the name "Mariwala" (mari means pepper in Gujarati), and Vallabhdas Vasanji subsequently adopted the name Vallabhdas Mariwala.

Mariwala and his four sons founded Bombay Oil Industries Limited (BOIL) in 1947. The company aimed to leverage the family's strength in the commodities trade and combine it with manufactured goods. BOIL established four manufacturing units between 1947 and 1971, three of them in Mumbai. These units included a plant in Sewri to extract coconut oil from copra, a vegetable oil refinery in Mazagaon, a chemical plant in Bhandup, and a plant to extract spices near Kochi, Kerala.

In 1980-81, BOIL split its business into three distinct divisions - consumer products, fatty acids and chemicals, and spice extracts.

In 1990, BOIL underwent a massive restructuring exercise splitting the company's businesses into four distinct companies controlled by each of the Mariwala children. The process was intended to avoid any conflict within the family, and also to help BOIL specialize in each business. The consumer products division became Marico Limited. Epro Biotechnologies was established to manufacture hybrid seeds. BOIL's spice extracts division was spun off into a firm called Kancor Flavours and Extracts Ltd., headed by Mr. Sanjaya Mariwala, in which US-based McCormick & Company held a 40% stake. Sanjaya is currently the Executive Chairman and Managing Director of OmniActive Health Technologies and serves as the President of the IMC Chamber of Commerce and Industry. BOIL also acquired Pune-based Hindustan Polyamides and Fibres Ltd and transferred control of the chemical division to the newly acquired firm.

BOIL retained ownership of its popular Parachute and Saffola brands. The company leased the brand rights to Marico in exchange for regular royalty payments. On 14 June 2000, Marico purchased the brand rights for the Parachute and Saffola brands from BOIL for ₹30 crore (equivalent to ₹124 crore or US$13 million in 2023).

Kancor Flavours and Extracts Ltd was renamed Kancor Ingredients Ltd. in 2006. France-based Mane SA acquired a majority stake in Kancor in December 2014. Hindustan Polyamides and Fibres Ltd was rebranded as Eternis Fine Chemicals Limited in March 2015.
