= Sanjiv Mehta (British businessman) =

India-born British businessman, owner of "The East India Company" (born 1961)

- Born: October 1961 (age 64–65); Mumbai
- Education: Sydenham College
- Occupation: Businessperson

Sanjiv Mehta (born October 1961) is an India-born British businessman. He is the owner of "the East India Company", which he launched in 2010, presenting it as a revival of the historic East India Company that was dissolved on 1 June 1874.

== Early life ==
Sanjiv Mehta was born in a Gujarati Jain family in Mumbai, India. His grandfather Gafurchand Mehta lived in Belgium in the 1920s, and started a diamond trading business. Sanjiv Mehta's father Mahendra was born in Antwerp in 1933, but Gafurchand brought the family back to India in 1938.

Mehta graduated from Sydenham College Mumbai, and also attended the Gemological Institute of America in Los Angeles.

== Business career ==
Mehta joined his father's diamond business in 1983. While his elder brother Rajiv focused on industrial diamonds, Sanjiv focused on the jewellery business. He marketed this business at industry exhibitions in the Persian Gulf countries, Hong Kong and the United States. He also established a mail order trading business in India, in partnership with Diners Club.

In 1989, Mehta left India for London, finding it hard to expand his business in the pre-liberalisation era. In London, he set up a mail order business, selling UK-made household products within the country. Subsequently, he bought a scrapyard in Newcastle upon Tyne, and started selling steel to small plants in India. His father-in-law Jasubhai Shah had been selling pharmaceutical products in the Soviet Union, which helped Mehta establish trade there as well. The new business involved buying heavy crude oil from Mangyshlak in Kazakhstan, transporting it to a Black Sea port using a leased railway line and then shipping it to Genoa, Italy. Once the oil prices started rising, bigger companies showed interest in Kazakhstan, forcing Mehta to move out. He exported Hindustan Unilever products to Russia. Subsequently, he dealt with different types of goods, operating out of Taipei, Houston, Tehran and Dubai.

=== The East India Company ===
In the mid-2000s, Mehta bought a majority stake in several companies that had been renamed or newly incorporated with names similar to the historical East India Company in the early 2000s, with Graeme David Robert Clissold, Timothy Vaughan Meadows-Smith and others as their Directors. For example, new companies called "The East India Company Tea Bars Limited" and "The East India Company Tea Rooms Limited" had been founded in 2000, with Clissold and Meadows-Smith as their officers. Similarly, Edgerton International (founded in 1992) had been renamed to "The East India Company Limited", after Clissold and Meadows-Smith became its officers in 2002.

Mehta gradually bought stakes in these companies for 18 months, buying out the last investor in 2006. He states that he purchased the business from 30 to 40 owners in 2005.

Mehta re-launched the business as a purported revival of the historic East India Company in 2010, operating in the luxury retail space. He also established (or renamed) several subsidiary companies with "East India Company" in their names:

According to Mehta, in the 1980s, some British investors sought approval from the British government to start a new company with the same title as that of the historical East India Company, which had ceased to exist in 1874. In a 2011 interview, Mehta did not name these individuals, but claimed that they had secured the rights to the original East India Company's assets, such as its coat of arms and merchant's mark. According to him, these investors operated the company as a hobby, and contacted him to "streamline their distribution network". He then decided to take over this company. Mehta further states that after buying these companies, he took a one-year break from his other businesses, and travelled around the world to learn about the historic East India Company's heritage.

In 2020, a trademark opposition request made by Mehta's The East India Company Spirits Pte Ltd, regarding a word mark similarly containing "East India" was rejected, in a decision issued by the UK Intellectual Property Office. The decision noted that the company "has no exclusive rights to company names featuring East India".

By 2011, Mehta had invested around £20 million in the new business. Mehta's business also attracted investment from other companies including the India-based Mahindra Group (2011) and the UAE-based Lulu Group (2014).

From 2016 to 2025, The East India Company issued commemorative coins in association with St. Helena and the Royal Mint.

Mehta's revived East India Company appointed liquidators in October 2025, facing over £950,000 in debts. By February 2026 its website had been taken offline, its retail storefronts were closed, and creditors had filed a winding-up petition to its final remaining corporate entity.
