= Dr. Homi Bhabha State University =

Indian public state University

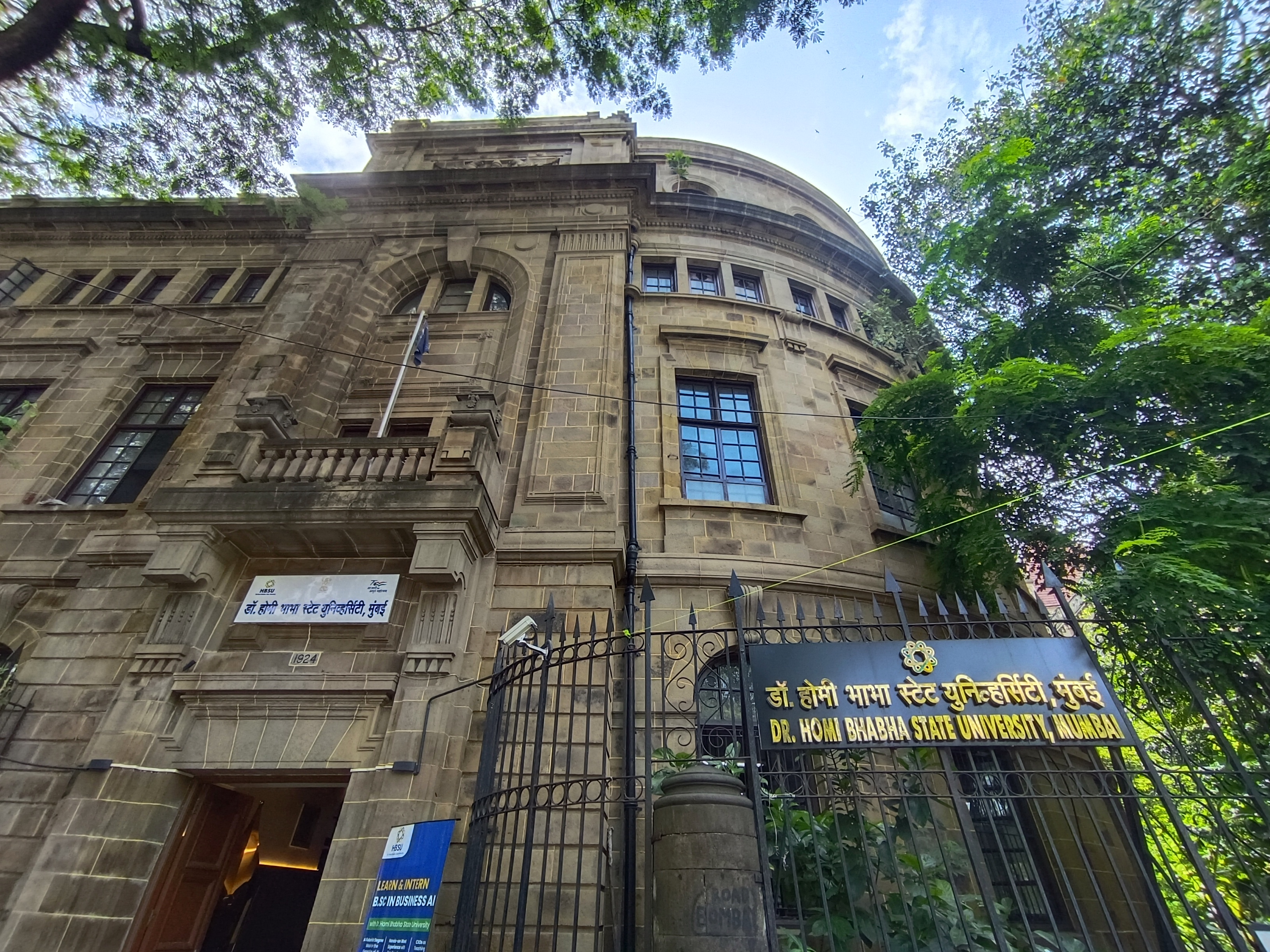
- Type: Public research university
- Established: 2019; 7 years ago
- Chancellor: Governor of Maharashtra
- Vice-Chancellor: Dr. Rajanish Kamalakar Kamat
- Location: Mumbai, Maharashtra, India
- Campus: Urban
- Website: www.hbsu.ac.in

Dr. Homi Bhabha State University (HBSU) is a public state university located in Mumbai, Maharashtra, India. It was established in 2019 as a cluster university, combining four colleges formerly under the University of Mumbai — Elphinstone College, Sydenham College, Secondary Training College and The Institute of Science, the latter being the main college.
