= Elphinstone College =

Constituent of Dr. Homi Bhabha State University in Mumbai, India

- Coat of Arms of the Elphinstone College (Note: The original coat of arms was Mountstuart Elphinstone's family's with banner: Causae memento iactae, which translates from Latin to "Remember the cause that has been cast" or "Remember the die is cast".) (Note: The original Latin motto was changed to a Sanskrit one from the Mahabharata in 1956 on occasion of the college's centenary that year. It is "यतो धर्मस्ततो जयः" (Yato Dharmastato Jaya), which translates to "Where there is Righteousness, there shall be Victory".)
- Other name: Elphi
- Type: Public
- Established: 1856; 170 years ago
- Founders: Jagannath Shankarseth, Mountstuart Elphinstone
- Parent institution: Government of Maharashtra
- Academic affiliations: Dr. Homi Bhabha State University
- Principal: Dr. Saumitra Sawant
- Location: 156, Mahatma Gandhi Road, Mantralaya, Mumbai, Maharashtra, 400023, India; 18.9271413°N 72.8284738°E
- Campus: Urban
- Website: www.elphinstone.ac.in

UNESCO World Heritage Site
- Criteria: Cultural: (ii) (iv)
- Designated: 2018 (43rd session)
- Part of: Victorian Gothic and Art Deco Ensembles of Mumbai
- Reference no.: 1480

Elphinstone College is one of the constituent colleges of Dr. Homi Bhabha State University, a state cluster university. Established in 1856, it is one of the oldest colleges in Mumbai. The college played a major role in shaping and developing the educational landscape of the city and was instrumental in the inception of the University of Mumbai.

The college has many notable alumni, including B. R. Ambedkar, Bal Gangadhar Tilak, Virchand Gandhi, Badruddin Tyabji, Pherozeshah Mehta, Nanabhai Haridas, Kashinath Trimbak Telang, Justice Mahadev Govind Ranade and Jamsetji Tata and teachers such as Dadabhai Naoroji. It played a key role in the spread of education in Mumbai. In 2019, it ended its affiliation with the University of Mumbai.

In 2006, the college marked its sesquicentennial (1856–2006). It offers undergraduate-level courses in the arts, sciences, and commerce.

== History ==
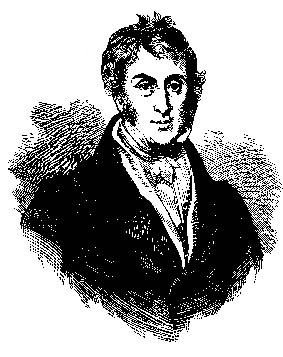
Mountstuart Elphinstone

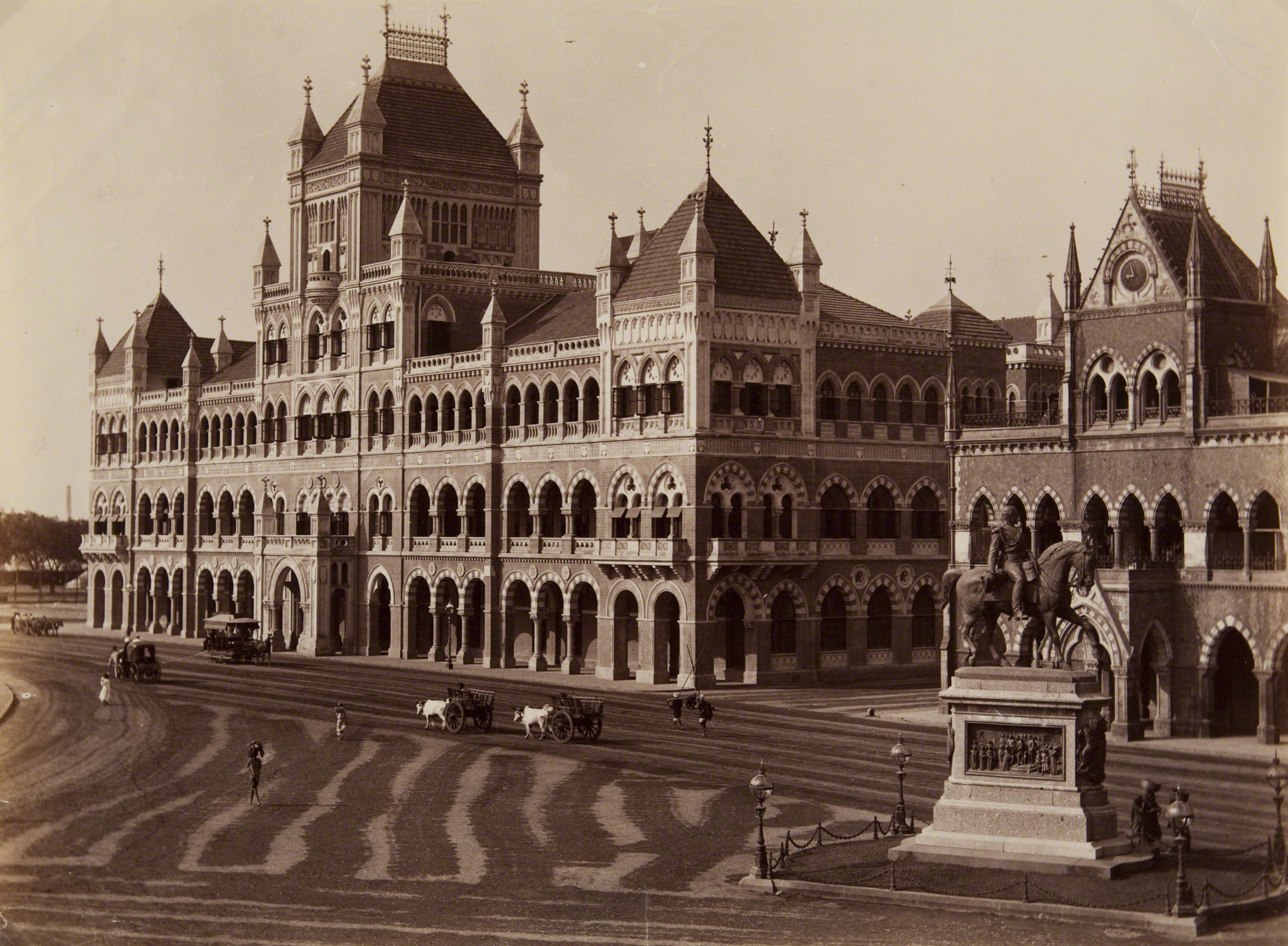
Elphinstone College in the late 19th century

By the 19th century, Mumbai was a prosperous center for maritime trade and commerce. In 1824, an English school was set up by the Bombay Native Education Society for Indian students.

In 1827, a resolution was passed that an institution for the promotion of education should be established under Bombay Native Education Society and be designated as "Elphinstone College" (distinct from High School). This was named after Mountstuart Elphinstone, the departing Governor of the Bombay Presidency, who was responsible for beginning higher education in the city. An exuberant amount of Rs. 2,29,636.00 was collected by public subscription to fund teaching professorships in the English language and the Arts, Science, and Literature of Europe.

The college was formally constituted in 1835. The classes commenced in 1836, at Town Hall, with the first two professors: Arthur Bedford Orlebar (natural philosophy) - (i.e. science) and John Harkness (general literature - i.e. classics). In 1840, the professors' classes were amalgamated with the Society's High School to form the Elphinstone Native Education Institution. In 1845, the name was shortened to Elphinstone Institution.

Elphinstone College became a distinct institution, separated from the high school, on 1 April 1856. This year is officially considered to be the year of the establishment of Elphinstone College.

The college was affiliated with the University of Mumbai in 1860.

In 1871, Elphinstone College got its building in Byculla. James Trubshawe, an architect who flourished in the early part of the 19th century, designed the structure, which was built by the engineer, John Adams. This older Elphinstone College building stands opposite the Jijamata Udyaan in Byculla, Mumbai. It is now a hospital, and a second Elphinstone College across the Jehangir Art Gallery was built a decade later.

=== Role in inception of University Of Mumbai & Other colleges ===
The Elphinstone College played a pivotal role in the inception of The University Of Mumbai which was established in 1857, the same year as India's first revolt. The university's initial classes were held at the college's Byculla building and were subsequently moved to the present Fort campus of the same.

The college also played a major role in formalizing legal education in India. The esteemed "Perry Professorship" (A chair of Jurisprudence at the University Of Mumbai) was set up at Elphinstone in 1855. One of the best-known lawyers of the time, Barrister R. T. Reid (LL. B. Bar-at-Law) was appointed the first Perry Professor of Jurisprudence and the Government Law School was establishment. This institution later came to be known as the Government Law College, Mumbai. It is the oldest law school in Asia.

In 1948, it was suggested that Elphinstone College's premises were to be used (during morning hours) for initial classes of Jai Hind College. The proposal was accepted and admission started for the Arts Faculty in June of the same year. A formal inauguration took place in September 1948 at the Elphinstone College Library Hall.

The Sir J. J. School of Arts was founded in 1857 and was instituted to offer drawing classes. Its Initial classes were also held at Elphinstone.

== Academics ==
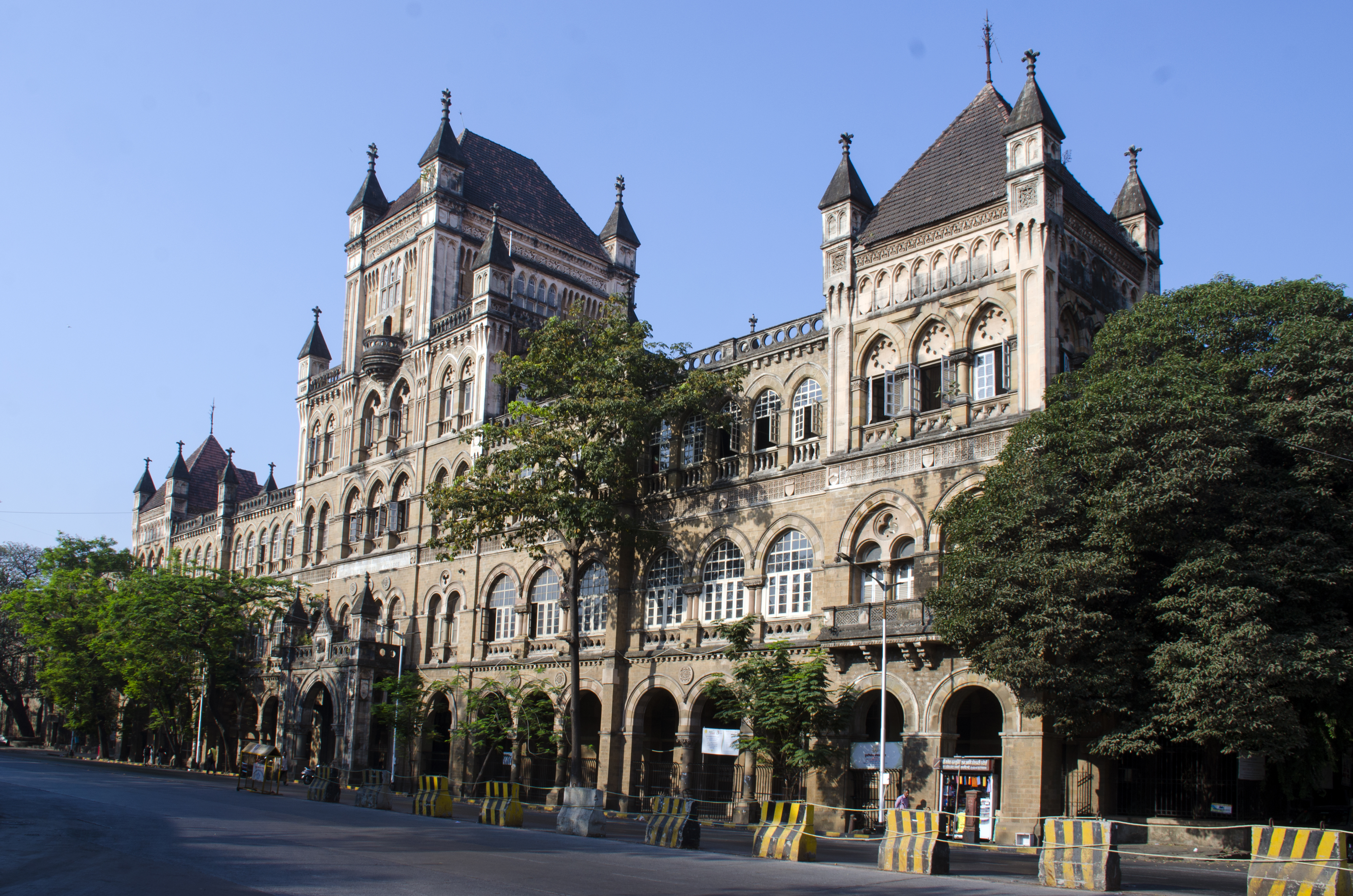
Elphinstone college

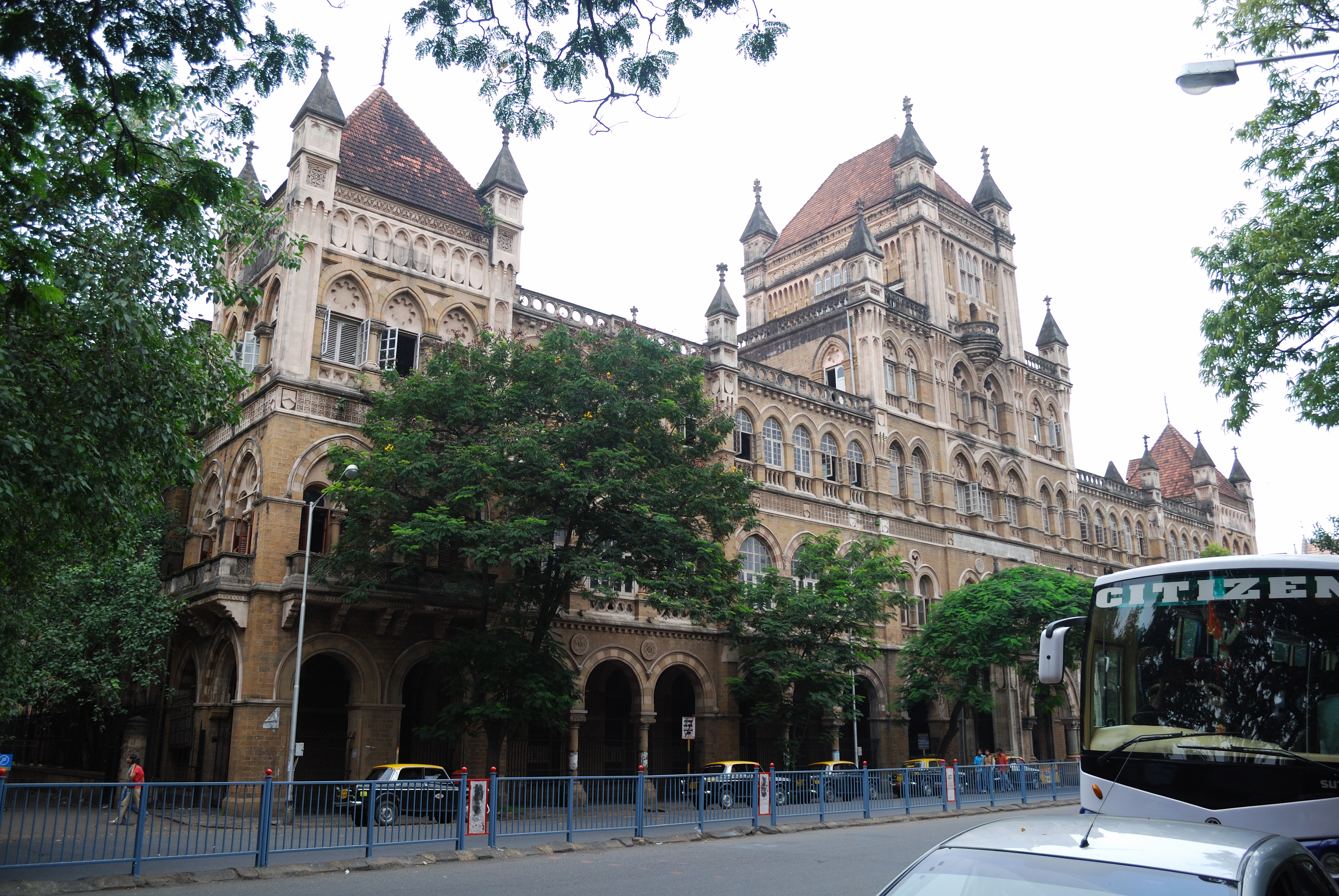
Elphinstone College Mumbai

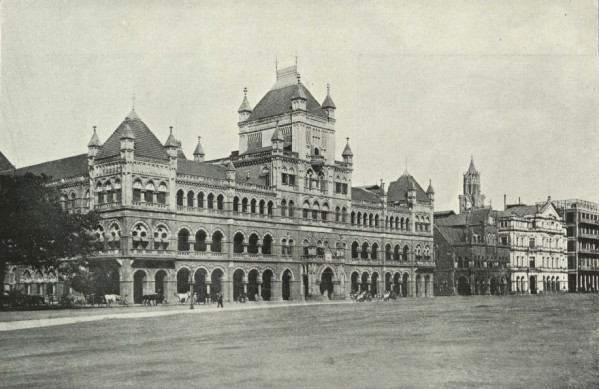
Elphinstone College, c. 1905

The Elphinstone College consists of two academic entities: Junior and Degree colleges.

Degree or "senior" college was affiliated to University of Mumbai till 2019. And, it was later made a constituent college of Dr. Homi Bhabha State University. This was a newly formed state owned cluster university. It was the first of its kind. After mere months, another state cluster university was formed in Mumbai called the HSNC University, which included institutes like KC College and HR College.

The Junior college of the institution is affiliated to the Maharashtra State Board (or commonly known as HSC Board). It provides education at a higher secondary or high school level.

=== Courses offered ===
==== Senior college ====
- B.Sc in Physics, Chemistry, Computer Science, Life Sciences
- B.A. in Economics, English, Geography, Hindi, History, Mathematics, Statistics, Marathi, Sociology, Psychology
- B.Comm in

==== Junior college ====
- Higher Secondary School Certificate in Arts, Commerce and Science

== Facilities ==
- Hostels: Government Colleges Hostel, Mumbai for boys; Telang Memorial Hostel and Savitridevi Phule Hostel for girls.
- Gymkhana
- Computer facilities
- Library (with more than 90,000 books)

== Noteworthy features ==
=== Heritage College building ===
The college building, with its Gothic architecture, has been classified as a grade 1 heritage structure. It is one of the most identified buildings of South Mumbai as a symbol of heritage.

Locally, the college is famous for its Romanesque Transitional style building that has been categorised as Grade I Heritage structure. The iconic building was designed by Trubshaw. And, it was made under the supervision of Khan Bahadur Muncherjee Murzban, and completed in 1888.

In 2004, the college was awarded the Asia-Pacific Heritage Award for Culture Heritage Conservation by UNESCO.

== Festivals ==
=== Maharashtrotsav ===
Maharashtrotsav is a National Level Inter-College Cultural Festival organized by all the students and faculties of Elphinstone College. In 2011–2012, it gathered a crowd of more than 75 colleges with nearly 2500 students, which was then a State Level Event. In 2012–2013, marked huge progress in its type making it National Level Festival with nearly 5000 students from more than 130 colleges across India.

TechTsar Logo

=== TechStar ===
TechTsar started back in 2009, with a budget of INR 75,000, which was contributed by advertisements in the TechTsar brochure and banners. Amongst the notable past corporate sponsors such as Bank of Maharashtra, Dena Bank, Airtel, and many more.

The name of the festival was inspired by two words: Technology [tech] and King [Tsar] and was proposed by Elphinstone College alumni Rohan Bhambhani. The motto is "Merging Talent with Technology." The festival consists of many events such as C and Java debugging, LAN gaming, quiz, debate, photography, logo designing, grand Prix, treasure hunt, etc. Students from many colleges across Mumbai, Thane, and Navi Mumbai participate. The festival usually takes place in the final week of November.

== Location ==
The college is located in the Kala Ghoda area of South Mumbai. Several landmarks, business districts and waters of Arabian Sea are close by.

The college is easily accessible by train (from Churchgate and CSMT) and bus.

== Notable alumni ==
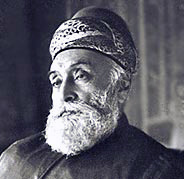
Jamsetji Tata, an alumnus of Elphinstone College

- B. R. Ambedkar, an Indian jurist, Bharat Ratna, economist, scholar, political leader, a Buddhist revivalist, and the chief architect of the Constitution of India.
- Kishori Amonkar, Padma Vibhushan, Hindustani classical music performer.
- Dhiruben Patel, a Novelist, Playwright and Translator. Sahitya Akademi Award and Ranjitram Suvarna Chandrak Award Winner.
- Arjun Appadurai, postcolonial scholar of global media and culture.
- Dilip Abreu, economics professor, game theorist, Princeton University.
- Madhav Apte, cricketer.
- Mirza Qaleech Baig, writer, poet, scholar from Sindh. Given the title of 'Shams Ul Ulama' by the British government.
- Homi J. Bhabha, nuclear physicist who had a major role in the development of the Indian atomic energy program.
- Homi K. Bhabha, Anne F. Rothenberg Professor of English and American Literature and Language and Director of the Humanities Center, Harvard University
- P. N. Bhagwati, Chief Justice of India (1985–1986).
- R. G. Bhandarkar, scholar and social reformer.
- Devdatta Dabholkar, educationist, Gandhian and socialist.
- Amit Chaudhuri, Indian English writer, Sahitya Akademi award winner
- Bhulabhai Desai, lawyer involved in the Indian independence movement.
- Mahadev Desai, independence activist and writer best remembered as Mahatma Gandhi's personal secretary.
- Xerxes Desai, first managing director of Titan Watches (Titan Company)
- C. D. Deshmukh, economist and former Finance Minister of India.
- Purushottam Laxman Deshpande, Marathi author, playwright, performing artist, director and music director.
- Sanjay Dutt, Filmfare winning Bollywood actor.
- Shapurji Edalji, thought to be the first South Asian to become a vicar in England.
- Virchand Gandhi, represented Jainism at the first World Parliament of Religions held in Chicago in 1893.
- Kunal Ganjawala, singer.
- Vishnu Vasudev Narlikar, famous physicist
- G. S. Ghurye, founder of Indian sociology; President of Indian Sociological Society; Professor & Head (Dept. of Sociology) at University of Mumbai (Erstwhile, University of Bombay)
- M. N. Srinivas, sociologist & social anthropologist; Professor at Delhi School of Economics; Fellow at All Souls College, Oxford (University of Oxford)
- Anuradha Ghandy, political leader and member of Central Committee of Communist Party of India (Marxist–Leninist)
- Sanjoy Ghose, rural management, community health, development media.
- Gopal Krishna Gokhale, founding member of the Indian independence movement, social reformer.
- Ranjit Hoskote, poet, art critic, cultural theorist and curator.
- Syeda Bilgrami Imam, writer, activist and a member of the National Commission for Minorities (NCM)
- Raghavan N. Iyer, philosopher and academic.
- Suresh Joshi, major Gujarati writer, critic and editor who established modernism in Gujarati.
- Manilal Dwivedi, Gujarati writer, poet and editor
- Mukesh Khanna, television actor.
- Manish Malhotra, fashion designer.
- Mahesh Manjrekar, actor, director, producer
- Sujata Manohar, former judge of the Supreme Court of India.
- Sonal Mansingh, Padma Vibhushan, Odissi dancer.
- Pherozeshah Mehta, a political leader, activist, and leading lawyer, who was knighted by the British Government for his service to the law.
- Vijay Merchant, cricketer.
- Iskander Mirza, last Governor-General of the Dominion of Pakistan and the first President of Pakistan.
- Dadabhai Naoroji, intellectual, educator, cotton trader, and an early Indian political leader, being the first Asian to sit in the British House of Commons.
- Shernaz Patel, theatre and film actor.
- Smita Patil, National Film Award for Best Actress, 1977 and 1980.
- Dattu Phadkar, cricketer.
- M. V. Rajadhyaksha, Marathi writer and critic.
- Mahadev Govind Ranade, judge, author, and social reformer.
- Soni Razdan Bollywood actress and film director
- Swaroop Sampat, former Miss India and Bollywood actress.
- Arshia Sattar, Translation of classical Sanskrit texts, author, documentary film maker, director of courses on Indian culture
- Hormasji Maneckji Seervai, former Advocate General of Maharashtra.
- Teesta Setalvad, Civil rights activist and journalist
- Jamsetji Tata, entrepreneur and industrialist, founder of the Tata Group.
- Ratanji Dadabhoy Tata, Parsi businessman.
- Nanabhai Haridas, first Indian judge at the Bombay High Court.
- K. T. Telang, judge and oriental scholar.
- Nakul Chopra, CEO of BARC India & Former CEO of Publicis South Asia
- Bal Gangadhar Tilak, Nationalist, social reformer and freedom fighter, who was the first popular leader of the Indian Independence Movement.
- Ajit Wadekar, international cricketer, later served as both captain and manager of the Indian cricket team.
- Saryu Doshi, art historian and Padma Shri awardee
- Salman Khan, Bollywood actor and promoter of Being Human trust.
- Zubeida Rahimtoola, political activist
- Premchand Roychand, businessman
- Kavasji Naegamvala, Astronomer
- Karanvir Bohra, Indian television actor
- Shoma Sen, women's rights activist
- Shashikala Kakodkar, Second Chief Minister of Goa, Daman & Diu (India), succeeding her father, Dayanand Bandodkar, who was the First Chief Minister
- Karsandas Mulji, journalist, social reformer and administrator
- Narmad, Indian Gujarati-language poet, playwright, essayist, orator, lexicographer and reformer
- Mahipatram Rupram Nilkanth, Gujarati educationist, reformer, novelist and biographer
- Tribhuvandas Kalyandas Gajjar, industrial chemist, educator and industrialist
- Nadeem Saifi of Nadeem-Shravan, Music Composer

== See also ==
- List of colleges in Mumbai
- Dr. Homi Bhabha State University
- HSNC University, Mumbai
- University of Mumbai
