= Girish Paranjpe =

Indian businessman

Girish S. Paranjpe
- Born: 1958 (age 67–68)
- Occupations: Venture Capitalist, Operating Partner Private Equity, Managing director of international, bloom energy corporation 20:30, 25 January 2012 (utc), ex.jt. ceo – it business, Wipro Ltd.

Girish Paranjpe (born 1958) is an Indian business executive and venture capitalist. He is associated with Exfinity Venture Partners and has served as an independent director on the boards of several companies, including Axis Bank.

== Career ==
Paranjpe joined Wipro in 1990 and held a broad range of leadership positions in critical portfolios across the Wipro Corporation during his tenure. The leadership structure at Wipro included Girish Paranjpe and Suresh Vaswani serving jointly as co-CEOs of the company's IT business, a model the company said was designed to address global scale and operational complexity.

Paranjpe's direct responsibilities included the following business units: Financial Services, Communication, Media, Telecom and Technology vertical. Paranjpe was also directly responsible for driving Consulting, Business Technology Services, Product Engineering Solutions and other functions under him are Global Delivery, CTO and CIO office & Operations.

In a 2009 interview, Paranjpe stated that the global financial crisis had made Wipro more agile in its operations and decision-making. He noted that the company had adapted its business approach during the downturn to respond faster to market changes.

Paranjpe had represented Wipro and the IT Industry in various public forums including the Prime Minister's Task Force on Information Technology, the NASSCOM, and leading global business schools. Paranjpe is a Fellow Member of the Institute of Chartered Accountants of India and the Institute of Cost and Works Accountants of India. He attended Sydenham College, Mumbai.

In November 2013, Paranjpe joined Advent International, a global private equity firm, as an Operating Partner, according to coverage by major business media.

Paranjpe was also the managing director of Bloom Energy International.

Paranjpe is currently associated with Exfinity Venture Partners, an early-stage venture capital fund focused on technology investments, where he is listed as a General Partner.
