= Kaya Limited =

Indian multinational skincare, haircare, and bodycare treatment provider

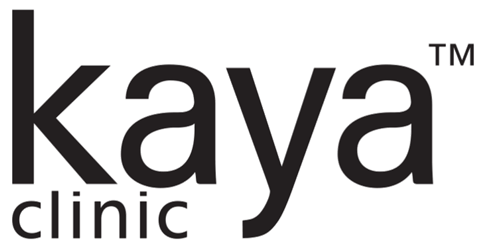
- Kaya Clinic
- Formerly: Marico Kaya Enterprises
- Traded as: NSE: KAYA; BSE: 539276
- Industry: Skincare
- Founded: 2003; 23 years ago
- Founder: Harsh Mariwala
- Headquarters: Mumbai, Maharashtra, India
- Area served: India; Middle East
- Key people: Harsh Mariwala (Chairman and MD); Rajiv Suri (Global CEO); Arihant Dhariwal (CFO)
- Services: Skincare; Haircare; Personal care Beauty services
- Revenue: ▲₹410.3 crore (2017)
- Website: www.kaya.in www.kayaskinclinic.com

Kaya Clinic (also known as Kaya Skin Clinic) is an Indian multinational skincare, haircare, and bodycare treatment provider. It was founded in 2003 by Harsh Mariwala, the chairman of Marico.

There are more than 75 Kaya Clinics across 26 cities in India. Kaya also has 23 clinics across 3 countries in West Asia and e-commerce portals in India & Middle East.

== History ==
Harsh Mariwala conceptualized the prototype of Kaya Skin Clinic at Marico's corporate office in 2002. The company was incorporated on 27 March 2003 as part of Marico Limited.

In 2010, Kaya Limited acquired Singapore-based company Derma Rx, which they later divested to KV Asia Capital in December 2013.

It was demerged from Marico in September 2013 to become an independent entity called Marico Kaya Enterprises and its shares began trading on NSE and BSE in July 2014. In May 2015, as a result of a scheme of arrangement, Marico Kaya shares were suspended from trading, and shareholders were allotted equal number of Kaya Limited shares, which got listed on the exchanges in August 2015.

In 2016, Kaya rebranded itself as Kaya Clinic.

== Shareholding ==
The majority of the Kaya Limited's shares (60.70%) are held by the promoters group. The rest is divided between the individual public (20.93%), foreign institutions (6.30%), Mutual Funds (3.63%), Body Corporate (5.65%) and others as on 7 August 2015.

Indian investor and fund manager Porinju Veliyath, on behalf of his portfolio management firm Equity Intelligence India Ltd, bought a 5% stake in Kaya Limited on 8 June 2017.
