= JM Financial =

Indian financial services group

JM Financial Ltd.
- Type: Public
- Traded as: NSE: JMFINANCIL; BSE: 523405; NSE NIFTY 500 Constituent
- ISIN: INE780C01023
- Industry: Financial services
- Founded: 1973; 53 years ago
- Founder: Nimesh Kampani
- Headquarters: Mumbai, India
- Key people: Nimesh Kampani (chairman); Vishal Kampani (vice chairman); Atul Mehra (Managing Director); Adi Patel (managing director)
- Services: Investment banking Mortgage lending Investment management Asset management Mutual funds Exchange-traded funds
- Revenue: ▲₹37.63 billion (US$400 million) (31 March 2022)
- Net income: ▲₹9.92 billion (US$110 million) (31 March 2022)
- Total assets: ▲₹258 billion (US$2.8 billion) (31 March 2022)
- Total equity: ▲₹106 billion (US$1.1 billion) (31 March 2022)
- Number of employees: ▲4,680 (2025)
- Website: jmfl.com

JM Financial Ltd. (JMFL) is an Indian financial services group headquartered in Mumbai and has branches across India. It also has overseas branches in Ebene, Singapore, New Jersey and Dubai although almost all the group's business are domestic operations in India.

== History ==
JM Financial was founded in 1973 by Mahendra Kampani and Nimesh Kampani as a spin-off from Jamnadas Morarjee Securities' investment banking arm and was originally set up as a consultancy practice. In 1986, it was incorporated as a private limited company to engage in the business of Stock-broking.

In 1991, it listed on the Bombay Stock Exchange becoming a publicly listed company group and in 2006 it held a secondary listing on the National Stock Exchange of India. The group expanded into different businesses outside Stock-broking which include Asset management in 1994, Private equity in 2006, Real estate investment in 2007, Distressed Credit in 2008 and Mortgage lending in 2017.

In 1999, JM Financial and Morgan Stanley set up a Joint venture in India named JM Morgan Stanley. In February 2007, Morgan Stanley announced the end of JM Morgan Stanley Joint Venture agreement. It acquired JM Financial's 49% stake in the institutional brokerage business, and sold its 49% stake in the Investment banking business to JM Financial.

In 2021, JM Financial launched BondsKart, a SEBI regulated Online Bond Platform Provide (OBPP) to facilitate retail investments in Fixed-Income securities and corporate bonds within the secondary market.

== Organization ==
JM Financial has four main business segments: 1. Investment banking, Wealth management and Securities Business (IWS); 2. Mortgage lending; 3. Distressed Credit and 4. Asset Management. The IWS and Mortgage lending segments make up the majority of the group's revenue. Almost all of the group's revenue is from only India.

Although JM Financial is a publicly listed company, Kampani and his family still exhibit significance influence over it. According to shareholding disclosures, Kampani and his family hold over 15% of the group's shares. This doesn't include indirect ownership via private entities etc.

=== Rankings ===
According to Mergermarket League tables, JM Financial is usually ranked in the top 10 firms for India deals by value with its 2021 rank being No. 4.

== Controversies ==
=== Police investigation into Nimesh Kampani ===
In 2009, JM Financial Founder, chairman and managing director, Nimesh Kampani was under police investigation for alleged involvement of defrauding depositors by Hyderabad-based Nagarjuna Finance Ltd. Kampani was reported hiding in Dubai temporarily to avoid arrest. In April 2009, the Supreme Court of India granted a stay on the arrest for Kampani. After two years, Kampani returned to India but stepped back from daily operations. In 2016, he formally resigned from his position as managing director and handed over control of JM Financial to his son, Vishal Kampani.

=== SEC regulatory fine due to violation of registration rules ===
In 2012, the U.S. Securities and Exchange Commission (SEC) fined JM Financial and three other Indian securities firms, US$1.8 million for violating registration rules. The firms solicited and provided brokerage services to U.S. investors without being registered with the SEC as required under the federal securities laws.

=== Insider trading settlement ===
In 2020, Atul Saraogi, a vice president at JM Financial settled an alleged insider trading case with the Securities and Exchange Board of India (SEBI) by paying ₹1.5 million. From 2013 to 2014, Saraogi engaged in off-market transactions of JM financial shares without obtaining approval from his employer.

=== Ban on managing debt issues ===
In June 2024, SEBI banned JM Financial from acting as a lead manager for public issues of debt securities until March 31, 2025, in a case of alleged irregularities in a public issue of non-convertible debentures (NCDs).
