= Kotak Life Insurance =

Indian Private life insurance company

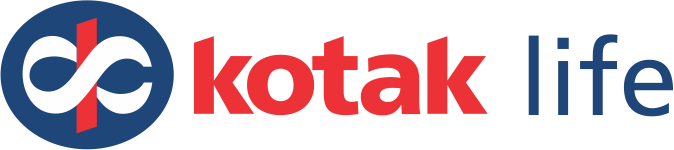
- Trade name: KLI
- Formerly: Kotak Mahindra Old Mutual Life Insurance Limited
- Type: Private
- Industry: Financial services
- Founded: 2001
- Headquarters: 8th Floor, Plot # C- 12, G- Block, BKC, Bandra (E), Mumbai- 400051
- Key people: Uday Kotak (Chairman); Mahesh Balasubramanian (MD)
- Products: Life insurance; Term life insurance; Unit-linked insurance plan; Endowment policy; Money-back policy; Whole life insurance; Retirement plans
- Owner: Kotak Mahindra Bank
- Website: www.kotaklife.com

Kotak Mahindra Life Insurance Company Limited is a privately held life insurance company based in India. It was established in 2001 and currently serves 46 million customers in 148 cities and towns across India.

The company provides protection, retirement, savings, investment, and annuity plans.

== Corporate history ==
The Kotak Mahindra Group was founded in 1985 as a provider of financial services. In February 2003, Kotak Mahindra Finance Ltd (KMFL), the Group's flagship company, received banking license from the Reserve Bank of India (RBI) to conduct banking operations in the country and was renamed as Kotak Mahindra Bank, the parent company of Kotak Life Insurance. The company started operations in 2001 on a joint venture between Kotak Mahindra Bank Ltd and Old Mutual Plc.

In 2017, Kotak Mahindra Bank bought Old Mutual's 26 percent stake in the life insurance joint venture for Rs 1,293 crore, subject to approvals, making the life insurance company fully owned by Kotak Mahindra Group.

Kotak Life Insurance has various plans, including health insurance, as of 2020.

Kotak Life Insurance has implemented some CSR projects. These include free breast cancer screenings.

== See also ==
- Kotak Mahindra Bank
- Kotak Mahindra General Insurance
- Kotak Mutual Fund
