= Ashok Vaswani =

Indian banker

- Born: 1962 (age 63–64); India
- Education: (BCom) Sydenham College of Commerce and Economics; University of Mumbai (CA) ICAI (CS) ICSI (Exec.) Stanford Graduate School of Business
- Occupations: Business executive, banker
- Known for: CEO of Kotak Mahindra Bank
- Spouse: Veena Vaswani
- Children: 1

Ashok Vaswani is an Indian business executive and banker who is serving as the MD and CEO of Kotak Mahindra Bank since 1 January 2024. Previously, he has worked at Citigroup and Barclays.

== Education ==
Vaswani completed his under graduation with a BCom degree in Economics, and Accountancy from the Sydenham College of Commerce and Economics of Bombay University. He completed his chartered accountancy degree (CA) from Institute of Chartered Accountants of India and Company Secretary (CS) from Institute of Company Secretaries of India.

He completed his Executive Education (Exec.) from Stanford Graduate School of Business in California, USA.

== Career ==
Vaswani spent twenty years with Citigroup starting in India and then moved to Barclays.

At Barclays Bank, UK, he worked as CEO of the Global Consumer, Private, Corporate and Payments businesses of the bank. He has also worked as a member of the group executive committee. Vaswani served as the president of Pagaya Technologies from July 2022 to January 2024.

In 2024, he joined as CEO for Kotak Mahindra Bank, India.

== Personal life ==
Vaswani is married to Veena and they have one daughter, who double majored in Economics and Psychology at Columbia University as summa cum laude and did her MBA at Harvard.
