= Yasmin Surveyor =

Indian academic, banker, and social worker

Yasmin Khurshedji Surveyor was an Indian academic, banker, and social worker who is recognized as Asia’s first woman commerce graduate. She graduated from Sydenham College, Mumbai in 1925 at a time when participation of women in higher education, especially in commerce, was extremely rare.

== Early life and education ==
Surveyor pursued a degree in commerce at Sydenham College, Mumbai. Among her teachers was the young Dr. B. R. Ambedkar, who later became a key figure in India’s social reform and constitutional history.

== Career ==
Following her graduation, Yasmin Surveyor broke another barrier by joining the Central Bank of India as its first female employee. She worked in banking at a time when very few women were employed in the sector.

After retirement, Surveyor volunteered at the Ratan Tata Institute, dedicating her time to the welfare of women and children. She remained active in social causes into her eighties.

== Legacy ==
Surveyor’s achievements are regarded as milestones in Indian social history, paving the way for women’s entry into higher education and professional fields such as banking. Her life and legacy are celebrated by Sydenham College and recognized by academics and historians as a turning point in women’s empowerment in India and Asia.
