= Yogesh Kumar Sanan =

Indian bodybuilder (born 1964)

Yogesh Sanan (born 6 September 1964) is an Indian bodybuilder. He was a participant in Sr. Mr. Asia held in Indonesia and China in 1991 and 1995 respectively. He is 9-time Mr. India Gold Medalist. Sanan was also a North India Gold medalist in 1987 and 4-time all India inter university champion.

Sanan was born in Batala, Punjab. He started training in bodybuilding in 1980 under well-known trainer Dr. Randhir Kumar. At present besides bodybuilding, he is also doing services in Indian railway.
