= Parachute (brand) =

Indian hair care company

- Product type: Hair products
- Current owner: Marico
- Produced by: Marico
- Country: India
- Markets: Asia
- Previous owners: Bombay Oil Industries
- Website: www.parachutegold.com www.parachuteadvansed.com

Parachute is a brand name for a range of coconut-based oil manufactured by Marico.

== History ==
Parachute is the flagship brand of Marico. Before the 1992 economic liberalisation in India, the government classified vegetable oils as an essential commodity.

In the late 1990s, Marico made its first serious entry into foreign markets by setting up a manufacturing plant in Bangladesh. Parachute's market share rose to 70% within ten years.

== Products ==
Marico makes two kinds of coconut oil, Parachute edible grade hair oil, and Parachute Advansed Hair oil.

Parachute edible oil contains 100% coconut oil, whereas Advansed hair oil contains coconut oil along with fragrance and Vitamin E.
