= League tables (finance) =

Rankings of companies

League tables are rankings of companies according to sets of criteria like revenue, earnings, deals, etc. The rankings can be used for investment research or promotionally.
