= Trubshaw =

Trubshaw or Trubshawe is a family name, and may refer to:

== People ==
- Brian Trubshaw (1924–2001), British test pilot
- Charles Trubshaw (1841–1917), English architect
- Gwendoline Trubshaw (1887–1954), Welsh public sector official
- James Trubshaw (1777–1853), British architect and civil engineer
- Michael Trubshawe (1905–1985), British actor
- Roy Trubshaw (born 1959), computer specialist
- Wilfred Trubshaw (died 1944), British solicitor and police officer

== Fictional characters ==
- Nicholas Anthony Kemble in Eric Malpass's novel Oh My Darling Daughter (1970), commonly referred to as Trubshaw
- Chief-Inspector Eustace Trubshawe, in two whodunits by Gilbert Adair, The Act of Roger Murgatroyd (2006) and A Mysterious Affair of Style (2007)
