= Ashok V. Desai =

Indian economist

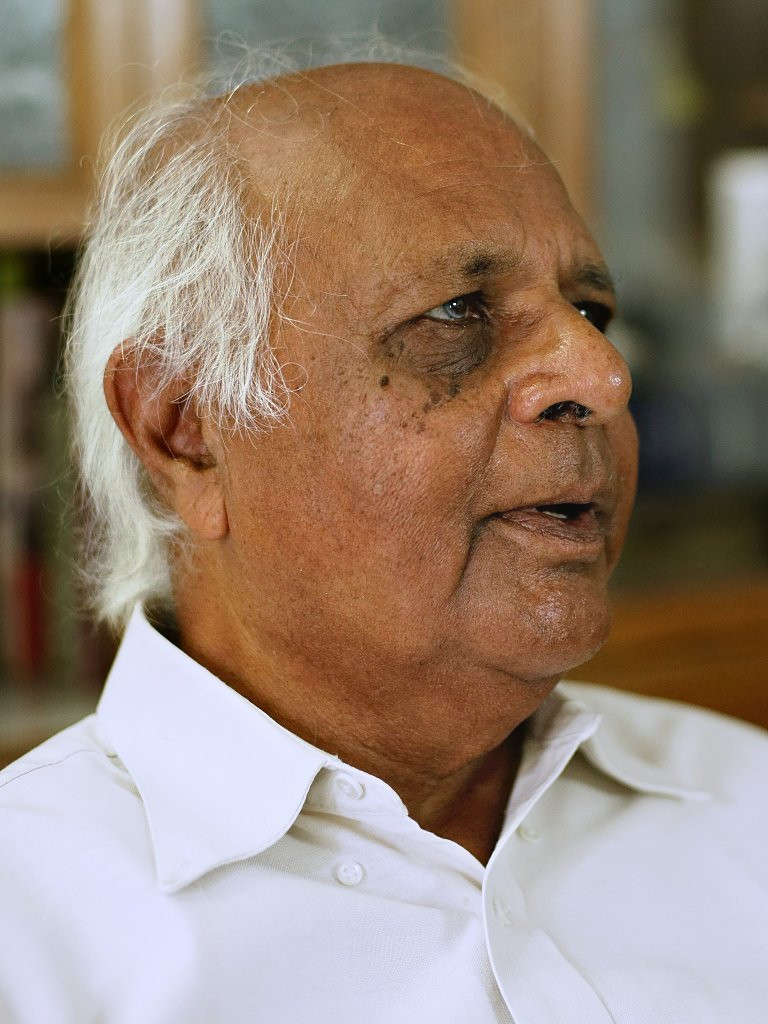
- Ashok Desai
- Born: 1936 (age 89–90); India
- Citizenship: Indian
- Occupations: Professor; Economist

Academic background
- Education: (BCom) Sydenham College of Commerce and Economics; University of Mumbai (B.A.) (PhD) University of Cambridge
- Thesis: Real Wages in Germany 1871–1913
- Doctoral advisor: Phyllis Deane

Academic work
- Institutions: Stanford University; University of Oxford; Delhi School of Economics; University of South Pacific; University of Sussex

Ashok V. Desai, (born 1936), is an Indian economist. He has served as Chief Consultant in the Ministry of Finance from 1991 to 1993, and helped overcome India from economic crisis and design the early reforms. His inputs in the reform of taxation, trade policy and financial market regulation were particularly notable. In recent years Desai has carried out major studies of the Indian information technology and telecommunications industries. In the 1980s, Desai coordinated a large survey of research on energy and environment for International Development Research Centre in Ottawa.

== Education and Career ==
He graduated from Sydenham College, Bombay University, with a BCom, proceeded to King's College, Cambridge for a BA in Economics where Nicholas Kaldor was his supervisor; his student contemporaries included Jagdish Bhagwati and Manmohan Singh.

He received the PhD in Economics of Cambridge University in 1963 for a thesis on German economic growth before World War I, titled "Real Wages in Germany 1871–1913", done under supervision of Phyllis Deane.

He has been a noted economic journalist and private business consultant in India, and was also Chief Consultant in the Indian Ministry of Finance in 1991–1993 under Manmohan Singh's ministership.
