= Yogesh Mahansaria =

Yogesh Mahansaria is the founder and CEO of multinational Alliance Tire Group headquartered in India.

== Early years ==
Yogesh was born in Mumbai India. He completed his graduation in B.Com. from Sydenham College, Mumbai.

== Balkrishna Tyres ==
Yogesh joined his family business Balkrishna Tyres while he was still studying in 1993. On 8 July 2006 Yogesh along with his father Ashok Mahansaria exited from the family business of Balkrishna Tyres.

== Alliance Tire group ==
In the year 2007 Yogesh and his father Ashok bought an Israeli tyre company Alliance Tire and started next leg of his own business. Yogesh set up manufacturing plant in Tirunelveli Tamil Nadu India and bought US company GPX under his Alliance Tire Group.

2014

- EY Entrepreneur of the year - Manufacturing 2014

== Interests ==
Yogesh enjoy reading and collecting cars, pens and watches
