= Ashwin Choksi =

Indian businessman

- Born: 1944; Mumbai, India
- Died: 19 September 2018
- Education: Sydenham College (M.Com)
- Occupation: Businessman
- Title: Non-executive chairman, Asian Paints Ltd
- Spouse: Married
- Children: 2

Ashwin Chimanlal Choksi (1944 – 19 September 2018) was an Indian billionaire businessman and the non-executive chairman of Asian Paints Ltd, India's largest paint company. He was among the top 100 richest Indians.

== Early life ==
Ashwin Choksi was born in 1944 in Mumbai. His father Chimanlal Choksi was one of the co-founders of Asian Paints. Choksi completed his master's in commerce from Sydenham College, Mumbai.

== Career ==
Choksi joined the family business Asian Paints in 1965. He became managing director and executive chairman, and a non-executive director of Berger International.

On 19 September 2018, Choksi died after a brief illness.

== Family ==
Choksi was married with two children, Ashish Choksi and Rupen Choksi, and they lived in Mumbai.
