= Nihar =

Nihar (lit. 'mist, fog, dew') may refer to

- Nihar Ameen, Indian swimming coach
- Nihar Mukherjee, Indian politician
- Nihar Ranjan Gupta, Indian dermatologist and novelist
- Nihar Ranjan Laskar, Indian politician
- Nihar Christison, philanthropist and whipped cream entrepreneur

== See also ==
- Niharika (disambiguation), the feminine form of the name
