= Kotak Mahindra Bank =

Indian private sector bank

- Kotak Mahindra Bank logo
- Type: Public
- Traded as: BSE: 500247; NSE: KOTAKBANK; BSE SENSEX constituent; NSE NIFTY 50 constituent
- ISIN: INE237A01028
- Industry: Financial services
- Founded: 1985; 41 years ago
- Founders: Uday Kotak
- Headquarters: Mumbai, Maharashtra, India
- Key people: Uday Kotak (non-executive director); Ashok Vaswani (MD & CEO)
- Products: Consumer banking; Commercial banking; Insurance; Credit cards; Investment banking; Mortgage loans; Private banking; Private equity; Investment management; Asset management; Wealth management; Stockbroking
- Revenue: ▲₹107,000 crore (US$11 billion) (2026)
- Operating income: ▲₹26,450 crore (US$2.8 billion) (2026)
- Net income: ▲₹19,288 crore (US$2.1 billion) (2026)
- Total assets: ▲₹1,003,353 crore (US$110 billion) (2026)
- Total equity: ▲₹154,200 crore (US$16 billion) (2026)
- Number of employees: 112,143 (2026)
- Subsidiaries: Kotak Mahindra General Insurance; Kotak Life Insurance; Kotak Mutual Fund; Kotak Securities; Kotak Mahindra Prime
- Website: www.kotak.bank.in

Kotak Mahindra Bank Limited is an Indian banking and financial services company headquartered in Mumbai. It provides services such as banking, securities, asset management, insurance and lending.

Kotak Mahindra started in 1985 as a firm that was engaged in discounting of bills. In 2003, it received a banking license from the RBI, becoming one of the first non-banking finance companies to convert to a bank. In 2014, it merged with the ING Vysya Bank. As of December 2023, the bank has about 2,000 branches and 3,239 ATMs, including branches in GIFT City, DIFC (Dubai) and London.

== History ==
=== 1985–2002: Kotak Mahindra Finance ===
In 1985, Uday Kotak founded Kotak Capital Management Finance Limited as a financial services company with a loan of ₹30 lakh from family and friends. In 1986, Anand Mahindra and his father Harish Mahindra invested ₹1 lakh in the company which was subsequently renamed Kotak Mahindra Finance. The company was initially engaged in bill discounting, along with lease and hire purchase activities.

In the early 1990s, the company started offering car financing and investment banking services and expanded its operations overseas. In 1996, car financing company Kotak Mahindra Primus was incorporated as a 60:40 joint venture between Kotak Mahindra Finance and Ford Credit International. In the same year, Kotak Mahindra Finance hived off its investment banking division into a new company, Kotak Mahindra Capital, started in partnership with Goldman Sachs.

In 1998, Kotak Mahindra Finance started its mutual fund arm called Kotak Mahindra AMC. In 2001, OM Kotak Mahindra Life Insurance was established as a 74:26 joint venture between Kotak Mahindra Finance and Old Mutual.

=== 2003–present: Kotak Mahindra Bank ===
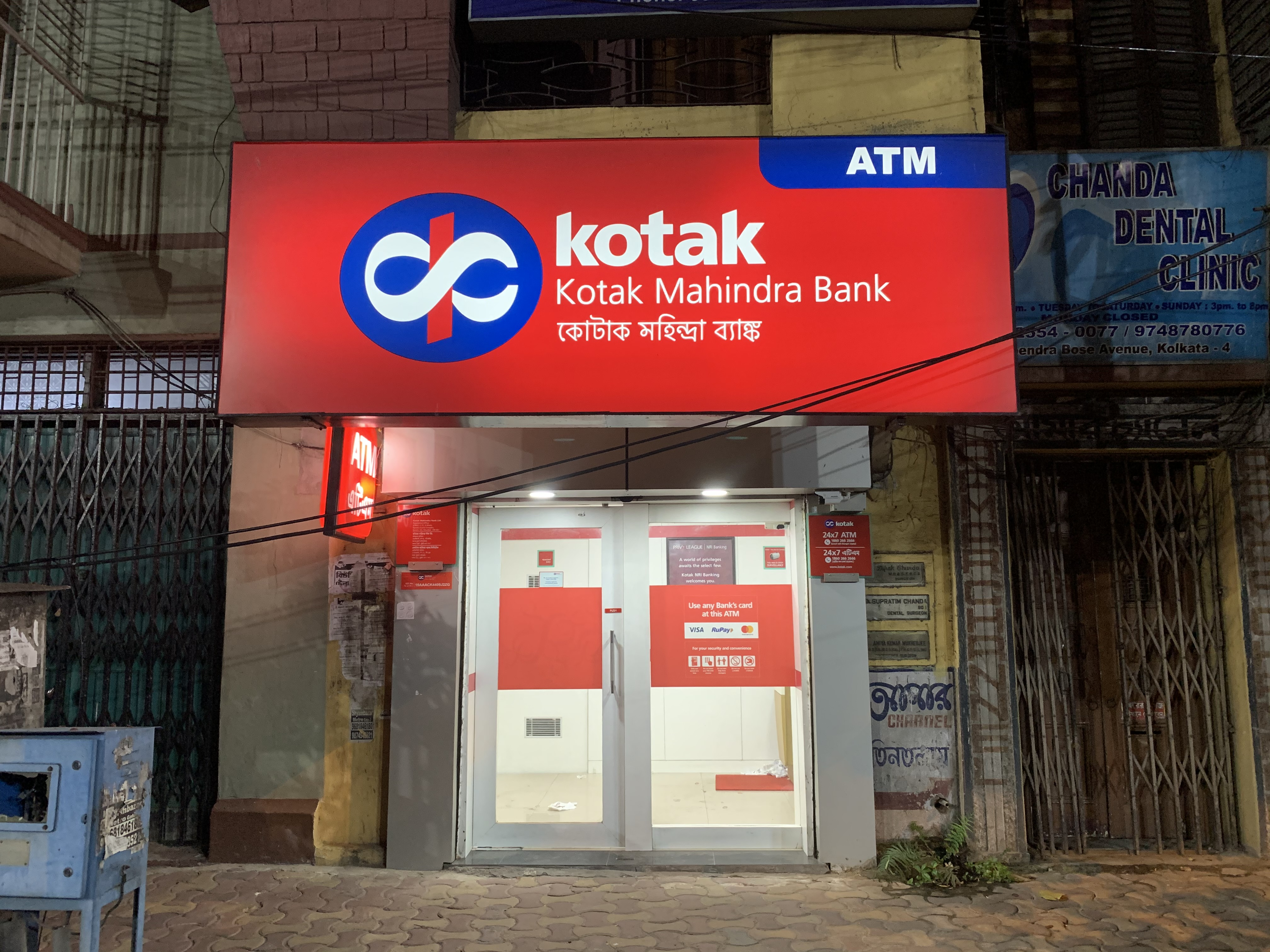
A Kotak Mahindra Bank ATM in Kolkata.

In February 2003, Kotak Mahindra Finance received a banking licence from the Reserve Bank of India, becoming India's first non-banking finance company to be converted into a bank. Kotak Mahindra Finance was then renamed Kotak Mahindra Bank. At the time, Uday Kotak had a 56% stake in the company while Anand Mahindra held a 5% stake.

In 2005, Kotak Mahindra Bank acquired Ford Credit's 40% stake in Kotak Mahindra Primus, making it a wholly owned subsidiary of the group. Kotak Mahindra Primus was subsequently renamed as Kotak Mahindra Prime. In 2006, Kotak Mahindra Bank bought out Goldman Sachs' 25% stake in Kotak Mahindra Capital for ₹210 crore (US$46.35 million) and 25% in Kotak Securities for ₹123 crore (US$27.15 million), turning both companies into its wholly owned subsidiaries.

In 2014, Kotak Mahindra Bank acquired a 15% stake in Multi Commodity Exchange (MCX) from Financial Technologies Group for ₹459 crore (US$75.21 million) to become the company's largest shareholder.

In 2014, Kotak Mahindra Bank announced the acquisition of ING Vysya Bank in a deal valued at ₹15,000 crore (US$2.34 billion). With the merger completed in 2015, Kotak Mahindra Bank had almost 40,000 employees, and the number of branches reached 1,261. After the merger, ING Group, which controlled ING Vysya Bank, obtained a 6.5% stake in Kotak Mahindra Bank.

In 2015, Kotak Mahindra General Insurance, a wholly owned subsidiary of Kotak Mahindra Bank, started operations after receiving IRDAI's approval. In 2016, Bharti Airtel and Kotak Mahindra Bank started an 80:20 joint venture called Airtel Payments Bank.

In 2016, Kotak Mahindra Bank acquired BSS Microfinance for ₹139.2 crore (US$20.72 million).

In March 2017, Kotak Mahindra Bank launched an online savings account called Kotak 811, named after the date Prime Minister Narendra Modi had announced demonetisation in the previous year (8 November), which according to Uday Kotak was "the day that changed India." Kotak 811 helped the bank double its number of customers by September 2018.

In April 2017, Kotak Mahindra Bank acquired Old Mutual's 26% stake in Kotak Mahindra Old Mutual Life Insurance for ₹1,292 crore (US$198.4 million), making the life insurance company its wholly owned subsidiary.

In 2021, Kotak Mahindra Bank sold its 8.57% stake in Airtel Payments Bank to Bharti Enterprises for ₹295 crore (US$39.81 million). In the same year, Kotak Mahindra Group acquired the vehicle financing portfolio of Volkswagen Finance India and passenger vehicle financing portfolio of Ford Credit India. In 2022, it acquired the agriculture and healthcare equipment financing portfolio of DLL India.

In 2023, Kotak Mahindra Bank acquired microfinancier Sonata Finance for ₹537 crore (US$57 million).

In February 2024, Zurich Insurance Group announced its acquisition of a 70% stake in Kotak Mahindra General Insurance for ₹5,560 crore (US$590 million).

== Subsidiaries and associates ==
Major subsidiaries of the Bank include

- Kotak Securities
- Kotak Mahindra Life Insurance
- Kotak Mahindra General Insurance
- Kotak Mutual Fund

== Recognition ==
In a study by Brand Finance Banking 500 published in February 2014 by Banker magazine, Kotak Mahindra Bank was ranked 245th among the world's top 500 banks with a brand valuation of around US$481 million and brand rating of AA+.

== Philanthropy ==
In 2020, Kotak pledged to donate ₹50 crore to the PM CARES Fund to fight against the COVID-19 pandemic in India.

== Controversies ==
In April 2024, the Reserve Bank of India barred Kotak Mahindra Bank from onboarding new customers via mobile banking, online channels, and issuing new credit cards. Existing customers were not affected. The RBI cited deficiencies in the bank's IT systems as the reason for this action.

On 12 February 2025, the Reserve Bank of India (RBI) announced the withdrawal of supervisory restriction imposed on Kotak Mahindra Bank on 24 April 2024 under Section 35A of the Banking Act, 1949.

The restrictions, which prohibited the bank from onboarding new customers through its online and mobile banking channels and issuing fresh credit cards, were lifted following remedial measure undertaken by the bank to address the supervisory concerns raised by the RBI.

The bank submitted compliance reports and commissioned an external audit, with prior approval from the RBI, to validate the implementation of the required corrective measure. After examining the submission and remedial actions, the RBI determined that the restriction could be withdrawn.

The decision restored Kotak Mahindra Bank's ability to onboard new customers through its digital banking platform and issue fresh credit cards.

On 25 March 2026, during a broader probe into the Haryana Government accounts fraud, a discrepancy was uncovered at Kotak Mahindra Bank’s Sector-11 Panchkula branch involving Panchkula Municipal Corporation’s fixed deposits. When officials requested a transfer from a maturing deposit, reconciliation revealed ₹150 crore missing including a ₹58 crore deposit the bank said did not exist.

As of August 2026, a luxury car trail surfaced in Kotak Mahindra Bank fraud case. Enforcement Directorate opined that the diverted funds were used to buy premium vehicles, watches and other high value assets. Under the PMLA act, they officials of the bank were found guilty, and the ED has attached assets worth Rs. 131.13 crore. Luxury vehicles such as Porsche, Land Cruiser, BMW and Harley-Davidson with the siphoned funds. The vehicles were then sold off when the fraud was detected.

== See also ==
- Banking in India
- List of banks in India
- Indian Financial System Code
