= Nanabhai Haridas =

Indian judge (1832–1889)

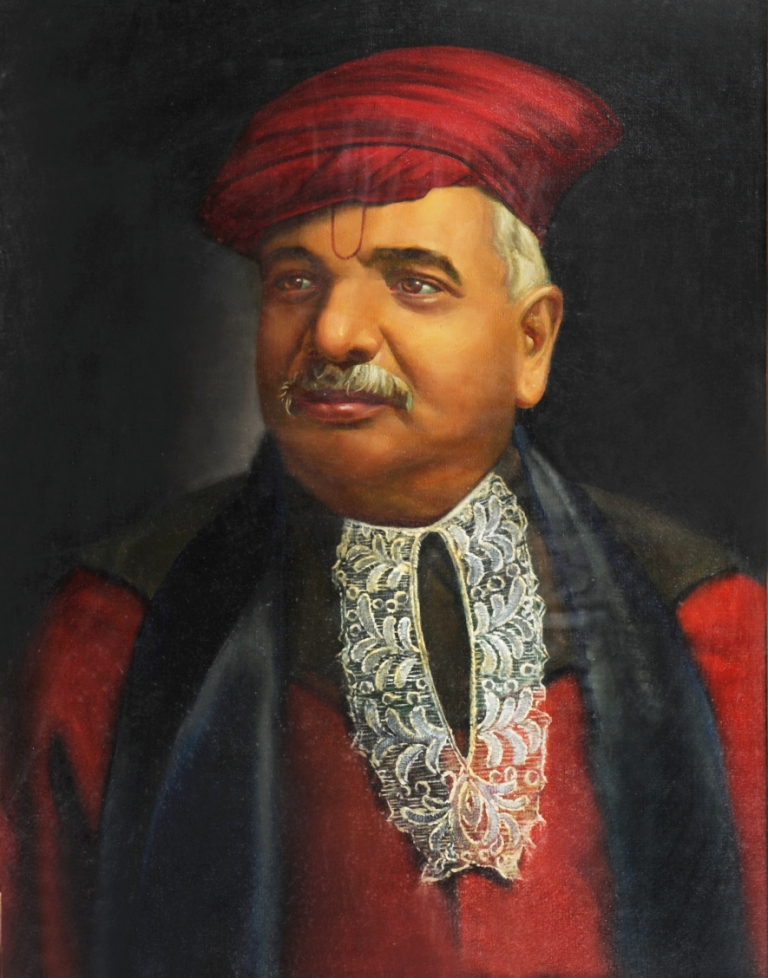
- Born: 5 September 1832; Surat
- Died: June 1889 (aged 56)
- Children: 6 sons and one daughter

Philosophical work
- Era: British India

Justice Nanabhai Haridas LL.B. (1832–1889), was the first Indian judge of the Bombay High Court during 1883–1889.

== Career ==
Haridas, son of a government official, began his career as a translator in 1852. He joined the law class of Elphinstone Institute in 1855 and passed the examination as munsif. In 1857, he successfully completed the final law examinations and for two years, from 1859 to 1861, the Bombay government engaged his services to translate the Indian civil and criminal laws into Gujarati. Also in 1857, he was enrolled as a lawyer of the Civil Court. When the Bombay High Court was established, he was admitted as a lawyer on appellate side. He passed the vakeel's examination at Madras in 1863, whereafter he resigned his government job and set up practice in the Bombay High Court. In 1869, he passed the LLB examination and in 1877 was appointed government pleader and 'acting' government law professor.

Between 1873 and 1884, Haridas acted as temporary judge nine times. However another pleader Jagannath Wassudewji, who was in subordinate judicial service, was appointed acting judge before him. He became the first Indian permanent Judge of the Bombay High Court with a salary of Rs. 3,750 per month from 1884.

He held the office of judge till his death in 1889. He had great knowledge of Hindu law; and some of his judgements are among the earliest expositions of important principles of Hindu Law.

During his life, he was a Kayastha and later he adopted Pushtimarg as a follower of fifth house of shuddhadvaita.

He had also written novels and founded schools and libraries.
