= Yogesh Joshi =

Yogesh Joshi may refer to:

- Yogesh Joshi (poet) (born 1955), Gujarati language poet and author
- Yogesh M. Joshi (born 1974), Indian chemical engineer
- Yogesh Kumar Joshi (born 1962), Indian Army general
- Yogesh Vinayan Joshi, Indian screenwriter, co-writer of the 2008 film Mumbai Meri Jaan
