= Marico =

Indian consumer goods company

- Type: Public
- Traded as: BSE: 531642; NSE: MARICO
- Industry: Consumer goods
- Founded: 2 April 1990; 36 years ago
- Founder: Harsh Mariwala
- Headquarters: Santacruz, Mumbai, Maharashtra, India
- Area served: Worldwide
- Key people: Harsh Mariwala (Chairman); Saugata Gupta (MD & CEO)
- Products: Personal care; Skin care; Convenience food
- Brands: Saffola; Nihar; Livon; Set Wet; Parachute
- Revenue: ▲₹10,831 crore (US$1.1 billion) (2025)
- Operating income: ▲₹2,139 crore (US$220 million) (2025)
- Net income: ▲₹1,629 crore (US$170 million) (2025)
- Total assets: ▲₹8,338 crore (US$870 million) (2025)
- Total equity: ▲₹4,266 crore (US$440 million) (2025)
- Number of employees: 1,631 (2020)
- Subsidiaries: Kaya Limited; Saffola; Set Wet
- Website: www.marico.com
- Footnotes; Financials as of 31 March 2025.

Marico Limited is an Indian multinational consumer goods company, headquartered in Mumbai. Marico is present in over 25 countries across Asia and Africa. It owns brands in categories of hair care, skin care, edible oils, health foods, male grooming, and fabric care.

Marico has 8 factories in India located at Puducherry, Perundurai, Kanjikode, Jalgaon, Paldhi, Dehradun, Baddi and Paonta Sahib. Founder Harsh Mariwala is the chairman, while Saugata Gupta has been the MD and CEO since March 2014.

== History ==
Marico Limited was established on 13 October 1988 under the name of Marico Foods Limited. Later, in 1989 the name of the company was changed from Marico Foods Limited to Marico Industries Limited. The first international office for Marico was set up in Dubai in 1992. Marico was listed on the Indian stock exchange in 1996.

Timeline

- 1974 – Harsh Mariwala set up a branded national distribution network for Parachute.
- 1990 – Marico was established in India.
- 1991 – Marico launched Hair & Care, a non-sticky hair oil. Sweekar sunflower oil went national.
- 1992 – Marico established its first overseas office in Dubai.
- 1994 – Revive cold water starch is marketed.
- 1996 – Marico is listed on the Indian stock exchanges.
- 1999 – The company expanded with its first overseas manufacturing facility in Bangladesh. Marico acquired Mediker in the same year.
- 2003 – Marico Innovation Foundation, responsible for executing the Corporate Social Responsibility of Marico was formed. In the same year Marico set up copra collection centres to procure directly from farmers.
- 2006 – Nihar entered the Marico fold.
- 2006-7 – Marico acquired Fiancée and Hair Code in Egypt and Caivil, Black Chic and Hercules in South Africa.
- 2009 – Marico made a public offering of equity in Bangladesh.
- 2010 – Marico launched Saffola breakfast, Masala Oats in India.
- 2011 – Parachute Advanced entered the skin-care category with the launch of Parachute Advanced Body Lotion (PABL). It launched Parachute Gold hair cream in the Middle East market and acquired a male grooming, skin care and food portfolio in Vietnam the same year.
- 2012 – It launched its male grooming brand, SetWet.
- 2017– Marico acquired South African hair styling business Isoplus; launched Saffola Active Slimming Nutri-shake. It acquired a 45% stake in Zed Lifestyle (Beardo)
- 2018 – Marico invested in Revolutionary Fitness (Revofit); launched a new brand called True Roots and launched its first digital brand Studio X; launched Saffola Fittify.
- 2019 – Marico announced association with Kaya to create a skincare sub-brand, Kaya Youth.

== Brands ==
The organisation holds a number of brands such as Parachute, Parachute Advanced, Saffola, Hair & Care, Nihar, Nihar Naturals, Livon, Set Wet, Mediker and Revive. In the international market, Marico is represented by brands like Parachute, HairCode, Fiancée, Caivil, Hercules, Black Chic, Code 10, Ingwe, X-Men and Thuan Phat.

- Male grooming – Set Wet, Beardo, Parachute Advansed Men Aftershower Hair Cream
- Hair Care – Parachute, Parachute Advansed, Nihar Naturals, Nihar Naturals Uttam, Hair & Care Fruit Oils, Mediker, Livon
- Edible Oils – Saffola Oil, Parachute Coconut Oil
- Skin Care – Parachute Advansed Body Lotion
- Fabric Care – Revive
- Healthy Foods – Saffola Masala Oats & Saffola Fittify

=== Parachute ===
Parachute is the flagship brand of Marico which consists of edible grade coconut oil. Marico manufactures and markets its coconut based hair oils under its brand – Parachute "Advanced".

=== Others ===
Saffola is a brand of blended refined edible oil. It is marketed under the names of New Saffola, Tasty and Active. The main type of oils which are blended include rice bran oil, Kardi oil or safflower oil, corn oil and soya oil.

Marico has a significant presence in Bangladesh, South East Asia, Middle East, Egypt and South Africa. In Bangladesh, Marico operates through Marico Bangladesh Limited, a wholly owned subsidiary. Its manufacturing facility is located at Shirirchala, in Dhaka Division.

=== Mineral oil in hair oil ===
Parachute "Advanced" hair oils contain around 50% (v/v) to 80% (v/v) mineral oil, along with coconut oil. Advanced Aloe Vera Enriched Coconut Hair Oil contains: Coconut oil (50% v/v), Mineral l (49.6% v/v), BHT, Aloe Vera extract & Perfume.

Mineral oil is known to cause skin cancer. Even though highly refined oils (classified as Group 3) are not suspected to be carcinogenic, available information is not sufficient to classify them as harmless.

== Shareholding Pattern ==
Shareholding pattern
Shareholders (as on 30 June 2024)	Shareholding
Promoter and promoter group	59.28%
Total Institutions	35.71%
Total Non Institutions	5.01%
Total	100.0%

== Marketing ==
NRI in the Middle East had been smuggling Parachute oil with them for their daily use when export of the oil was restricted prior to the 1991 economic liberalisation. Marico decided to try to sell products in that market after liberalisation, but found out that the Arab customers did not like the scent of coconut, wanted a less sticky hair product, and needed a product to counteract the high level of chlorination in their water. When Marico reformulated its product, its market share in the Middle East grew from 2% in 2002 to more than 20% by 2008.
