= Zamin Ferrous =

Indian mining company

Zamin Ferrous is a privately owned mining company owned and run by the Indian former billionaire, Pramod Agarwal.

Zamin operates and owns iron ore mines. These mines are operated in the countries of Uruguay and Brazil. The company provides direct reduction and iron ore pellet fines to the steel industry world-wide.

Zamin is in a protracted legal dispute with Eurasian Natural Resources Corporation over a Bahia, Brazil iron ore mine.
