= Uday Kotak =

Indian banker and businessman

Uday Suresh Kotak
- Born: 15 March 1959 (age 67); Mumbai, India
- Education: University of Mumbai
- Occupations: Founder, former MD & CEO of Kotak Mahindra Bank; Chairman of IL&FS
- Board member of: Kotak Mahindra Bank
- Spouse: Pallavi Kotak
- Children: 2

Uday Suresh Kotak (born 15 March 1959) is an Indian banker and founder of Kotak Mahindra Bank, where he is a non-executive director. He resigned from his CEO position in September 2023. His son, Jay Kotak, is the co-head of the bank's digital banking app, 811.

In the early 1980s, while India was still a closed economy with slow economic growth, Kotak decided to start on his own, turning down a lucrative job offer from a multinational corporation. Over the next few years, he diversified his business into various areas of financial services, establishing a prominent presence in bills discounting, stockbroking, investment banking, car finance, life insurance and mutual funds.

In March 2003, Kotak Mahindra Finance Ltd. became the first company to receive a banking license from Reserve Bank of India. In 2006, he and Goldman Sachs ended their 14-year partnership when Goldman Sachs sold their 25% stake in two subsidiaries for $72 million to Kotak. Bloomberg Billionaires Index estimated his wealth to be US$14.8 billion as of April 2021.

In October 2024, Kotak was ranked 18th on the Forbes list of India's 100 richest tycoons, with a net worth of $14.1 billion.

As per Forbes list of The Richest People In The World, dated 8 March 2024 Uday Kotak ranked #148 with a net worth of $13.3 billion.

He was honoured with the Special Jury award at the EY Entrepreneur award ceremony in February 2026, for his contributions to the Indian banking and financial services industry.

== Early life and education ==
Uday Kotak was born in Mumbai on 15 March 1959 to an upper-middle-class Gujarati Hindu Lohana family that engaged in cotton trading. He grew up in a large joint family in a home with 60 people living under one roof. He called this "Capitalism at work and Socialism at home". His two pastimes were cricket and playing the sitar. In a 2014 interview with NDTV, he admitted that he was no longer playing the sitar. His talent in mathematics influenced his choice of career. He earned a Bachelor of Commerce degree from Sydenham College and completed a Master in Management Studies degree in 1982 from Jamnalal Bajaj Institute of Management Studies.

== Career ==
After completing his MBA, Kotak started Kotak Capital Management Finance Ltd (which later became Kotak Mahindra Finance Ltd). From a seed capital of less than US$80,000 borrowed from family and friends, he converted a bill-discounting start-up into a financial services conglomerate with assets of US$68 billion (as of March 2022), and the third largest private sector bank by market capitalization in India with over 1752 branches.

During 2014, Kotak almost doubled his wealth as shares of his Kotak Mahindra Bank hit an all-time high after he sealed a $2.4 billion deal in November 2014 for rival ING Vysya Bank, partly owned by Dutch financial services group ING. In 2015, Kotak entered the general insurance business and is partnering with telecom magnate Sunil Mittal's Bharti Airtel to start a small payments bank. Kotak has reduced his stake in the Kotak Mahindra Bank to 30% as of now, as he is required to bring it down to 20% as per RBI directions.

In August 2019 he was reported to be one of the most highly paid CEOs of any Indian bank with a monthly salary of ₹27 lakh (US$28,000). He took over as President of the Confederation of Indian Industry (CII) for the year 2020-21. In August 2023, it was announced that Kotak's alternate fund management and investment advisory businesses would be combined into one entity called Kotak Alternate Asset Managers (KAAM). It was reported that the entity would have $18 billion in assets under management, making it the largest asset management entity in India.

== Honours and awards ==
- In June 2014, he was named Ernst & Young World Entrepreneur Of The Year.
- In 2015 he won the 'Business Leader of the Year Award' by Economic Times.
- He was the sole Indian Financier to feature in Money Masters: The Most Powerful People in The Financial World, by Forbes magazine, US (May 2016).
- India Today magazine ranked him #8th in India's 50 Most Powerful People of 2017 list.
- In 2018, he won the USIBC Global Leadership Award.
- In 2026, he was honoured with Padma Bhushan award.

== Memberships ==
Kotak is a member of the Government of India's High-Level Committee on Financing Infrastructure, the Primary Market Advisory Committee of the Securities & Exchange Board of India, Member of the Board of Governors of the National Institute of Securities Markets and the Indian Council for Research on International Economic Relations (ICRIER). He is also Governing Member of the UWC Mahindra College, and a Member of the National Council of the Confederation of Indian Industry (CII). Kotak is also a member of the strategic board which advises the national law firm, Cyril Amarchand Mangaldas. From 2015 to 2024, he was the first chairperson of the board of the Indian Institute of Management Bodh Gaya.

== Personal life ==
He is married to Pallavi Kotak, has two children and lives in Mumbai.
