= Government Law College, Mumbai =

Law college in Mumbai, Maharastha, India

- शासकीय विधी महाविद्यालय, मुंबई (Marathi) शासकीय विधि महाविद्यालय, मुंबई (Hindi)
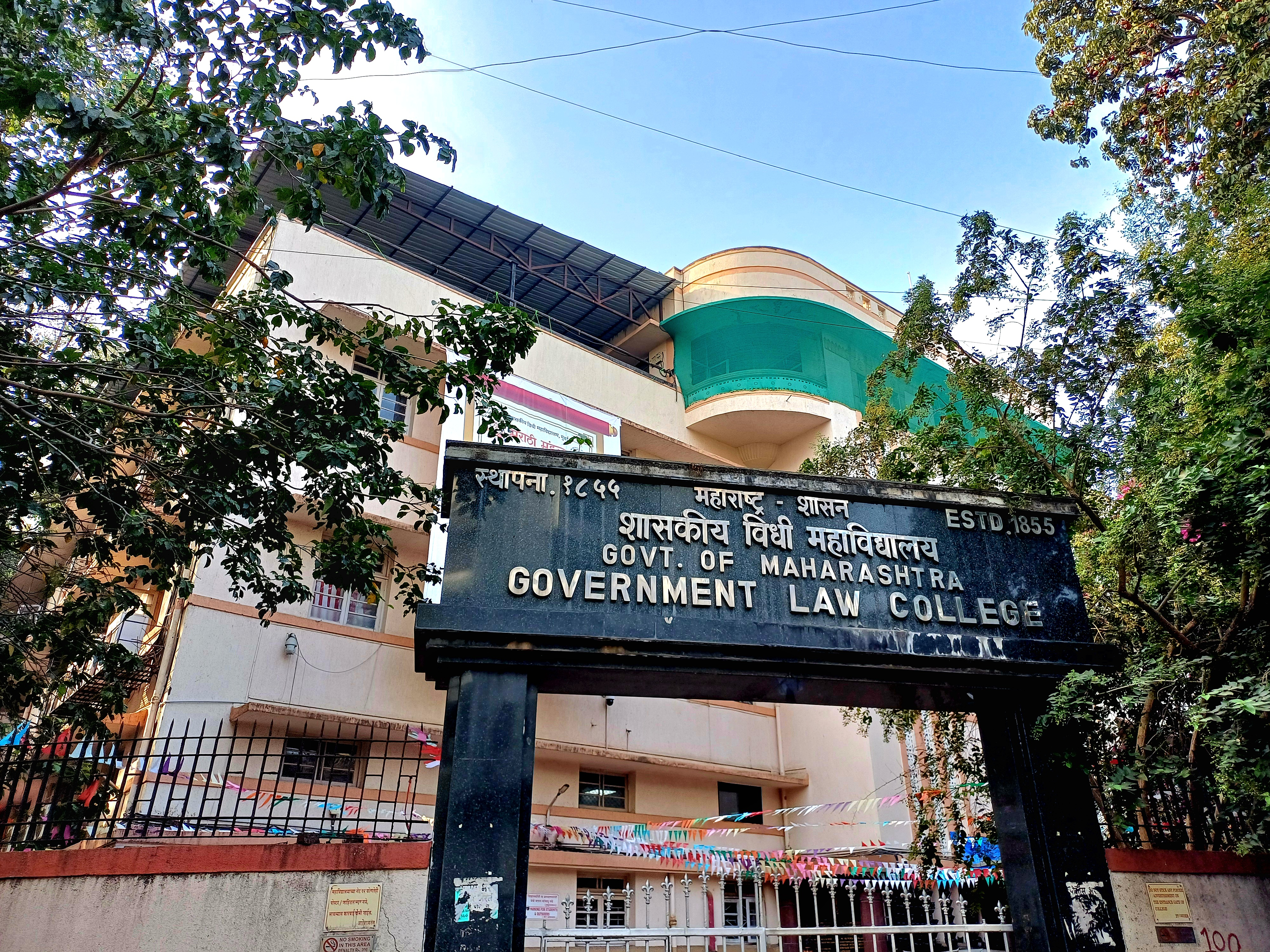
- Entrance to the college
- Other name: GLC Mumbai
- Former name: Government Law School (1855-1925)
- Motto: Ne Vile Fano (Latin)
- Motto in English: Let No Evil Enter
- Type: Public law college
- Established: 1855; 171 years ago
- Founders: Hon. Jagannath Shankarseth; Sir Thomas Erskine Perry
- Parent institution: University of Mumbai
- Affiliations: University of Mumbai; Bar Council of India
- Principal: Dr. Asmita Adwait Vaidya
- Academic staff: approx. 25
- Administrative staff: approx. 15
- Students: approx. 2,220
- Location: Mumbai, Maharashtra, India; 18.9331°N 72.8256°E
- Campus: Urban, approx. 1 acre (0.4 ha)
- Colors
- Website: www.glcmumbai.com

The Government Law College, Mumbai, (GLC Mumbai), India, is a public law school located in Churchgate, Mumbai in Maharashtra. Founded in 1855, it is the oldest law school in Asia. The college, affiliated to the University of Mumbai, is run by the Government of Maharashtra.

The college offers the five-years integrated undergraduate law degree i.e., the B.A. LL.B., a three-years post-graduate law course i.e., the LL.B., a post-graduate law degree i.e., the LL.M., and a Ph.D. in Law through its Research Centre. The college also delivers post-graduate diplomas and certificate courses.

Bal Gangadhar Tilak, Pratibha Patil, the former President of India, and six Chief Justices of India, as well as several judges of the Supreme Court of India and other High Courts of the country are alumni of the college. Dr. B.R. Ambedkar, served as the Principal of the College from 1935, until 1937.

== History ==
=== Founding ===
Prior to the 1850s, India had no formal institution dedicated to legal education. Sir Thomas Erskine Perry, then Chief Justice of the Supreme Court of Judicature at Bombay from 1847 to 1852, delivered informal lectures on law after court hours to a small circle of practitioners and officials, but this arrangement offered no structured or regularised training. The main purpose of these lectures was to create a handful of natives who could assist the British administration with basic administrative and legal work.

It was only in 1852, when Sir Perry left for England, that a chair in jurisprudence, named the Perry Professorship of Jurisprudence was established at the Elphinstone Institution at Fort, Mumbai. This chair in jurisprudence ultimately transformed to the Government Law School.

Established historical accounts hold that it is the first institution of its kind in India, though legal-education scholarship notes some disagreement over this claim relative to the Madras Law College, which was established as an independent institution in 1891, much after GLC Mumbai. What is not disputed is that the Government Law School, the earliest form of the college, was established in 1855 at the Elphinstone Institution, with its first course reportedly drawing more than 100 students.

The parallel codification of law elsewhere in India during this period further underscored the need for formal legal training. In Bombay, Governor Mountstuart Elphinstone championed the Elphinstone Code of 1827, a codification of civil and criminal procedure for the Bombay Presidency. Elsewhere in India, similar efforts produced the Civil Procedure Code (1859), the Indian Penal Code (1860), and the Indian Contract Act (1872). This broader movement toward codified, systematised law added further impetus to the establishment of formal legal education in India through institutions such as the Government Law College.

The college became affiliated with the University of Bombay in September 1860, roughly three years after the university itself was established. The college was one of the first five colleges to be affiliated with the University, others being Elphinstone College (affiliated in 1860, Grant Medical College (affiliated in 1860), Wilson College (affiliated in 1861), and St. Xavier's College (affiliated in 1869).

=== Transition to Full-Time Status ===
The college continued to operate as a part-time, evening institution for several decades from the Elphinstone Institution building. It was not until 1938 that it was converted to a full-time institution, at which point it was also allocated the plot of land opposite Churchgate railway station that it continues to occupy today.

=== Monopoly over Legal Education in Maharashtra ===
For nearly seven decades after its founding, Government Law College held an uninterrupted monopoly over formal legal education in the Bombay Presidency: from 1855 until 1924, it was the only law college in what is now Maharashtra. This changed in 1924, when the Indian Law Society established ILS Law College in Poona, initially affiliated, like GLC, to the University of Bombay.

ILS Law College remained under the University of Bombay's umbrella for the next quarter-century. That changed on 10 February 1949, when the University of Poona (now Savitribai Phule Pune University) was established under the Poona University Act, passed by the Bombay legislature the previous year. ILS Law College transferred its affiliation to the newly formed university, severing its link to the University of Bombay system.

With ILS Law College's departure from the University of Bombay system, Government Law College once again became the sole law college affiliated to the University of Bombay in the city; a position it held until 1955, when Kishinchand Chellaram (K. C.) Law College was founded in Churchgate by the Hyderabad (Sind) National Collegiate Board, an educational trust established by the Sindhi community that had relocated to Bombay following Partition.

The practical consequence of this history is notable: any lawyer who received a formal legal education at a law college in Bombay between 1855 and 1924, or between 1949 and 1955, did so at Government Law College, since it was, for those two extended periods, the only institution of its kind operating in the city.

=== Post-Independence Developments ===
Following India's independence in 1947, alumni of Government Law College played a foundational role in shaping the country's constitutional and judicial architecture. Dr. B. R. Ambedkar, who had taught at the college as a professor from 1928 and served as its Principal from 1935, was elected Chairman of the Drafting Committee of the Constituent Assembly on 29 August 1947, and steered the drafting of the Constitution of India to its adoption in 1949.

In the judiciary, Justice H. J. Kania, who had earned his LL.B. and LL.M. from the college in 1912 and 1913 respectively, was appointed the first Chief Justice of India in 1950, having earlier served as Chief Justice of the Federal Court of India from 1947.

== College Crest and Campus ==
=== Crest ===
The need for a formal college crest was felt in 1932–33, and its design was undertaken under the personal supervision of Captain W. E. Gladstone Solomon, then Director of the Sir J. J. School of Art, who headed the art school from 1919 to 1936.

The crest depicts the traditional blindfolded figure of Lady Justice, holding a sword and a set of scales; the sword denoting the relentlessness of the law, and the scales its impartiality. At her feet sits the crowned lion from the coat of arms of the old logo of the University of Bombay, an acknowledgement of the college's affiliation with the university. A banner above the shield carries a Sanskrit inscription, dharmo viśvasya jagataḥ pratiṣṭhā — a verse meaning "Dharma is the foundation of the entire world," which recurs across ancient Sanskrit literature, including the Karna Parva of the Mahabharata. The college's Latin motto, Ne Vile Fano which translated to "Let no evil enter" in English, appears on a separate banner beneath the shield.

=== Campus ===
The college occupies a site on 'A' Road, opposite Churchgate railway station in South Mumbai, allocated to it by the Government of Bombay in 1938 following its conversion to a full-time institution. The campus sits in close proximity to the Bombay High Court and the prominent downtown and central business district of Nariman Point which houses many legal institutions and prominent law firms and law chambers of the city.

The main college building is designed in the Art Deco style characteristic of the Churchgate and Marine Drive precinct, one of the largest collections of Art Deco architecture in the world. Its facade features curvilinear balconies, horizontal and vertical banding, and "eyebrows" — projecting horizontal ledges above the windows that shield the interior from Mumbai's monsoon rain and harsh sun, a device widely used in the city's Art Deco buildings of the 1930s.

Since 1988, the college has operated an annexe building alongside the original structure, housing additional classrooms and a reference library. A marble plaque commemorating B. R. Ambedkar is installed near the college's entrance, inside the building on the ground floor, and the Preamble to the Constitution of India is engraved in stone on the south facing wall at the entrance.

The campus includes a canteen, a basketball court, and a mini gymkhana located at the rear of the auditorium, used for indoor games such as table tennis and carrom. Students also make use of the nearby Oval Maidan and the University of Mumbai ground for outdoor sports such as cricket and football.

=== Transport and access ===
The college is served by Churchgate railway station, the southern terminus of the Western Line of the Mumbai Suburban Railway, which lies directly across 'A' Road from the campus. Churchgate is also served by an underground station on the Aqua Line (Line 3) of the Mumbai Metro, which provides an interchange with the Western Railway at Churchgate. The BEST bus network serves the area through several nearby stops, including "Government Law College", "Ahilyabai Holkar Chowk (Churchgate)", "Ahilyabai Holkar Chowk (Churchgate) / Eros Cinema" and "Hutatma Chowk".

== Academics ==
=== Curriculum ===
Affiliated to the Mumbai University, the Government Law College follows the semester system, and provides the 5-year integrated BLS-LLB as well as the 3-year LLB course.

The 5-year course consists of a 2-year foundation in the liberal arts/sociology, followed by the 3-year curriculum of core legal subjects, which are common to the 3-year law course.

Most of the 3-year law subjects are taught by practising lawyers, rather than academics, most of them teaching part-time. The teaching, pedagogy, and curriculum for the three-year program is thus geared more towards practical professional law, rather than theoretical, academic law.

Current faculty include academics such as Prof Homer Pithawala as well as advocates practising in the higher judiciary.

Many of the more prominent faculty are alumni of the college.

=== Admissions ===
Admission to the college is through the Maharashtra Common Entrance Test - the MH LAW CET, which was introduced in 2016.

The entrance exam is compulsory for admissions for law colleges in Maharashtra, and tests legal aptitude, general knowledge, language, and reasoning skills.

85% of the seats are reserved for candidates from Maharashtra, and an overall reservation for various college seats is as high as 50%.

In 2018, over 23,000 students appeared from Maharashtra, and 16,000 students appeared for the entrance test from the rest of the country for the 3-year course.

The total number of seats are 240, and typical cut off ranks for students from the "Maharashtra General Category" is an all-India Rank of 200, while those of students from outside Maharashtra is about 120.

The Five years law course offered by the college is also considered to be one of the best in the country in terms of internships and industry exposure.

In 2018, over 15,000 students appeared for the 5-year MH LAW CET admissions test. Typical cut offs for 240 BLS-LLB seats are at All India Rank 250 for Maharashtra students belonging to the "General Category".

=== Academic programmes ===
==== Five Year Law Course ====
The B.L.S. LL.B. program is a 10-semester full-time course open to students right out of high school (Class XII in the Indian system). The first 2 years (4 semesters) constitute a 'pre-law' course where the student is taught social-science subjects like economics, political science, history, English and legal language, logic, etc.

In the next three years core law subjects, like contracts, family law, labour laws, etc. are dealt with.

In their 8th and 10th semester, the students have the option of choosing some particular subjects along with some compulsory subjects. A total of 4 practical training papers are compulsory for all the students.

The BLS or the Bachelor of Legal Sciences degree is awarded to the students by the University of Mumbai after successful completion of the 3rd year and the LLB degree is awarded after completion of 5 years.

Students are eligible to exit with a Bachelor's degree in Legal Studies (BLS) at the end of 6 semesters, but cannot practise law unless they complete the course in its entirety.

==== Three Year Law Course ====
A minimum of a Bachelor's degree is required for enrolling into the LL.B. degree. The LL.B. degree is a three-year program with classes devoted solely to the study of law, and graduates are eligible to practice as an advocate, as per the Rules of the Bar Council of India. A student who desires to learn the law but does not wish to practice as an advocate is eligible for the LL.B. (General) Degree at the end of two years.

==== Other courses ====
GLC further features specialised diploma courses which include Postgraduate Diploma Course in Securities Law, Post Graduate Diploma In Intellectual Property Rights and Diploma in Cyber-Laws offered in joint-collaboration with the Asian School of Cyber Laws. Recently the college has started the Post Graduate Certificate Course in Human Rights. All courses are taught by leading practitioners and experts.

=== The Library ===
From its humble origins in 1856, GLC's library has grown into one of the foremost law libraries in the country, housing more than 42,000 books. In addition to its extensive collection of books and law reports drawn from all over the world, the library has maintained and preserved rare books that are out of print, some of which cannot be found in any other library in India. The Library additionally features a dedicated Electronic Research Room (ERR) for student use.

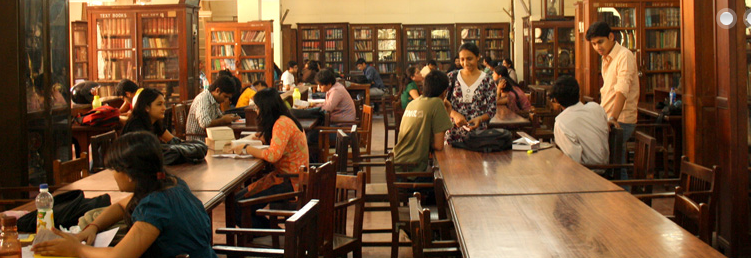
The Harilal J. Kania Memorial Library and Reading Room houses more than 42,000 books, including the original copy of the Indian Penal Code.

In 1856-57 a collection of law books was purchased for the use of the students of the college at the suggestion of Mr. E.I. Howard, Bar-at-Law and the then Director of Public Instruction.

But this could only be housed at the Native General Library at Dhobi Talao (now called the People's Free Reading Room and Library), for the lack of space. Eventually, in 1891, Government Law School and its Library were accommodated in Elphinstone College Building at Kalaghoda and on 13 July 1891, the Government sanctioned a grant of Rs.2,000/- for the purchase of furniture and other equipment for the Law Library.

Every Principal in their own way tried to enrich the library in order to make it useful to the students as well as to the practitioners. During his tenure Dr. B. R. Ambedkar prevailed upon the Government to make an additional grant of Rs. 1000/- which was sanctioned in 1936.

The Harilal J. Kania Memorial Library and Reading Room on the third floor of the college has been a part of this college since 1952. This Reading Room was created from the Harilal J. Kania Memorial Fund, which was instituted to honour the memory of Sir Harilal J. Kania, the first Chief Justice of India and an alumnus of the college. This Reading Room can accommodate as many as 200 students at a time.

The other two floors, i.e. the first and the second floors of the annex building, house various books on case law, many of which are more than a hundred years old.

The library enjoys the distinction of being the archival repository of the Civil Procedure Code of the East India Company’s Courts in the presidency of Fort St. George, and the original copy of the Indian Penal Code as drafted by Lord Macaulay in the year 1886.

=== Scholarships & Awards ===
The college provides scholarships to meritorious students. Special awards such as the Ranganathrao Trophy, the Yashwant Dalal Cup for Overall Excellence, the Diwan Jotimal Chuganee Trophy and the B.M. Vardhan’s Trophy for best Debater/Elocutionist are instituted for the overall development of students.

=== Publications ===
The college has been publishing the college magazine since 1930 and the Law Review for the last few years. The Students for the Promotion of International Law, Mumbai, better known as SPIL Mumbai, a student run committee under the aegis of the College, also publishes the annual GLC-SPIL International Law Journal.

== Student life ==
The college is known for an active student life and college teams have a consistently exemplary record in many sports. The GLC campus is located at Churchgate, to the west of the railway station, with close proximity to the Bombay High Court. The college has 17 classrooms, a Mooting Room, an Auditorium, an audio-visual room and a canteen for the benefit of students. The campus has a basketball court and a mini gymkhana at the back of the auditorium (for table tennis, carom, etc.). The students also use the nearby Oval Maidan or Mumbai University ground for sports such as cricket and football. The college has no hostel of its own. However, 62 seats for male students of the College in the Government Colleges Hostel, "C" Road, Churchgate and 20 Seats for male students at the Ismail Yusuf College at Jogeshwari, Mumbai has been provided.

GLC has been encouraging activities like Moot Courts, debates, essay competitions and other activities which help improving the legal knowledge and the oratory and literary skills of the aspiring candidates. Moot court competitions have been a regular feature since 1936. The student committees also encourage sports, music, dance and drama.

=== List of Active Student Committees ===
- Moot Court Association
- Model United Nations Society
- Magazine Committee
- SPIL Mumbai
- Placement Committee
- Intellectual Property Rights Cell
- Alternative Dispute Resolution Cell
- Alumni Association
- Sports Committee
- Legal Aid Committee
- National Service Scheme (Unit)
- Marathi Mandal
- Debating and Literary Society
- Cultural committee

=== List of Inactive/Defunct Student Committees ===
- Smt. Vinatadevi Tope Social Service League
- Entrepreneurship and Leadership Cell
- Rotaract Club
- Leo Club
- Dramatics Committee
- Music Circle
- Hindi Parishad
- Gujurati Mandal
- Bazm-E-Urdu

== Notable people ==
=== Chairman, Drafting Committee, Constitution of India ===
- Dr. B. R. Ambedkar, first Law Minister of India, Chairman of the Constitution Drafting Committee; taught as Professor at the College (1928-35); later served as Principal (1935-37).

=== Notable Alumni ===
==== Chief Justices of India ====
- Justice H. J. Kania, first Chief Justice of India (1950-1951)
- Justice P. N. Bhagwati, 17th Chief Justice of India (1985-1986)
- Justice M. H. Kania, 23rd Chief Justice of India (1991-1992)
- Justice S. P. Bharucha, 30th Chief Justice of India (2001-2002)
- Justice S. H. Kapadia, 28th Chief Justice of India (2010-2012)
- Justice U. U. Lalit, 49th Chief Justice of India (2022-2022)
- Justice B. R. Gavai, 52nd Chief Justice of India (2025) (Note: Justice Gavai completed the first year of his LLB Degree at GLC Mumbai, before transferring to Amravati University, from where he ultimately completed his degree in law.)

==== Judiciary ====
- Justice Surendra Prasad Singh, 9th Chief Justice of Nepal (1995-1997).
- Justice B. N. Srikrishna, former Judge, Supreme Court of India.
- Justice M. C. Chagla, 1st Indian Chief Justice of Bombay High Court.
- Justice R. M. Kantawala, former Chief Justice of Bombay High Court
- Justice Naresh Harishchandra Patil, former Chief Justice of the Bombay High Court.
- Justice Ajit Prakash Shah, former Chief Justice of the Delhi High Court.
- Justice Dilip Babasaheb Bhosale, Chief Justice of the High Court of Judicature at Allahabad.
- Justice V. D. Tulzapurkar, Judge, Supreme Court of India.
- Justice Nitin M. Jamdar, Acting Chief Justice of the Bombay High Court; Chief Justice of the High Court of Kerala.
- Justice Somashekhar Sunderesan, Judge, Bombay High Court; securities law expert.
- Justice Hemant Gokhale, former Judge, Supreme Court of India; Chief Justice of Madras High Court and Allahabad High Court.
- Justice Ferdino Rebello, Chief Justice, Allahabad High Court; former Judge, Bombay High Court.
- Justice A. S. Oka, former Judge, Supreme Court of India; former Chief Justice, Karnataka High Court and Bombay High Court.
- Justice S. T. Desai, 1st Chief Justice of the Gujarat High Court.
- Justice G. T. Nanavati, former Judge, Supreme Court of India; Chairman of the Nanavati Commission.
- Justice Arif S. Doctor, Permanent Judge, Bombay High Court.
- Justice Gautam S. Patel, former Judge Bombay High Court (2013-2024).

==== Senior Advocates ====
- A. G. Noorani, Senior Advocate, Supreme Court of India and Bombay High Court.
- Anil Divan, Senior Advocate, Supreme Court of India.
- Fali S. Nariman, Senior Advocate, Supreme Court of India; former President of the Bar Association of India.
- H. M. Seervai, Advocate General of Maharashtra; Senior Advocate of Supreme Court of India.
- Haresh Jagtiani, Senior Advocate, Bombay High Court.
- Nani Palkhivala, Senior Advocate, Supreme Court of India and constitutional law expert
- Ram Jethmalani, criminal lawyer, Senior Advocate, Supreme Court of India.
- Syed Sharifuddin Pirzada, Senior Advocate, Supreme Court of Pakistan; architect of the constitution of Pakistan; and personal secretary to Muhammad Ali Jinnah.
- Soli Sorabjee, Senior Advocate, Supreme Court and former Attorney General of India.
- Mukul Rohatgi, Senior Advocate, Supreme Court of India and former Attorney General of India
- Vishwajit Sawant, Senior Advocate, Bombay High Court.
- Dinesh Vyas, Senior Advocate, Supreme Court of India; President, ITAT Bar Association, Mumbai.
- Ashok Desai, Senior Advocate, Supreme Court of India; former Attorney General of India.

==== Government and Public Service ====
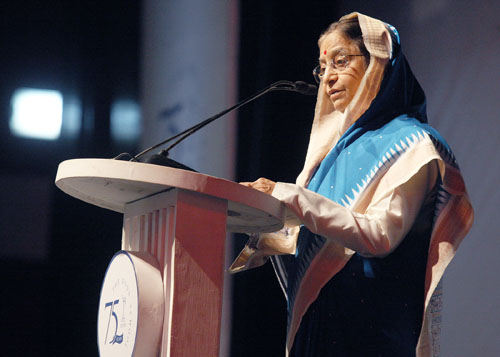
Smt. Pratibha Patil, the first woman President of India

- Dr. B. R. Ambedkar, first Law Minister of India, Chairman of the Constitution Drafting Committee, former Principal of the College.
- Shriniwas Dadasaheb Patil, Indian politician; Retired Indian Administrative Service officer; Former Governor of Sikkim (2013-2018); Member of Parliament (Lok Sabha) (1999-2009, 2019-2024).
- Bal Gangadhar Tilak, freedom fighter, Noted Educationist, Journalist & Prominent Social Reformer.
- Smt. Pratibha Patil, former President of India.
- L. K. Advani, former Deputy Prime Minister of India.
- Piyush Goyal, 38th Railway Minister Of India.
- Praniti Shinde, Member of Parliament, Lok Sabha.
- Gurudas Kamat, former Union Minister of State for Home Affairs; Member of Parliament, Lok Sabha.
- B. N. Datar, former Union Minister of State for Home Affairs; Member of Parliament, Lok Sabha.
- Ramchandra Dhondiba Bhandare, former Governor of Bihar and Andhra Pradesh; Member of Parliament, Lok Sabha; Ambedkarite activist.
- Yusuf Meherally, independence activist; Mayor of Bombay (1942–1943); credited with coining the slogan "Quit India".
- M. V. Rama Rao, freedom fighter; member, Constituent Assembly of India; Home Minister of Mysore State.
- Damcho Dorji, first Attorney General of Bhutan; former Foreign Minister of Bhutan.
- Pramod Chandra Mody, former Chairperson, Central Board of Direct Taxes; Secretary-General, Rajya Sabha.
- Violet Alva, Deputy Home Minister of India; first female Deputy Chairperson of Rajya Sabha.
- Joachim Alva, Sheriff of Bombay; 3-term Lok Sabha MP; later Rajya Sabha MP.
- Rahimtulla M. Sayani, freedom fighter; President of Indian National Congress in 1896, Calcutta session.
- Dilip Walse Patil, NCP politician, 8-time Maharashtra MLA; currently Minister of Co-operation, Govt. of Maharashtra.

==== Social Reform and Academia ====
- M. G. Ranade, social reformer and economist.
- Asaf Ali Asghar Fyzee, Islamologist, academic and former Ambassador of India to Egypt (1949-1952).
- Ananth Prabhu Gurpur, Cyberlaw expert, Professor in Computer Engineering at the Sahyadri College of Engineering and Management.
- Hemant Gokhale, part-time Professor of Law, Government Law College, Mumbai (1977–1984), prior to his judicial career.

==== Corporate Leaders ====
- Chandrashekhar Agashe, founder of Brihan Maharashtra Sugar Syndicate
- Rahul Bajaj, Chairman, Bajaj Auto.
- Deena Mehta, first woman member of the Bombay Stock Exchange and its first woman president.
- Fakhruddin T. Khorakiwala, founder, Akbarallys; Sheriff of Mumbai; Chancellor, Jamia Millia Islamia.
- Balvant Parekh, founder, Pidilite Industries ("the Fevicol Man")
- Kishore Lulla, founder and chairman, Eros Media World (formerly Eros International)

==== Constitutional Office Holders ====
- Ashok Desai, former Solicitor General of India
- M. C. Setalvad, former Attorney General of India
- Goolam Vahanvati, former Attorney General of India
- Mukul Rohatgi, former Attorney General of India
- T. R. Andhyarujina, former Solicitor General of India

==== Corporate Lawyers ====
- Cyril Shroff, Managing Partner, Cyril Amarchand Mangaldas.
- Shardul S. Shroff, Managing Partner, Shardul Amarchand Mangaldas.
- Bahram Vakil, founding partner, AZB & Partners
- D.M. Harish, taxation and property law authority
- Nishith Desai, founder, Nishith Desai Associates
- Bharat Vasani, former Group General Counsel, Tata Sons
- Raian Karanjawala, Managing Partner, Karanjawala & Co.
- Zulfiquar Memon, founder and Managing Partner, MZM Legal (Note: Memon enrolled at Government Law College, Mumbai in 1995 but left before completing his degree, subsequently graduating from Pune University in 2005.)

==== Arts & Entertainment ====
- Kareena Kapoor Khan, Bollywood actress; enrolled at the college for a year before pursuing acting.
- Pranutan Bahl, actress and lawyer.
- Karan Singh Tyagi, lawyer, screenwriter and film director.
- Kanhaiyalal Maneklal Munshi, freedom fighter; prolific Gujarati writer; Minister of Agriculture and Food (1947-1953).
- Purushottam Laxman Deshpande (P. L. Deshpande), Marathi writer, humorist, actor and musician; Padma Bhushan and Sahitya Akademi Award recipient
- Jerry Pinto, poet, novelist and translator; Sahitya Akademi Award and Windham–Campbell Prize recipient
- Bhawana Somaaya, film journalist, critic and author; Padma Shri recipient.
- Kanak Rele, classical dancer and choreographer, exponent of Mohiniyattam; Padma Bhushan recipient.
- Shirish Atre-Pai, Marathi writer and poet; introduced the haiku form to Marathi literature.
- Michael Ferreira, three-time World Amateur Billiards Champion; Padma Bhushan recipient.
- Savio Rodrigues, investigative journalist, writer and politician (Note: Rodrigues completed only the first year of his B.A. LL.B. at Government Law College, Mumbai, in 2000.)

=== Prominent faculty ===
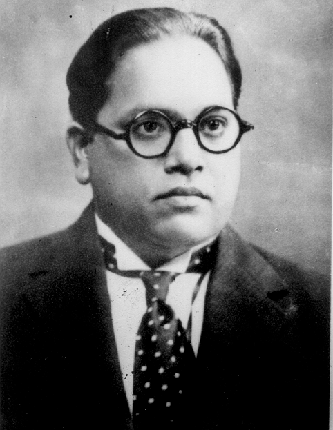
B. R. Ambedkar served as the Principal of Government Law College, Bombay from 1935 to 1937

- B. R. Ambedkar, former principal, first Law Minister of India and Chairman, Drafting Committee of the Constitution of India
- Bal Gangadhar Tilak, Indian freedom fighter, famous as Father of Indian Discontent and one of the First Generation of Indians to have graduated.
- Justice Y.V. Chandrachud, 16th Chief Justice of India; taught at the College between 1949-1952.
- Sir Dinshah Fardunji Mulla, former principal, Privy Councilor, founding partner of Mulla & Mulla.
- Justice D.Y. Chandrachud, 50th Chief Justice of India (2022-2024), taught Civil Procedure, Arbitration, and Limitation Law at the College between 1993-94; served at first Chairperson of the newly formed Academic Council in 2013; Editor-in-Chief of the GLC Law Review.
- Dr. Trimbak Krishna Tope, Principal from 1958-75, noted authority on constitutional law.
- Nanabhoy Palkhivala, former professor, noted constitutional lawyer.
- M. C. Chagla, former professor, Chief Justice of Bombay High Court.
- Ram Jethmalani, former professor, noted criminal lawyer.
- Homer Pithawalla, noted professor; solicitor of the Supreme Courts of India, England and Hong Kong.
- Mithan Jamshed Lam, first Indian woman barrister; first Indian woman lawyer at the Bombay High Court; first female Sheriff of Bombay, Padma Bhushan recipient; first female professor at the College.
- Pandurang Vaman Kane, Indologist and Sanskrit scholar.
- Hemant Gokhale, part-time Professor of Law, 1977–1984, prior to his judicial career; later Judge, Supreme Court of India.

== See also ==
- List of Mumbai Colleges
