= Shardul =

Shardul may refer to:

- Shardul (given name)
- INS Shardul (1975), a tank landing ship of the Indian Navy
- INS Shardul (2004), an amphibious warfare ship of the Indian Navy
- Shardul Amarchand Mangaldas & Co, an Indian law firm
