= Olga Tellis v. Bombay Municipal Corporation =

1985 case in the Supreme Court of India

- Court: Supreme Court of India
- Full case name: Olga Tellis and Ors. v. Bombay Municipal Corporation and Ors.
- Decided: 10 July 1985
- Citation: 1985 SCC (3) 545; 1985 INSC 151

Case opinions
- The right to life under Article 21 of the Constitution of India includes the right to livelihood.

Olga Tellis & Ors vs Bombay Municipal Corporation & Ors. Etc. (1986 AIR 180, 1985 SCR Supl. (2) 51) was a 1985 case in the Supreme Court of India. It came before the Court as a written petition by pavement and slum dwellers in Bombay (Now Mumbai), seeking to be allowed to stay on the pavements against their order of eviction during the monsoon months by the Bombay Municipal Corporation.

== Judgement ==
The then Chief Justice of India, Y.V. Chandrachud delivered the unanimous judgement by the five-judge bench consisting of himself, and justices A.V. Varadarajan, O. Chinnappa Reddy, Syed Murtaza Fazl Ali, and V.D. Tulzapurkar. Some main points include:

- "For the purposes of argument, we will assume the factual correctness of the premises that if the petitioners are evicted from their dwellings, they will be deprived of their livelihood. Upon that assumption, the question which we have to consider is whether the right to life includes the right to livelihood, We see only one answer to that question, namely, that it does. The sweep of the right to life conferred by Art. 21 is wide and far-reaching... That, which alone makes it possible to live, leave aside what makes life liveable, must be deemed to be an integral component of the right to life."
- "Two conclusions emerge from this discussion: one, that the right to life which is conferred by Art. 21 includes the right to livelihood and two, that it is established that if the petitioners are evicted from their dwellings, they will be deprived of their livelihood. But the Constitution does not put an absolute embargo on the deprivation of life or personal liberty. By Art. 21, such deprivation has to be according to procedure established by law"
- "In order to minimise the hardship involved in any eviction, we direct that the slums, wherever situated, will not be removed until one month after the end of the current monsoon season..."

== Enforcement of the Decision and Outcome ==
The pavement dwellers were evicted without resettlement. Since 1985, the principles in this case have been affirmed in many subsequent decisions, leading to large-scale evictions without resettlement. For example, in the Narmada dam cases, adequate resettlement was ordered but most affected evictees have not been properly resettled and the majority of the Court declined to examine the extent to which their judgment was enforced: see Narmada Slay Andolan v. Union of India (2000) 10 SCC 664

== Significance of the case ==
Reflecting on the contradictory nature of the case, Olga Tellis commented: "Ironically, the case helped the propertied classes; lawyers often cite the case to justify eviction of tenants and slum dwellers. But it also helps the slum dwellers; the Government can't evict them summarily. The case also spawned a lot of interest in fighting for housing as a fundamental right but if you were a pavement dweller, it is just not enough." This case is widely quoted as exemplifying the use of civil and political rights to advance social rights but it is also criticized due to its failure to provide for the right to resettlement. It is also inconsistent with developments in other jurisdictions, where courts have found stronger rights to resettlement.
