= Cyril Shroff =

Indian lawyer

- Born: 7 November 1959 (age 66); Mumbai, Maharashtra, India
- Education: Sydenham College of Commerce and Economics; Government Law College, Mumbai
- Occupation: Lawyer
- Organization: Cyril Amarchand Mangaldas
- Spouse: Vandana Shroff
- Children: 2
- Relatives: Shardul S. Shroff (brother); Karan Adani (son-in-law)
- Website: cyrilshroff.com

Cyril Suresh Shroff (born 1959) is an Indian corporate lawyer.

He is notable as the managing partner of Cyril Amarchand Mangaldas (CAM), India's largest full services law firm.

He was previously managing partner of Amarchand & Mangaldas & Suresh A Shroff & Co, from 1995 until its split into CAM and Shardul Amarchand Mangaldas & Co in 2015.

== Early life and career ==
Cyril was born the son of Suresh Amarchand Shroff, a former managing partner of Amarchand & Mangaldas & Suresh A Shroff & Co. His grandfather started the firm in partnership with Mangaldas Mehta in 1917.

Shroff was admitted to the Bar in 1982 after receiving his BA, LLB degree from the Government Law College, Mumbai. He is a solicitor, High Court of Bombay, since 1983.

He was granted control of Amarchand Mangaldas' Mumbai operations at the age of 35, and eventually rose to the status of being a favoured adviser to India's corporate elite.

His career as a lawyer spanned 40 years in a range of commercial areas. He was branded by a reporter at one point in his career as the 'M&A King of India'.

== Memberships and affiliations ==
- Chairman of FICCI’s Corporate Laws Committee
- Member of the Reserve Bank of India (RBI) working committee on regulatory issues relating to Fintech
- He was a member of SEBI constituted Uday Kotak Committee on Corporate Governance and SEBI Committee on Municipal Bonds Development
- Governing Council Member of Krea University

== Background and family ==
Cyril is married to Vandana, who is also a partner at his firm. He has two children, Rishabh Shroff, and Paridhi Adani (née Schoff), both of whom have roles as partners at the firm.

Rishabh is married to Saloni Shroff. Paridhi is married to Karan Adani, son of Gautam Adani, chairman and founder of the Adani Group.

Shroff is an avid charcoal sketcher and Hindi film buff.
