= Smt. Vinatadevi Tope Social Service League =

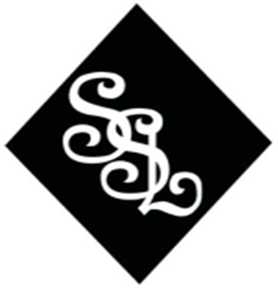
- Established: 1966
- Founder: Dr. Trimbak Krishna Tope
- Type: Student organization at Government Law College, Mumbai
- Website: http://sslglc.com

Smt. Vinatadevi Tope Social Service League (also known as SSL or the League) is one of the oldest and most prestigious student committees of Government Law College, Mumbai. The league was established in 1966 by then Principal Dr. Trimbak Krishna Tope in the fond memory of his late wife, Smt. Vinatieri Tope. The league celebrated its semicentennial anniversary in the academic year 2015-16.

The league undertakes various projects for the welfare of society as a whole. This is achieved by tie-ups with the government as well as non-profit organizations. Some of the major events organized by SSL include: Udaan - An Inter NGO Competition for Children; Shikhar - An Exhibition cum Charity Sale; and Vivechan - A Socio-Legal Essay Writing Competition.

== Origins and Founding ==
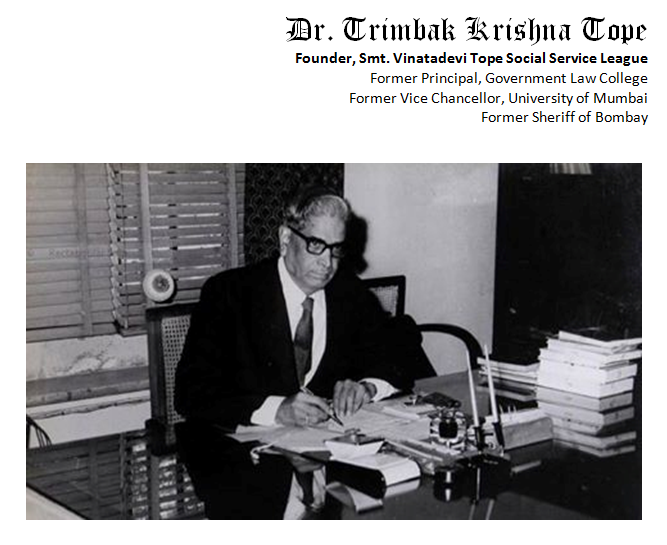
Principal Dr. Trimbak Krishna Tope was the founder and first President of Smt. Vinatadevi Tope Social Service League of Government Law College.

Principal Dr. Trimbak Krishna Tope was a distinguished jurist, former two-time Vice Chancellor of the University of Mumbai, former Sheriff of Mumbai, and the longest serving Principal of Government Law College, Mumbai. He was a firm believer in social service. He wanted to sensitize the law students about the real picture of the society, so that they work towards its betterment, selflessly, as law is an instrument of social change.

As a result, Dr. Tope laid the foundation stone of Smt. Vinatadevi Tope Social Service League in the year 1966, also serving as its first and longest serving President, from 1966 to 1975.

SSL is one of the four oldest student committees of Government Law College, Mumbai (the other three being the Moot Court Association, the Magazine Committee and the Sports Committee). It is also the only committee whose President was also the Principal of Government Law College.

== Activities and Events ==
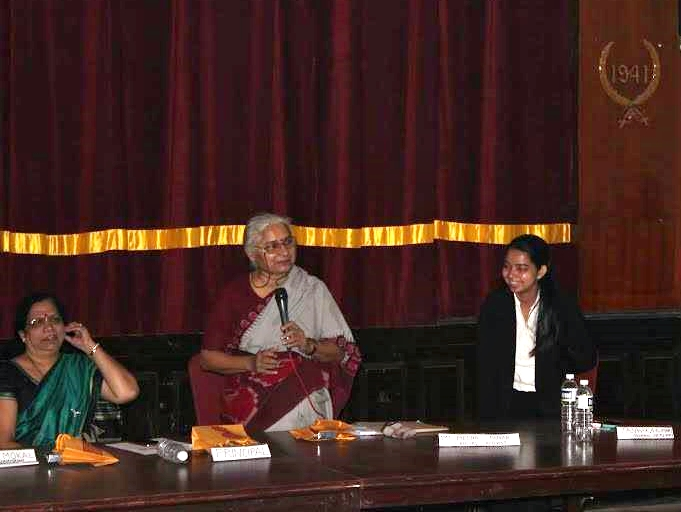
Renown social activist Smt. Medha Patkar addressing the audience at the Opening Ceremony of Shikhar 2015.

Every year, SSL undertakes various projects, benefiting students, NGOs, and the community at large. Some of the major projects are as follows:-

- Shikhar - An Exhibition cum Charity Sale
- Udaan - Inter NGO Fest for Underprivileged Children
- Vivechan - National Socio-Legal Essay Competition
- Blood Donation Drive
- Beach Cleanliness Drive
- Youth for Healthy Mumbai Awareness Drive
- NGO Visits
- Drishti - A cell to help and support the visually challenged students of the college
- Sheshpath - National Scribes & Readers Project in collaboration with Retina India
- Principal Dr. Trimbak Krishna Tope Memorial Lecture

== SSL Core for 2016-17 ==
The following is SSL Core for 2016-17:

- Chairperson: Prof. Dr. Rachita Ratho
- General Secretary: Shamal Kamble
- Additional General Secretary: Dipti Karadkar
- Treasurer: Kanika Tyagi
- Additional Treasurer: Ayushi Tambi
- Creative Head: Kirti Bhardwaj
- Drishti Head: Kashish Garg
- Fundraising Head: Chitrakshi Dubey
- NGO Head: Rashmika Singh Tanwar
- Public Relations Head: Abeera Dubey
- Student Coordinator: Prarthna Nanda
