= Tejas Karia =

Indian judge

Hon'ble Justice Tejas Karia

Judge of Delhi High Court
- Incumbent
- Assumed office 14 February 2025
- Nominated by: D. Y. Chandrachud
- Appointed by: Droupadi Murmu

Personal details
- Born: February 1, 1978 (age 48) Ahmedabad, Gujarat
- Education: ILS Law College
- Occupation: Judge

Tejas Dhirenbhai Karia is an Indian judge currently serving as a judge of the High Court of Delhi. Prior to his appointment to the bench, he was a lawyer specialising in arbitration law. He was also a partner at Shardul Amarchand Mangaldas & Co law firm.

== Early life and education ==
Justice Karia graduated in law from ILS Law College, University of Pune and obtained a Master of Law in Corporate and Commercial Laws from University of Gujrat. He also obtained a masters degree from London School of Economics with specialisation in International Commercial Arbitration and Information Technology Laws.

He enrolled as an advocate with the Bar Council of Gujarat. He was also a partner at Shardul Amarchand Mangaldas & Co law firm and headed its arbitration practice.

== Career ==
Karia was recommended for elevation by the High Court Collegium on 25 October 2023 and by the Supreme Court Collegium on 29 August 2024.

The Government of India cleared this appointment on 12 February 2025. On 14 February 2025, he was appointed as judge of the High Court of Delhi.
