= List of Privy Counsellors (1910–1936) =

This is a list of privy counsellors of the United Kingdom appointed during the reign of King George V, from 1910 to 1936. The first woman to serve on the council, Margaret Bondfield, was appointed during this period (1929).

== George V ==
=== 1910 ===
- Sir Samuel Evans (1859–1918)
- Prince Arthur of Connaught (1883–1938)
- The Lord Knollys (1837–1924)
- The Hon. Sir William Carington (1845–1914)
- Sir Arthur Bigge (1849–1931)
- Sir William Robson (1852–1918)
- The Lord Sheffield (1839–1925)
- Sir George Murray (1849–1936)
- Sir William Mather (1838–1920)
- Ronald Munro-Ferguson (1860–1934)
- James Caldwell (1839–1925)
- Sir George Buchanan (1854–1924)

=== 1911 ===
- Sir Charles Swann, Bt (1844–1929)
- Sir Joseph Compton-Rickett (1847–1919)
- William Abraham (1842–1922)
- John Frederick Cheetham (1835–1916)
- Abraham Fischer (1850–1913)
- The Master of Elibank (1870–1920)
- The Lord Kinnear (1833–1917)
- Sir Edward Morris (1859–1935)
- Sir Vezey Strong (1857–1920)
- Sir William Anson, Bt (1843–1914)
- Sir Frederick Pollock, Bt (1845–1937)
- Sir John Rhys (1840–1915)
- Sir Rufus Isaacs (1860–1935)
- Thomas McKinnon Wood (1855–1927)
- Thomas Macnamara (1861–1931)
- John Henry Whitley (1866–1935)
- Charles Fenwick (1850–1918)
- John Wilson (1858–1932)
- Bonar Law (1858–1923)
- William Fisher (1853–1920)
- Laurence Hardy (1854–1933)
- F. E. Smith (1872–1930)
- Frederick Huth Jackson (1863–1921)
- The Lord Islington (1866–1936)
- Andrew Fisher (1862–1928)

=== 1912 ===
- The Earl of Durham (1855–1928)
- The Lord Lucas and Dingwall (1876–1916)
- Robert Borden (1854–1937)
- Sir Francis Hopwood (1860–1947)
- George Lambert (1866–1958)
- Charles Allen (1861–1930)
- Thomas Ferens (1847–1930)
- The Lord Strachie (1858–1936)
- Lord Richard Cavendish (1871–1946)
- Sir Henry Primrose (1846–1923)
- Charles Masterman (1873–1927)
- Sir David Brynmor Jones (1851–1921)
- Sir Henry Dalziel (1868–1935)
- Sir Albert Spicer, Bt (1847–1934)
- Sir John Lawrance (1832–1912)
- Sir John Hamilton (1859–1934)
- Sir Conyngham Greene (1854–1934)

=== 1913 ===
- The Earl of Desart (1848–1934)
- Sir John Simon (1873–1954)
- The Lord Parker of Waddington (1857–1918)
- Sir Cecil Spring Rice (1859–1918)
- The Lord Welby (1832–1915)
- Herbert Lewis (1858–1933)
- Sir Alfred Mond, Bt (1868–1930)
- Sir Charles Swinfen Eady (1851–1919)
- Sir Louis du Pan Mallet (1864–1936)
- Sir Arthur Hardinge (1859–1933)
- Sir Joshua Williams (1837–1915)
- Sir Walter Phillimore, Bt (1845–1929)
- Robert Munro (1868–1955)

=== 1914 ===
- The Lord Parmoor (1852–1941)
- Sir Guy Fleetwood Wilson (1850–1940)
- William Massey (1856–1925)
- Willoughby Dickinson (1859–1943)
- The Lord Colebrooke (1861–1939)
- Sir William Pickford (1848–1923)
- Sir Arthur Channell (1838–1928)
- The Lord St Davids (1860–1938)
- Sir Thomas Bucknill (1845–1915)
- Harold Tennant (1865–1935)
- Ellis Jones Griffith (1860–1926)
- Joseph Cook (1860–1947)
- The Earl Kitchener (1850–1916)
- Prince Louis of Battenberg (1854–1921)
- Sir Frederick Ponsonby (1867–1935)

=== 1915 ===
- Arthur Henderson (1863–1935)
- Sir William MacGregor (1846–1919)
- Sir James Rose Innes (1855–1942)
- Sir Eldon Bankes (1854–1946)
- The Hon. Edwin Montagu (1879–1924)
- Sir Thomas Warrington (1851–1937)
- Sir Stanley Buckmaster (1861–1934)
- Sir John Jordan (1852–1925)
- Lord Robert Cecil (1864–1958)
- The Lord Newton (1857–1942)
- Francis Acland (1874–1939)
- Harold Baker (1877–1960)
- Sir George Cave (1856–1928)
- Henry Duke (1855–1939)
- J. M. Robertson (1856–1933)

=== 1916 ===
- Sir Matthew Joyce (1839–1930)
- Sir Frederick Banbury, Bt (1850–1936)
- Sir Daniel Goddard (1850–1922)
- George Barnes (1859–1940)
- Will Crooks (1852–1921)
- Leverton Harris (1864–1926)
- Donald Maclean (1864–1932)
- Sir Hugh Jenkins (1858–1928)
- The Lord Chelmsford (1868–1933)
- Billy Hughes (1862–1952)
- Francis Mildmay (1861–1947)
- Christopher Addison (1869–1951)
- C. W. Bowerman (1851–1947)
- Sir Gilbert Parker, Bt (1862–1932)
- Sir Harry Samuel (1853–1934)
- Sir George Foster (1847–1931)
- John Macdonald (1854–1939)
- The Earl of Crawford (1871–1940)
- Sir Thomas Scrutton (1856–1934)
- The Lord Rhondda (1856–1918)
- Sir Albert Stanley (1874–1948)
- John Hodge (1855–1937)
- Sir Joseph Maclay, Bt (1857–1951)
- Rowland Prothero (1851–1937)
- Sir Frederick Cawley, Bt (1850–1937)
- Albert Illingworth (1865–1942)
- William Brace (1865–1947)
- H. A. L. Fisher (1865–1940)
- James Avon Clyde (1863–1944)

=== 1917 ===
- The Lord Cowdray (1856–1927)
- John Gulland (1864–1920)
- Thomas Wiles (1861–1951)
- Leif Jones (1862–1939)
- William Schreiner (1857–1919)
- Jan Smuts (1870–1950)
- Lord Claud Hamilton (1843–1925)
- The Hon. Neil Primrose (1882–1917)
- Henry Forster (1866–1936)
- E. G. Pretyman (1859–1931)
- Sir Evelyn Cecil (1865–1941)
- Herbert Pease (1867–1949)
- J. H. Thomas (1874–1949)
- Thomas Ashton (1844–1927)
- The Earl of Liverpool (1870–1941)
- Sir Eric Geddes (1875–1937)
- George Roberts (1868–1928)
- Sir Edward Ridley (1843–1928)
- Sir Bargrave Deane (1848–1919)
- The Lord Rothermere (1868–1940)
- Sir Charles Darling (1849–1936)
- Sir Auckland Geddes (1879–1954)

=== 1918 ===
- Lord Edmund Talbot (1855–1947)
- Lord Hugh Cecil (1869–1956)
- Sir Henry Craik, Bt (1846–1927)
- Sir Gordon Hewart (1870–1943)
- Sir Henry Norman, Bt (1858–1939)
- Thomas Richards (1859–1931)
- The Lord Beaverbrook (1879–1964)
- The Lord Pirrie (1847–1924)
- Sir William Weir (1877–1959)
- The Viscount French (1852–1925)
- Edward Shortt (1862–1935)
- The Earl of Donoughmore (1875–1948)
- William F. Lloyd (1864–1937)
- William Adamson (1863–1936)
- Sir William Bull (1863–1931)
- Sir Edward Goulding, Bt (1862–1936)
- Sir Archibald Williamson, Bt (1860–1931)
- Ian Macpherson (1880–1937)
- J. R. Clynes (1869–1949)
- Sir Laming Worthington-Evans, Bt (1868–1931)

=== 1919 ===
- Andrew Weir (1865–1955)
- Sir Satyendra Prasanna Sinha (1863–1928)
- Sir Louis Henry Davies (1845–1924)
- Sir Lyman Duff (1865–1955)
- Sir Robert Horne (1871–1940)
- Sir James Atkin (1867–1944)
- Sir Horace Brooks Marshall (1865–1936)
- The Earl of Lytton (1876–1947)
- The Viscount Peel (1867–1937)
- The Lord Lee of Fareham (1868–1947)
- Sir Ralph Paget (1864–1940)
- Sir Esmé Howard (1863–1939)
- The Hon. Sir Francis Hyde Villiers (1852–1925)
- Sir Robert Younger (1861–1946)
- Sir Tudor Walters (1868–1933)
- Sir Charles Eliot (1862–1931)

=== 1920 ===
- Sir Arthur Griffith-Boscawen (1865–1946)
- The Hon. Freddie Guest (1875–1937)
- Charles Doherty (1855–1931)
- Sir Frederick Lugard (1858–1945)
- Arthur Sifton (1858–1921)
- William Watt (1871–1946)
- Sir William Thomas White (1866–1955)
- Edward, Prince of Wales (1894–1972)
- Adrian Knox (1863–1932)
- Sir Hamar Greenwood, Bt (1870–1948)
- Charles McCurdy (1870–1941)
- Thomas Morison (1868–1945)
- Stanley Baldwin (1867–1947)
- Frederick Kellaway (1870–1933)
- F. S. Malan (1871–1941)
- Sir Clifford Allbutt (1836–1925)
- Sir George Grahame (1873–1940)
- The Lord d'Abernon (1857–1941)
- William Bridgeman (1864–1935)
- Arthur Meighen (1874–1960)
- Sir Horace Rumbold, Bt (1869–1941)
- Sir John Tilley (1869–1952)

=== 1921 ===
- William Burdett-Coutts (1851–1921)
- Sir Alfred Lawrence (1843–1936)
- Sir Robert Stout (1844–1930)
- Sir Edwin Cornwall, Bt (1863–1953)
- Sir Thomas Smartt (1858–1929)
- V. S. Srinivasa Sastri (1869–1946)
- The Duke of Atholl (1871–1942)
- Sir Ronald Graham (1870–1949)
- Isaac Isaacs (1855–1948)
- George Pearce (1870–1952)

=== 1922 ===
- The Viscount Esher (1852–1930)
- James Hope (1870–1949)
- Sir Ernest Pollock, Bt (1861–1936)
- Charles Murray (1866–1936)
- The Earl of Ronaldshay (1876–1961)
- Lord Salvesen (1857–1942)
- Leo Amery (1873–1955)
- Leslie Wilson (1876–1955)
- William Lyon Mackenzie King (1874–1950)
- The Hon. Edward Wood (1881–1959)
- Sir Philip Lloyd-Greame (1884–1972)
- Sir Robert Sanders, Bt (1867–1940)
- Sir Samuel Hoare, Bt (1880–1959)
- Sir John Baird, Bt (1874–1941)
- Sir Anderson Montague-Barlow (1868–1951)
- George Tryon (1871–1940)
- Neville Chamberlain (1869–1940)
- Douglas Hogg (1872–1950)
- The Hon. William Watson (1873–1948)
- Sir John Gilmour, Bt (1876–1940)
- Sir Samuel Roberts, Bt (1852–1926)
- Sir Archibald Salvidge (1863–1928)
- Sir William Sutherland (1880–1949)
- William Dudley Ward (1877–1946)
- Hilton Young (1879–1960)
- The Marquess of Bath (1862–1946)
- The Earl of Cromer (1877–1953)
- The Earl of Shaftesbury (1869–1961)

=== 1923 ===
- John Rawlinson (1860–1926)
- Sir William Joynson-Hicks, Bt (1865–1932)
- Montagu Norman (1871–1950)
- George Gibbs (1873–1931)
- Bolton Eyres-Monsell (1881–1969)
- Stanley Bruce (1883–1967)
- William Stevens Fielding (1848–1929)
- Sir Charles Sargant (1856–1942)

=== 1924 ===
- The Earl Winterton (1883–1962)
- The Lord Colwyn (1859–1946)
- Ronald McNeill (1861–1934)
- Henry Burton (1866–1935)
- Ramsay MacDonald (1866–1937)
- Philip Snowden (1864–1937)
- Stephen Walsh (1859–1929)
- Sir Sydney Olivier (1859–1943)
- The Lord Thomson (1875–1930)
- Sidney Webb (1859–1947)
- John Wheatley (1869–1930)
- Noel Buxton (1869–1948)
- Charles Trevelyan (1870–1958)
- Tom Shaw (1872–1938)
- Vernon Hartshorn (1872–1931)
- Fred Jowett (1864–1944)
- Frederick Roberts (1876–1941)
- Josiah Wedgwood (1872–1943)
- The Lord Muir-Mackenzie (1845–1930)
- The Hon. Walter Guinness (1880–1944)
- The Hon. Edward FitzRoy (1869–1943)
- Sir George Lloyd (1879–1941)
- Sir James Agg-Gardner (1846–1928)
- Sir Herbert Nield (1862–1932)
- Wilfrid Ashley (1867–1939)
- Hugh Macmillan (1873–1952)
- T. P. O'Connor (1848–1929)
- Sir Lancelot Carnegie (1861–1933)
- Lord Eustace Percy (1887–1958)
- Sir Arthur Ramsay-Steel-Maitland, Bt (1876–1935)
- William Graham (1887–1932)
- Ben Spoor (1878–1928)
- Sir William Mitchell-Thomson, Bt (1877–1938)

=== 1925 ===
- The Marquess of Londonderry (1878–1949)
- Francis Alexander Anglin (1865–1933)
- Prince Henry (1900–1974)
- Prince Albert, Duke of York (1895–1952)
- William Graham Nicholson (1862–1942)
- Sir Montague Lush (1853–1930)
- Sir William Mulock (1843–1944)
- George Perry Graham (1859–1943)
- Sir Ronald Lindsay (1877–1945)
- Sir Beilby Alston (1868–1929)

=== 1926 ===
- The Lord Bledisloe (1867–1958)
- The Hon. Stanley Jackson (1870–1947)
- George Lane-Fox (1870–1947)
- Gordon Coates (1878–1943)
- Sir Francis Bell (1851–1936)
- Sir John Wallis (1861–1946)
- John Gretton (1867–1947)
- Sir Halford Mackinder (1861–1947)
- The Earl of Onslow (1876–1945)
- The Lord Clinton (1863–1957)
- Sir Paul Lawrence (1861–1952)
- Sir George Clerk (1874–1951)
- Sir Lancelot Sanderson (1863–1944)

=== 1927 ===
- The Hon. William Ormsby-Gore (1885–1964)
- Sir Leslie Scott (1869–1950)
- Sir Malcolm Robertson (1877–1951)
- The Hon. George Stanley (1872–1938)
- The Earl Beatty (1871–1936)
- Sir Arthur Greer (1863–1945)

=== 1928 ===
- Sir Kingsley Wood (1881–1943)
- J. C. C. Davidson (1889–1970)
- Sir John Sankey (1866–1948)
- Sir William Solomon (1853–1930)
- The Hon. Frank Russell (1867–1946)
- Godfrey Locker-Lampson (1875–1946)
- Sir Colville Barclay (1869–1929)
- The Earl Granville (1872–1939)
- Sir William Tyrrell (1866–1947)

=== 1929 ===
- The Lord Tomlin (1867–1935)
- Sir George Lowndes (1862–1943)
- Sir Binod Mitter (1872–1930)
- William Temple (1881–1944)
- The Earl Stanhope (1880–1967)
- Alexander MacRobert (1873–1930)
- The Lord Dawson of Penn (1864–1945)
- William Wedgwood Benn (1877–1960)
- A. V. Alexander (1885–1965)
- Arthur Greenwood (1880–1954)
- George Lansbury (1859–1940)
- Margaret Bondfield (1873–1953)
- John Hills (1867–1938)
- Viscount Wolmer (1887–1971)
- Sir Ellis Hume-Williams, Bt (1863–1947)
- Herbert Spender-Clay (1875–1937)
- Earle Page (1880–1962)
- Sir Henry Slesser (1883–1979)
- Craigie Aitchison (1882–1941)
- The Earl Howe (1884–1964)
- The Earl of Plymouth (1889–1943)
- Douglas Hacking (1884–1950)
- Douglas King (1877–1930)
- Sir Francis Lowe, Bt (1852–1929)
- Sir Philip Sassoon, Bt (1888–1939)
- Sir Francis Lindley (1872–1950)
- Sir Mark Romer (1866–1944)
- Sir Montague Shearman (1857–1930)
- Sir John Astbury (1860–1939)

=== 1930 ===
- James Scullin (1876–1953)
- The Viscount Goschen (1866–1952)
- James Brown (1862–1939)
- Sir William Augustus Forbes Erskine (1871–1952)
- The Lord Amulree (1860–1942)
- R. B. Bennett (1870–1947)
- George Forbes (1869–1947)
- Sir Richard Squires (1880–1940)
- Sir Dinshah Fardunji Mulla (1868–1934)
- Jacob de Villiers (1868–1932)

=== 1931 ===
- Tom Kennedy (1874–1954)
- Herbert Morrison (1888–1965)
- Sir George Halsey Perley (1857–1938)
- Hastings Lees-Smith (1878–1941)
- The Earl of Clarendon (1877–1955)
- The Earl of Bessborough (1880–1956)
- The Earl of Willingdon (1866–1941)
- Tom Johnston (1882–1965)
- The Earl of Athlone (1874–1957)
- Sir William Jowitt (1885–1957)
- Sir Archibald Sinclair, Bt (1890–1970)
- Sir Henry Betterton, Bt (1872–1949)
- Sir Michael Myers (1873–1950)

=== 1932 ===
- Walter Elliot (1888–1958)
- Sir Thomas Inskip (1876–1947)
- Sir Clive Wigram (1873–1960)
- The Lord Wright (1869–1964)
- Sir Sidney Rowlatt (1862–1945)
- The Lord Stanmore (1871–1957)
- Joseph Lyons (1879–1939)
- Sir Frank Gavan Duffy (1852–1936)
- Sir Horace Avory (1851–1935)
- Sir Godfrey Collins (1875–1936)

=== 1933 ===
- John Latham (1877–1964)
- David Margesson (1890–1965)
- Sir Dennis Herbert (1869–1947)
- Sir John Wessels (1862–1936)
- The Hon. Sir Eric Drummond (1876–1951)
- Sir Eric Phipps (1875–1945)
- Wilfrid Normand (1884–1962)
- Sir Boyd Merriman (1880–1962)
- Sir Percy Loraine, Bt (1880–1961)

=== 1934 ===
- The Aga Khan (1877–1957)
- Sir Tej Bahadur Sapru (1875–1949)
- Lord Stanley (1894–1938)
- Sir Frederic Maugham (1866–1958)
- Sir Shadi Lal (1874–1945)
- Sir Robert Clive (1877–1948)
- Anthony Eden (1897–1977)
- The Hon. Oliver Stanley (1896–1950)
- Sir Adair Roche (1871–1956)

=== 1935 ===
- Sir George Rankin (1877–1946)
- Douglas Jamieson (1880–1952)
- The Marquess of Linlithgow (1887–1952)
- Clement Attlee (1883–1967)
- Leslie Hore-Belisha (1893–1957)
- Robert Bourne (1888–1938)
- Malcolm MacDonald (1901–1981)
- Ernest Brown (1881–1962)
- Sir Wilfrid Greene (1883–1952)
- Thomas Cooper (1892–1956)
- Duff Cooper (1890–1954)
