= Shadi Lal =

Indian jurist

The Right Honourable Sir Shadi Lal PC
- Born: 14 May 1874; Rewari, British India
- Died: 27 March 1945 (aged 70)
- Education: Punjab University; Balliol College, Oxford
- Parent: Lala Ram Prasad (father)

Sir Shadi Lal PC (14 May 1874 – 27 March 1945) was an Indian jurist in British India. He served as the Chief justice of Lahore High Court between 1920 and 1934.

Lal was the first Indian to become a Chief justice of any High Court in India.

Lal was born in Rewari, Punjab Province (now Haryana in India) in an Agrawal family. His father, Lala Ram Prasad, was a wealthy businessman. Lal was educated at Punjab University Law College and Balliol College, Oxford. He was called to the English bar at Gray's Inn in 1899. Returning to India, he was called to the Lahore bar, and became Principal of the Law College, Lahore, and dean of the law faculty of Punjab University Law College. He was elected to the Punjab Legislative Council by Punjab University in 1909, and was re-elected in 1912 and 1913.

Lal was appointed a judge of the Lahore High Court in 1919, and promoted Chief Justice in 1920, becoming the first Indian to head an Indian High Court. He was knighted in the 1921 New Year Honours.

In 1934, he was appointed to the Judicial Committee of the Privy Council and sworn of the Privy Council under the provisions of the Appellate Jurisdiction Act 1929, in succession to Sir Dinshah Mulla. He resigned in 1938 and returned to India.
