= Shardul (given name) =

Shardul is an Indian masculine given name that may refer to the following notable people:

- Shardul Gagare (born 1997), Indian chess player
- Shardul Pandit (born 1985), Indian actor and radio jockey
- Shardul Rathod, Indian film writer
- Shardul S. Shroff, Indian corporate lawyer
- Shardul Singh, 17th century Indian nobleman
- Shardul Thakur (born 1991), Indian international cricketer
- Shardul Vihan (born 2003), Indian sport shooter
