= V. D. Tulzapurkar =

Former Judge of Supreme Court of India (1977-1986)

Hon'ble Justice Vidyaranya Dattatreya Tulzapurkar

Judge of Supreme Court of India
- In office 30 September 1977 – 9 March 1986
- Nominated by: M. H. Beg
- Appointed by: Neelam Sanjiva Reddy

Judge of Bombay High Court
- In office 21 December 1963 – 29 September 1977
- Nominated by: B. P. Sinha
- Appointed by: S. Radhakrishnan

Personal details
- Born: 9 March 1921
- Died: 1 October 2004 (aged 83)
- Education: Wilson College, Mumbai (B.A.), Government Law College, Mumbai (LL.B)

Vidyaranya Dattatreya Tulzapurkar (9 March 1921 – 1 October 2004) also known as V. D. Tulzapurkar was an Indian jurist who served as a judge of the Supreme Court of India from 30 September 1977 until his retirement on 9 March 1986. He also served as the judge of Bombay High Court.

== Education ==
Tulzapurkar born on 9 March 1921. He received his education at Wilson High School, Wilson College and Government Law College in Bombay (now Mumbai). He obtained his B.A. and LL.B. degrees and qualified as an Attorney-at-Law. He enrolled as an advocate of the Bombay High Court on 1 December 1942 and practised civil and criminal law on both the original and appellate sides.

== Career ==
On being persuaded by Chief Justice M. C. Chagla, Tulzapurkar took appointment as a judge of the Bombay City Civil Court and Additional Sessions Judge on 16 July 1956, at relatively young age of 35, becoming the youngest Judge of the Bombay City Civil Court. He subsequently became Principal Judge of the City Civil Court and Sessions Judge on 19 April 1962.

On 21 December 1963, he was appointed as Additional Judge of the Bombay High Court and reappointed for two years on 22 December 1965. He finally became a permanent judge on 22 September 1966. During his tenure, he also served as Acting Chief Justice twice; from September to October 1973 and again from December 1976 to April 1977, during both occasions R. M. Kantawala was permanent Chief Justice. One important event during his acting chief justiceship was the inauguration of new building of the Nagpur District Court on 16 January 1977.

He was elevated to the Supreme Court of India on 30 September 1977 along with Justice Dhiraj Ambelal Desai. During his tenure in Supreme Court, he was part of the seven judge bench hearing S.P. Gupta v. Union of India (1981), famously known as first judges case, which established primacy of executive in judicial appointments ruling that consultation with CJI does not amount to concurrence. Other judges on the bench was P. N. Bhagwati, Syed Murtaza Fazl Ali, E. S. Venkataramiah, Alak Chandra Gupta, D. A. Desai, Raghunandan Swarup Pathak.

He died on 1 October 2004.
