= Chandrachud Commission =

One-man commission of inquiry into 1997 match-fixing allegations

Indian Match-fixing Investigations (1997) summarises the events surrounding the allegations laid by Manoj Prabhakar of match fixing in a magazine. BCCI instituted a commission to examine the charges. Based on lack of evidence, the commission dismissed all allegations.

== Prabhakar's allegations ==
Manoj Prabhakar made a public allegation against an unknown team member to the magazine Outlook in June 1997. BCCI instituted a one-man investigation commission headed by retired Chief Justice of India – Honorable Yeshwant Vishnu Chandrachud. Specifically the following games were brought to light by Manoj Prabhakar as part of his allegations:

- India vs Pakistan in Sharjah in 1991. Even with fading light, the team management asked Prabhakar and Sanjay Manjrekar to continue playing after the umpires offered light. Pakistan won the match in the last over and qualified for the finals of the trophy.
- India vs Pakistan in Colombo (Singer Cup) in 1994. Manoj Prabhakar was offered Rs 2.5 million for sabotaging the match in Pakistan's favour. Manoj claims to have shouted the player out of his room. The match was washed away due to rain.
- India vs West Indies in Kanpur in 1994. Nayan Mongia and Manoj Prabhakar scored 11 runs in 48 balls chasing West Indies total. Both the players were dropped for the subsequent match on charges of indiscipline
- India vs Pakistan in Sharjah (Date: Unknown). Both the captains Aamir Sohail and Mohammad Azharuddin claimed winning the toss.

== Commission hearings ==
BCCI wanted the commission to examine the following charges:

- Was there any truth in the allegations by Manoj Prabhakar true?
- Was any Indian cricketer, official, journalist or any other person involved in betting and match fixing?
- Did Ajit Wadekar tap the telephones of Indian cricketers?
- Was there any truth in the bribery and match-fixing reports?

Justice Chandrachud started his inquiry on 7 July 1997. Manoj Prabhakar, Kapil Dev and Outlook magazine correspondent Krishna Prasad deposed to the judge on the first day. Manoj Prabhakar did not reveal names or provide evidence of his charges (Match Fixing and Phone Tapping allegation on then Cricket Manager Ajit Wadekar).

Other people who appeared in front of the commission:

- 22 July 1997: Ajit Wadekar, Ashok Mankad, Dilip Vengsarkar and Sanjay Manjrekar
- 5 September 1997: Sachin Tendulkar, Mohammad Azharuddin, Sunil Gavaskar, Nayan Mongia and D.V.Subba Rao (Manager – West Indies Tour)
- Ajay Jadeja, Chandu Borde, Sandeep Patil, Sunil Dev (Manager – India Tour of South Africa), Makarand Waigankar (Journalist) and Dr. Ali Irani (Physiotherapist)
- Aniruddha Bahal (principal correspondent, Outlook), Lokendra Pratap Sahi (sports editor, The Telegraph), Bipin Dani (freelance journalist), SK Sham (press correspondent, Reuters), Pradeep Vijaykar (assistant editor, The Times of India), Pradeep Magazine (sports editor, Pioneer), H Natarajan (sports editor, The Indian Express) and R. Mohan (The Hindu) gave written statements to the commission.

== Chandrachud Commission report ==
Justice Chandrachud completed his inquiry in October 1997 and submitted the report on an undisclosed date to BCCI. When the match fixing controversy resurfaced in 2000, BCCI released the Chandrachud Report to the media. The report concluded:

- There was no plausible reason why Manoj Prabhakar had to wait 3 to 6 years to report match-fixing allegations. Manjrekar's statement contradicted Prabhakar's on the events at Sharjah in October 1991. No evidence was provided with respect to the Singer Cup incident nor was a report made to the Captain, Coach or Vice-captain. Manoj's allegation against Aamir Sohail and Mohammad Azharuddin on the toss incident was factually incorrect as there was no match when these 2 cricketers captained their countries in Sharjah. Manoj Prabhakar refused to name the attempted briber in spite of assurances from the judge himself. The judge concluded that Manoj's allegation was a result of his getting back at Mohammad Azharuddin. The judge had no hesitation in rejecting the allegations made by Manoj Prabhakar.
- The judge accepted Ajit Wadekar's statement on the phone-tapping allegation and dismissed the same.
- All of these inferences of journalist of match-fixing were not unjustified as the Judge himself believes that large amount of betting took place on cricket in India. But the Police said that it had not been possible for their investigating teams to identify any player or players in the Indian team who lay bets on cricket.

== Criticism ==
There was criticism in the Indian media that the commission did not examine all facts available to it. Specific areas of concern for the media was the method of recording evidence, lack of initiative to dig into the disconnect in facts of the Aamir Sohail – Mohammad Azharuddin toss, lack of questioning and evidences against people involved in betting and match-fixing, not considering the tapes of interview by Outlook with Rashead Latif (where he named five Indian cricketers involved in match fixing and which he subsequently backed out).
