= S. T. Desai =

1st Chief Justice of Gujarat

Hon'ble Chief Justice (Retd.) Sunderlal Trikamlal Desai

1st Chief Justice of Gujarat High Court
- In office 1 May 1960 – 25 January 1961
- Nominated by: B. P. Sinha
- Appointed by: Rajendra Prasad
- Preceded by: Position established
- Succeeded by: Kantilal Thakoredas Desai

Judge of Bombay High Court
- In office 1952 – 30 April 1960
- Appointed by: Rajendra Prasad

Personal details
- Born: 26 January 1901
- Died: 12 April 1992 (aged 91)
- Parent: T. R. Desai (father)
- Education: University of Mumbai

Sunderlal Trikamlal Desai (26 January 1901 – 12 April 1992) was an Indian judge and the 1st Chief Justice of Gujarat, serving from 1 May 1960 until his retirement on 25 January 1961. He later practiced as a senior counsel in the Supreme Court of India till 1988. In 1968, he was appointed Treasurer for the Indian Commission of Jurists, a member of the International Commission of Jurists (ICJ) where he was instrumental in submitting the report on the Right to Freedom of Movement before the ICJ.

== Early life ==
Desai was born in Bombay. His father T. R. Desai died young but wrote several books on Limitation, Sale of Goods, Contract Equity and Specific Relief before that. Sunderlal was a brilliant law student and was awarded the Kinloch Forbes Gold Medal for proficiency in law at the LL. B. examination of the University of Bombay from the Government Law College, Mumbai. He then proceeded to the U.K. to become a Barrister and became a member of the Bar from the Lincoln's Inn in 1927.

== Career ==
He started his career by practicing on the Original Side in the Bombay High Court. In 1952, he was elevated to the Bench of the Bombay High Court. His famous judgements include S.C.Prashar vs. Vasantsen Dwarkadas clarifying the scope of writs under Article 226 in Income-tax matters. He was also a member of the five-judge bench who delivered the Nanavati murder case judgment K. M. Nanavati v. State of Maharashtra. In May 1960, the State of Bombay bifurcated into Gujarat and Maharashtra. He became the First Chief Justice of Gujarat. Some of his landmark decisions were in the case of the Anand Municipality vs. the Union of India holding that the decisions of the Bombay High Court are binding on the Gujarat High Court. Besides discharging his duties as a Judge, he edited the 12th Edition of Mulla Hindu Law and edited his father's books. He also wrote a commentary on Partnership.

He practiced as a senior counsel in the Supreme Court of India after his retirement as Chief Justice of Gujarat from 1963 up to 1988 where he represented the Nathdwara temple trustees, the President of India, ATIRA, Ambica Mills and other famous clients.

== Mulla Hindu Law ==
Mulla Hindu Law is India's best reference book on Hindu succession, inheritance, marriage, divorce, maintenance, guardianship adoption and other family laws. The current 21st edition is being revised by Mr. Satyajeet Desai.

== Black Money Case ==
In 1957, Tata Iron & Steel Company wanted to change their Memorandum of Association in order to allow the company to make contributions to political parties. The matter went to court. Justices MC Chagla and ST Desai ruled in the Bombay High Court allowing the change but with weighty obiter. Their comments were: "The very basis of democracy is the voter and when in India we are dealing with adult suffrage it's even more important than elsewhere.. That the integrity of the voter is also safeguarded.. Before parting with this case, we think it our duty to draw the attention of Parliament to the great danger in permitting companies to make contributions to the funds of political parties. It is a danger which may grow apace and which may ultimately overwhelm and even throttle democracy in this country. Therefore, it is desirable for Parliament to consider under what circumstances and under what limitations companies would be permitted to make these contributions."

== Emergency ==
In Fali Nariman's autobiography "Before Memory Fades", he describes an episode from the period of emergency in India. He says, "Former attorney general CK Daphtary (CK) and senior advocate ST Desai (ST) were distinguished contemporaries, both Gujarati speaking. They always came in early to the Bar library, sat opposite each other, occasionally exchanging pleasantries. One morning, in August 1975, I was the sole witness to the following conversation: ST (holding a cigarette between his third and fourth fingers, with loosely clenched fists, as was his habit): Chandubhai, bolo [Chandubhai, speak].

"CK (puffing away at his pipe; his eyes sparkling with mischief) Sunderlal, tame pahle bolo [Sunderlal, you speak first]. In those dark forbidding days of the Emergency when informers were around, you only spoke, within the hearing of others, when you had to! Unwittingly, these stalwarts of the Bar had encapsulated, in an innocent, spontaneous one-act play, the entire climate of the times!"

== Treatment towards young lawyers ==
In Fali Nariman's autobiography "Before Memory Fades", he describes how Justice S. T. Desai encouraged juniors. He writes, "In my time, we were fortunate to have judges who were considerate and kind to juniors. Amongst them were Justice N. H. Coyajee, Justice Sunderlal T. Desai and Justice Kantilal T. Desai, not to forget Chief Justice M. C. Chagla, who was in a class by himself...Another judge, Justice Sunderlal T. Desai (who, after a long judicial career, practised for many years in the Supreme Court) would always slip into his judgment a word of praise for the arguing junior – a tremendous boost for the latter's morale."

== Trademark Case ==
In 1961, Justices M.C.Chagla and Desai held in the CIBA trademark case "The Court cannot look at the two trademarks and on considering them phonetically, can decide whether they resemble each other or there is likelihood of deception. There must be evidence of deception, but if the resemblance between the two marks is clear and obvious. The mark which is likely to cause deception must be removed"

== Tax Case ==
He appeared for the assessee in a number of income tax cases and was often quoted. In a particular case, arguing on Mitakshara law for Mr. Reddy, it was held in judgement,"Where ignorance is bliss, ‘Tis folly to be wise." Amen! when Desai tried to argue on the point of Hindu law.

== Election Case ==
In 1970, President V. V. Giri's Election Campaign was challenged. Desai was appointed as senior counsel to cross-examine the case cited Shiv Kirpal Singh vs Shri V. V. Giri.

== Educational law Cases ==
He argued in the landmark judgement on reserving rights of admission in educational institutions in the case of Gujarat State against St. Xavier's College.

== Maintenance to divorced women ==
He appeared before the Supreme Court in the case of Ramesh Chander Kaushal v. Veena Kaushal ((1978) 4 SCC 70) which laid down the landmark judgment that maintenance to a wife should continue under Section 127 of the Criminal Procedure Code even after divorce.

== Sales Tax case ==
In State of Tamil Nadu v Binny Ltd., Madras in Civil Appeal No. 757 (T) of 1973 appearing before a three-judge bench of the Supreme Court composed of P. N. Bhagwati, A. P. Sen. E. S. Venkataramiah JJ, he argued on the issue of whether sales of provisions effected by the assessee in a workmen's Store maintained by it are assessable to tax under Tamil Nadu General Sales-tax Act, 1959.

== Personal life ==
He was married to Taraben Desai and had three children. His grandson Satyajeet Desai is a Senior Advocate practicing in the Gujarat High Court and is the revising author of Mulla's Hindu Law and Desai on Partnership. His great grand daughters, Aarushi Desai and Manushi Desai are also lawyers practicing in Ahmedabad.
