= Shardul S. Shroff =

Indian corporate lawyer

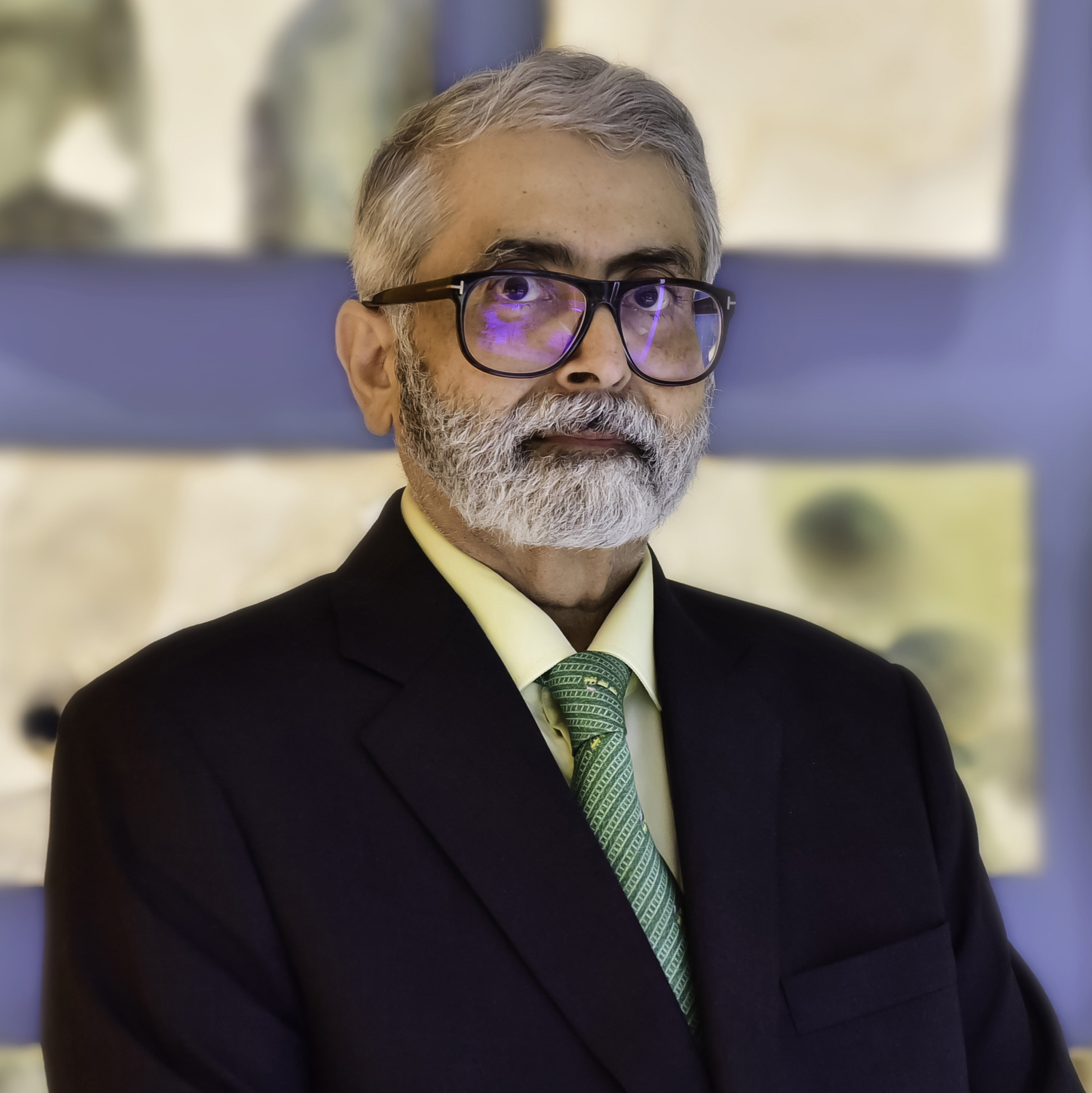
Dr. Shardul S. Shroff - Executive Chairman, Shardul Amarchand Mangaldas & Co.

Shardul Suresh Shroff is an Indian corporate lawyer. He is the executive chairman of the law firm Shardul Amarchand Mangaldas & Co. Prior to the split in the firm's predecessor Amarchand & Mangaldas & Suresh A Shroff & Co", which was India's largest law firm, Shardul used to be the managing partner of the north India region of the firm headquartered in New Delhi.

== Early life and education ==
Shroff completed his B.Com (Hons.) from Sydenham College, Mumbai and LL.B. from Government Law College, Mumbai.

== Legal career ==
On 1 July 1980, Shroff was enrolled in the bar and started his practice at Mumbai. He started to head the Delhi office of Amarchand & Mangaldas & Suresh A Shroff & Co in September 1980.

=== Past ===
==== Committee memberships ====
- Chair, Committee for Asset Valuation and Principles of Disposal of Corporate Properties, Assets and Shares; Indian government Ministry of Corporate Affairs
- Chair, Review of Offences and Penalties under the Company Law; Indian government Ministry of Corporate Affairs
- 1996–Dr. Jamshed J. Irani Committee for amending the Companies Act, 1956
- 1996–97, 2000–Securities and Exchange Board of India (SEBI)-appointed Bhagwati Committees for redrafting and modifying the SEBI Takeover Code
- Confederation of Indian Industry (CII) Task Force on Corporate Governance, which drafted the Corporate Governance Recommendations for Voluntary Adoption by directors
- second Naresh Chandra Committee appointed to look into aspects of small and medium enterprise and simplification of Company Law (LLPs and joint ventures)
- Dr. Amit Mitra Committee, appointed by the Ministry of Information and Broadcasting to revamp Radio Broadcast Policy, to recommend changes to license conditions for privatisation of the radio sector, and to propose a national broadcast regulator
- M. Damodaran – Federation of Indian Chambers of Commerce and Industry (FICCI) Committee on Corporate Governance

=== Current ===
==== Bar memberships ====
- Supreme Court Bar Association of India
- Delhi Bar Association
- International Bar Association (IBA)

He is an advocate-on-record of the Supreme Court of India.

== Affiliations ==
Shroff is Associate President of Society of Indian Law Firms (SILF), a collective of India's top corporate law firms that has opposed entry of foreign law firms into India.

== Personal life ==
Shardul Shroff is a grandson of Amarchand Shroff, who founded the law firm Amarchand & Mangaldas & Suresh A Shroff & Co in 1917. He is a son of Suresh A. Shroff, a former managing partner of the firm and Bharati Shroff, also the co-owner of the firm.

After the death of Bharti Shroff, the old firm was split into two with Shardul heading the Shardul Amarchand Mangaldas and brother Cyril Shroff heading the Cyril Amarchand Mangaldas.

Shroff is married to Pallavi Shroff, an advocate and daughter of former Chief Justice of India, PN Bhagwati. They have two daughters, Shweta Shroff and Natashaa Shroff.
