= Mulla Hindu Law =

Mulla Hindu Law is authored by Satyajeet A. Desai. It is a treatise on personal laws including marriage, divorce and inheritance governing Hindus. It was first published in 1912 by Dinshaw Mulla and later edited by Justice S. T. Desai. The current advancements giving daughters equal rights in their father's properties (coparcenary properties), adoption laws and breakdown of marriages is critically analysed.
