= Manoj Prabhakar =

Indian cricketer and Coach

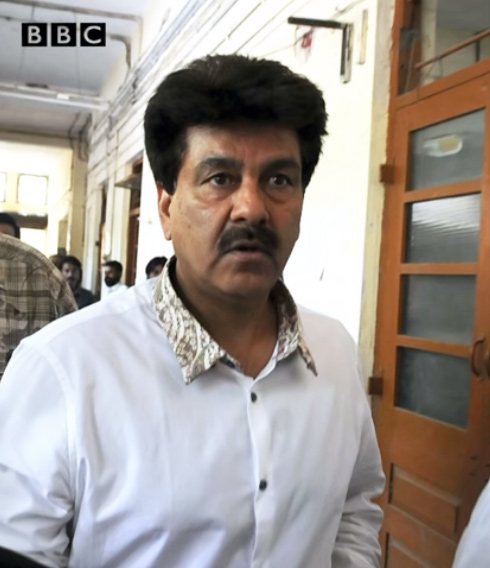

Personal information
- Born: 15 April 1963 (age 63); Ghaziabad, Uttar Pradesh, India
- Batting: Right-handed
- Bowling: Right-arm medium fast

International information
- National side: India
- Test debut (cap 168): 12 December 1984 v England
- Last Test: 8 November 1995 v New Zealand
- ODI debut (cap 47): 8 April 1984 v Sri Lanka
- Last ODI: 2 March 1996 v Sri Lanka

Domestic team information
- Years: Team
- 1982/83–1996/97: Delhi
- 1995: Durham

Career statistics
Competition	Tests	ODIs
Matches	39	130
Runs scored	1,600	1,858
Batting average	32.65	24.12
100s/50s	1/9	2/11
Top score	120	106
Balls bowled	7,475	6,360
Wickets	96	157
Bowling average	37.30	28.87
5 wickets in innings	3	2
10 wickets in match	0	0
Best bowling	6/92	5/33
Catches/stumpings	20/0	27/0
Medal record
Men's Cricket
Representing India
ACC Asia Cup
Winner	1984 United Arab Emirates
Winner	1990–91 India
Winner	1995 United Arab Emirates
- Source: ESPNcricinfo, 23 January 2006

Manoj Prabhakar (born 15 April 1963) is a former Indian cricketer and coach, who recently coached Nepal National Cricket Team. He was a right-arm medium-pace bowler and a lower-order batsman, and also opened the innings a few times for the Indian cricket team. He was part of the Indian squad which won the 1985 World Championship of Cricket, 1984 Asia Cup, 1990–91 Asia Cup and 1995 Asia Cup.

Prabhakar took 96 wickets in Test cricket, 157 wickets in One Day International (ODIs), and over 385 first class wickets playing for Delhi. He also played for English County Durham. Prabhakar is remembered for his bowling which was his strongest suit; using slower balls, out swingers and opening the bowling for Indian cricket team. He was also a useful lower-order batsman and a defensive opener. He has a world record of playing most matches as Opening Batsman and Opening Bowler in both Test and ODI matches.

== Career ==
=== As a Player ===
Prabhakar quite regularly opened Indian batting order and the bowling. He was one of the few players to do so consistently at international level. He accomplished this 45 times in ODIs and 20 times in Tests, more than any other player in both formats.

A low point came against West Indies in Kanpur in 1994, India were chasing 258 when Prabhakar finished unbeaten on 102 from 154 balls. Instead of accelerating towards the target, the chase almost ground to a halt, and India finished on 211/5, losing by 46 runs. Prabhakar's performance was widely criticized and opening a potential match-fixing investigation.

At the age of 32, Prabhakar played his last ODI against Sri Lanka in the 1996 Cricket World Cup in Delhi. He struggled to bowl well in the match, especially against openers Jayasuriya and Kaluwitharana, and had to bowl off-spin in the last two overs. The crowd booed him off the ground. After 1996 World Cup, he was not selected for Indian team's tour of England and took retirement.

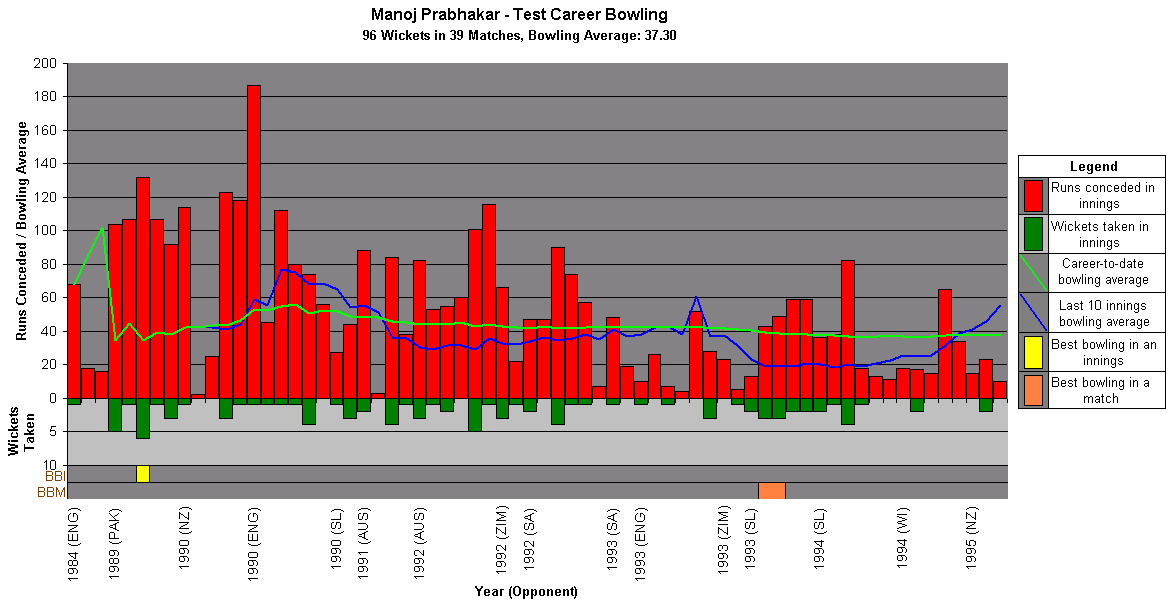
A graph showing Prabhakar's test career bowling statistics and how they have varied over time.

=== As a Coach ===
Prabhakar has also served as the Delhi cricket team's bowling coach and as the head coach of the Rajasthan cricket team. In November 2011, he was sacked as the coach of Delhi for speaking against the management and the team in media. In December 2015, he was named as bowling coach of Afghanistan cricket team ahead of 2016 ICC World Twenty20 that was played in India in March 2016.

Prabhakar was appointed head coach of Nepal in August 2022. He resigned in December 2022 after only four months.

== Controversies ==
During the Wills World Series in 1994, Prabhakar made a widely-criticized 102 runs in a slow manner in a losing fashion against the West Indies. He later alleged that an Indian teammate had offered him ₹25 lakh to underperform and eventually named Kapil Dev. Kapil denied the accusation, while the CBI subsequently said it found no credible evidence to establish Prabhakar's claim against him.

However, in 1999, Prabhakar participated in an exposé of match-fixing by the Tehelka news group. However, he was then charged by the BCCI with involvement in match fixing and subsequently banned from playing cricket for the Indian team.

In 2011, he was dismissed from his coaching role with the Delhi cricket team after he publicly criticized the players and selectors.

== Personal life ==
Prabhakar joined the Congress party and unsuccessfully contested election to the Indian Parliament from Delhi in 1996.

Prabhakar is married to actress Farheen, who is known for her roles in the films Jaan Tere Naam and Kalaignan. The couple lives in Delhi, with their two sons, Raahil Prabhakar and Manavansh Prabhakar, and Rohan Prabhakar, his son from his previous marriage to Sandhya.

== In popular culture ==
A Bollywood film Azhar released in 2016, directed by Tony D'Souza, was based on his teammate Mohammad Azharuddin's life and revolves around Match fixing scandals in late 90s and 2000. Prabhakar's character was portrayed by Karanvir Sharma in the film. According to the report of The Times of India, Prabhakar was unhappy due to his depiction in bad light in the film.

== See also ==
- List of cricketers banned for match fixing
