= Amarchand & Mangaldas & Suresh A Shroff & Co =

Indian law firm, 1917–2015

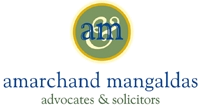
- Headquarters: New Delhi and Mumbai
- No. of offices: 8
- No. of lawyers: 655
- Key people: Shardul S. Shroff, Cyril Shroff, Pallavi Shroff, Vandana Shroff
- Date founded: 1917
- Founder: Amarchand Shroff and Mangaldas Mehta
- Company type: Partnership
- Dissolved: May 2015, Split into two different law firms- Cyril Amarchand Mangaldas and Shardul Amarchand Mangaldas & Co

Amarchand & Mangaldas & Suresh A Shroff & Co or AMSS in short, was the largest law firm in India with headquarters in Delhi and Mumbai. It had offices in 8 cities, namely New Delhi, Mumbai, Bengaluru, Ahmedabad, Hyderabad, Kolkata, Chennai and Pune. In 2013, the firm had nearly 600 lawyers including 85 partners. The firm split into two different law firms in May 2015 - Cyril Amarchand Mangaldas and Shardul Amarchand Mangaldas.

== Founding ==
AMSS was started in 1917 by Amarchand Shroff, the grandfather of Shardul S. Shroff and Cyril Shroff, who are the present Managing Partners. They took charge in 1994 after the death of their father, Suresh. Although Shardul was 39 and Cyril 35, they were easily accepted as the firm's future. They had been part of the practice for around a decade and it was a small operation of 25-30 lawyers.

The firm serves some of the largest corporations and financial institutions domestically and internationally, including clients such as Vedanta Resources, Reliance Industries, GMR Group and Morgan Stanley. It has received national and international acclaim for successful representation of its clients before legal institutions and government agencies, winning advocacy in litigation, and guiding business transactions. In addition, members of the firm regularly participate in several legal reforms committees and policy initiatives of the Government of India. The firm’s clientele includes several leading Indian and international business houses, transnational corporations and financial institutions.

== Partnership Structure ==
Most of the firm’s equity was held by the Shroff family—Cyril, Shardul and their respective wives, Vandana and Pallavi, who are also practising senior partners in the firm, and family matriarch Bharati Shroff. The rest of the profits are shared with 18 non-family equity partners in a modified lockstep model. Partners on the seven-stage ladder accrue points over time, subject to satisfying the requirements to pass two “gateways” at three years and five years. We trained our lawyers on financial statements and basics of accounting, we cross staffed across teams (such as real estate, M&A, private equity etc.). These steps helped us to be first off the blocks,” Cyril Shroff on the business development and associate management fronts.

== Change of Reign ==
In 1980 elder son of Suresh Shroff, Shardul Shroff took over the charge of the Delhi office. Suresh Shroff died in 1994. Cyril Shroff, younger son of Suresh Shroff, took over the Mumbai office in 1995. Following the death of the matriarch Bharati Shroff, the Shroff brothers had a public fallout due to ownership disputes. Their mother had willed her entire partnership interest to Shardul Shroff, contrary to the family framework agreement. Following directions of the Bombay High Court and several rounds of mediation, the firm was split between the two brothers. The firm run by Cyril Shroff came into existence on 11 May 2015 and was named as Cyril Amarchand Mangaldas. The firm run by Shardul Shroff also came into existence on 11 May 2015 and was named as Shardul Amarchand Mangaldas & Co.

== Awards ==
- Ranked as the ‘Top Law Firm in India’ on quality, reputation and capability at RSG Top 40 Firm Rankings 2010.
