= Hormasji Maneckji Seervai =

Indian jurist and lawyer

H. M. Seervai
- Born: Hormasji "Homi" Maneckji Seervai; 5 December 1906; Mumbai, Maharashtra, India
- Died: 26 January 1996 (aged 89)
- Occupations: 1957–1974 Advocate General of Maharashtra Senior Advocate; jurist
- Years active: 1920–1996
- Spouse: Feroza Seervai
- Children: Meher, Shirin and Navroz

Hormasji "Homi" Maneckji Seervai (1906–1996) was an Indian jurist, lawyer and writer. He is a well-known and widely respected Constitutional expert, and his works are commonly cited in Indian legal cases and in journals of law.

== Early life and education ==
Seervai was born on 5 December 1906 in Bombay (present-day Mumbai) in a middle class Parsi family. He matriculated from Bhada New High School in Mumbai, and in 1922 joined Elphinstone College in Bombay from which he graduated with a first class degree in philosophy. He received his law degree from Government Law College, Mumbai.

== Career ==
Seervai was called to the bar in 1929. In 1932, he joined the Chambers of Sir Jamshedji Behramji Kanga.

Seervai served as Advocate General of Bombay from 1957 to 1960 and Maharashtra from 1960 until his resignation in 1974. During those years, he was offered various other positions in the Indian judicial system. In 1971, the government of India offered to appoint him as the Attorney General for India. Declining the office with thanks, he wrote in his own hand to the Law Minister that the best contribution that he could make to the law was not to appear in Court but to "embody in successive editions of his book the correct judicial interpretation of the Constitution". He was offered judgeship of the Supreme Court twice. Each time he declined it.

His first chance in the Supreme Court of India arose in a defence of the Government of Bombay's decision to ban prize competitions, in the nature of lotteries. Seervai's argument was rewarded with spectacular success. The judgments and orders of the Bombay courts were unanimously set aside with costs.

=== Writings on history and law ===
Seervai is best known for his 1967 analysis, the Constitutional Law of India – a Critical Commentary. This work contributed significantly to Kesavananda Bharati vs. The State of Kerala (1973), his most famous case, which led to the development of the "basic structure doctrine", which inhibits politically motivated changes to the Constitution of India. Perhaps, its full repercussions have not yet completely been understood, and it is the defining and distinguishing part of democracy under the written constitution vs. the British model. The decision established that a legislature, elected for the legislative process, does not have the ability to amend the basic structure of the constitution. That in itself indicates a departure from the British Westminster democracy, where the unwritten constitution can be amended at will by the British parliament, which is the ultimate sovereign. The Indian Parliament, however, cannot change the basic structure of the Indian constitution and the same principle is championed in later cases by the Supreme Court of India. Seervai's impact on defining the limits of parliamentary sovereignty and in declaring the constitution supreme has been great for the entire subcontinent and today it has become an accepted principle that has been upheld by the Supreme Court of Pakistan as well.

His most seminal moment was in the Parliamentary Privileges Case (In Re: Keshav Singh), where Seervai, appearing for the U.P. Legislature.

His controversial Partition of India: Legend and Reality (1989) challenged the existing view that blamed the partition of India on Muhammad Ali Jinnah and the Muslim League. He argued that it was the latent bias on the part of Indian National Congress leadership which resulted in partition. It is a painstakingly accurate exercise of sifting through the Transfer of Power Papers, apart from dozens of other books on the subject of Partition, after which like a true jurist, Mr. Seervai has given his verdict and it is an interesting verdict but also a journey towards discovering the truth. The journey, Seervai says, started for Rajmohan Gandhi with his fascinating inquiry into the life of Jinnah in which the author did not shy away from criticising his famous grandfather, Mohandas Gandhi, for introducing religion into politics and for refusing to accommodate the Muslims to share power. Rajmohan Gandhi's thesis was considerably developed by Seervai, whose in-depth research and study on the subject came to the conclusion that the Congress party, rather than Jinnah, was primarily responsible for Partition by not accepting parity for Hindus and Muslims and other safeguards for Muslim interests.

== Legacy ==
Seervai has received various recognitions. He was conferred the Padma Vibhushan in 1972. In 1981, the British Academy elected Seervai its Corresponding Fellow, a distinction reserved for scholars of the highest academic distinction. In 1981, he was awarded the Dadabhai Naoroji Prize. In 1982, Seervai was elected Honorary Fellow of the Asiatic Society of Bombay. The International Bar Association recognised him as a "Living Legend of Law" in 1994. Judge Lord Denning said, "He was a great personality and one of the most learned I have met."

Seervai has been admired for his personal qualities alongside his legal work.

== Books on Seervai ==
- Seervai, Feroza H. (2005), Evoking H.M. Seervai: Jurist and Authority on the Indian Constitution, New Delhi: Universal
- "The Seervai Legacy"

== Books by Seervai ==
- "Constitutional Law of India, Vol.3, 4th Edition"
- "The Emergency, Future Safeguards & the Habeas Corpus Case: A Criticism"
- "The Position of the Judiciary under the Constitution of India".
- "Partition of India: Legend and Reality" (this monologue was included in the fourth edition of Seervai's monumental "Constitutional Law of India")
