= T. R. Desai =

T. R. Desai (1876-1914) was an Indian lawyer and author best known for writing books in Trust, Equity, Limitation, Easement, Government Tenders, Contract and Sale of Goods Act. He was the father of Justice S. T. Desai, Chief Justice of Gujarat and Senior Advocate, Supreme Court of India.

== Personal life ==
Trikamlal Ranchodlal Desai was born in Bombay in the year 1876. He was the son of Ranchhodlal Kapurchand Desai, better known as Rai Bahadur Ranchodlal Desai, a lawyer practicing in the Bombay High Court. He came from a long line of lawyers. It was Ranchhodlal Desai with whom he wrote his first commentary on Government tenders. He was married to Mahalakshmiben and had one child, Sunderalal. His father, a lawyer and author like him was famous for one of the most comprehensive criminal law journals of the Bombay High Court in his time.

== Achievements ==
T.R.Desai was offered the role of Judge in the Bombay High Court by the British Judges in 1914 at age of 39 years. However, having accepted the honour, he died before he could be sworn in.

== Best Selling Author ==
Desai opened his doors to students from his hometown of Ahmedabad, who were sitting the Bombay Bar exams, and gave them numerous private lessons. His wrote many of his commentaries with students in mind, and as a result, even today, a beginner interested in law can benefit from a quicker reading and understanding of the law.

One of the most sought out books on Limitation is T. R. Desai's commentary which is published by Universal. It covers the Indian Law on Limitation and is referred widely by lawyers and professionals.

Also available is his book on Government Tenders and Contracts published by Universal which is still considered the best sought after books in the field of tender and contract.

== T.R.Desai's Commentary on Contract and Sale of Goods Act ==
The Indian Contract Act and Sale of Goods Act Commentary by Desai is published by Lexis Nexis and is considered one of the best books on the subject. Besides this, it is extremely useful in understanding corporate law for lawyers and CAs alike. It is currently revised and edited by a law school professor.

== Commentary on Equity, Trusts and Special Relief Act ==
This commentary besides being a reference in court work is a sought after book for law amongst law students. It is currently not in publication. It summarizes the law governing equity in India. Besides that, it offers an extensive explanation of the laws governing specific relief and trusts in India. It is considered one of the best supplementary reading books of its time.

== S.T. Desai ==
S. T. Desai was the first Chief Justice of Gujarat and held the post till his retirement in 1961. During his tenure as Chief Justice, he was instrumental in establishing the foundation of the court. He later specialized in civil matters in the Supreme Court of India, representing politicians, religious bodies and companies in high profile cases including President of India and the Tirupati temple. His grandson, Satyajeet Desai a Senior Advocate, practices in the Gujarat High Court on the civil appellate side and in commercial litigation and is revising author of Mulla Hindu Law and S. T. Desai on Partnership. His Great granddaughters are also law students in Gujarat.

== List of books authored ==
- The Indian Contract Act, sale of goods act and partnership act, with notes based on English and Indian cases by Trikamlal Ranchhodlal Desai
- Lectures on Hindu Law, as prevailing in the different schools by Trikamlal Ranchhodlal Desai

First published in 1906 in English

- Law of specific relief in India and England : being an analytical commentary on the Specific Relief Act byTrikamlal Ranchhodlal Desai
- Hindu Law ... Third edition (of the Manual of Hindu Law)

1908 and 1910 Publication

- Principles of equity (with the Indian Trusts Act) by Trikamlal Ranchhodlal Desai

4 editions published between 1924 and 1947

- The Transfer of Property Act. Act IV of 1882 as amended in 1900, 1904, 1908. With complete case-law, explanatory and critical comments, High Court rules, forms of conveyances and seven useful appendices, and Easements Act, with notes of English and Indian cases ... Third edition, etc
- A Manual of the Indian Succession Act and other minor Acts prescribed for the L.L.B. [sic] Examination ... With University Examination Questions, etc

2 editions published in 1905

- Manual of land tenures, being a brief summary of the law relating to the raiatwari tenure, watans and saranjams, with full text of Land revenue code and the Watan act by Trikamlal Ranchhodlal Desai

3 editions published in 1907

- The Indian Evidence Act. Act 1 of 1872 ... Fifth edition [of "Law of Evidence" ]

1913

- Law relating to tenders and government contracts : a complete treatise on the law and principles of tenders and government contracts by Trikamlal Ranchhodlal Desai
- Law of specific relief in India and England : being an analytical commentary on the Specific Relief Act (Act I of 1877) by Trikamlal Ranchhodlal Desai

First published in 1926

- The Probate and Administration Act (Act V. of 1881) with notes of English and Indian cases, and the Succession Certificate Act (Act VII. of 1889), case-noted

1 edition published in 1912 in English
