= Homer Pithawalla =

Law professor, advocate, solicitor

Homer D. Pithawalla is a practising advocate of the Supreme Court of India and Bombay High Court as well as a solicitor of the Supreme Court of the United Kingdom and the Supreme Court of Hong Kong. He is also the senior-most professor of law and Professor Emeritus at the Government Law College, Mumbai and is recognised as one of India's leading experts on Corporate laws (Contract law & Company law) and Competition law.

== Career ==
Pithawalla graduated from St Xavier's College, before completing his degree in law Government Law College, the oldest common law college in Asia, where he has been teaching for over 53 years. Pithawalla then articled as a clerk, and passed the Bombay Incorporated Law Society's Solicitor's Examination. He completed his LLM in Business and Constitutional Law in 1970, joining academia in 1972 as a teacher at GLC.

Pithawalla's students include Supreme Court and High Court Judges (including two Chief Justices of India), Attorneys-General, Advocates-General, Ministers, and advocates from all over the world. Initially a Professor of company law, he now also lectures on contract law, property law, family law, constitutional law, legal language, and the conflict of laws. Pithawalla is also qualified to practice as a solicitor in England and Hong Kong, and is a life member of the Academy of American and International Law at the University of Texas at Dallas.

Apart from teaching at Government Law College for 53 long years, Pithawalla had been invited to lecture at the Harvard Law School, the Law School at La Sorbonne (Paris, France), the University of Cambridge, the International Bar Association, the Institute of Chartered Accountants of India, Institute of Chartered Accountants and the Institute of Chartered Secretaries.

He was also invited by the Royal Government of Bhutan to draft a contract law for their country. In the course of his visit to Bhutan, his draft was discussed at a workshop chaired by the Attorney General of Bhutan. This Act has now come into force in Bhutan.

A legal academic who is known for his generally helpful attitude, Pithawalla currently serves as the chairman of the Government Law College Placement Committee. He is known to take up causes, including speaking out about the infrastructural problems that plague the college, which is widely believed to have contributed to the "running internship" style of education at GLC, wherein students prefer to intern with firms or as paralegals for their legal education, rather than attend lectures.

Pithawalla is also the author and editor of a series of textbooks, widely used by Indian law students for law exam preparation. Apart from editing several student-oriented law books, he has authored a series of books on Company Law, Environment Law, Administrative Law, Land Laws, and The Indian Divorce Act, including the Leading Cases on the Law of Contracts. His book, Legal Language, Legal Writing & General English, is a standard text for law students as well as civil and judicial services aspirants.

Pithawalla speaks English, Hindi, Marathi, Gujarati and French. In addition to teaching French, he has been associated with Alliance Francaise de Bombay for many years. He is also the Vice President of the Franco-Indian Lawyers' Association (FILA).
