= P. N. Bhagwati =

17th Chief Justice of India

Prafullachandra Bhagwati
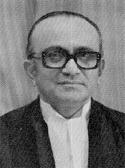

17th Chief Justice of India
- In office 12 July 1985 – 20 December 1986
- Appointed by: Giani Zail Singh
- Preceded by: Y. V. Chandrachud
- Succeeded by: R. S. Pathak

Judge of Supreme Court of India
- In office 17 July 1973 – 11 July 1985
- Nominated by: A. N. Ray
- Appointed by: V. V. Giri

5th Chief Justice of Gujarat High Court
- In office 16 September 1967 – 17 July 1973
- Nominated by: K. N. Wanchoo
- Appointed by: Zakir Hussain
- Preceded by: N. M. Miabhoy
- Succeeded by: B. J. Diwan

Judge of Gujarat High Court
- In office 21 July 1960 – 15 September 1967
- Nominated by: B. P. Sinha
- Appointed by: Rajendra Prasad

Personal details
- Born: Prafullachandra Natwarlal Bhagwati; 21 December 1921 Ahmedabad, Bombay Presidency, British India
- Died: 15 June 2017 (aged 95) New Delhi, India
- Spouse: Prabhavati Shethji
- Children: 3
- Parent: Natwarlal H. Bhagwati (father)
- Relatives: Jagdish Bhagwati (brother); Padma Desai (sister-in-law); Shardul S. Shroff (son-in-law)
- Education: Bombay University, Government Law College, Bombay

Prafullachandra Natwarlal Bhagwati (21 December 1921 – 15 June 2017) was an Indian jurist, who served as the 17th Chief Justice of India, serving from 12 July 1985 until his retirement on 20 December 1986. He introduced the concepts of public interest litigation and absolute liability in India, and for this reason is held, along with Justice V. R. Krishna Iyer, to be a pioneer of judicial activism in the country. He is the longest-served supreme court judge (including Chief Justice to tenure) in India.

== Early and personal life ==
P. N. Bhagwati was born in Gujarat. His father was Justice Natwarlal H. Bhagwati, a Supreme Court judge. He was the elder brother of the economist Jagdish Bhagwati and the neurosurgeon/president of the Neurological Society of India S. N. Bhagwati - father of economist Ketki Bhagwati. He was married to Prabhavati (née Shethji) and the couple have three daughters, Parul, Pallavi, and Sonali. Pallavi is currently the managing partner of leading Indian law firm Shardul Amarchand Mangaldas & Co and is married to Shardul S. Shroff, the chairman of the same law firm. Bhagwati was a devotee of the popular Indian guru Sathya Sai Baba, and was also a member of Sathya Sai Trust till his death.

Bhagwati received his education in Mumbai. He studied at Elphinstone College, taking a Mathematics (Hons.) degree from Bombay University in 1941. In 1942, he courted arrest during the Indian Independence Movement and went underground for four months. He later received a law degree from Bombay University after studying at Government Law College, Bombay.

== Career ==
Bhagwati began his career practicing at the Bombay High Court. In July 1960, he was appointed a judge of the Gujarat High Court. In September 1967, he was appointed the Chief Justice of that court. On two occasions, he acted temporarily as Governor of Gujarat (7 December 1967 to 25 December 1967 and 17 March 1973 to 3 April 1973). In July 1973, he was appointed a Judge of the Supreme Court of India. In August 1985, he became Chief Justice of India. Over the course of his Supreme Court tenure, Bhagwati authored 342 judgments and sat on 820 benches.

As a supreme court judge, Bhagwati introduced the concepts of public interest litigation and absolute liability to the Indian judicial system. He is therefore held, along with Justice V. R. Krishna Iyer, to have pioneered judicial activism in the country.

Chief Justice Bhagwati had an expansive view of the judicial role, saying in an interview that "I practically rewrote Part III and Part IV of the Constitution. I moulded the law. I still remember those days. It was a thrilling experience."

In 2007 Bhagwati was awarded the Padma Vibhushan in public affairs, India's second highest civilian award.

== Judgements ==
=== Habeas corpus case controversy ===
A controversial judgement of Bhagwati was in the ADM Jabalpur v. Shivkant Shukla case (popularly referred to as the ADM Jabalpur case or the habeas corpus case) where he decreed that during the Emergency of 1975 to 1977, a person's right to not be unlawfully detained (i.e. habeas corpus) can be suspended. This judgement received a lot of criticism since it reduced the importance attached to Fundamental Rights under the Indian Constitution. Going against the previous decision of High Courts, the bench which included Bhagwati concluded in favour of the then Indira Gandhi government while only Justice Hans Raj Khanna was opposed to it. Bhagwati openly praised Indira Gandhi during the Emergency period, later criticized her when Janata Party-led government was formed, and again backed Gandhi when she got re-elected to form government in 1980. Bhagwati was criticized for these change of stands, favouring the ruling government, which were deemed as to have been taken to better his career prospects. Bhagwati later in 2011 agreed with popular opinion that this judgement was short-sighted and "apologised".

=== Maneka Gandhi vs Union of India ===
Maneka Gandhi was requested, through an official letter from the Regional Passport Officer, Delhi on 2 July 1977 to return her passport within seven days "in public interest" under section 10(3) of The Passports Act (1967). Gandhi, who had been issued Indian passport on 1 June 1976, in return asked the office to give a statement of reason in accordance with section 10(5) to which the office replied that "in the interest of general public" the Government had decided to not furnish any such statement further. Under Article 21 of the Indian Constitution, which deals with Right to Freedom, Gandhi filed a writ petition in which Bhagwati and Justice V. R. Krishna Iyer ruled in favour of Gandhi.

== Other activities ==
In 1982, Bhagwati was elected a fellow of the American Academy of Arts and Sciences while being affiliated with the Columbia University. He had been a member of the United Nations Human Rights Committee from 1995 to 2009, being re-elected after every two years on expiry of his term. He was also chairman of the committee in 2001-03. As of 2006, he had also served as a member of the Committee of Experts of the International Labour Organization for over 27 years. He was appointed Chancellor of Sri Sathya Sai Institute of Higher Learning on 6 May 2011.

== Death ==
Justice Bhagwati died on 15 June 2017 at the age of 95 after a brief illness at his home in New Delhi. His funeral was held on 17 June. Prime Minister Narendra Modi condoled his death, calling him "stalwart of India's legal fraternity".
