= Y. V. Chandrachud =

16th Chief Justice of India (1978-1985)

Hon'ble Chief Justice (Retd.) Yeshwant Vishnu Chandrachud
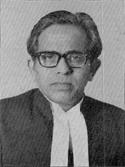

16th Chief Justice of India
- In office 22 February 1978 – 11 July 1985
- Appointed by: Neelam Sanjiva Reddy
- Preceded by: M. H. Beg
- Succeeded by: P. N. Bhagwati

Judge of Supreme Court of India
- In office 28 August 1972 – 21 February 1978
- Nominated by: Sarv Mittra Sikri
- Appointed by: V. V. Giri

Judge of Bombay High Court
- In office 19 March 1961 – 27 August 1972
- Nominated by: B. P. Sinha
- Appointed by: Rajendra Prasad

Personal details
- Born: 12 July 1920 Pune, Bombay Presidency, British India
- Died: 14 July 2008 (aged 88) Mumbai, Maharashtra, India
- Spouse: Prabha
- Children: Dhananjaya Y. Chandrachud
- Education: Elphinstone College; ILS Law College (LL.B); Bombay University (LL.M)
- Occupation: Judge; advocate

Yeshwant Vishnu Chandrachud (12 July 1920 – 14 July 2008) was an Indian jurist who served as the 16th Chief Justice of India, serving from 22 February 1978 until 11 July 1985. Born in Pune in the Bombay Presidency, he was first appointed a judge of the Supreme Court of India on 28 August 1972 and is the longest-serving Chief Justice in India's history at 7 years and 4 months. His nickname was Iron Hands after his well-regarded unwillingness to let anything slip past him.

== Tenure as Chief Justice of India ==
Justice Chandrachud was appointed Chief Justice of India during the term of the Janata government, under Prime Minister Morarji Desai. During his tenure as Chief Justice, he sent Sanjay Gandhi to jail in the "Kissa Kursi Ka" case. When Indira Gandhi's Congress government came back to power a few years later, Chandrachud became a strong opponent of the government, and was known for staunchly defending the independence of the judiciary. The Indian-born Canadian scholar Bhagwan D. Dua wrote later on:

"Though the entire judicial system was pressured to conform, the ruling party zeroed its attack on the pater familias. Unlike Justice Bhagwati, who was labeled as a Congress (I) man for his laudatory letter to Mrs. Gandhi, Chief Justice Chandrachud had a very low rating with the ruling household. Appointed Chief Justice of the Supreme Court of India by the Janata government – a disqualification in itself under the new regime – Chandrachud had not exactly endeared himself to the Gandhis for sending Sanjay to jail in 1978 or for turning volte face during the Janata period. By mid-1981, the estrangement between Chandrachud and the ruling party was so great that Ashoke Sen, a Congress (I) MP and the President of the Supreme Court Bar Association, even hinted at his impeachment by Parliament. Undaunted, the Chief Justice continued to defend the judiciary against executive interference and called upon the Bench and Bar to be united as this was 'the only way we could fight the provocation and attack on the judges'....Throughout 1980, the Chief Justice had refused to submit to pressures and made the government appoint eight chief justices to High Courts (and five judges to the Supreme Court) according to well-established constitutional practices."

Over the course of his Supreme Court tenure, Chandrachud authored 338 judgments.

== The Habeas Corpus case ==
In one of the most notable cases in Indian constitutional history, during the Indian Emergency (1975-1977) of Indira Gandhi, a bench constituted of the five most senior judges of the Supreme court of India heard the famous Habeas Corpus case (A.D.M. Jabalpur vs. Shukla), where detenues under the restrictive Maintenance of Internal Security Act had argued that the Right to Life and Liberty (article 21 in the Indian constitution) could not be suspended even during periods of national emergency. The Indian constitution during that time itself provided that all fundamental rights, including the right to life under article 21 of the constitution, could be suspended during an Emergency. The Habeas Corpus majority decision therefore deferred to the original intent of the framers of India's constitution. However, the Indira Gandhi government flagrantly misused their powers during the Emergency, and as a result, the doctrine of "original intent" has never taken a firm hold in India.

Despite widespread high court support for Habeas Corpus, Justice Chandrachud went along with Justices A.N. Ray, P.N. Bhagwati, and M.H. Beg, to reject this position, stating: in view of the Presidential Order dated 27 June 1975 no person has any locus to move any writ petition under Article 226 before a High Court for habeas corpus or any other writ or order or direction to challenge the legality of an order of detention. The only dissenting opinion was from Justice H. R. Khanna, who has been widely acclaimed for his dissent.

== Minerva Mills Case ==
In the Minerva Mills case, the Supreme Court provided key clarifications on the interpretation of the basic structure doctrine. The court unanimously ruled that the power of the Parliament of India to amend the constitution is limited by the constitution. Hence the parliament cannot exercise this limited power to grant itself an unlimited power. In addition, a majority of the court also held that the parliament's power to amend is not a power to destroy. Hence the parliament cannot emasculate the fundamental rights of individuals, including the right to liberty and equality.

== The Shah Bano case ==
In the Shah Bano case, the bench headed by Chief Justice Chandrachud, invoked a provision in The Criminal Procedure Code, 1973 to order maintenance compensation to the divorced Muslim woman.

This case caused the Rajiv Gandhi government, with its absolute majority, to pass the Muslim Women (Protection of Rights on Divorce) Act, 1986 which diluted the judgment of the Supreme Court.

== Other judgments ==
Other important judgments by Chief Justice Chandrachud include:

- Chandrachud Commission
- Olga Tellis and ors Vs. Bombay Municipal Corporation and ors
- Geetha and Sanjay Chopra murder case in August 1978 in Delhi by Billa and Ranga

== Personal life ==
Y. V. Chandrachud was born on 12 July 1920 in Pune, India (now part of Maharashtra, India) into a prominent Marathi family. His native village is Kanhersar located in Khed Taluka of Pune District. Chandrachud was educated at Nutan Marathi Vidyalaya high school, Elphinstone College and the ILS Law College, Pune. He was also one of the earliest LLM graduates at Bombay University. Justice Y.V. Chandrachud died on 14 July 2008 shortly after he was admitted to the Bombay Hospital. He is survived by his wife Prabha, his son Dhananjaya Y. Chandrachud, former Chief Justice of India and his daughter Nirmala. His grandsons, Abhinav Chandrachud, a lawyer in Bombay high court and Chintan Chandrachud, a legal scholar and writer.

Legal offices
Preceded by Mirza Hameedullah Beg	Chief Justice of India; 22 February 1978 – 11 July 1985	Succeeded by Prafullachandra Natwarlal Bhagwati
