= Haresh Jagtiani =

Indian attorney

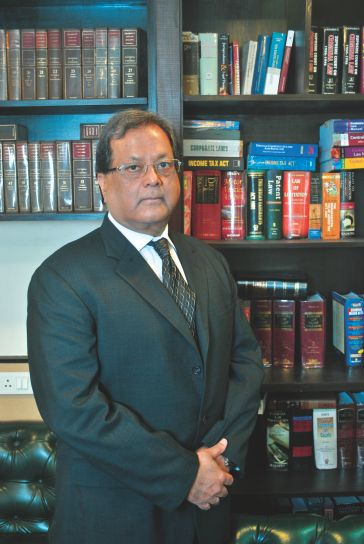
- Occupations: Lawyer, Senior Advocate
- Known for: Expertise in Litigation and Arbitration

Haresh Jagtiani is an attorney in India with experience in Litigation and Arbitration. He is the founder of the law firm Haresh Jagtiani & Associates which is now called Oasis Counsel & Advisory.

== Education ==
Jagtiani completed his master's degree in Constitutional and International law from India Government College in 1971 and was designated a Senior Advocate in India in 1994 (equivalent to Queen's Counsel in England).

Jagtiani is a member of the Supreme Court Bar Association of India, the Bombay Bar Association and the Bar Council of Maharashtra & Goa. He is also a member of The Board of Trustees of ING Investment Management and the Indian division of ING Bank, among other institutions.

During the course of his career, Jagtiani has been Counsel for several large foreign and Indian banks and multinational corporations. He recently was also an Independent Director on the Board of Bharat Petroleum Corporation Ltd.

== Clients ==
Jagtiani has represented clients in commercial, criminal, constitutional, civil, maritime and matrimonial disputes, as well as in disputes relating to income tax, power and electricity, intellectual property rights, and customs, excise and other indirect taxes.

Jagtiani has also successfully represented clients at various fora including the Indian Council of Arbitration, the International Chamber of Commerce (ICC), the London Court of International Arbitration (LCIA), the Singapore International Arbitration Centre (SIAC) and the Dubai International Arbitration Centre (DIAC).

Jagtiani's corporate clients have included prominent names such as Unitech, Pantaloon Retail, Indian Overseas Bank, Oriental Bank of Commerce, BNP Paribas, Crompton Greaves, Cable Corporation of India and Lupin. Haresh Jagtiani has also represented numerous public figures, including Late Shri Madhavrao Scindia, cricketers Sachin Tendulkar and Mohinder Amarnath, jockey Pesi Shroff and film personalities, to name a few.
