= Cyril Amarchand Mangaldas =

Indian law firm

- Headquarters: Mumbai, Maharashtra, India
- No. of offices: 10
- No. of lawyers: 1200
- No. of employees: 1700
- Major practice areas: General Practice
- Key people: Cyril Shroff (Managing Partner)
- Date founded: 2015; 11 years ago (By Split)
- Founder: Cyril Shroff
- Company type: Partnership
- Website: www.cyrilshroff.com

Cyril Amarchand Mangaldas is a full service Indian law firm, with its headquarters in Mumbai, India. The firm came into existence on 11 May 2015 from its predecessor Amarchand & Mangaldas & Suresh A Shroff & Co.

== Offices ==
The firm has offices in various locations in India and other countries; Mumbai, Delhi-NCR, Bengaluru, Ahmedabad, Hyderabad, Chennai, GIFT City, Singapore and Abu Dhabi. As of 20th July 2025 the firm had 1200 lawyers and 220 partners.

== Advisory board ==
The advisory board is composed of N. R. Narayana Murthy, cofounder of Infosys; Deepak Parekh, chairman at Housing Development Finance Corporation, Uday Kotak, executive vice chairman and MD at Kotak Mahindra Bank; Janmejaya Sinha, chairman at Boston Consulting Group Asia Pacific, and Umakanth Varottil, assistant professor in the faculty of law at the National University of Singapore.
