= Wilson College =

Wilson College may refer to:

- Wilson College (Pennsylvania), Chambersburg, Pennsylvania, United States
- Warren Wilson College, Asheville, North Carolina, United States
- Lindsey Wilson College, Columbia, Kentucky, United States
- Wilson College, the original name of First College at Princeton University, Princeton, New Jersey, United States
- Wilson College, Mumbai, India
- Wilson College, California, precursor to the University of Southern California, in Wilmington, Los Angeles
