= Trimbak Krishna Tope =

Indian lawyer and teacher (1914–1994)

Trimbak Krishnarao Tope (popularly known as Dr. T. K. Tope) (28 February 1914 - 21 February 1994), was an authority on Constitutional Law, a noted educationist, a biographer, an Indian lawyer, and teacher. He was Principal of the Government Law College, Mumbai from 1958 to 1975. He served as the Vice-Chancellor of Bombay University from 1971 to 1977. Tope was the Sheriff of Mumbai from 10 December 1985 – 20 December 1986. He participated in the 1930 and 1942 movements.

== Bibliography ==
- Dotivala, Godrej N. (1990). Sir Pherozeshah Mehta Memorial Volume. Mayor's Fund Committee.
- The International Who's Who, 1997-98. Europa Publications. 1997. ISBN 9781857430226.
