= Dinshah Fardunji Mulla =

Indian lawyer, legal writer, and judge (1868-1934)

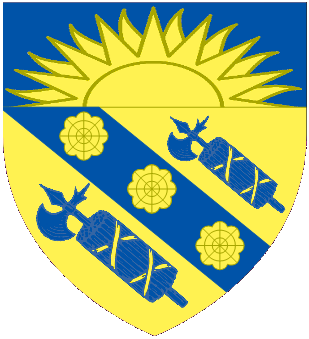
Shield of arms as displayed at Lincoln's Inn. Motto: Vohu Manah

Sir Dinshah Fardunji Mulla CIE (1868 – 26 April 1934), also known as Dinshaw Mulla, was an Indian lawyer, legal writer, and judge. D.F Mulla was an Attorney-at-Law of the Bombay High Court, a professor of law at Government Law College, Bombay and a member of the Judicial Committee of the Privy Council, India.

Born in 1868 in Bombay to a family of merchants, he spent his childhood and teenage years in the family residence in Onlooker Mansion, Borabazar. After having studied law at Government Law College, he enrolled as an articled clerk with an English solicitor in 1892. He founded the firm Mulla & Mulla with his brother Eruchshaw Mulla in 1895, whence they operated initially from a small office in Readymoney Mansion until moving in to what is now Mulla House, in 1898. Mulla & Mulla would go on to eventually buy out Mulla House from the Petit family in 1912. In 1949, Mulla & Mulla would merge with the firm of English solicitors, Craigie Blunt & Caroe, who were based out of Ballard Estate and had a roaring admiralty and maritime practice.

Mulla was knighted 5 April 1930. He was appointed a Privy Counsellor in 1930 during the reign of King George V, serving on the Judicial Committee from January 1931. He was the assistant editor of Pollock’s Commentaries on Indian Contract Act. Though he belonged to the Zoroastrian religion, he published on Sharia law. His Principles of Mahomedan Law is a well-known Hanafi law text that discusses the application of sharia law in India and Pakistan.

== Works ==
1. Commentaries on the Code of Civil Procedure code
2. Jurisdiction of Courts in the matters relating to rights and power of cases
3. The law of insolvency in British India
4. Principles of Mahomedan Law. 1905. OCLC 35765.
5. Principles of Hindu Law. 1912. OCLC 16519845.
6. Indian Contract Act
7. Hindu Law relates to religious and charitable trust
8. The Registration Act
9. The Key to Indian Practice
