= Janmejaya Sinha =

Indian Economist and author

Janmejaya Kumar Sinha
- Janmejaya Kumar Sinha
- Born: 12 September 1959 (age 67); India
- Citizenship: Indian
- Education: Delhi University (B.A., M.A. History); University of Cambridge (B.A., M.A. Economics); Princeton University (PhD)
- Occupations: Management consultant, economist, author
- Employer: Boston Consulting Group
- Title: Chairman of Boston Consulting Group India

Janmejaya Kumar Sinha (born September 12, 1959) is an Indian economist and author who is the present chairman of Boston Consulting Group (BCG) India. He was previously chairman of BCG Asia Pacific between 2009 and 2018. In 2010, he was considered among the 25 most influential consultants in the world. He is a member of several government committees.

== Career ==
Janmejaya Sinha has a B.A. and an M.A. in history from St. Stephen's College Delhi University. In 1984, he won the INLAKS scholarship to pursue a B.A. and an M.A. in economics from Clare College, Cambridge University. He also has a PhD from Princeton University's Woodrow Wilson School of Public and International Affairs.

Prior to joining Boston Consulting Group (BCG) in 1998, Sinha worked with the Reserve Bank of India (RBI) in Calcutta, Mumbai and Patna. He also briefly worked for the World Bank. He was managing director of BCG's India Practice between 2003 and 2009, and then chairman of BCG Asia Pacific from 2009 to 2018. A member of the firm's executive committee from 2006 to 2018, Sinha is the current chairman of BCG India. In 2010, Consulting Magazine considered him to be among the 25 most influential consultants in the world.

Sinha is currently co-chairman of a Confederation of Indian Industry (CII) economic affairs committee. He has been a member of several committees set up by the Government of India, such as a NITI Aayog committee to promote the use of digital payment systems, and he is the chairman of the Securities and Exchange Board of India's Alternative Investment Policy Advisory Committee (AIPAC). He was previously a member of the Planning Commission's Panel of Experts on Reforms in Central Public Sector Enterprises. Following Prime Minister Narendra Modi's 2025 Independence Day speech, Sinha was appointed to a high-level reform committee chaired by Rajiv Gauba.

Sinha has also been on committees for RBI, such as the Advisory Panel on Institutions and Market Structure, the Indian Banks Association, and the Confederation of Indian Industry. He is a regular speaker at the World Economic Forum and also at industry summits of Confederation of Indian Industry, Federation of Indian Chambers of Commerce and Industry, and Nasscom. He is a contributor to the press and has written for the Hindustan Times, the Indian Express, The Economic Times, The Financial Express, Business Standard, and Mint.

Sinha is on the board of trustees of the Council On Energy, Environment and Water, the Infravision Foundation, and the Ananta Centre. He previously served on the advisory board of Murugappa Group. He is co-author of several books including Your Strategy Needs A Strategy (2015) and Untangling Conflict: An Introspective Guide for Families in Business (2022).
