= Shardul Amarchand Mangaldas & Co =

Indian law firm

- Headquarters: New Delhi and Mumbai
- No. of offices: 7
- No. of lawyers: 884 lawyers, 188 partners
- No. of employees: 1158
- Major practice areas: General Practice
- Key people: Shardul S. Shroff, Pallavi Shroff, Akshay Chudasama
- Date founded: 11 May 2015 (Amarchand Mangaldas-1917)
- Founder: Dr. Shardul S. Shroff
- Company type: Partnership
- Website: www.amsshardul.com

Shardul Amarchand Mangaldas & Co is a full service Indian law firm and is one of the largest law firms of India. The firm came into existence after its predecessor Amarchand & Mangaldas & Suresh A Shroff & Co was split into two after a dispute emerged between the two managing partners of firm who were heading the Delhi and Mumbai office separately.

SAM, as it is popularly now known, is considered as Tier 1 law firm, having been ranked amongst the top 3 Law firms in almost all major practice areas. The firm regularly advises some of the largest MNCs, Private Equity Funds and Indian corporate houses. Before its split, Amarchand Mangaldas was India’s biggest law firm with over 600 lawyers. AMSS, as it was then called, was established in 1917.

== Locations ==
The firm has 7 offices at New Delhi, Gurugram, Mumbai, Ahmedabad, Bengaluru, Chennai and Kolkata.

== Management ==
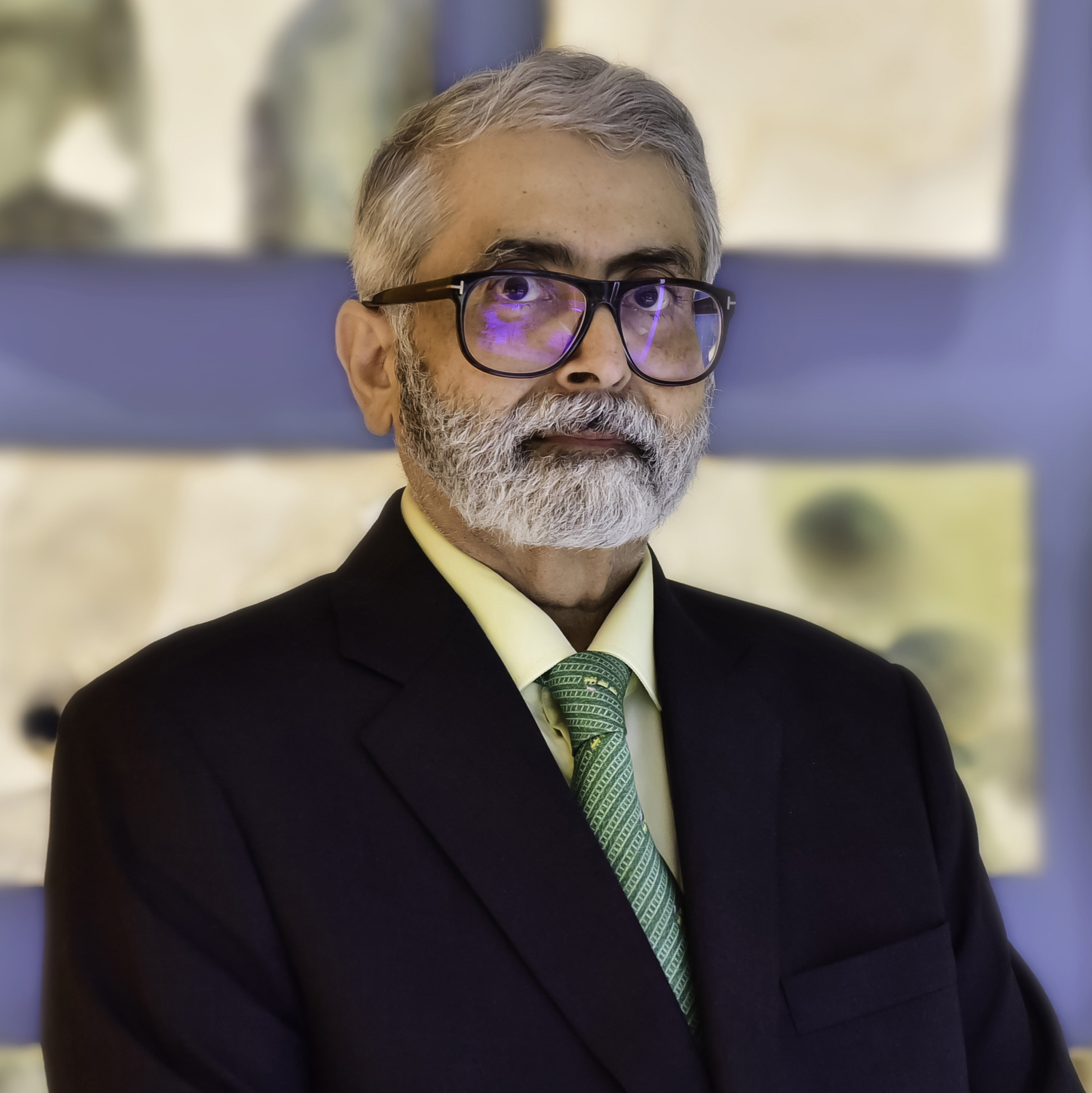
Shardul Shroff, Executive Chairman of Mangaldas.

Mangaldas is among several leading Indian law practices that are family-led businesses. Dr. Shardul S. Shroff is the executive chairman of the firm while his wife Pallavi Shroff and Akshay Chudasama are the managing partners of the firm. The management board of the firm includes Dr. Shardul S. Shroff, Pallavi Shroff, Akshay Chudasama, equity partners Gunjan Shah, Jatin Aneja, Raghubir Menon, Prashant Gupta, Naval Satarwala Chopra and Shweta Shroff.
