= Carrefour =

French multinational retail and wholesaling corporation

Carrefour S.A.
- Type: Public company
- Traded as: Euronext Paris: CA; CAC 40 Component
- ISIN: FR0000120172
- Industry: Retail; Wholesaling
- Founded: 1 January 1958; 68 years ago
- Founders: Marcel Fournier; Denis Defforey; Jacques Defforey
- Headquarters: Massy, France
- Number of locations: ▲14,000 stores (2024): ▲ France: 5,619; ▼ Italy: 1,489 (exiting operations); ▲ Spain: 1,474; ▲ Turkey: 1,250 (divestment underway); ▲ Belgium: 792; ▼ Poland 755 (exiting operations); ▼ Brazil: 508; ▼ Argentina: 485; ▼ Romania: 365 (exiting operations); ▼ Taiwan: 328; ▲ Israel: 50; ▲ French territories and the Dominican Republic: 180; ▲ Other: 1,525; Retail network; ▲ hypermarkets: 1,130; ▲ supermarkets: 3,574; ▲ convenience: 8,642; ▼ cash and carry: 440; soft discount: 108
- Area served: Worldwide
- Key people: Alexandre Bompard (chairman & CEO); Matthieu Malige (CFO)
- Services: Hypermarket, supercenter, superstore, supermarket, cash and carry, warehouse club
- Revenue: ▼€83.9 billion (FY25)
- Operating income: ▼€2.14 billion (FY25)
- Net income: ▼€437 million (FY25)
- Total assets: ▼€55.2 billion (FY25)
- Total equity: ▼€11.2 billion (FY25)
- Number of employees: ▼298,604 (FY25)
- Website: carrefour.com

Carrefour Group, S.A. (French: Groupe Carrefour, [kaʁfuʁ]) is a French multinational retail and wholesaling corporation headquartered in Massy, France. It operates a chain of hypermarkets, grocery stores and convenience stores. By 2024, the group had 14,000 stores in 40 countries. It is the seventh-largest retailer in the world by revenue.

== History ==
The first Carrefour shop (not a hypermarket) opened in 1960, within suburban Annecy, near a crossroads (hence the name ― carrefour means crossroads in French). The group was created in 1959 by Marcel Fournier, Denis Defforey and Jacques Defforey, who were influenced by several seminars in the United States led by Bernardo Trujillo.

The Carrefour group was the first in Europe to open a hypermarket: a large supermarket and a department store under the same roof. They opened their first hypermarket on 15 June 1963 in Sainte-Geneviève-des-Bois, near Paris.

In 1969, the company began opening its first stores beyond national borders, starting with neighboring Belgium. During the 1970s, it started developing its retail network across other continents as well.

In 1999, it merged with the Promodès group through a stock swap. On the Italian market, where it had been present since 1972, it acquired the Generale Supermercati (GS) and DìPerDì networks in 2000, progressively replacing their branding; from 2009, it began to focus on the central-northern area of the country. Its presence in the south developed mainly through franchising.

From 2008, Carrefour decided to invest in Eastern European countries (primarily Romania and Bulgaria) and China, reaching over 100 stores, and launched several openings in Russia and China with strategic consultancy from Citigroup. However, the expansion project in Russia was shelved in 2009 after the opening of a megastore in Moscow, an area that boasted a per capita income twice the national average but was, at the same time, a market that had reached the limit of its potential.

In May 2011, Carrefour decided to invest €1.5 billion ($2.22 billion) to introduce the supermarket concept of Carrefour Planet in Western Europe.

On 9 June 2017, the board of directors chose Alexandre Bompard as its new chairman and chief executive officer as of 18 July 2017.

In 2017, Carrefour began working with a small French start-up focused on food recycling, Expliceat, on a trial basis.

In January 2018, Alexandre Bompard announced a strategic plan for the company, entitled "Carrefour 2022" that included measures for improved food and package sustainability, limitation of food waste, development of organic products, e-commerce partnerships, and two billion euros in annual investments from 2018 as well as organisational and cost reduction measures.

During the COVID-19 pandemic, Carrefour was the first retailer to join the C'est qui le Patron ? initiative to share its additional incomes related to COVID-19 to support people who were suffering from pandemic.

In November 2024, Carrefour's Operations in Jordan were later changed to Hypermax by the Majid Al Futtaim Group. The same happened to Oman, Kuwait, and Bahrain in January 2025.

In January 2025, the Puig & fils group (92 Petit Casino or Vival supermarkets), then in April 2025 the Magne group (101 Petit Casino or Vival supermarkets), announced that it was leaving the Groupe Casino for Carrefour.

On 12 November 2025, the Saadé family — owners of the shipping-group CMA CGM — acquired a 4% stake in the French retail giant Carrefour, becoming its second-largest shareholder and obtaining a board seat from 1 December 2025.

== Financial data ==
Financial data in € billions
Year	2013	2014	2015	2016	2017	2018	2019	2020	2021
Net revenue	74.888	74.706	76.945	76.645	78.897	72.355	72.397	70.719	72.958
Net income	1.263	1.249	0.980	0.746	−0.531	−0.561	1.126	0.641	1.072
Assets	43.564	45.789	45.095	48.845	47.813	47.378	50.802	47.588	47.668
Employees	363,989	381,227	380,920	384,151	378,923	363,862 (Note: Excluding Carrefour China, the number of Group employees would have been around 327,000.)	321,383	322,164	319,565

== Domestic operations ==
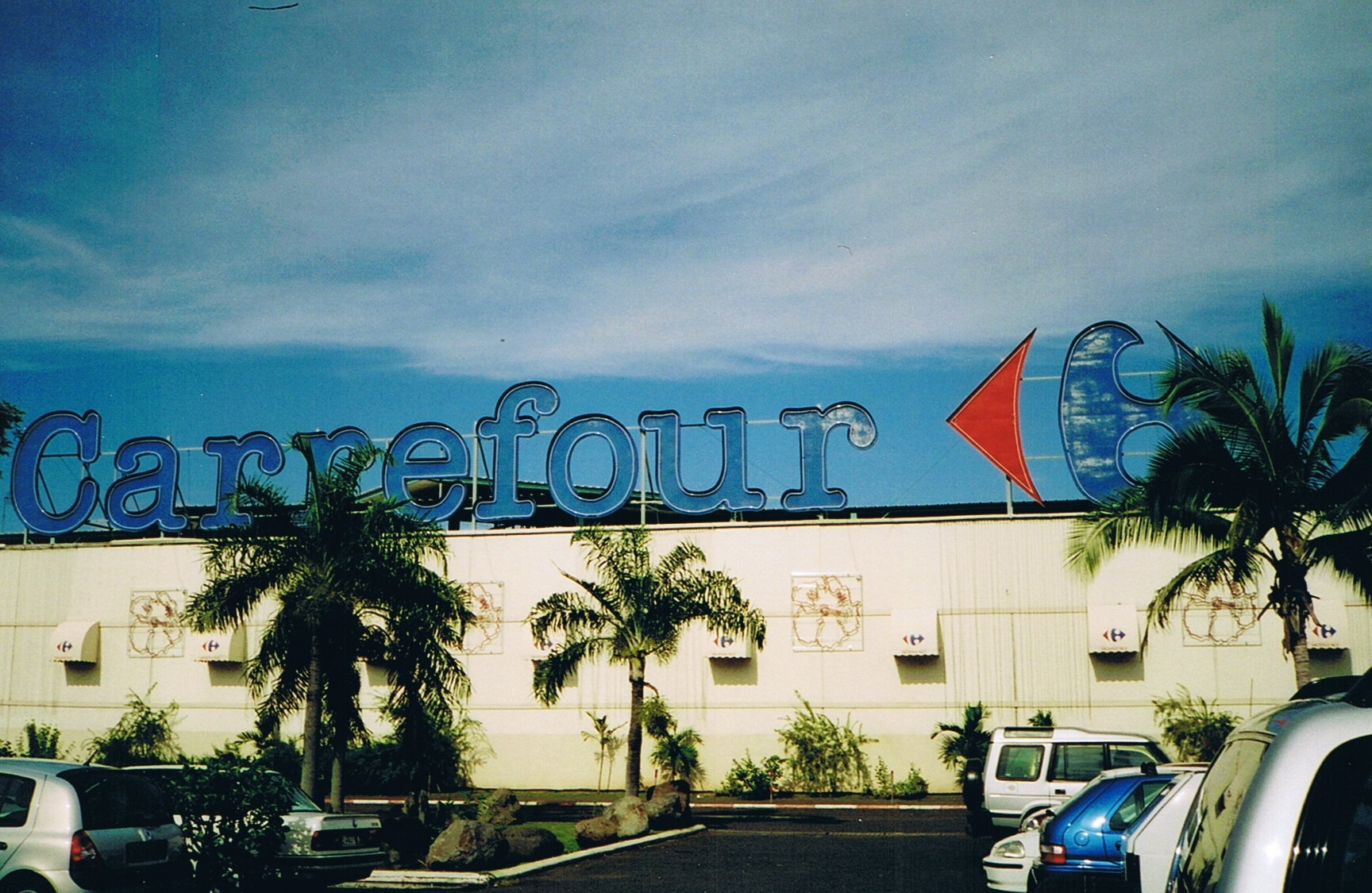
The Carrefour supermarket at Faʼaʼā, Tahiti, French Polynesia

The headquarters of the Groupe Carrefour is in Massy, in the Paris metropolitan area. In 2019, the former Carrefour head office of Boulogne-Billancourt and the Carrefour France division office of Courcouronnes, Essonne, near Évry, were combined at that major location. A secondary head office is located in Mondeville, near Caen (Normandy), which was until 1999 the former Promodès headquarters.

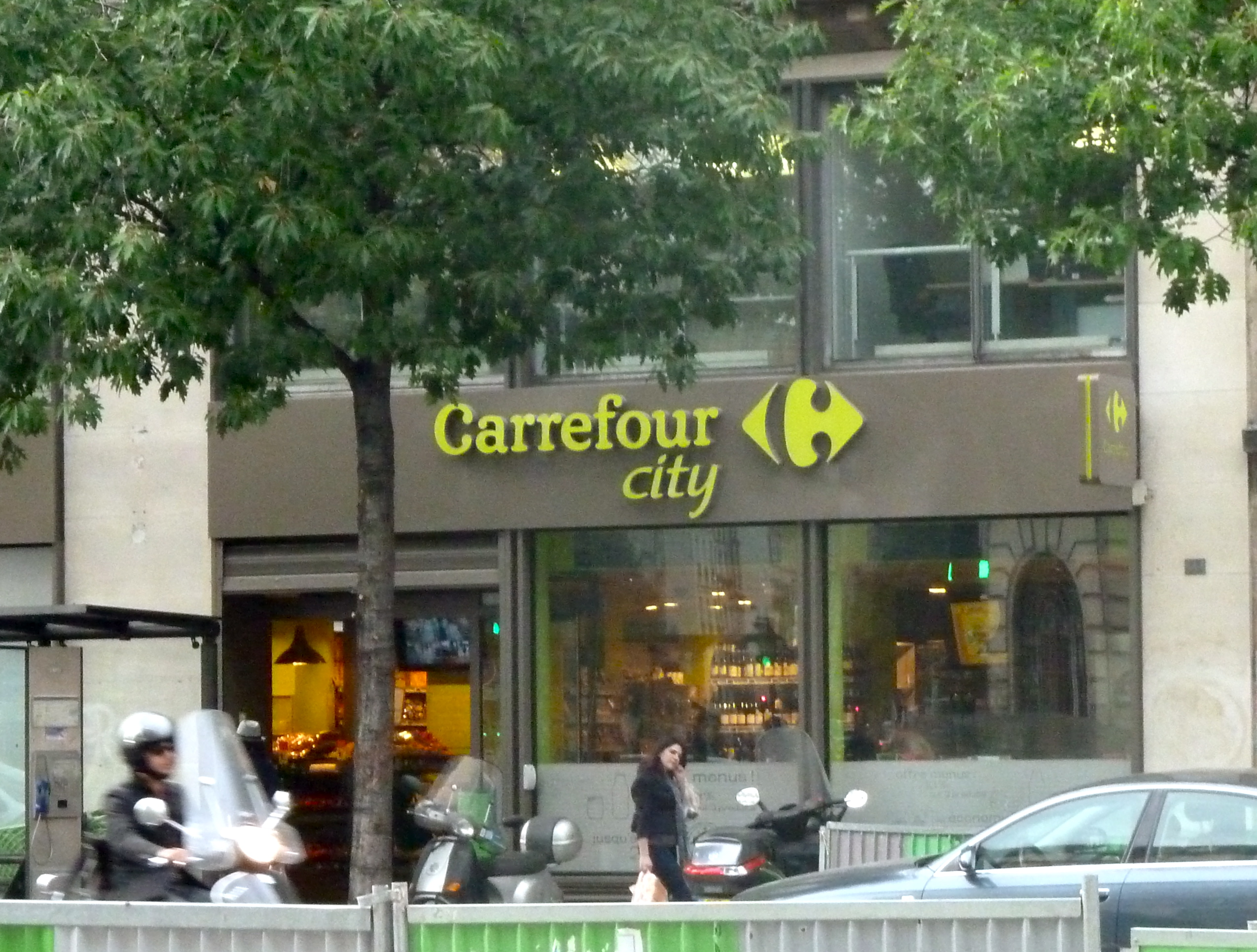
Carrefour City, Paris

In France, Carrefour operates under its name over 230 hypermarkets (from 2500 up to 23000 sq m sales area), 1020 Carrefour Market supermarkets (generally from 1000 up to 4000 sq m), and over 2000 smaller supermarkets and convenience stores under the Carrefour City, Carrefour Contact and Carrefour Express banners.

Carrefour also owns the Promocash Cash&Carry chain (130 locations) and supplies 1500 independent small food stores under the Proxi banner.

In 2019, the group launched its first Supeco soft discount stores, which are so far all located in the French Northern region Hauts-de-France.

In December 2023, Carrefour and Uber decided to team up to get access to the French supermarket chain's charging points for electric vehicles. Uber has invested around $323,400 to allow its VTC (tourist vehicle with drivers) drivers using EVs to charge their cars in the Carrefour Énergies' stations in France.

== International operations ==
Current operations Past operations

By 2024, the group had 14,000 stores in 40 countries.

=== Africa ===
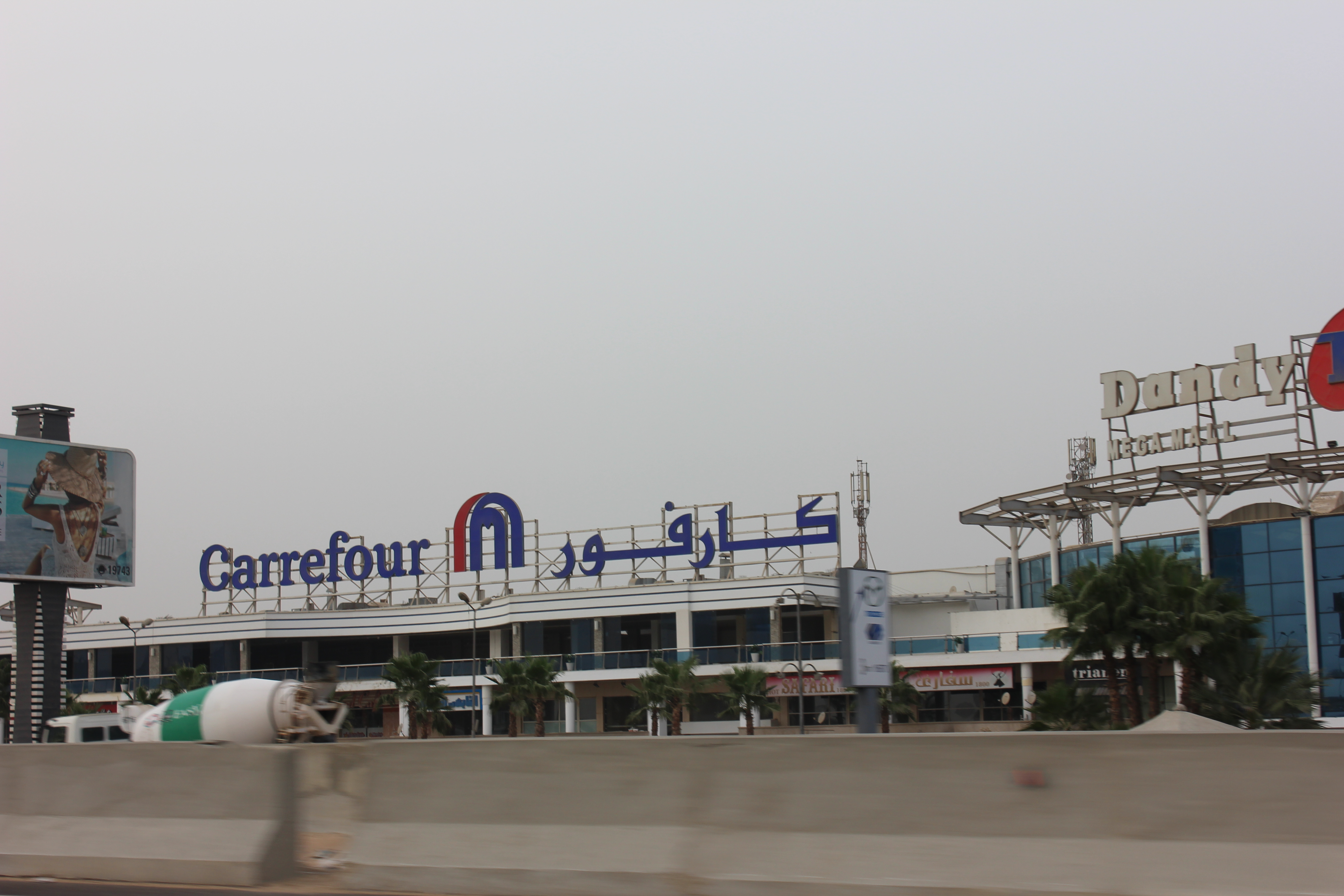
Carrefour at Cairo, Egypt

Tunisia
The first hypermarket opened in 2001.
Egypt
The first hypermarket opened in 2002.
Morocco
The first hypermarket opened in 2009.
Algeria
The first hypermarket opened in 2015.
Ivory Coast
CFAO Group opened the first hypermarket in Playce Shopping Mall in Abidjan in 2015.
Ethiopia
Operations in Ethiopia are expected to commence in 2026 through the signing of a franchise agreement with Midroc Investment Group.
Kenya
The retailer is the anchor client of The Hub Karen Mall where it opened its first Kenyan store in May 2016. A second outlet was opened at Two Rivers Mall in March 2017, soon followed by a third store the Thika Road Mall in November 2017. The fourth outlet was opened at the Junction Mall along Ngong Road in January 2018; the fifth at Sarit Center in April 2018.
In June 2020, Carrefour opened a new store along Uhuru Highway. In September 2020, Carrefour announced plans to continue its expansion efforts by opening three branches in the coastal city of Mombasa. In May 2021 it opened another branch of Carrefour Market in Garden City Mall along the Thika superhighway. It also has a branch at Westgate Mall previously occupied by ShopRite.
Carrefour has 28 outlets in Kenya, largely located in the suburbs of Nairobi. The retailer's expansion into Kenya has benefited from the failure of previously dominant supermarket chains such as Nakumatt and Uchumi as Carrefour rushed in to occupy the retail spaces and market share it vacated.
Cameroon
CFAO Group opened the first supermarket in 2017.
Senegal
CFAO Group opened the first Carrefour Market in Senegal at Point E, Dakar, in January 2019.
Uganda
The first hypermarket opened in 2020. The anchor clients are located at Oasis Mall and Metroplex and are in spaces previously occupied by the Kenyan retail chain Nakumatt.
In September 2021, Carrefour signed an agreement with Shoprite of South Africa for the former to take over six stores that the latter would vacate in Uganda. This has increased Carrefour's presence in the country significantly.
As of 2023, there are six outlets located in Kampala: Acacia Mall (Kissimenti), Arena Mall (Nsambya), Lugogo Mall (Nakawa), Metroplex (Naalya), Oasis Mall (Nakasero) and Village Mall (Bugolobi). One outlet is located in Victoria Mall in Entebbe.
Gabon
In 2021, Carrefour announced the opening of its first store in Libreville with Prix Import as a franchise partner. As of July 2025 there are 9 stores.
Madagascar
The first hypermarket opened in 2021.
Mauritius
The first hypermarket opened in 2024.
Democratic Republic of Congo
The first hypermarket opened in 2025.

=== Asia ===
Armenia
On 11 March 2015 Carrefour opened its first store located in Yerevan Mall, Yerevan. It had around 7,000 m^{2} space (without offices). President Serzh Sargsyan was present at the opening. A second store was opened in Rossia Mall in downtown Yerevan. As of September 2025, Carrefour Armenia has two major stores (hypermarkets / markets) and several smaller "express" shops.
Between 2015 and 2024, Carrefour stores in Armenia were franchised by Majid Al Futtaim Group. In late 2024, Carrefour Armenia changed its franchise to Food Depot LLC and changed its logo to the original French logo.
Pakistan
In 2009, Carrefour opened its first hypermarket in Lahore in a joint venture with Majid Al Futtaim Group, where it achieved 1 billion Pakistani rupees in revenues in its first year. It attracted more than 1 million customers every month. On 14 November 2011, Hyperstar opened its second hypermarket in the country in Karachi. On 22 March 2016, it expanded its operations to Islamabad by opening a 150,000-square-foot (14,000 m^{2}) hypermarket in World Trade Center Islamabad.
Since 20 December 2018, MAF has rebranded Hyperstar to Carrefour across Pakistan. It has plans to expand its stores to other cities including Gujranwala, Multan and Hyderabad. As of June 2019, the group had already invested ₨8 billion and was looking to invest another ₨40 billion in Pakistan. It is operating at least seven hypermarkets (three in Lahore, two in Karachi, one in Islamabad and one in Faisalabad's Lyallpur Galleria) and one superstore in Pakistan.
Mongolia
On 17 February 2023, Carrefour opened its first two stores in the nation's capital Ulaanbaatar, with the partnership of Altan Joloo. As of 7 December 2025, it has 19 stores. The largest branch is at Sila Centre.

==== West Asia ====
Majid Al Futtaim has handled the Carrefour operations in the Middle East and North Africa region since 1995, as the company opened the region's first hypermarket at City Centre Deira – it initially was a Continent-branded store before it converted to Carrefour four years later. As of 2020, Majid Al Futtaim operates over 320 Carrefour stores in 16 countries, serving more than 750,000 customers daily and employing over 37,000 workers.

Iran
In February 2009, MAF opened its first store in Iran, called Iran Hyper Star.
Iraq
Majid al Futtaim opened the first Carrefour in Erbil in 2011. There is also a Family Mall Carrefour Department store in Sulaymaniyah. Along with several other international brands, as of June 2024, Carrefour has opened a branch in the capital city of Baghdad.
Israel
In March 2022, Carrefour signed a franchising agreement with Electra Consumer Products to discontinue the Yeinot Bitan and Mega Ba'ir chains of stores and rebrand them as Carrefour branches.
In July 2023, Carrefour stated that it would not be opening branches in the West Bank.
Lebanon
On 4 April 2013, Majid al Futtaim inaugurated a Carrefour hypermarket at their City Centre Beirut mall, in the Hazmieh suburb of Beirut. In September 2017, a second Carrefour outlet opened at the CityMall Dora, replacing a venue formerly held by a Monop' hypermarket. In June 2018, a third outlet opened at the Tower Center mall in Zouk Mosbeh. In February 2019, a fourth Carrefour, and the first supermarket format venue, opened within the Aley District. The fourth Carrefour is considered a major step for the company's expansion in Lebanon.
Saudi Arabia
In 2004, Carrefour opened its first branch in Saudi Arabia by Majid Al Futtaim.

United Arab Emirates
On 28 November 1995, Carrefour opened its first branch, in City Centre Deira in Dubai by Majid Al Futtaim. The following day, on 29 November 1995, the second branch opened in Airport Road in Abu Dhabi.
On 1 March 2022, Carrefour opened in City Centre Me'aisem in Dubai its first Bio store.

=== Europe (outside France) ===
In 1991, Carrefour established a company in Turkey, and in 1993 it opened its first hypermarket in Istanbul. In 1996, a partnership with the Turkish conglomerate Sabancı Holding was established and all stores were rebranded as CarrefourSA. As of 2025, there are 1,500 stores operating across Turkey.

In 1999, Carrefour entered the Greek market in collaboration with Marinopoulos S.A. Carrefour stopped operating in Greece in 2017 due to its acquisition by the Sklavenitis group. The company reopened in the country in May 2022, and the reactivation of the Carrefour brand in the market will be done in collaboration with Retail & more S.A., a subsidiary of the Teleunicom group.

In 2001, Carrefour entered the Romanian market, expanded into 43 stores. It is one of the top retailers in Romania.

The company operates in Spain under the name of Centros Comerciales Carrefour SA. As of 2019, Carrefour Spain is the 15th most important Spanish company by revenue.

Eight years after bankruptcy (2016), Carrefour returned to Bulgaria under the brands of Carrefour "Market" and "Express". As of June 2024, there are stores open in Varna, Sofia and Burgas.

In December 2023, Carrefour announced the "return of stores and products" of its brand in Bulgaria through the Greek franchisee Retail & More, which will provide "sub-franchising of the Carrefour brand" for at least around 20 stores.

As of February 2026, Carrefour's French division is known to operate 3 stores in Monaco, one each of the standard, Market, and City store types.

=== Americas ===
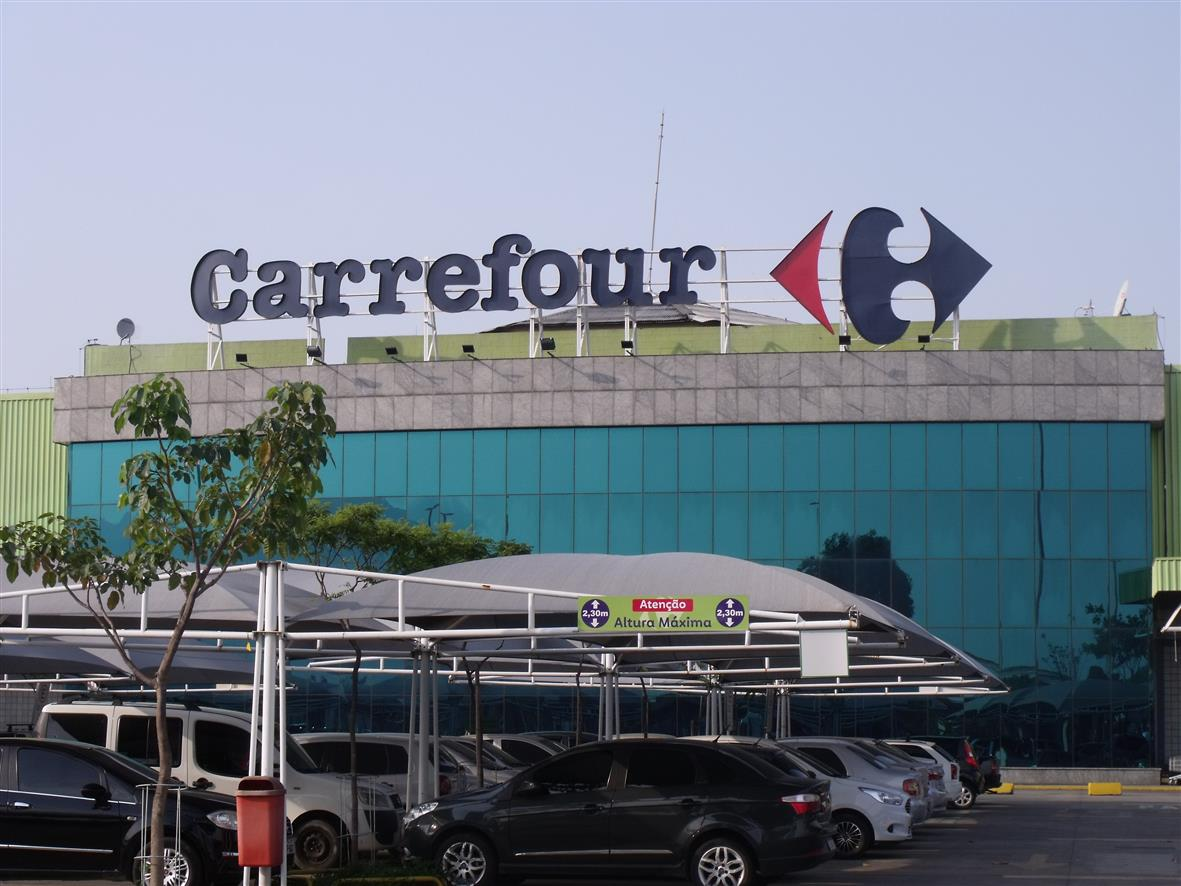
Carrefour at Belford Roxo, Brazil

Argentina
Around 605 stores are in operation in Argentina as of 2021.
Brazil
Carrefour Brazil, the largest market outside France, was founded in 1975 and today is the major supermarket chain in Brazil in competition with Grupo Pão de Açúcar. In 2017, it sells more than 25 million products per year.
Dominican Republic
Carrefour Dominican Republic, opened its first store in Santo Domingo in 2000 and it has expanded to other smaller stores in the city called Carrefour Market and Carrefour City with a total of five stores in 2023.

=== Former international operations ===
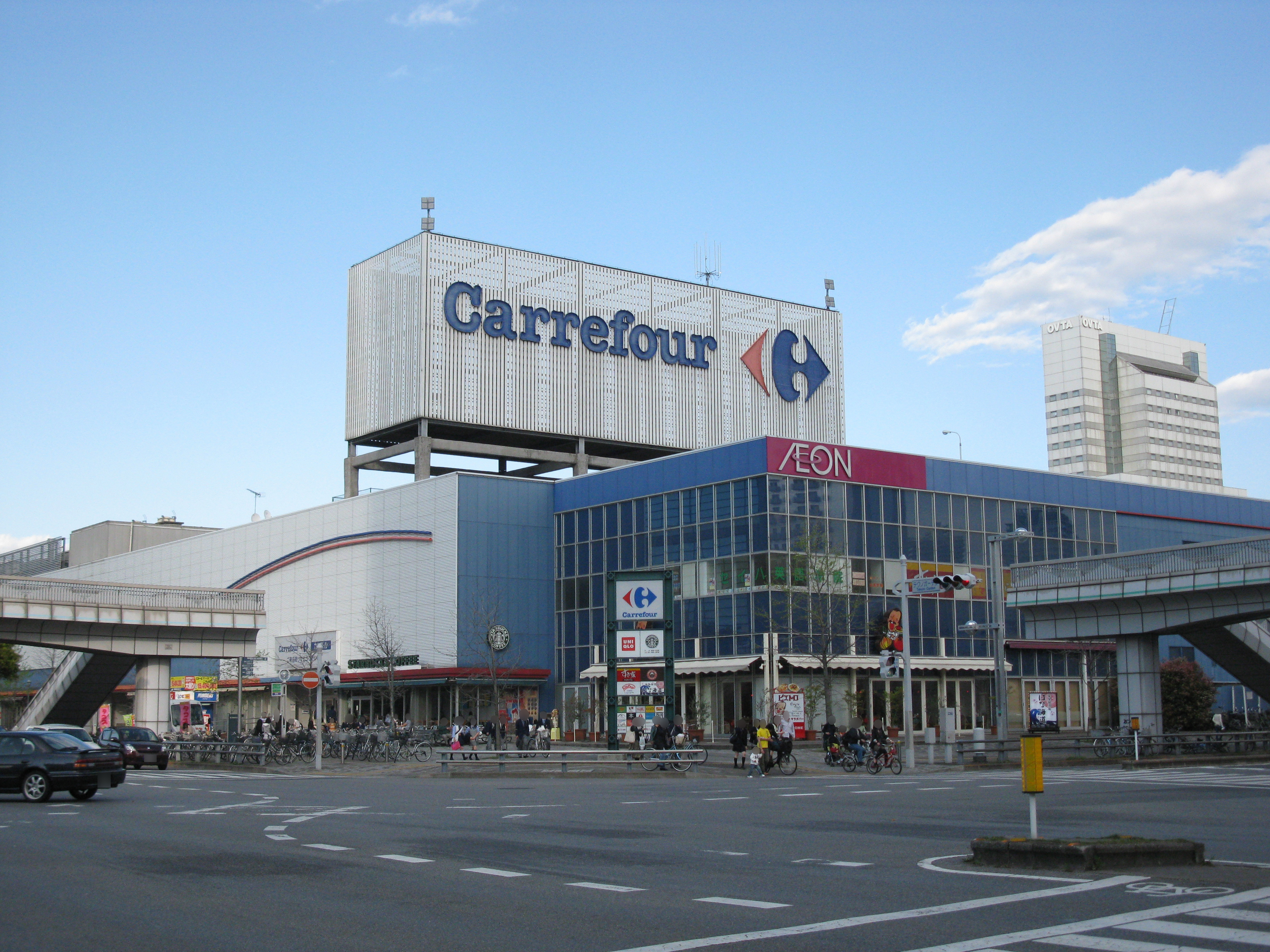
Former Carrefour store at Chiba, Japan

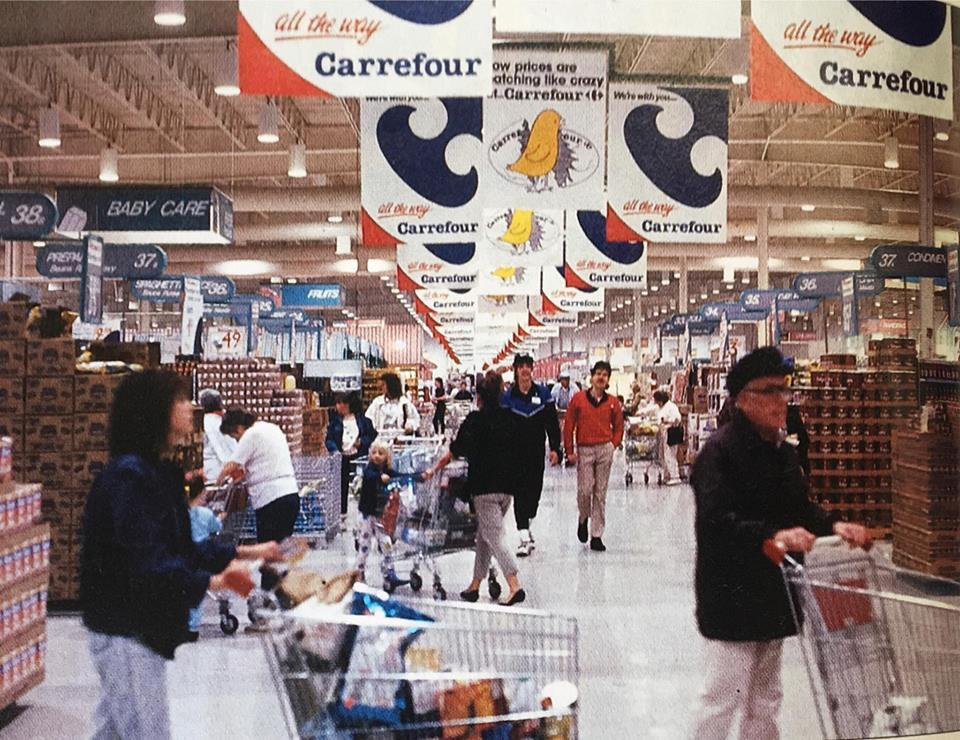
Former Carrefour store in Philadelphia, United States

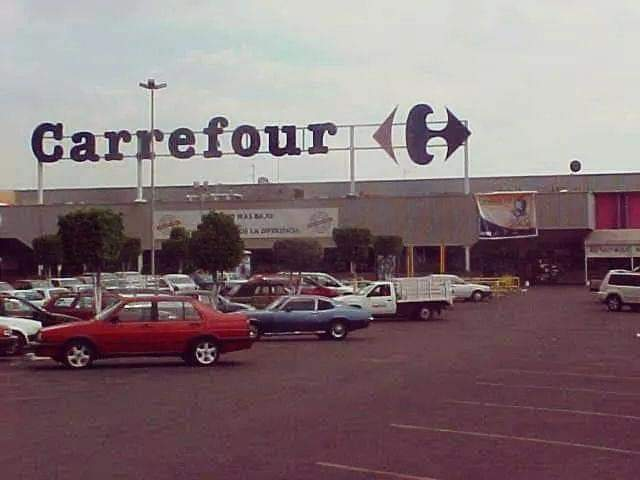
Former Carrefour store in Cuernavaca, Mexico

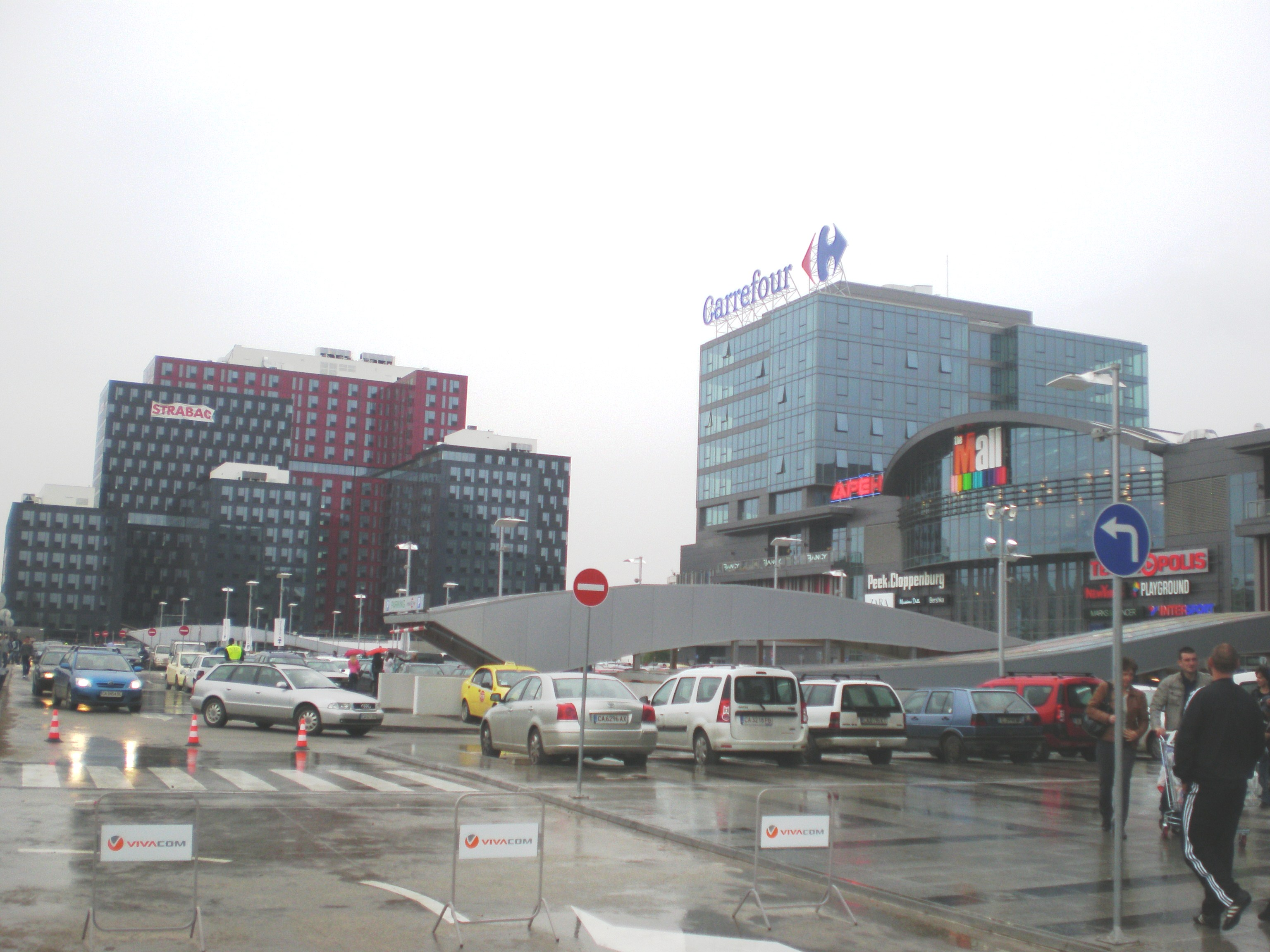
Former Carrefour store in Bulgaria within The Mall shopping center in Sofia, Bulgaria, opened in early 2010

Albania
In July 2011, Carrefour announced that its first hypermarket in Albania would be opening in November 2011, the hypermarket later opened at the Tirana East Gate mall. In 2016, all Carrefour stores in Albania were sold and then converted to SPAR.
Austria
In 1976 Carrefour opened a store in the Shopping City Süd at the southern edge of Vienna. Due to limited success, the store closed soon after. Carrefour has not made any other attempt at entering the Austrian market after that.
Bahrain
Carrefour opened hypermarkets in Bahrain on 2007, which were franchised by Majid Al-Futtaim, however all stores in Bahrain closed and were replaced by HyperMax in 2025.
Chile
Carrefour opened six supermarkets in Santiago de Chile between 1998 and 2003. However, Carrefour never surpassed a 3% market share in the country and its assets in Chile were sold to D&S in 2003.
China
Carrefour entered China in 1995. In 2007, Carrefour opened 22 stores in China – where the company broke its record for store openings in a one-year period. It was the leading foreign retailer in terms of sales figures, until 2008 and has since lost its No. 1 position in China to Walmart. In 2019, Carrefour sold 80% equity of Carrefour China to local retail comglomorate Suning.com at €620 million, marking the company's exit from China.
Colombia
In October 2012, Carrefour sold all 72 stores in Colombia to Chilean retailer Cencosud for $2.6 billion, with Cencosud converting all existing Carrefour hypermarkets to its Jumbo and Metro brands. Carrefour pulled out of Colombia to focus on its core markets.
Cyprus
In 2017, all of the Carrefour stores were sold to a Greek supermarket brand Sklavenitis and underwent a major rebranding, to reflect the brand that now owns the stores.
Czech Republic
In September 2005, Carrefour sold eleven stores in the Czech Republic to Tesco, the largest UK retailer. Tesco paid €57.4 million as well as its stores in Taiwan. Carrefour opened its first store in 1998 in the Czech Republic. The stores use the Tesco name and brand now.
Germany
The only store in Germany was opened in 1977 in Mainz-Bretzenheim as a joint venture with Delhaize le Lion and German retailer Stüssgen (later part of REWE Group). Due to problems with a new building permit process and the associated difficulties in opening new locations, the store was sold in 1979 to the German retailer Massa.
Hong Kong
On 18 September 2000, Carrefour closed its stores in Hong Kong after complaints from manufacturers about selling products (especially electronics) at prices far below those of its competitors. A company spokesman said at that time that the closures were due to "difficulties in finding sites suitable for developing its hypermarket concept and quickly acquiring a significant market share". Carrefour entered the Hong Kong market in December 1996 with a store in Heng Fa Chuen and later added stores in Tsuen Wan (Skyline Plaza), Tuen Mun, Yuen Long and Tsim Sha Tsui. Plans to open additional stores in Ma On Shan, Tseung Kwan O and Yau Tsim Mong had been cancelled.
India
Carrefour operated cash and carry stores in India under the name Carrefour Wholesale Cash & Carry. The first store opened on 30 December 2010 in Shahdara, Delhi. This was followed by a store in Jaipur in late 2011 and one in Meerut in October 2012, Agra in December 2013. Prior to September 2012, India's foreign direct investment (FDI) policy did not allow foreign companies to open multi-brand retail stores in the country. However, 100% FDI in cash-and-carry has been permitted since 1997. As a result, most global retailers, including Carrefour, opted for the cash-and-carry route in India. A new FDI policy, allowing up to 51% FDI in multi-brand retail, came into effect on 20 September 2012. On 8 July 2014, Carrefour announced that it would shut down its Indian operations and close its five wholesale stores by the end of September. In September 2024, Carrefour announced plans to re-enter the Indian market with the joint-venture of Apparel Group.
Indonesia
The first Carrefour branch in Indonesia opened on 14 October 1998 in Cempaka Putih region of Jakarta, following the end of 1997 Asian financial crisis and the subsequent fall of Suharto. In 2012, after operating independently, Carrefour Indonesia was bought by CT Corp and its shares are owned by Chairul Tanjung. CT Corp developed Transmart in 2014, a subsidiary of CT Corp operated by PT Trans Retail Indonesia (formerly PT Carrefour Indonesia, PT Contimas Utama Indonesia, PT Cartisa Properti Indonesia and PT Carti Satria Megaswalayan) and named after CT Corp's television networks Trans TV. It also developed Groserindo, a grocery store also largely operated by Carrefour. In 2020, CT Corp announced that it had completed the replacement of all Carrefour branches with Transmart.
Italy
Carrefour's first store was opened in 1972. In 2000, Carrefour rebranded its other hypermarkets called Euromercato and bought GS stores, which in 2010 rebranded to Carrefour. In 2013 or 2014, they bought some Billa stores (named Standa until 2010). In 2025, NewPrinces bought Carrefour Italia and from 2026-2028 all Carrefour stores in the country are rebranding to GS.
Japan
In 1999 Carrefour's Japanese subsidiary, Carrefour Japan Co. Ltd., opened. The first Carrefour in Japan opened in a suburb of Tokyo in December 2000. In January and February 2001 new Carrefour stores opened in Tokyo and Osaka. Sales were initially strong, but, as Miki Tanikawa of The New York Times wrote, "...10 months later, there is barely a line for most of the day at cash registers of most Carrefour stores here. Lengthy aisles of goods ranging from clothes to bicycles are mostly empty." In early 2003, Carrefour sold its 8 hypermarkets to AEON Group and on 10 March 2005, the subsidiary's name changed to AEON Marché Co., Ltd. The stores were still operated in the Carrefour name until 31 March 2010, when the license expired.
Jordan
Carrefour started its operations in Jordan in 2006 under Majid Al Futtaim, becoming a prominent retailer with multiple outlets across the country. Known for its diverse product range and affordability. However, Carrefour announced its closure in Jordan, citing challenges such as increasing competition, changing market dynamics, and a strategic decision to optimize operations in the region. Carrefour closed down all its operating units from 4 November 2024. It was rebranded as HyperMax.
Kazakhstan
In the summer of 2017, the one and only Carrefour hypermarket closed down in Almaty as a result of the loss of value of the Tenge currency.
Kuwait
Carrefour opened hypermarkets in Kuwait on 1995, which were franchised by Majid Al-Futtaim, however all stores in Kuwait closed and were replaced by HyperMax in 2025.
Malaysia
Carrefour entered Malaysia in 1994 and sold its 26 hypermarkets to AEON Group in November 2012. The hypermarkets was rebranded as AEON BIG, and operates with an orange logo, compared to the magenta logo used by its parent company and existing JUSCO stores in the country. The outlets in Kota Damansara and Jalan Ipoh were the first to be changed from Carrefour to AEON BIG;
Mexico
In March 2005, Carrefour sold its 29 hypermarkets in Mexico to Chedraui. Carrefour opened its first store in 1994 in Mexico.
North Macedonia
In October 2012, Carrefour opened its first store in Skopje. The store was part of the brand City Mall that opened the same day in Skopje. By the end of summer 2014, there were plans to open the second store in Tetovo. Carrefour shut down operations in North Macedonia because of debt.
Oman
Carrefour started its operations in Oman in 2001 under Majid Al Futtaim, becoming a prominent retailer with multiple outlets across the country. Known for its diverse product range and affordability, it served Omani shoppers for over two decades. However, in late 2024, Carrefour announced its closure in Oman, citing challenges such as increasing competition, changing market dynamics, and a strategic decision to optimize operations in the region. Despite its closure, Carrefour continues to thrive in neighboring countries under Majid Al Futtaim's management. Carrefour closed down all its operating units from 7 January 2025. It was rebranded as HyperMax.
Portugal
Carrefour entered Portugal by buying its first stores in 1991 – two Euromarché hypermarkets in Telheiras (a neighbourhood of Lisbon) and Vila Nova de Gaia. In July 2007 Carrefour sold all of its 12 hypermarkets and 9 fuel stations to Sonae for €662 million. Also included were 11 licenses for opening new commercial spaces. Currently, only 365 hard-discount supermarkets such as Minipreço are supported by Carrefour in Portugal, not included in the takeover.
Philippines
In the early 2000s, Carrefour planned to enter the Philippine market through a joint venture with the local Rustan's Group (now Robinsons Retail), but the project was ultimately shelved in December 2000 due to "economic and political factors" Thus, Carrefour never operated retail outlets in the country.
Russia
Carrefour entered the Russian market in the summer of 2009. In October 2009, only a month after it opened its second hypermarket in the country, Carrefour announced it was exiting Russia.
Singapore
In 2012, Carrefour's stores were primarily replaced by Cold Storage.
Slovakia
In 2018, Carrefour pulled out of the Slovak market, after 17 years of operation in the country.
South Korea
Carrefour entered the Korean market in 1996 with its first store in Bucheon and operated 32 stores across the country at its peak in its final year, 2006. Carrefour was confident it would dominate the market, and by 1999 invested a total of US$925 million into the Korean venture – more than any other foreign company in the Korean market at that time. Carrefour Korea enjoyed mediating success initially, gaining traction for unseen low prices and standing above its competitors, but the rise quickly ended when the Asian Financial Crisis struck South Korea in late 1997. Carrefour's reputation suffered a blow when it was exposed smuggling real estate in South Korea to international recipients. Alongside the reluctance of people spending in the midst of the financial crisis, boycotts ensued, beginning Carrefour's eventual demise. Complaints of Carrefour Korea's poor service quality grew, citing pushing products unfit for the Korean market and significantly soured relationships between the executives and the labour unions. With the company's attitude becoming reckless to its clients and suppliers, clients would boycott again while suppliers began refusing association with Carrefour Korea. With the company stained with controversial negativity, Carrefour Korea sold all its stores to E-Land and exited the Korean market in April 2006. Shortly after, E-Land sold their supermarket asset to Homeplus, recognized as Carrefour Korea's spiritual successor.
Switzerland
In August 2007 Carrefour sold its 12 hypermarkets in Switzerland to Swiss retailer Coop for $390 million;
Syria
Carrefour previously opened a store in Shahba Mall in Aleppo in 2009 and operated until the mall was destroyed during the Syrian Civil War on 16 October 2014 when the mall was destroyed and permanently closed.
Thailand
Carrefour's business in Thailand was sold to Big C Supercenter Public Company Limited, the owner of Big C hypermarket stores in Thailand ran by Groupe Casino at the time, due to complaints. The transaction was completed in March 2011 with the Suwinthawong branch being the first store converted from Carrefour to Big C. Carrefour entered the Thai market in 1995 under Central Group joint venture stakes and opened its first branch in the following year.
Taiwan
In 2020, Carrefour Taiwan announced it would acquire 199 Wellcome and 25 Jasons Market Place stores from Dairy Farm International. In 2022, Carrefour announced that it sold 60% equity of Carrefour Taiwan to Uni-President Enterprises Corporation. Uni-President thus ended the use of the Carrefour brand for its Taiwanese branches in July 2026, the hyper market was rebranded as Prosperity Plaza and market store was rebranded as Uni-Prosperity.
United Kingdom
Carrefour opened the first of several hypermarkets in the UK in September 1972 in Caerphilly, South Wales, in partnership with a UK company Wheatsheaf Distribution & Trading / Hypermarket Holdings followed by stores at the Telford Centre, Chandler's Ford, Minworth, Patchway and Swindon. The Dee Corporation later acquired the stores in the early 1980s; they continued to trade under the Carrefour name, while some other existing smaller sites were rebranded as Carrefour. In the 1980s, new stores were opened at the MetroCentre in Tyne and Wear, and the Merry Hill Shopping Centre in the West Midlands, before being rebranded under the now-defunct Gateway chain in 1988. In 1990, the stores were sold to Asda. The initial Caerphilly store was redeveloped in the 1990s; however, the original 1970s hypermarkets at Chandler's Ford, Minworth and Patchway (Cribbs Causeway) still exist as large Asda Supercentres. Since July 2011, online supermarket Ocado has sold a range of Carrefour products in the UK.
United States
Carrefour opened its first hypermarket in the United States in Philadelphia, Pennsylvania, in March 1988, across from the Franklin Mills shopping mall (now Philadelphia Mills). Despite the large selection, the store was generally derided for its poor conditions, and most of the time, many of the 61 checkout lanes in the store were deserted. In 1992, another location opened in Voorhees Township, New Jersey. Both stores closed because of financial debt in 1993. The Voorhees store was broken up into many smaller stores, while the Philadelphia location became a Walmart and a Dick's Sporting Goods.
Uzbekistan
Carrefour previously opened hypermarkets in Uzbekistan on 2021, which were franchised by Majid Al-Futtaim, however all stores in Uzbekistan closed in 2023.
Vietnam
Carrefour had two stores at Ho Chi Minh City until 2004. The stores were later converted into Lotte Mart branches.

== Criticism and controversies ==
On 1 May 2007, more than 30 employees of the now-closed Carrefour Ratu Plaza, Jakarta, Indonesia, were taken to the Pertamina Central Hospital after being poisoned by carbon monoxide. The hypermarket was located in the mall's basement, which offered insufficient ventilation.

On 26 June 2007, the company was convicted in a French court for false advertising. The suit alleged that Carrefour regularly stocked insufficient quantities of advertised products for sale. In addition, the company was convicted of selling products below cost and accepting kickbacks from wholesalers. Carrefour was ordered to pay a fine of €2 million and to prominently and legibly display a notice in all of its French stores disclosing the false advertising.

In Carrefour Mangga Dua Square in Jakarta, Indonesia, a 5-metre high metal rack fell on top of a 3-year-old boy, killing him almost instantly due to internal bleeding. Afterwards, the victim's family claimed that Carrefour has refused to meet with them to settle the case. However, a Carrefour Corporate Affairs Officer denied this allegation.

Carrefour has also received criticism for engaging in sweatshop practices.

On 7 May 2009, the French government asked a tribunal to fine Carrefour some €220,000 for more than 2,500 violations. Meat products lacked proper tracking information (more than 25% of inventory at some locations), and some products had incorrect labels – such as meat products that "shrank" in weight by 15% after receiving labels. The chain sold products that had long since passed their expiration dates, including, in one case, packs of baby formula that had expired six months earlier. Some 1,625 frozen and refrigerated products were found that had been stored in warehouses at ambient temperatures.

On 17 September 2018, images revealed that the municipal slaughterhouse in Boischaut, France, responsible for supplying meat to Carrefour, was killing animals in an extremely cruel way: cutting them up while they were still alive. The mistreatment scandal reverberated around the world and led to the closure of the slaughterhouse.

On 10 January 2019, the French branch made the news after selling zebra meat, Carrefour said it stopped selling the meat.

=== Boycott of supplies in China ===
A Carrefour outlet in Beijing, China, promotes the use of canvas bags as opposed to plastic bags prior to the 2008 Summer Olympics.

In April 2008, after the 2008 Olympic torch relay was disrupted by Tibetan independence movement advocates in London and especially in Paris, where some protesters attempted to wrest control of the torch from the torch bearers, Chinese activists promoted boycotting Carrefour because of unsubstantiated rumours that the company gave funds to Tibetan independence groups and the Dalai Lama. In its response, Carrefour China stated that it did support the Beijing Olympics; and that it would never do anything to harm the feelings of the Chinese people. Protests and calls for the boycott later subsided, partly because of efforts by French officials to apologize for the Paris torch attack.

=== Building collapse at Savar ===
On 24 April 2013, the eight-story Rana Plaza commercial building collapsed in Savar, a sub-district near Dhaka, the capital of Bangladesh. At least 1,127 people died and over 2,438 were injured. The factory housed a number of separate garment factories employing around 5,000 people, several shops, and a bank and manufactured apparel for brands including the Benetton Group, Joe Fresh, The Children's Place, Primark, Monsoon, and Dressbarn. Of the 29 brands identified as having sourced products from the Rana Plaza factories, only 9 attended meetings held in November 2013 to agree a proposal on compensation to the victims. Several companies refused to sign, including Walmart, Carrefour, Bonmarché, Mango, Auchan and KiK. The agreement was signed by Primark, Loblaw, Bonmarché and El Corte Ingles.

=== Slavery in Thailand ===
In 2014, The Guardian reported that Carrefour is a client of Charoen Pokphand Foods. During a six-month investigation, The Guardian traced the entire supply chain from slave ships in Asian waters to leading producers and retailers.

=== Incidents of violence in Brazil ===
Carrefour Brazil has suffered at least four lawsuits against violence, racism and homophobia. Some notable incidents include the killing of Manchinha, an abandoned female mixed-breed dog that was beaten to death by a Carrefour employee, as well as the Killing of João Alberto Silveira Freitas.

=== Deforestation in Amazonia ===
According to Mighty Earth, Carrefour is not respecting its commitments to fight deforestation in the Amazon rainforest. In a report at the occasion of the 2022 World Amazon Day, Mighty Earth published a statement criticising the retail group for sourcing from "meat and soy traders with devastating practices." The organisation points to the group's activities in Brazil where, with its 1,000 sales outlets, Carrefour controls 25% of the food distribution market. The NGO found that two-thirds of the 102 meat products inspected in Carrefour stores in Brazil are supplied by JBS, which is "regularly targeted for deforestation cases", according to Mighty Earth. Following the report publication, Carrefour suspended beef supplies from two JBS slaughterhouses in the Amazon.

=== Stabbing in Italy ===
On 27 October 2022, a man grabbed a knife from a supermarket shelf in Milan, stabbing five people, killing one and wounding four others, including Spanish soccer player Pablo Mari, Italian authorities said.

Police arrested a 46-year-old Italian man suspected in the attack at a shopping centre in Assago (a town near Milan).

== Mobile ==
Carrefour Mobile logo

Carrefour Mobile is a Mobile Virtual Network Operator (MVNO) owned by Carrefour.

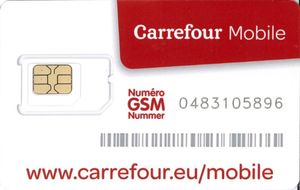
Carrefour Mobile SIM

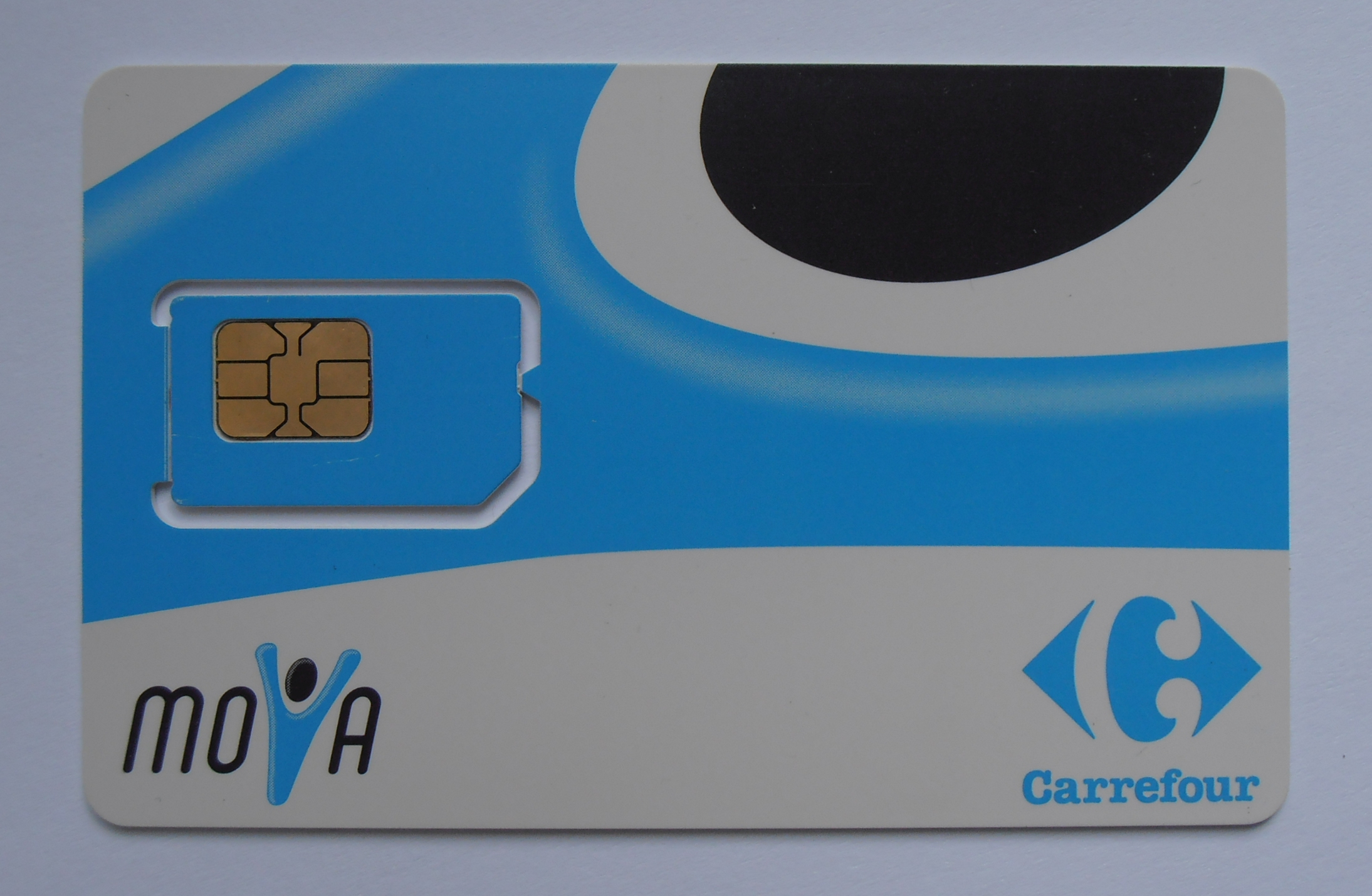
Carrefour Mova Mobile SIM

Carrefour offers its mobile telephony services in:

- Belgium (as Carrefour Mobile);
- France (as Carrefour Mobile);
- Spain (as Carrefour Móvil);
- Italy (as 1Mobile, also known as UNO Mobile or Carrefour UNO Mobile);
- Greece (as Carrefour Mobile);
- Poland (as Carrefour Mova Mobile);
- Brazil (as Carrefour Mobile).

Carrefour first launched its mobile service in Belgium, in partnership with Effortel and using Effortel Technologies as Mobile Virtual Network Enabler (MVNE), on the existing BASE network infrastructure.

In France, this offer was launched by exploiting the infrastructure of the Orange network and using the company Experian as MVNE. This operator first offered prepaid offers, and since September 2007 has offered packages. Carrefour Mobile's offer is in competition with that offered by A-Mobile, of the Auchan group.

Since then, Carrefour has launched a service in several other countries, in particular, Carrefour was the first MVNO in Italy, launching the service in June 2007, in partnership with Effortel.

On 24 September 2012 the MVNO offer stopped in France but the brand maintained a specific offer provided by Orange.

== Carrefour Foundation ==
The Carrefour Foundation (Fondation d'Enterprise Carrefour) is a philanthropic fund created by Carrefour in 2000 to support social welfare programmes 'linked to [its] core business as a retailer' in countries the company operates and in countries where its suppliers are located.

== See also ==
- Carrefour Marinopoulos
- European Retail Round Table
- Groupe Casino
- List of companies of France
- List of hypermarkets
- Sherpa (brand)
