= List of shopping malls in Kenya =

This is a list of shopping malls in Kenya.

== Nairobi Region ==
- Boardwalk Mall - Westlands
- Capital Centre - Mombasa Road
- The Ciata City Mall, Ridgeways
- The Crossroads Mall - Karen
- Diamond Plaza I & II - 4th Parklands Avenue
- Galleria Mall - Karen-Langata Road
- Garden City Mall - Kasarani
- The Gift Mall
- The GreenHouse Mall - Ngong Road
- Greenspan Mall Donholm
- Highway Mall - Mombasa Road
- The Hub Karen Mall - Nairobi
- The Imaara Shopping Mall
- The Junction Mall
- K-Mall - Komarock (off Kangundo Road)
- Karen Shopping Centre - Karen
- The Lavington Mall - Lavington
- The Mall - Westlands
- Mountain Mall - Kasarani
- Mountain View Mall - Waiyaki Way
- Nakumatt Lifestyle
- Nextgen Mall - Mombasa Road
- Nyang Digital Inc
- The Point - Buruburu
- Prestige Plaza - Ngong road
- Ridgeways Mall - Kiambu Road
- Sarit Centre - Westlands
- Shujaa Mall - Spine Road
- The Southfield Mall - Embakasi
- T-Mall - Nairobi West
- Thika Road Mall (TRM) - Kasarani
- Two Rivers Mall at The Two Rivers Social City - Limuru Road / Northern Bypass
- Unicity Mall - Kahawa
- The Village Market - Gigiri
- The Waterfront Karen
- Westgate Shopping Mall
- Yaya Centre - Hurlingham

== Central Region ==
=== Kiambu County ===
- Ananas Mall - Thika Town
- Ciata City Mall - Kiambu Road
- Cleanshelf Supermarket - Kiambu (East) Town
- Flame Tree Park - Makongeni Thika
- Juja City Mall - Juja Town
- Kamindi Self Ridges - Kiambu (East) Town
- Kiambu Mall- Kiambu Town
- The Nord Mall - Ruiru
- Smart Home Supermarket - Kiambu (East) Town
- Spur Mall - Ruiru
- Tuskys Mall - Section 9 Thika
- Twiga Mart Supermarket - Kiambu (East) Town
- Ushirika Mall - Limuru

== Eastern Region ==
=== Machakos County ===
- The Crystal Rivers Mall - Mlolongo
- The Digital Mall - Mlolongo
- Gateway Mall - Syokimau
- Greatwall Gardens Mall - Athi River
- Kiambaa Mall (Naivas Supermarket) - Machakos town
- The Masaa (Mulleys Supermarket)
- Signature Mall - Sabaki
- Trafford Park - Syokimau

=== Kajiado County ===
- Eastmatt Supermarket - Kajiado town
- Kitengela Mall - Kitengela
- Maasai Mall - Ongata Rongai
- Maiyan Mall - Ongata Rongai
- Masai Stores Kajiado - town
- Milele Mall - Ngong
- OBC Mall - Kitengela
- Red Heron Mall - Kitengela

== Meru and surrounding counties ==
- Greenwood City - Under construction in Meru town centre. Largest mall and integrated development in all of greater Central and Eastern Kenya.

== Coastal Kenya ==
- Cinemax Plaza
- City Mall - Nyali
- Mtwapa Mall - Mtwapa
- Nakumatt Diani
- Nyali Centre - Nyali
- Oasis Mall - Malindi
- Planet Bamburi

== Nyanza ==
=== Kisumu County ===
- City Mall - CBD
- Dubai Shopping Mall - Nyamasaria
- Format Mall - CBD
- LBDA Shopping Complex - Mamboleo (under construction)
- Mega City - Nyamasaria
- Mega Plaza
- Mini Mall - CBD
- The Swan Centre - CBD
- United Mall - CBD
- West End - CBD

== Rift Valley Region ==
=== Naivasha Town ===
- Buffalo Mall
- Jubilee Mall
- Safari Center

=== Nakuru County ===
- Golden Life Mall
- Great Rift Mall (under construction)
- Imani Shopping Mall
- Jennifer Riria hub
- Naivas Super Centre Mall
- Rivanas Arena
- Tapoos Complex
- Tuskys Mall
- Westside Mall

=== Eldoret Town ===
- Barng'etuny Plaza
- The Eldo Center
- Highlands Mall
- Komora Centre
- Paradise mall
- Rupa's Mall
- Taj Mall
- Unimall
- Zion Mall

=== Kitale Town ===
- Mega Centre
- Khetia's Shopping Mall

=== Nanyuki Town ===
- Cedar Mall
- Nanyuki Mall

=== Kericho Town ===
- Green Square Mall
- Simba mall

== North Eastern Kenya ==
=== Garissa County ===
- Garissa Mall
