= Indian Institute of Management Bodh Gaya =

Autonomous public business school in Bodh Gaya, Bihar in India

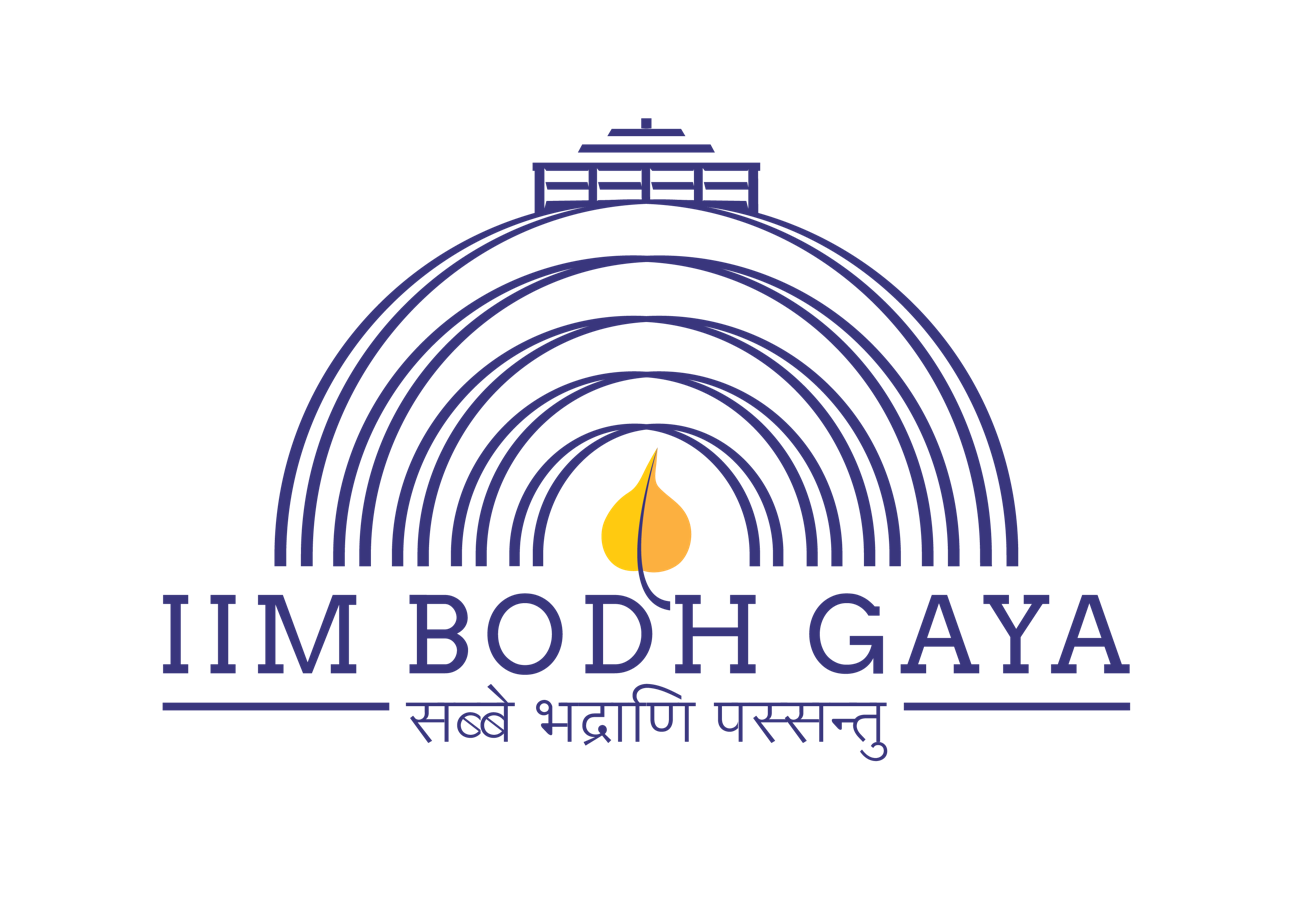
- Former name: IIM Bihar
- Motto: सब्बे भद्राणि पस्सन्तु
- Motto in English: Let all be witnesses of all good happenings
- Type: Public Business School
- Established: 2015; 11 years ago
- Accreditation: AACSB
- Academic affiliations: AIU; Institute of National Importance
- Endowment: ₹429.55 crore
- Budget: ₹108.29 crore
- Chairperson: L. Ramkumar
- Visitor: President of India
- Director: Dr. Vinita S. Sahay
- Faculty: 68 (as of 2026)
- Administrative staff: 50+
- Students: 1700+
- Undergraduates: 600-800+
- Postgraduates: 1100+
- Doctoral students: 50-80+
- Location: Bodhgaya, Gaya, Bihar, India
- Campus: 119 acres (0.5 km^{2}); Urban area, Metropolis
- Newspaper: Pathway
- Website: www.iimbg.ac.in
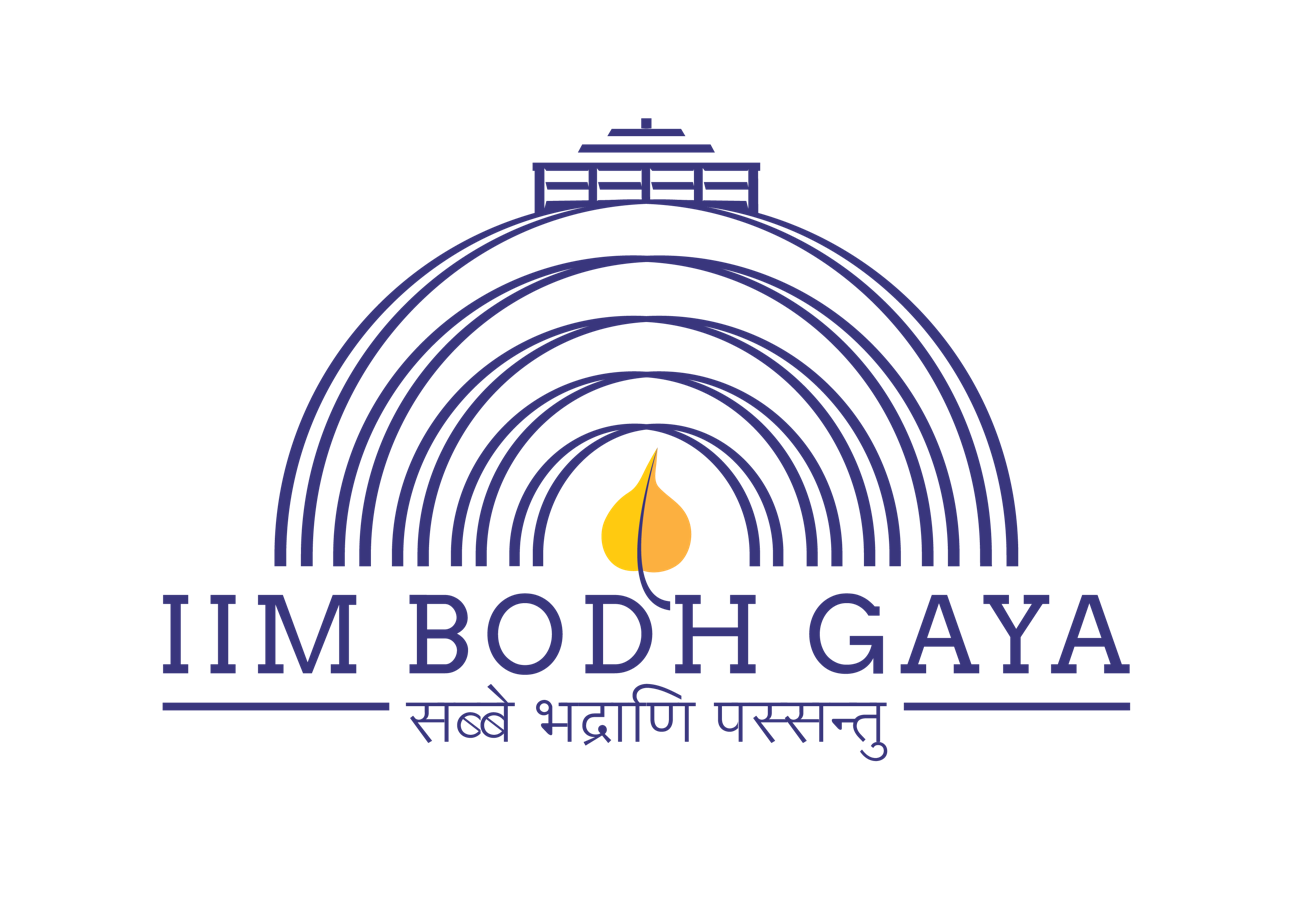

The Indian Institute of Management Bodh Gaya (IIM Bodh Gaya or IIM-BG) is an autonomous public business school which situated in Bodhgaya, Gaya, in Bihar. It is the 16th Indian Institute of Management (IIM) since 1961. Established by the Government of India in 31 August 2015. The institution was formerly mentored by Indian Institute of Management Calcutta and Indian Institute of Management Indore. It was accorded the status of an Institute of National Importance by the Ministry of Human Resources, Government of India under the Indian Institute of Management Act, 2017.

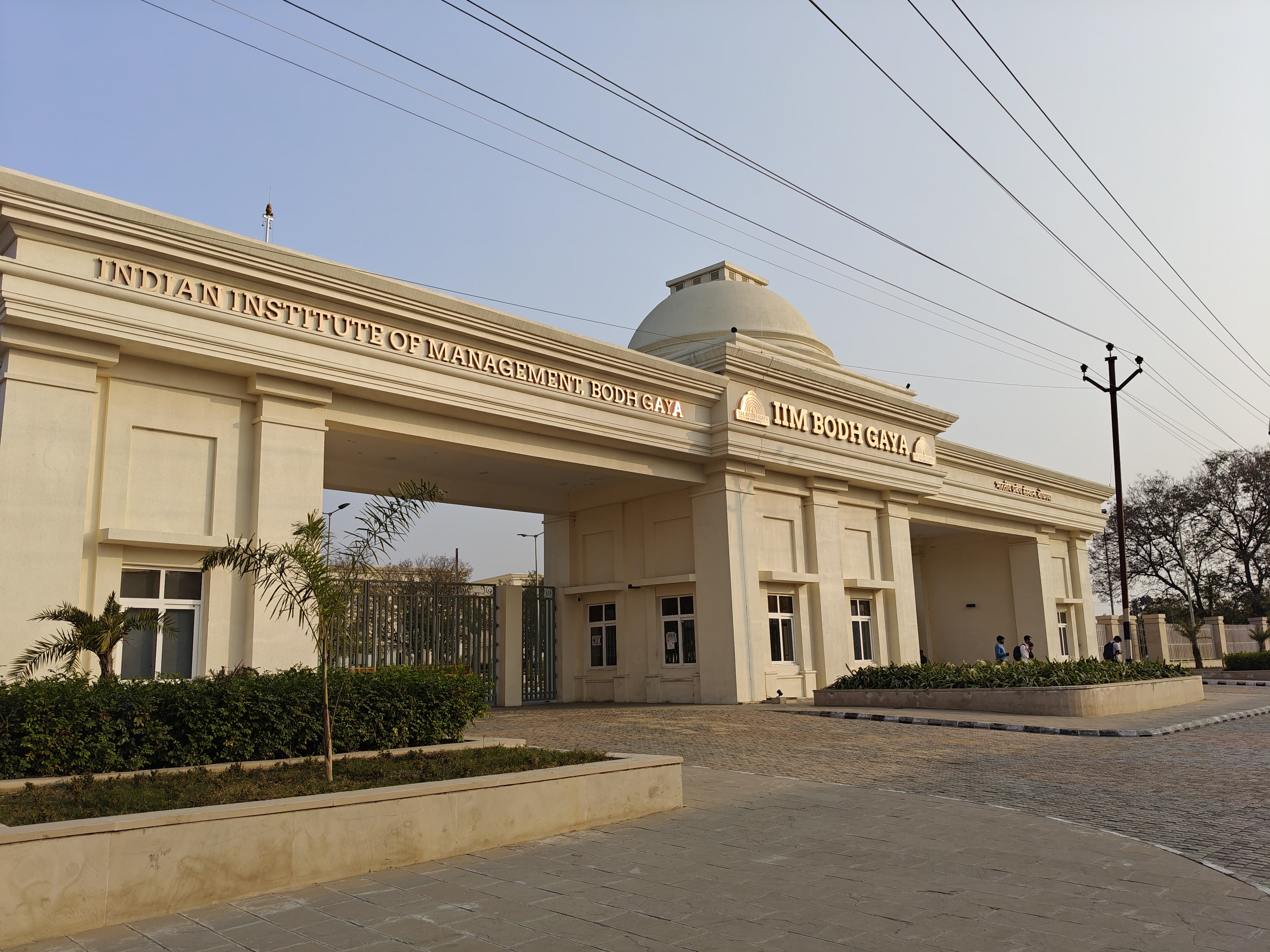
IIM Bodh Gaya

It is located in the historic region of Magadha (near the Mahabodhi Temple, a UNESCO World Heritage Site), the institute draws inspiration from ancient centres of learning, particularly ancient Nalanda University, while reflecting Bodh Gaya's religious importance and global significance.

It became the first among the third-generation IIMs to receive AACSB accreditation in 2026.Also, planned to achieve AMBA and EQUIS accredition around 2030.

== History ==
Originally set to be named as IIM Bihar, IIM-BG was one of five Indian Institutes of Management (IIMs) set up by the 2014 Union budget of India. The academic session for the first batch was inaugurated by the then Human Resources Development minister, Smriti Irani on 31 August 2015.

In 2018, Dr. Vinita S. Sahay, professor of marketing at the Indian Institute of Management Raipur, was appointed by the Government of India as the first director of IIM-BG. Dr. Vinita S. Sahay is only the second woman in the country to lead an IIM. Top leaders and industrialists like Uday Kotak (Chairperson & MD & CEO, Kotak Bank Ltd.), Janmajeya Sinha (Chairman, Boston Consulting Group India), Falguni S. Nayar (Founder & CEO, Nykaa.com) and many other eminent personalities were inducted to the Board of Governors of IIM-BG.

== Campus ==
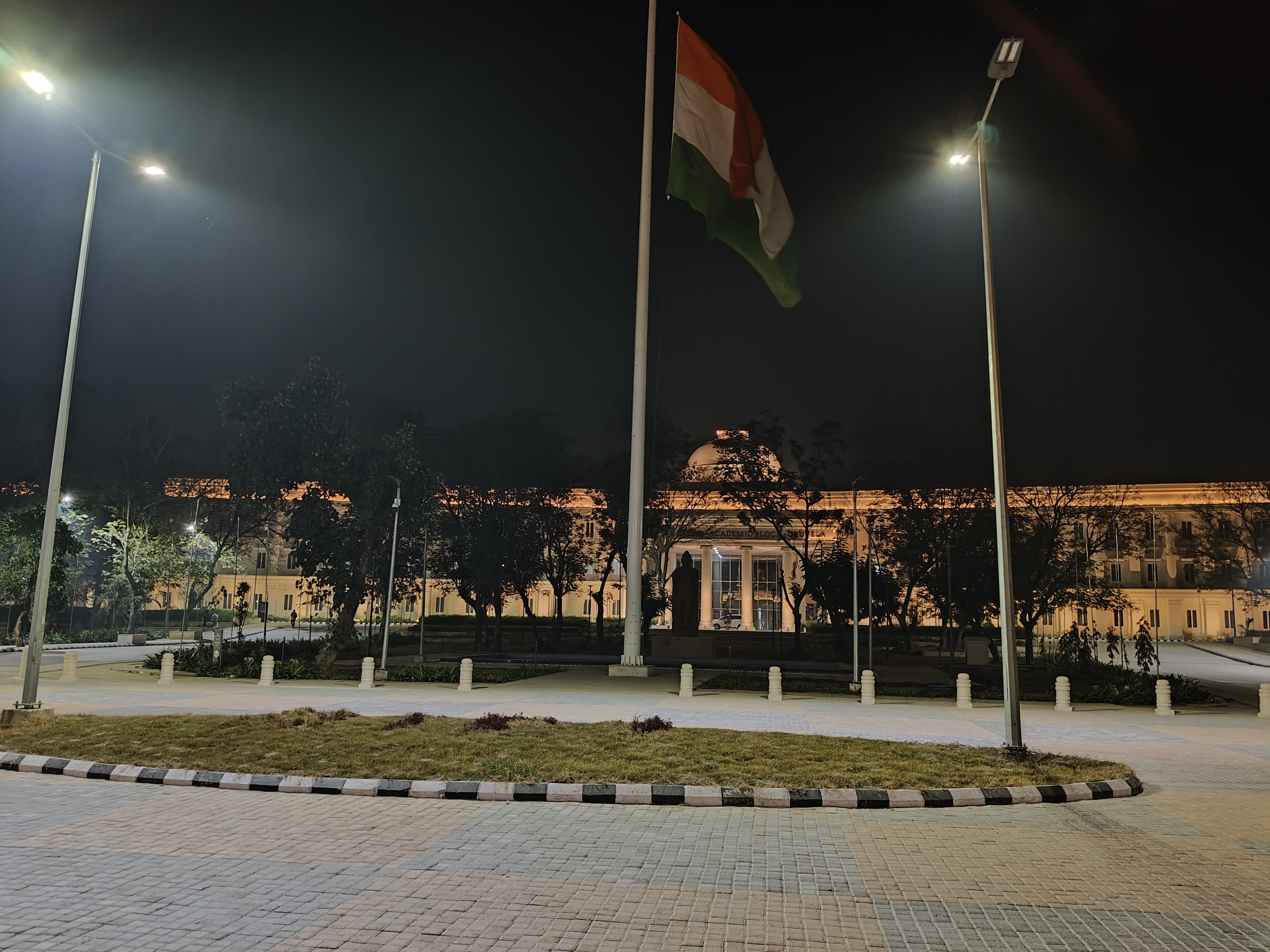
Main Building

IIM Bodh Gaya is located in the temple city of Bodh Gaya. The institute has its own hostels, with amenities for different sports like cricket, volleyball, football, table tennis, basketball, badminton, etc., and a gymnasium. The permanent campus of IIM Bodh Gaya was designed by CP Kukreja Architects.

Prime Minister Narendra Modi inaugurated various education and skill development projects at a cost of over Rs 13,300 crore at a function held in Jammu. In this series, he inaugurated IIM-BG online.

=== Startup Hub Incubation Center-INSPIRE ===
The IIMBG INSPIRE (IIM Bodh Gaya-Incubation Centre To Support Innovation Research And Entrepreneurship) was established in the IIM BG campus with the purpose of supporting entrepreneurial endeavors at IIM Bodh Gaya. It encourages students studying at IIM Bodh Gaya to make use of the incubation center. INSPIRE has played a pivotal role in incubating three campus startups initiated by IPM students of IIM Bodh Gaya, including Discorso, a podcast developed by students of Envision, Can3 on wheels, a fast food kiosk, and Drinks Exchange, a specialized kiosk offering a range of juices and shakes.

== Academics ==
=== Academic programmes ===
==== Master of Business Administration (MBA) ====
The Post Graduate Programme in Management (PGPM) is a two-year, regular, full-time residential program. Admission to the PGP course of IIM Bodh Gaya is conducted each year through the Common Admission Test (CAT). The PGP course consists of six trimesters spread over the two years. The first year constitutes the fundamental courses which lay the premises for various management roles. Between the first and second years, students are expected to go through an eight-week summer internship. The second-year constitutes the elective courses that provide diverse opportunities for students to study and specialize in their specific fields of interest.

IIM Bodh Gaya follows the same pedagogy of its previous mentor, the Indian Institute of Management Calcutta.

==== Integrated Programme in Management (IPM) ====
The Integrated Programme in Management (IPM) is a five-year, full-time residential program that combines undergraduate and postgraduate management studies. Admission to the IPM course of IIM Bodh Gaya is based on the Joint Integrated Programme in Management Admission Test (JIPMAT) conducted by the National Testing Agency (NTA) and academic profile. The IPM course consists of six semesters (3 years) and six trimesters (2 years), dividing the program into two halves.

After the completion of the second year, students will have to undergo a compulsory Rural and Social Immersion internship. In the sixth semester, students are required to choose a sector-specific specialization. Upon successful completion of the program, students are awarded the Bachelors of Business Management (BBM) and Master of Business Administration (MBA) Degree by IIM Bodh Gaya. Additionally, candidates who opt to exit the program after completing the requirements of the first three years will be awarded the Bachelor of Business Administration (BBA) degree.

==== MBA (Digital Business Management) ====
The MBA in Digital Management is a two-year, full-time residential program offered by IIMBG. Admission to the program is conducted annually through the Common Admission Test (CAT). The curriculum is structured into six trimesters spread over the two years, with the first year focusing on fundamental courses. Students get the opportunity to participate in an optional learning module at a foreign institute. Additionally, the program includes a 4-month intensive industry internship.

==== MBA (Hospital & Healthcare Management) ====
The MBA in Hospital & Healthcare Management is a two-year, full-time residential program offered by IIM Bodh Gaya. Admission to the program is conducted annually through the Common Admission Test (CAT). The curriculum is structured into six terms over the two years, with the first year dedicated to core courses. In the second year, students can choose elective courses from two specialization tracks: "Hospital Management" and "Healthcare Management." At the end of the first year, students have the opportunity to engage in an industry immersion program lasting 4 months. Additionally, in the 5th term, students participate in a community project that involves conducting a field study to understand various public health issues and effectiveness of public health schemes run by the government.

==== Ph.D. Program In Management ====
The Doctoral Programme in Management at IIM Bodh Gaya is a 5-year full-time residential program offered by IIM Bodh Gaya. The program aims to train researchers, thinkers, and academic professionals in the field of management.

=== Student Exchange Program ===
IIM Bodh Gaya has collaborations with different institutions around the globe. This was intended to provide students with a view of strategic development in the global era by responding to changes in the social, economic, legal, technological, cultural, and political environments. IIM Bodh Gaya has collaborated with ESC Clermont Graduate School of Management (France), Montpellier Business School (France), Alba Graduate Business School (Greece), SolBridge International School of Business (South Korea), Instituto de Estudios Superiores de Administración (Venezuela), the University of Florence (Italy), Universidad De Monterrey (UDEM, Mexico), and others.

== Rankings ==
Institute rankings

Business/Management – India
- NIRF (2022): 73
- NIRF (2023): 53
- NIRF (2024): 33

IIM Bodh Gaya was ranked 31st among business/management schools in India by National Institutional Ranking Framework (NIRF) in 2025
