= Nilesh Ved =

Indian businessperson

- Education: Boston University (B.Sc.)
- Occupations: businessperson, investor
- Spouse: Sima Ved
- Children: 3
- Website: nileshved.ae

Nilesh Ved is a businessperson and the founder and chairman of AppCorp Holding Global, an international conglomerate operating across 14 countries and the parent of Apparel Group.

== Early life and education ==
Ved graduated with a Bachelor of Science in Business Administration from Boston University. He is coming from a family with a history of entrepreneurship, including operating one of Dubai's largest gold bullion trading businesses since 1904. Ved relocated to Dubai after completing his studies in the early 1990s, where he launched his first retail venture Lamcy Plaza in Dubai which would eventually evolve into the Apparel Group.

== Career ==
In 1996, Ved founded Apparel Group, beginning with three retail stores selling the American fashion brand Nine West. In 2001, Ved established Major Brands for the India operations of Apparel Group. The company holds the rights to several international fashion and lifestyle brands, including Mango, Nine West, Aldo, Bally, Charles & Keith, La Senza, Inglot, Promod, Aldo Accessories, and Okaidi.

Ved launched Club Apparel, the group's loyalty program that offers rewards for shoppers, and 6thStreet.com, an omni-channel fashion e-commerce website that operates in the UAE, KSA, Kuwait, Oman, Bahrain and Qatar. In June 2019, Ved announced an agreement with Aldar Properties to establish 23 retail outlets across three of Aldar's major shopping malls. In September 2022, 6thStreet collaborated with Nanovo to open the region’s first phygital store at Dubai Hills Mall, merging online and offline shopping. In January 2023, Ved was among the investors in FuelBuddy, a New Delhi–based startup that raised $20 million.

In September 2024, Ved's Apparel Group announced a major joint venture with the French multinational retailer Carrefour to launch and expand its hypermarket chain in India.

In December 2025, Ved, through Apparel Group India, led a reported $25 million Series B funding round for the Indian direct-to-consumer pet care company Heads Up For Tails (HUFT).

In May 2026, Ved was appointed chairman of the UAE chapter of the UAE–India Business Council (UIBC-UC), a business council focused on economic relations between the United Arab Emirates and India, succeeding founding chairman Faizal Kottikollon. The appointment was announced during a leadership transition event in Dubai.

As of 2026, the group operates more than 2500 stores in 14 countries and has over 85 brands. Apparel Group has rights to international brands, including Tommy Hilfiger, Charles & Keith, Aldo, Tim Hortons, Cold Stone Creamery, and Victoria's Secret.

== Recognitions ==
Ved has received several awards, including Arabian Business's 50 Richest Indians in the GCC (2011, 2015, 2016), and Arabian Business's 100 Most Powerful Indians in the Gulf. In 2018, he was also named among the Influential Indians: GCC Business Legends by Gulf Business. In 2025, he was awarded the Lifetime Achievement Award at the Retail Leadership Circle (RLC) Honours for his contributions to the retail industry.

== Personal life ==
Nilesh Ved is married to Sima Ved, the Chairwoman and Founder of the Apparel Group. They have three children Selina Ved, Sarisha Ved, and Nayan Ved.
