= Maleesha Kharwa =

Indian fashion model (born 2008)

- Born: 13 January 2008 (age 18)
- Occupations: Model; internet personality

Maleesha Kharwa (born 13 January 2008) is an Indian model and internet personality. She is recognised for her journey from Mumbai's slums to the fashion industry. Known for her striking looks and inspiring journey, she has since worked with various brands and advocates for underprivileged communities, using her platform to raise awareness about social issues.

== Early life ==
Kharwa was raised in Mumbai's Dharavi area, one of the city's largest slums. Her father Mukesh Kharwa works as a clown at children's events. She also has a younger brother. Despite challenging living conditions, Kharwa aspired to become a model from a young age.

== Career ==
In 2020, during a visit to Mumbai, American actor and dancer Robert Hoffman encountered Kharwa. Impressed by her potential, Hoffman assisted in creating her Instagram account and initiated a GoFundMe campaign to support her modeling ambitions. This exposure led to modeling opportunities, including features in magazines such as Cosmopolitan India, Grazia, Elle, and Vogue.

In 2023, Kharwa became the face of Forest Essentials’ “Yuvati” collection, a luxury beauty and skincare brand.

As of March 2025, Kharwa has amassed over 480,000 followers on Instagram, where she shares insights into her personal and professional life.
