= Bernardo Trujillo =

Colombian-American marketing executive (1920–1971)

- Born: 1920; Bogotá, Colombia
- Died: 1971 (aged 50–51)
- Occupation: Marketing executive
- Employer: NCR Corporation

Bernardo Trujillo (1920–1971) was a Colombian-born American marketing executive. He hosted merchandizing seminars as part of cash register company NCR Corporation's marketing strategy, ultimately influencing the development of modern supermarkets, especially in France, where he became known as the "Pope of Supermarketing."

== Early life ==
Born in 1920 in Colombia, he studied law in Bogotá. He emigrated to the United States and eventually became a naturalized US citizen.

== Career ==
Trujillo began his career as a Spanish teacher. In 1944, he was hired as a translator by the NCR Corporation in Dayton, Ohio.

From 1957 to 1965, as part of NCR's marketing strategy, Trujillo taught executive education merchandizing seminars to about 11,000 students, the MMM seminars on Modern Merchandizing Methods. In his seminars, he emphasized the need to build supermarkets with large parking lots and cheap products and defined many key principles of the industry, such as "No Parking, No Business". His classes played a particularly significant role in France. There, his students included Denis Defforey and Marcel Fournier, who later founded Carrefour, and Gérard Mulliez, who founded Auchan. Other students included André Essel, the co-founder of Fnac; Bernard Darty, the founder of Darty; and Paul Dubrule, the founder of AccorHotels.

Trujillo became known as the "Pope of Supermarketing."

Trujillo died in 1971.
