= Euromarché =

- Type: Société anonyme à conseil d'administration
- Founded: 1968; 1991 (bought by Carrefour)
- Founder: Raymond Berthault
- Defunct: 1994 (France)
- Headquarters: Athis-Mons, France
- Key people: Antoine Bernheim
- Services: Retail
- Owner: until June 1991 : Viniprix (53%); Printemps (25%)
- Parent: Carrefour
- Website: euromarche.com

Euromarché (English: Euromarket) was a French hypermarket chain. The first store opened in 1968 in Saint-Michel-sur-Orge. In June 1991, the group was acquired by its rival, Carrefour, for 5.2 billion francs.

In June 1991, there were 77 Euromarché hypermarkets, 47 DIY stores Bricorama, and 57 cafétérias Eris. Sandra Mackey, author of The Saudis: Inside the Desert Kingdom, said in 1987 that it was "the French equivalent of K-Mart."

== History ==
In April 1981, Euromarché opened its first store in Saudi Arabia in Riyadh, and is the last Euromarché that exists today.

A store opened in Telheiras in 1990.

Until 2009, there was also a Euromarché store in Fort-de-France in Martinique when it changed to a Carrefour hypermarket.
