= Sima Ganwani Ved =

Indian businesswoman in Dubai

- Born: Africa
- Citizenship: India
- Education: MBA Business Management
- Alma mater: BSC in Business Management King's College London
- Occupations: Founder & Chairwoman of Apparel Group
- Spouse: Nilesh Ved
- Children: 3
- Website: simaved.com/en

Sima Ganwani Ved is an Indian businesswoman and philanthropist. She is the founder and chairwoman of Apparel Group, a multinational retail and fashion conglomerate headquartered in Dubai, United Arab Emirates.

She was named the 12th most powerful businesswomen in the Middle East by Forbes in 2024.

== Early life and education ==
Sima was born in Africa and brought to Dubai by her father in the 1970s. She was raised in an entrepreneurial family and developed an interest in the retail sector at an early age. At the age of 20, she began managing a department store in her father’s shopping mall. She received her BA degree from King's College London, followed by an MBA in Business Management.

== Business career ==
In 1996, she founded the Apparel Group, a UAE-based fashion and retail company. She is also the Vice Chair of the AppCorp, the holding company that has Apparel group, 6thStreet.com, Indus real estate, and Harley Medical Centre.

Ved is a member of organizations like YPO and CEO. She is the first female member of YPO to set up a regional chapter (YPO MENA STAR), which had 52% female members. In 2010, she launched her TV chat show, Hi tea with Sima Ved, on the Star Plus international.

She mentored her teenage daughter to launch an athleisure brand F5 Global in 2021, with some proceeds going towards educating underprivileged kids. She mentored and founded a social commerce beauty platform NESSA with her eldest daughter, Selina Ved. In November 2024, Sima Ved participated as one of the "sharks" on Shark Tank Dubai Season 2.

== Awards ==
- Philanthropreneur of the year.
- Retailer of the year.
- Great Women's award.
- Emirates Woman of the Year.
- Ranked #12 of the 100 most powerful businesswomen of 2024 by Forbes Middle East.
- Ranked #12 of the 100 most powerful businesswomen of 2025 by Forbes Middle East.
- Ranked #12 of the Arabian Business 100 Most Inspiring Women 2025.
- Ved was featured on the Forbes "50 Over 50 Global 2026" list, which celebrates women over 50 who are leaders, creators, and innovators.
