= The Hub Karen =

The Hub Karen Mall
- Have it all in one mall
- Location: Karen, Nairobi, Kenya
- Opened: 14 February 2016
- Manager: The Hub Karen Management, Ltd.
- Num. of stores: 85+
- Num. of anchor tenants: 1
- Floor area: 35,000 square feet (3,300 m^{2})
- Floors: 3
- Parking: over 1,200 spaces
- Website: https://www.thehubkaren.com

The Hub Karen is a shopping centre in Nairobi, Kenya that was opened on 4 February 2016. It is located in the affluent Karen suburb of Nairobi. It hosts both international and local retailers. The mall now hosts over 85 stores and receives roughly 55,000 visitors per week.

== Overview ==
=== Layout ===
The development of the Hub Karen mall has been split into two phases, the first phase being a 35,000-square-metre gross area (excluding parking) that features retail spaces, offices, a gym, a kids' play area, a game area, medical access, and outdoor aerial activities.

At the heart of the mall is a 2,000-square-metre piazza and a clock tower. The area is used for a range of activities, including travel exhibitions. The mall is host to the first Carrefour Hypermarket opened in East Africa, as well as the first F&F branch in Africa. Burger King also opened its first restaurant in Kenya at The Hub in November 2016.

=== Local impact ===
The Hub Karen supports the local community through funding projects. It is involved with the Karengata Youth Soccer Association, the newly built community library, and the local police force.

In May 2017, The Hub Karen Mall announced it would install a 450KW solar power plant to generate power for the mall's daily needs.

== See also ==
- List of shopping malls in Kenya
