= Denis Defforey =

French entrepreneur and businessperson (1925–2006)

- Born: July 7, 1925; Lagnieu, Ain, France
- Died: February 6, 2006 (aged 80)
- Occupation: Businessman
- Known for: co-founder of Carrefour

Denis Defforey (July 7, 1925 - February 6, 2006) was a French businessman. He was the co-founder of Carrefour, and its chief executive officer from 1985 to 1990.

== Biography ==
At the dawn of the 1960s, the Defforey family managed a food wholesale business in the French Ain region. They met the dry goods store owner Marcel Fournier and they pooled their expertise to launch a discount store in Annecy. Defforey was first in charge of the food sections. With his brother Jacques Defforey and Marcel Fournier, Denis Defforey traveled to the United States in the early 1960s to study and export the new models of superstores. They were trained by Bernardo Trujillo. With the explicit goal to go after the new E.Leclerc stores, they opened the first Carrefour superstore in 1963 in Sainte-Geneviève-des-Bois.

Denis Defforey was president of the group Carrefour from 1985 to 1990. He remained on the supervisory board of Carrefour until 1995. After the merger of Carrefour and Promodès in 1999, the Defforey family's 18% shares in Carrefour were diluted. Defforey distanced himself from the new direction. His son Hervé Defforey was the group's number 2 until 2001. The Defforey family remained minor shareholders of the group Carrefour until 2004.
