= Garden City Mall =

Shopping centre in Nairobi, Kenya

General information
- Location: Kasarani, Nairobi, Kenya
- Coordinates: 1°13′55″S 36°52′40″E
- Opened: 28 May 2015; 11 years ago
- Owner: Actis Capital

Technical details
- Floor count: 3
- Floor area: 33,500 m^{2} (361,000 sq ft)

Design and construction
- Architect: Tirad Architects

Other information
- Number of stores: <100
- Parking: 2200

Website
- shopgardencitymall.com

Garden City Mall is a shopping centre located in Kasarani in Nairobi, Kenya. With 33,500 m² of gross retail space, it is the second largest shopping centre in Kenya.

== Overview ==
The mall is located approximately 15 kilometres (9 mi) from Nairobi's city centre, along Thika Road in Kasarani. It was opened to the public on 28 May 2015, making it the largest mall in East and Central Africa until 2017 when Two Rivers Mall was inaugurated. The mall is part of a mixed-use establishment that also provides housing within the same confines. Garden City Mall like any other shopping centre, provides an array of services from a retail supermarket chain; fast food restaurants; fashion and accessories shops; electronics and technology shops; banking and services; a movie theatre; outdoor recreation centre.
