= Apparel Group =

UAE-based fashion and retail conglomerate

- Type: Private Company
- Industry: Fashion & Retail
- Founded: 1996; 30 years ago by Sima Ved
- Headquarters: Dubai, UAE
- Products: Fabrics, garments, designer wear, denim, cosmetics, fashion accessories, footwear, ice cream, coffeehouse, and restaurant chain
- Number of employees: 28,000
- Website: apparelgroup.com

Apparel Group LLC is a UAE-based fashion and retail conglomerate company headquartered in Dubai, UAE. Apparel Group operates more than 2500 retail stores , and is functional in 14 countries, mostly in the GCC region, such as UAE, Oman, Bahrain, Kuwait, Saudi Arabia, Malaysia, Thailand, Singapore, India, Pakistan, Egypt, South Africa, and Indonesia.

== History ==
Apparel Group was founded by Sima Ved in 1996. Their first venture was the franchisee of Nine West in Dubai.

In April 2022, the company opened 20 stores in the Place Vendôme Mall in Lusail City, Qatar. In October, Apparel Group entered into a partnership with Indian cosmetics retailer Nykaa to build Nysaa, a multi-brand beauty retail business in the GCC where Nykaa will hold a 55% stake of the entity and Apparel Group will hold 45%. In March 2024, Nysaa opened its first store at the City Centre Mirdif in Dubai, and in May announced a partnership with Kay Beauty, a beauty brand owned by Katrina Kaif to offer its products through Nysaa stores.

As of February 2023, Apparel Group launched 19 new store locations in UAE, Qatar, Bahrain, KSA, and India. In March, the group entered into a partnership with the Indian ayurvedic brand, Forest Essentials to distribute their skincare products through the Apparel Group's stores. In May, Apparel Group announced the opening of 12 new retail stores at Al Khiran Mall in Kuwait. In September, the group agreed with Firehouse Subs to operate 100 restaurants in the United Arab Emirates and Oman. In November, in association with Forever New, the apparel group opened 3 Forever New stores in Kuwait.

Through 2023, the Group launched 350 new stores in various locations and entered into partnerships with brands including Forest Essentials, Allo Beirut, and Asics. In February 2024, Apparel Group launched a shoe design studio at KidZania, Dubai Mall. In May, Apparel Group launched its first Forever New store at Doha Festival City in Qatar.

In June 2024, Apparel Group launched the first branch of Allo Beirut, a Dubai-born Lebanese street food restaurant in the Al Olaya district, Riyadh. In September, the company entered into a franchise partnership with Carrefour to expand into India, and signed an agreement with Barbour to become its exclusive distribution partner in the UAE, Saudi Arabia, Bahrain, Kuwait, Oman, and Qatar. In October, Apparel Group participated in a $10 million seed funding round for UAE-based proptech startup Prypco led by Shorooq Partners.

In October 2025, AppCorp Holding, the parent company of Apparel Group, launched KORA Properties, a real estate development company, with its first development IL VENTO announced in Dubai Maritime City.

In 2026, Kora Properties, entered into a joint venture with AVENEW Development to develop O1NE District, a mixed-use commercial district in Dubai Motor City adjacent to the Dubai Autodrome.

As of February 2026, Apparel Group operated more than 800 stores in Saudi Arabia, with 150 new stores opened through 2025.

== Operations ==
Apparel Group operates in 14 countries, mostly in the GCC region, including the UAE, Oman, Bahrain, Kuwait, Saudi Arabia, Malaysia, Thailand, Singapore, Indonesia, India, Pakistan, Egypt, and South Africa. The group has over 85 brands.
