= Falguni Nayar =

Indian businesswoman (born 1963)

- Born: 1963 (age 62–63); Mumbai, Maharashtra, India
- Other name: Falguni Sanjay Nayar
- Education: MBA Finance
- Alma mater: Sydenham College of Commerce and Economics, Mumbai; Indian Institute of Management Ahmedabad
- Occupations: Founder & CEO of Nykaa
- Employer: Kotak Mahindra Bank (1993–2012)
- Spouse: Sanjay Nayar (m. 1987)
- Children: 2

Falguni Sanjay Nayar (née Mehta; born 1963) is an Indian billionaire businesswoman, who is the founder and CEO of the beauty and lifestyle retail company Nykaa, formally known as FSN E-Commerce Ventures which is an acronym of her own name.

As per Forbes list of India’s 100 richest tycoons, dated October 09, 2024, Falguni Nayar & family was ranked 71st with a net worth of $4.2 Billion.

== Early life and education ==
Falguni Mehta was born and raised in a Gujarati family in Mumbai, Maharashtra. Her father was a businessman and ran a small bearings company, assisted by her mother. She is a graduate in B.Com from Sydenham College of Commerce and Economics and a postgraduate from the Indian Institute of Management Ahmedabad (1985 batch).

== Career ==
In 1993, Nayar joined Kotak Mahindra Group after leaving her consultant job at A. F. Ferguson & Co. She was initially the head of mergers and acquisitions (M&A) team at Kotak Mahindra, before going on to open institutional equities offices in London and New York City. In 2001, she returned to India. In 2005, she was appointed as the managing director of Kotak Mahindra Capital, the investment banking unit, and director of Kotak Securities, the institutional equities arm. She quit her job in 2012.

In April 2012, she founded Nykaa with $2 million of her own money. Nykaa was worth $2.3 billion as of 2021 bringing Nayar's net worth to an estimated $1.1 billion. In 2021, Nayar was described as one of two self-made female Indian billionaires, the other being Kiran Mazumdar-Shaw. Nykaa listed at $13 billion valuation on 10 November 2021. Soon after Nykaa went public, Nayar became the wealthiest self-made Indian woman, with her net worth rising to $6.5 billion. In 2022, Nayar made her debut in the Forbes India Rich List at rank 44. She was awarded EY entrepreneur of the year for India in 2021.

== Personal life ==
Falguni Nayar married Sanjay Nayar in the year 1987, who was her classmate at IIM Ahmedabad. He is the CEO of Kohlberg Kravis Roberts India. They have two children – Adwaita Nayar and Anchit Nayar, who are twins; Adwaita is the CEO of Nykaa Fashion whereas Anchit heads the retail and e-commerce divisions.
