= Nykaa =

Indian online beauty retailer

- Type: Public
- Traded as: NSE: NYKAA; BSE: 543384
- Industry: Consumer goods
- Founded: April 2012; 14 years ago
- Founder: Falguni Nayar
- Headquarters: Mumbai, Maharashtra, India
- Area served: India
- Key people: Falguni Nayar (Executive Chairperson, Managing Director & CEO); Anchit Nayar (Executive Director & CEO, Nykaa Beauty); Adwaita Nayar (Co-founder and Executive Director of Nykaa, and the CEO of House of Nykaa and Nykaa Fashion)
- Products: Cosmetics; skin care; perfume; hair color; personal care
- Revenue: ▲₹7,950 crore (US$830 million) (2025)
- Operating income: ▲₹474 crore (US$49 million) (2025)
- Net income: ▲₹72 crore (US$7.5 million) (2025)
- Owner: Nayar family (53.5%)
- Number of employees: 2,000+ (2021)
- Website: www.nykaa.com
- Footnotes; Financials as of 31 March 2025.

FSN E-Commerce Ventures Ltd, doing business as Nykaa, is an Indian retail company, headquartered in Mumbai. It sells beauty, wellness and fashion products online and through physical stores. It also operates an eB2B distribution business called Superstore by Nykaa.

In 2020, it became the first Indian unicorn startup headed by a woman. Nykaa was listed on the National Stock Exchange and Bombay Stock Exchange in November 2021 following its initial public offering.

== History ==
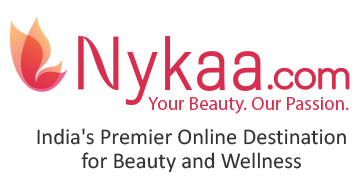
Logo used in the initial years.

Nykaa was founded in April 2012 by Falguni Nayar, a former investment banker and Managing Director at Kotak Mahindra Capital. The company launched as an online beauty retailer in 2012 and began commercial operations in 2013. Its first offline store opened in the Delhi airport in 2014.

In 2015, Nykaa launched its own brands with Nykaa Cosmetics. Its owned brands would later develop into its House of Nykaa business.

In 2018, Nykaa expanded into fashion with the launch of Nykaa Fashion.

In 2020, it became the first Indian unicorn startup headed by a woman. In November 2020, global asset management firm Fidelity invested in the company through a secondary sale of shares from multiple equity sellers.

In 2020, the company announced the launch of Nykaa Man the same year, targeting men’s grooming and fashion.

Nykaa opened its initial public offering (IPO) in late October 2021 and was listed on the NSE and BSE on 10 November 2021. The IPO raised ₹5,352 crore (US$724.05 million) at a valuation of US$7.4 billion. Following the listing, founder Falguni Nayar became India’s wealthiest self-made female billionaire.

In 2022, Nykaa partnered with Apparel Group to sell beauty products in the UAE, Saudi Arabia, Qatar, Oman, Kuwait and Bahrain. In 2024, Nykaa and the Apparel Group entered a 55:45 joint venture to launch Nysaa in Gulf countries.

== Operations ==
Nykaa operates a hybrid model, with an inventory-led approach for beauty and personal care products and a marketplace model for fashion.

It has three offline store formats called Nykaa Luxe, Nykaa On Trend and Nykaa beauty kiosks. The Luxe format features international luxury beauty brands such as Huda Beauty, MAC, Dior, and Givenchy, along with Nykaa Beauty, the in-house collection of beauty products. The Nykaa On Trend sells curated products.

Nykaa has retail and distribution subsidiaries in the Gulf region, including Nysaa Cosmetics Trading in Qatar for the export and retail sale of beauty and personal care products, and Nysaa Trading LLC in Saudi Arabia.

=== House of Nykaa ===
Nykaa has in-house brands within beauty and fashion. Some of them include:

- Beauty Brands – Dot & Key, Nykaa Naturals, Nykaa Cosmetics, Kay Beauty
- Nykaa Fashion – Nykd by Nykaa, 20 Dresses, RSVP, Mondano, Likha, Pipa Bella

In 2015, Nykaa launched its collection of in-house beauty products via Nykaa Cosmetics. Nykaa Naturals sells skincare and personal care products. In early 2019, the brand launched its Wanderlust Bath & Body collection, and later in the year introduced a beauty line with designer Masaba Gupta, Masaba by Nykaa. The same year, it launched its first celebrity partnership brand, Kay Beauty, with actress Katrina Kaif. Kay beauty also retails in UK through a partnership with luxury beauty retailer Space NK.

=== Acquisitions ===
In May 2019, Nykaa acquired 20Dresses.com, a private women's styling platform.

In 2021, Nykaa Fashion acquired the India fashion jewellery brand, Pipa Bella, and 51% stake in the Indian skincare brand, Dot & Key (additional 39% acquired in 2024).

In 2022, Nykaa acquired an 18.51% stake in Indian skincare brand Earth Rhythm (majority stake acquired in 2024). It then completed the 100% acquisition of lifestyle content platform Little Black Book (LBB). In the same year, it acquired 60% stake in dietary supplements and nutricosmetics brand Nudge Wellness (100% acquired in 2025) and 100% stake in athleisure brand KICA.

== Awards and Recognitions ==
- Featured in TIME 100 Most Influential Companies (2022)
- The Disruptor of the Year at 17th India Business Leader Awards, 2022
- Featured on Kantar BrandZ 2022 list as one of India’s most valuable brands

== Content platforms ==
Nykaa hosts beauty and fashion content its YouTube channel, Nykaa TV. It contains informational videos about beauty, cosmetics, and styling.

Since 2018, it has been hosting an online community of beauty and fashion enthusiasts via its Nykaa Network. In 2020, it launched a web miniseries called The Beauty Bar. Nykaa also hosts Beauty Book, a beauty and fashion magazine.

== Other activities ==
Since 2015, Nykaa has hosted the ‘Nykaa Femina Beauty Awards’ in partnership with women's lifestyle magazine Femina (India).

In 2019, Nykaa Fashion launched ‘The Power List’ in partnership with Vogue India.

== Criticism ==
=== Security issues ===
On 18 November 2019, an API flaw was detected in Nykaa Fashion's internal systems that allowed a potential attacker to log in to any user account if the attacker had access to the user's email ID. Consequently, the company fixed the security vulnerability.

=== Corporate governance ===
In November 2022, Nykaa issued 5:1 bonus shares to coincide with the expiry date of pre-IPO shareholders' lock-in period. The bonus issue resulted in the company's corporate governance practices receiving heavy criticism, with questions raised over the timing and motive of the issuance along with concerns of market manipulation and tax avoidance. Later that month, CFO Arvind Agarwal resigned from the company, even as the Securities and Exchange Board of India began scrutinizing the allotment of bonus shares.

In February 2023, defending the bonus share issuance, CEO Falguni Nayar, a former investment banker, claimed that the company had "assumed shareholders would be able to start trading the bonus shares within 4-5 days of the shareholder voting on the issue."

== See also ==
- Ecommerce in India
- Meesho
