= Forest Essentials =

Indian Ayurvedic company

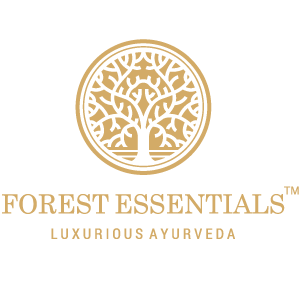
- The company logo depicting the tree of life

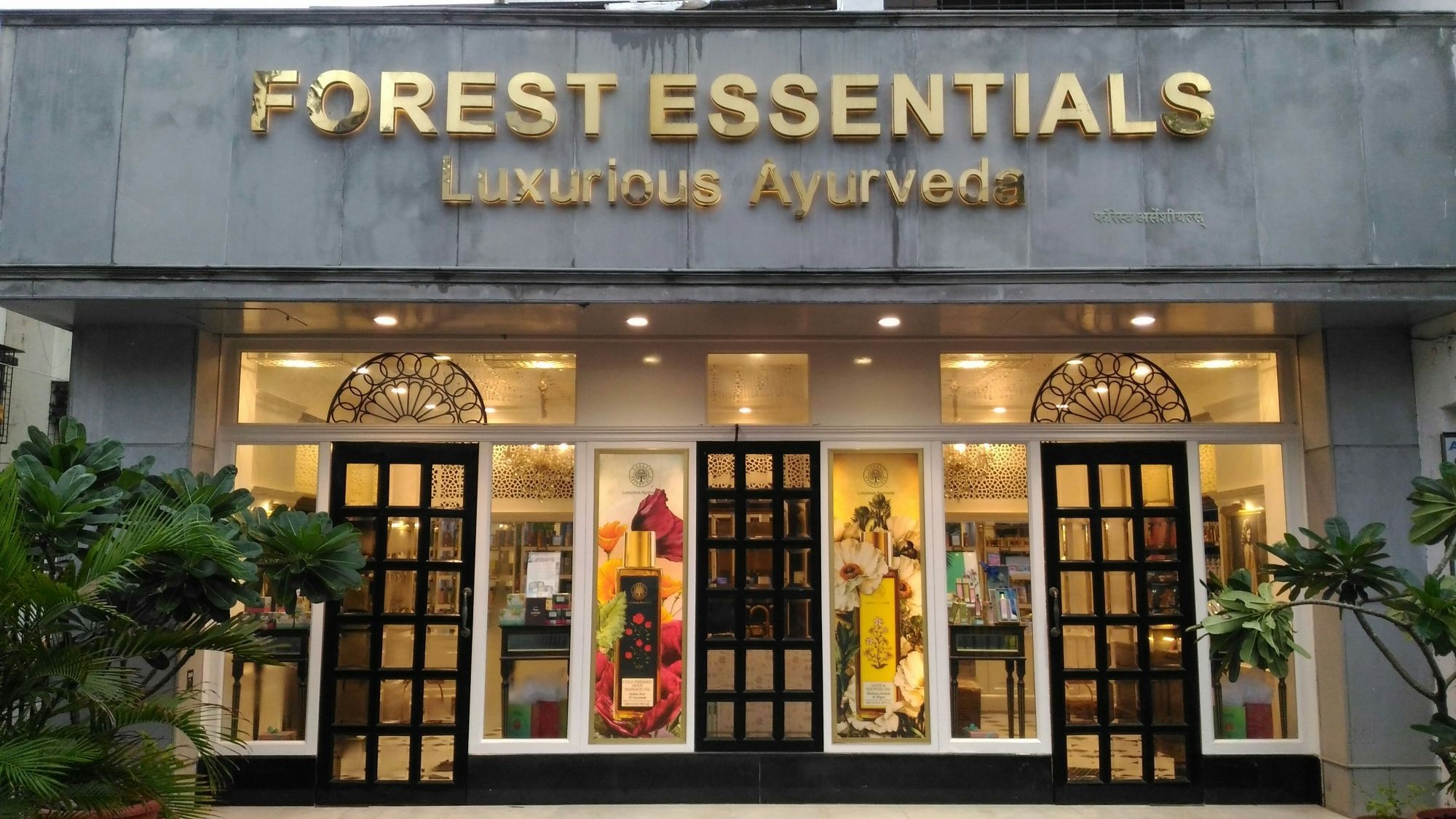
- Forest Essentials, Juhu, Mumbai
- Type: Private
- Industry: Wellness, Cosmetics
- Founded: 2000; 26 years ago
- Founder: Mira Kulkarni
- Headquarters: New Delhi, India
- Area served: India; Australia; United Arab Emirates; United Kingdom; United States
- Key people: Samrath Bedi, Managing Director
- Revenue: US$4 million
- Number of employees: 135 (2018)
- Website: Official website

Forest Essentials is an Indian cosmetics, skincare and perfume company that specializes in Ayurvedic preparations for its products. It was founded in 2000 by Mira Kulkarni in New Delhi, India.

== History ==
Mira Kulkarni started the business in 2000 with an investment of ₹2 lakhs, then only selling handmade soaps and candles. The business expanded after the Delhi hotel Hyatt Regency ordered the soaps for their rooms. In 2005–2006, the company posted sales of ₹6 crore.

== Business ==
In 2008, the New York-based Estée Lauder Companies acquired a 20% stake in the company, and in October 2021, the brand announced entering the United Kingdom by opening 12 retail stores. Kulkarni's son Samrath Bedi currently serves as the managing director of the company.

The company has 130 Forest Essentials Stores in India, supplies to 190 hotels and export to 120 countries. The factories are in Haridwar and Lodsi in Tehri Garhwal district, Uttarakhand.

Forest Essentials sells natural, organic and Ayurvedic cosmetics and has a policy of not testing their products on animals.

In November 2022, Forest Essentials opened its first standalone store in Covent Garden, London which would become the brand's first international store.

As of March 2026, the Estée Lauder Companies purchased the remaining 51% of shares leading to a full acquisition of the brand.
