= Sarit Centre =

Shopping mall in Nairobi, Kenya

- Location: Westlands, Nairobi, Kenya
- Coordinates: 1°15′35″S 36°48′5″E
- Opened: 1983; 43 years ago
- Owner: Vidhu Shah; Maneklal Rughani
- Floor area: 74,000 m^{2} (800,000 sq ft)
- Floors: 6
- Parking: 4,000
- Website: sarityourcity.com

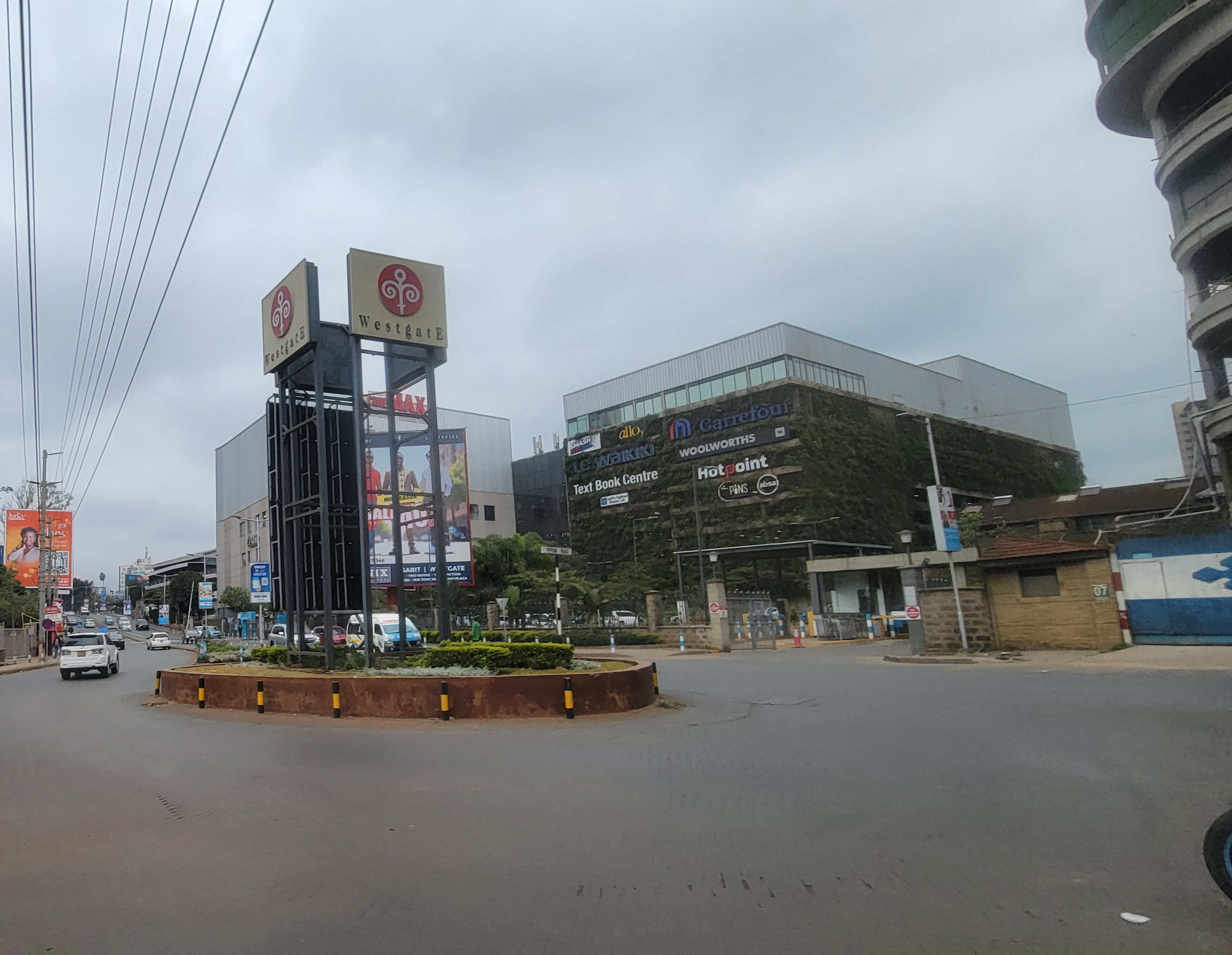
Sarit Centre

Sarit is a shopping centre in the Westlands neighbourhood of Nairobi, Kenya. Opened in 1983, it is first ever shopping centre to be launched in independent Kenya. Following its expansion, Sarit Centre is the largest mall in East & Central Africa with 800,000 square feet of retail space.

== Overview ==
Construction of Sarit Centre began in 1981, with its architectural design based on the Brent Cross Shopping Centre in London. With the rising political instability in the early 1980s, construction was halted and the business class that had applied for the 200 rental units withdrew as others left Kenya. The mall was opened in April 1983 with only two tenants: Uchumi Supermarket and Text Book Centre – Uchumi Supermarket chain later closed in 2018, while Text Book Centre remains operational to-date. The shopping centre was fully let by the end of 1984.

Over the years, Sarit Centre, has undergone three architectural and constructional revamps that has redefined the centre's initial purpose of commercial centre to a more mixed-use development, making it the largest shopping centre in Kenya. Development of the third and most recent phase which was primarily retail began in 2017.

Sarit, like any other shopping centre, provides an array of services from a retail supermarkets; fast food restaurants; fashion and accessories shops; electronics and technology shops; banking and services; a movie theatre; gym; gaming establishments; and outdoor recreation centre.
