= Two Rivers Mall =

Shopping mall in Nairobi, Kenya

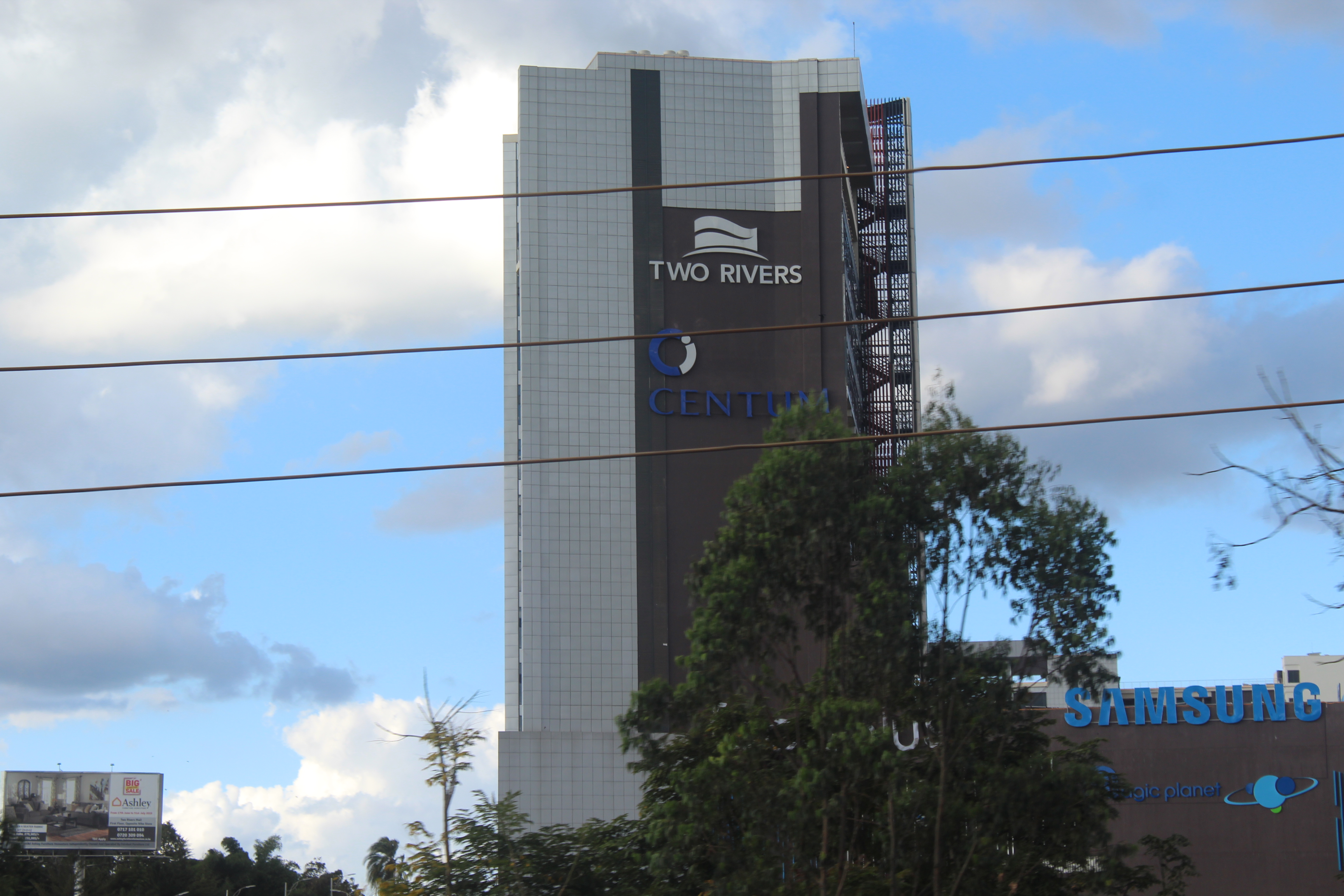

General information
- Location: Runda, Nairobi, Kenya
- Coordinates: 1°12′38″S 36°47′40″E
- Opened: 17 February 2017; 8 years ago
- Owner: Centum Group (58%); Avic International (39%); ICDC (3%)

Technical details
- Floor area: 67,000 m^{2} (720,000 sq ft)

Design and construction
- Architect: Boogertman + Partners
- Structural engineer: Howard Humphreys

Other information
- Parking: 1,046 spaces

Website
- tworiversmall.com

Two Rivers Mall is a shopping centre located in Nairobi, Kenya. With 67,000 sqm of gross lettable area, it is the largest shopping mall in sub-Saharan Africa outside of South Africa.

== History ==
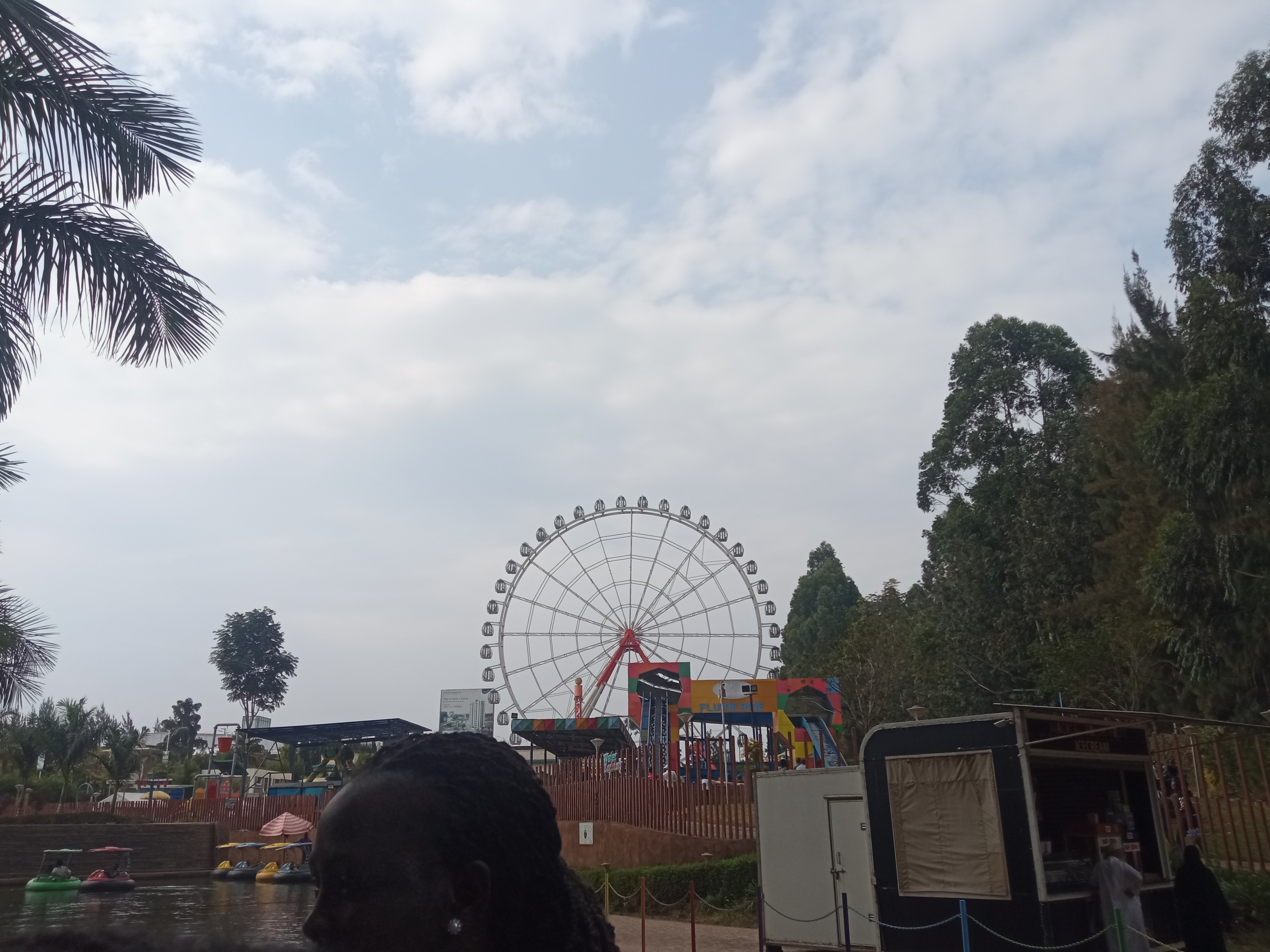
The "Eye of Kenya" in Two Rivers Mall, the largest ferris wheel in Africa

The building is managed by Athena Properties Limited. It opened on 14 February 2017 to the public, with Kenyan President Uhuru Kenyatta cutting the ribbon to symbolise the official opening of the mall on 17 February 2017. Its key shareholding was acquired by Chinese investors with the aim of tapping into Nairobi's growing international status as an aviation hub and a centre for commercial enterprise. In 2022, the mall unveiled the largest cinema screen in East and Central Africa. It also opened a ferris wheel in 2019 dubbed "The Eye of Kenya" which stands at 60 metres, making it the largest ferris wheel in Africa.
