= Indian company law =

Indian company law regulates corporations formed under Section 2(20) of the Indian Companies Act, 2013, superseding the Companies Act, 1956.

== History ==
The Companies Act, 2013 superseded the Companies Act, 1956, under whose provisions Indian corporations previously operated. In addition to the Companies Act, corporations are subject to other regulations administered by the Ministry of Corporate Affairs (MCA), which has two branches: the Regional Director (RD) and the Registrar of Companies (ROC). At present, India has seven RDs and 22 ROCs. These two branches are also called in-house sources of adjudication.

=== Recent changes in Indian Company law ===
- Companies Act 2013
- Companies (1st Amendment) Act, 2015
- Companies (2nd Amendment) Act 2017
- Companies (3rd Amendment) Act 2019
- Companies (Amendment) Bill 2020
- Companies Fresh Start Scheme 2020
- Companies (Amendment) Ordinance 2018
- Companies (1st Amendment) Ordinance 2019
- Companies (2nd Amendment) Ordinance 2019

=== 2015 amendment act ===
The Amendment Act (21 of 2015), passed to consolidate and amend the Companies Act, 2013, received assent from the President of India on 25 May 2015, and contained 23 sections. Official notice was published in the Gazette of India, specifying 29 May as the date on which sections 1–13 and 15–23 of the act would come into force.

Indian companies may be incorporated as either private or public. Under the original Act, both required certain amounts of paid-up capital; private companies required ₹100,000 (1 lakh) and public companies required ₹500,000 (5 lakh). However, the Amendment Act abolished these limits, in order to increase the ease of doing business. It also permitted substitution of company seals with human signatures to sign documents.

=== 2017 amendment act ===
The Ministry of Corporate Affairs promulgated a new Act on 26 January 2018, constituting 93 sections; of them, approximately 90 were announced by the Ministry through a series of eleven notifications (with the latest issued on 19 September 2018). Several modifications were made to the original Act by this amendment, mostly to improve its clarity and concision; among other changes, section 134 of the 2013 act was modified to require financial statements to carry the signatures of CEOs.

=== 2020 amendment bill ===
A bill (88 of 2020) to amend the Companies Act, 2013 was introduced in the Lok Sabha on 17 March, by Finance Minister Nirmala Sitharaman, received the President's assent, and was announced on 28 September 2020. It decriminalized minor offenses (eliminating imprisonment as a consequence for over 46 offenses defined by the Act), permitted direct listing of Indian companies in certain foreign jurisdictions, added a new chapter for producer companies, and created exemptions to several requirements. These included setting up CSR committees and carry-forward mechanisms (previously set out in section 135 of the Companies Act, 2013) and filing of NBFC resolutions with the Registry of Companies (previously set out in section 117 of the Companies Act, 2013). It also provided the framework for exempting specific classes of companies and securities from the definition of "listed companies".

=== 2020 Companies Fresh Start Scheme ===
Under this scheme introduced by the MCA, between 1 April 2020 and 30 September 2020, defaulting companies were provided a one-time opportunity to perform a "fresh start" and make their defaults good by filing belated documents (including annual returns and financial statements) without payment of any fee other than the normal statutory fee. Companies were, furthermore, provided some immunity to prosecution. Inactive companies were also permitted to obtain the status of a "dormant company" under section 455 of the Companies Act, 2013.

=== The Companies (Amendment) Ordinance 2018 ===
On 13 July 2018, the MCA assembled a committee to review specific terms of reference for the offenses under the Companies Act, 2013. The committee was directed by the authority to make its report public within 30 days of its first meeting; accordingly, the committee furnished the report on 14 August 2018. Some amendments recommended for immediate implementation included:

- Enlarging the jurisdictions of the two branches of the MCA (the Registrar of Companies and Regional Directors, also called the "in-house adjudications mechanism").
- Shifting the approvals process from tribunals to the in-house adjudication mechanism.
- Recategorizing the offenses punishable by imprisonment to be resolved through civil liabilities.
- Implementing 33 provisions of the original Act.

Unlike previous amendments to acts, which went before houses of the Indian parliament to be brought into law, these modifications were considered urgent enough to promulgate immediately as ordinances.

== Incorporation ==
Incorporating a company in India requires preparation of several documents. Requirements vary based on type of company. Historically, there have been various types of corporations incorporated under different regulations:

- Companies incorporated under royal charter, a practice employed by the British government. For example, the British East India Company came under a royal charter, which means it was granted a charter by the King or the Queen of Britain, and was controlled by the charter. This type of incorporation is no longer performed.
- Companies incorporated by special legislature, such as the Indian Parliament or a state legislature. Examples of this include the Reserve Bank of India or State Bank of India.
- Companies incorporated under the Indian Companies Act, 1956, which come under the memorandum of association and articles of association.

Modern companies, however, fall into the following categories.

- Sole proprietorship: also known as a trader firm or proprietorship exclusively owned by one person, a sole proprietor may use a trading name or business name other than his or her name.
- Unregistered: some business activities do not require formal incorporation, and registration is not compulsory; this is sometimes an appealing option due to the ease of setting up operations and lack of required compliance activities. However, the main disadvantage is unlimited liability.
- Partnership: liability is joint and unlimited.
  - Active partners take part in day-to-day operations of the business, in addition to investing in it; they are entitled to a share of profits.
  - Sleeping partners invest in the business and are entitled to a share of its profits, but do not participate in day-to-day operations.
- Limited Liability Partnership: a partnership in which the partners' liability is limited.
- Hindu Undivided Family (HUF): businesses owned by a joint family. While this conventionally involves Hindu families, Jain and Sikh families (while not governed by the Hindu law) can still form a HUF.
- Cooperative
- consortium
- Joint venture
- nidhi company
- Family Owned Business
- private held company
- startup company
- Dormant company: a company created either for use in a future project or for holding assets (including intellectual property).
- Private limited company: a company that may have 2–200 shareholders, whose shares are held privately and cannot be offered to the public.
- Small Company: a non-public company whose paid-up capital does not exceed ₹5,000,000 (50 lakh), and whose turnover does not exceed ₹10,000,000 (one crore).
- Public Limited Company: a category analogous to the category of the same name in other systems of corporate law.
- Public Sector Undertaking (PSU): alternatively known as a Public Sector Enterprise (PSE). A PSU may be a public limited company (listed on stock exchanges) or unlisted entity, with majority ownership by a government body. Some of these entities are formed as business entities through special legislation, where these entities are governed by the statutes of these legislation and may or may not be governed by company laws like a typical business entity.
- Unlimited Company - A company, similar to its limited counterpart, but where the liability of the members or shareholders is not limited.

== Corporate governance ==
Section 149 of the Companies Act, 2013 mandates that every company shall have a board of directors.

The provisions of the Companies Act, 2013 (section 169) establish that any company director may be removed by the general meeting with a simple majority vote, after giving "special notice" of 28 days. In companies which elect the board by proportional representation according to section 163, there is an exception, so that directors appointed by one particular group of members cannot be ousted by the majority. Those directors can only be removed by the members that appointed them, so as to protect the system of proportional voting.

=== Employee rights ===
It was the view of many in the Indian Independence Movement, including Mahatma Gandhi, that workers had as much of a right to participate in management of firms as shareholders or other property owners. Article 43A of the Constitution, established by the Forty-second Amendment of the Constitution of India in 1976, created a right to codetermination, requiring legislation to "secure the participation of workers in the management of undertakings". However, like other rights in Part IV, this article is not directly enforceable; it instead creates a duty upon state organs to implement its principles through legislation (and potentially through court cases). In 1978, the Sachar Report recommended legislation for inclusion of workers on boards; however, this has not yet been implemented.

The Industrial Disputes Act 1947 (section 3) created a right of participation in joint work councils to "provide measures for securing amity and good relations between the employer and workmen and, to that end to comment upon matters of their common interest or concern and endeavour to compose any material difference of opinion in respect of such matters". However, trade unions had not taken up these options on a large scale. In National Textile Workers Union v Ramakrishnan the Supreme Court (with Bhagwati J giving the leading judgment) held that employees had a right to be heard in a winding-up petition of a company, because their interests were directly affected, and their standing was not excluded by the wording of section 398 of the Companies Act, 1956.

- Excel Wearv. Union of India A.I.R. 1979 S.C. 25, 36

=== Directors' duties ===
Duties of directors.

166. (1) Subject to the provisions of this Act, a director of a company shall act in accordance with the articles of the company.
(2) A director of a company shall act in good faith in order to promote the objects of the company for the benefit of its members as a whole, and in the best interests of the company, its employees, the shareholders, the community and for the protection of environment.
(3) A director of a company shall exercise his/her duties with due and reasonable care, skill and diligence and shall exercise independent judgment.
(4) A director of a company shall not involve in a situation in which he may have a direct or indirect interest that conflicts, or possibly may conflict, with the interest of the company.
(5) A director of a company shall not achieve or attempt to achieve any undue gain or advantage either to himself or to his relatives, partners, or associates and if such director is found guilty of making any undue gain, he shall be liable to pay an amount equal to that gain to the company.
(6) A director of a company shall not assign his office and any assignment so made shall be void.
(7) If a director of the company contravenes the provisions of this section such director shall be punishable with fine which shall not be less than one lakh rupees but which may extend to five lakh rupees.

— Companies Act 2013 section 166

Directors owe a range of duties to the company, which primarily involve acting within its constitution, avoiding conflicts of interest, and performing their role to a desired standard of competence. The Companies Act 2013 (section 166) lists directors' duties, which reflect existing principles developed by case law in most Commonwealth countries, in common law and equity. Part of the reason for codification of directors' duties was to provide a transparent statement of the duties directors owe, thereby publicizing principles of best practice.

=== Corporate social responsibility ===
In a new with the Companies Act 2013, section 135 requires companies to spend 2% of their net profit on socially responsible projects, if they have a net worth of over ₹5,000,000,000 (500 crore), or a turnover of over ₹10,000,000,000 (1000 crore), or a net profit over ₹50,000,000 (5 crore). Socially responsible projects are defined in Schedule VIII, and mainly involve community development.

== Enforcement ==
- National Company Law Tribunal, replacing the previous Company Law Board and Board for Industrial and Financial Reconstruction.
- Indian Corporate Law Service

== See also ==
- UK company law
- European company law
- US corporate law
