= Indian Corporate Law Service =

Government of India Civil Service

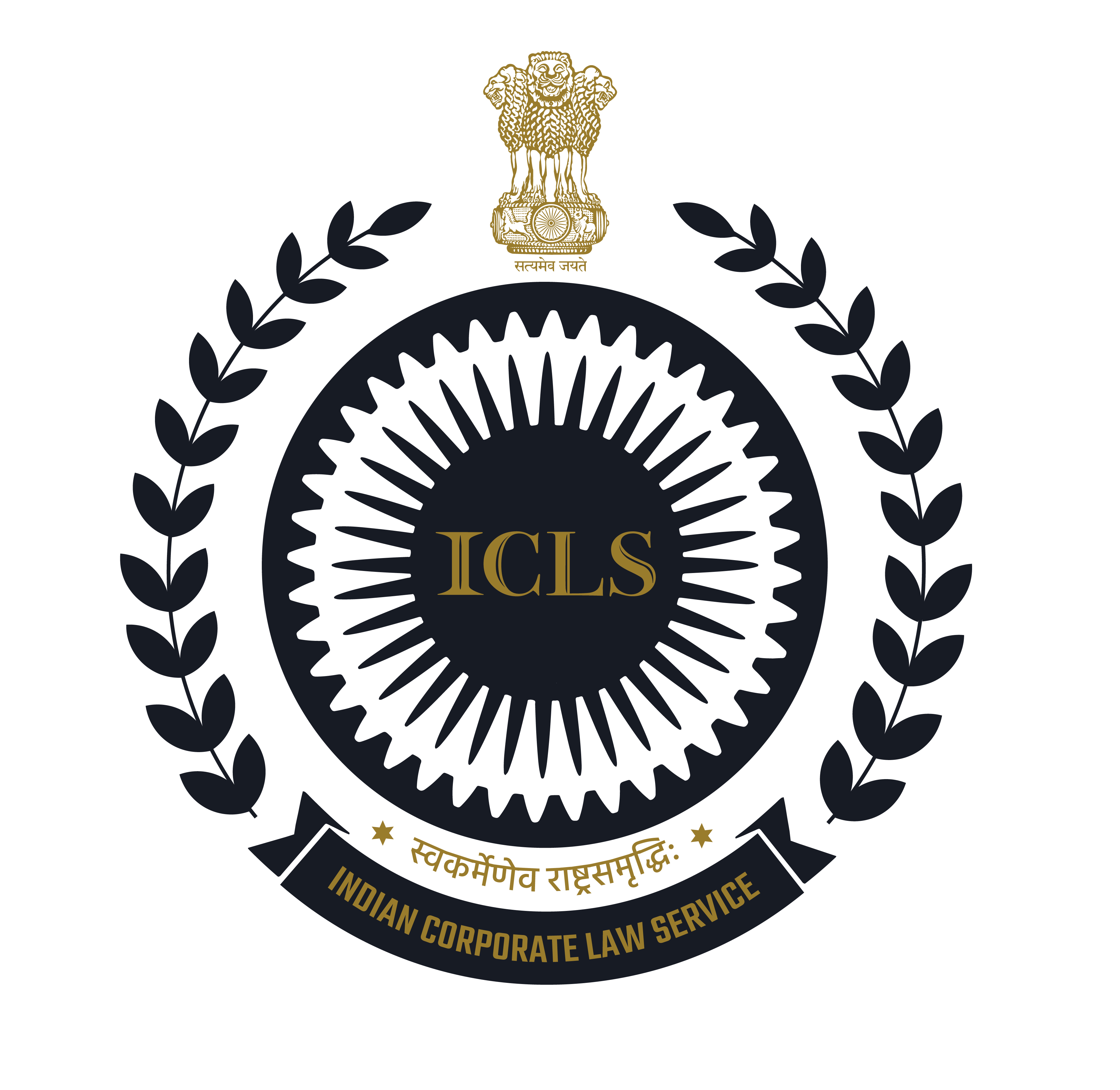
- Logo for the Indian Corporate Law Service

Service Overview
- Abbreviation: ICLS
- Founded: 1967 (Reconsituted as an Organised Civil Service in 2008)
- Headquarters: Shastri Bhawan, New Delhi
- Country: India
- Training: ICLS Academy, Indian Institute of Corporate Affairs, Manesar, Haryana
- Cadre Controlling Authority: Ministry of Corporate Affairs, Government of India
- Minister responsible: Minister of Corporate Affairs, Government of India
- Legal Personality: Governmental; Civil Service
- Duties: Regulator of Corporate Sector in India
- Cadre Size: 291

Head of the Civil Services of India
- Cabinet Secretary: T. V. Somanathan, IAS

The Indian Corporate Law Service (Hindi: भारतीय कॉरपोरेट विधि सेवा), abbreviated as ICLS, is one of the Central Civil Services (Group A) and it functions under the Ministry of Corporate Affairs, Government of India. The service is entrusted with the responsibility of the implementation of Companies Act, 1956(now repealed), Companies Act, 2013 and the Limited liability Partnership Act, 2008.

== History ==
Created in the year 1967 as a service to administer the Companies Act, 1956 as the Company Law Service, it was renamed as Indian Company Law Service in the year 2002. The service functioned under Ministry of Finance (Department of Company Affairs) till 2004, after which an independent ministry by the name Ministry of Corporate Affairs was created to administer the Corporate Sector in India. The service was renamed as Indian Corporate Law Service in 2008 and was brought into the fold of Civil Services Examination. The first batch of Officers recruited through Civil Services Examination were inducted in the year 2009.The decision to bring the service ICLS into the fold of civil services was instrumental for regulating the complex corporate landscape which is getting evolved day by day. Since 2016, Director General of Corporate Affairs (DGCoA) is the top most bureaucrat from ICLS who is equivalent to Special Secretary/Secretary to the Union of India.

== Recruitment and Training ==
The Officers of Indian Corporate Law Service are recruited via two modes - Direct Recruitment and Departmental Promotions. Members belonging to Group B Posts such as Company Prosecutors & Senior Technical Assistants, employed with the Ministry are gradually promoted to ICLS after completely mandated residency period within their own services. The current ratio of two streams is kept at 3:2.

=== ICLS Academy ===
The ICLS Academy, located at Manesar, Haryana Campus of the Indian Institute of Corporate Affairs (IICA), provides training to Officer Trainees (OTs) to familiarize them with provisions of Companies Act, Limited Liability Act, Partnership Act and other corporate laws, Indian Penal Code, book keeping & accounts, etc. over a period of almost 20 months.

1. The Academy has entered into an Memorandum of Understanding (MOU) with Shri Ram College of Commerce for imparting training to the freshly inducted ICLS Officer Trainees in various subjects such as Introductory Accounting, Advanced Accountancy, Advanced Auditing, Corporate Finance and Corporate Valuation, Financial Derivatives and their Accounting, etc. to equip them with the conceptual and practical knowledge as well as necessary skill set.
2. The Academy has a Memorandum of Understanding with the National Law School of India University (NLSIU), Bengaluru, under which a Post Graduate Diploma in Business and Allied Laws (PGDBAL) is delivered to ICLS Officer Trainees during their induction course and to in-service ICLS officers. The programme covers law and legal systems, commercial and corporate laws, procedural laws, economic laws, administrative law and ethics. The MoU was renewed in 2025 for a period of five years.
3. The Academy is in tie-up with National Institute of Securities Markets (NISM), Mumbai, a public trust established in 2006 by the Securities and Exchange Board of India (SEBI), the regulator of the securities markets in India, organized 10 teaching day(s) programme on 'Understanding Securities Laws' for the ICLS Officer Trainee(s). The programme is aimed at capacity building of the officers by providing them with vital inputs on the role of SEBI and about the various regulations governing securities markets. The training programme also includes technical sessions on different topics related to securities markets and mock trading in simulation lab. The training also included visits to Stock Exchanges such as Bombay Stock Exchange, Clearing Corporations and Depositories, which provided the participants valuable practical exposure.
4. Training Program on Forensic Accounting, Big Data Analytics using CAAT Tools and Fraud Detection” by Digital Accounting & Assurance Board, the Institute of Chartered Accountants of India (ICAI).
5. Attachment with the Insolvency and Bankruptcy Board of India, wherein the Officer Trainees are provided with up-to-date insights, methodologies, and practical approaches necessary for effectively managing the intricacies of insolvency and bankruptcy proceedings. The expert faculty imparts a thorough understanding of the Insolvency and Bankruptcy Code, 2016 (IBC), including its nuances and practical application, to the officers using case studies to illustrate key concepts pertaining to different processes i.e. the Corporate Insolvency Resolution Process, Liquidation Process, voluntary liquidation, fast track resolution process, individual insolvency, and individual bankruptcy. The officers are introduced to various components of IBC ecosystem, namely, Adjudicating Authority, Insolvency Professional, Insolvency professional Agencies, Information Utility, Financial Creditors, Operational Creditors, Registered Valuers and Financial Service Providers.
6. The Officers also undergo a 2-3 week foreign study tour at National University of Singapore Faculty of Law, wherein a wide range of topics relating to international & comparative corporate law with a particular focus on Singaporean Corporate laws, regulations and practices are covered. The officers visit Singapore Exchange for understanding its role as a market regulator; the Singapore International Arbitration Centre and NUS Business School. To provide greater insight from industry practitioners, NUS Law also invites expert speakers from the private sector to engage with the officers on subjects such as international financings and Indian Companies, Indian Companies & their interaction with international capital markets other critical regulatory matters.

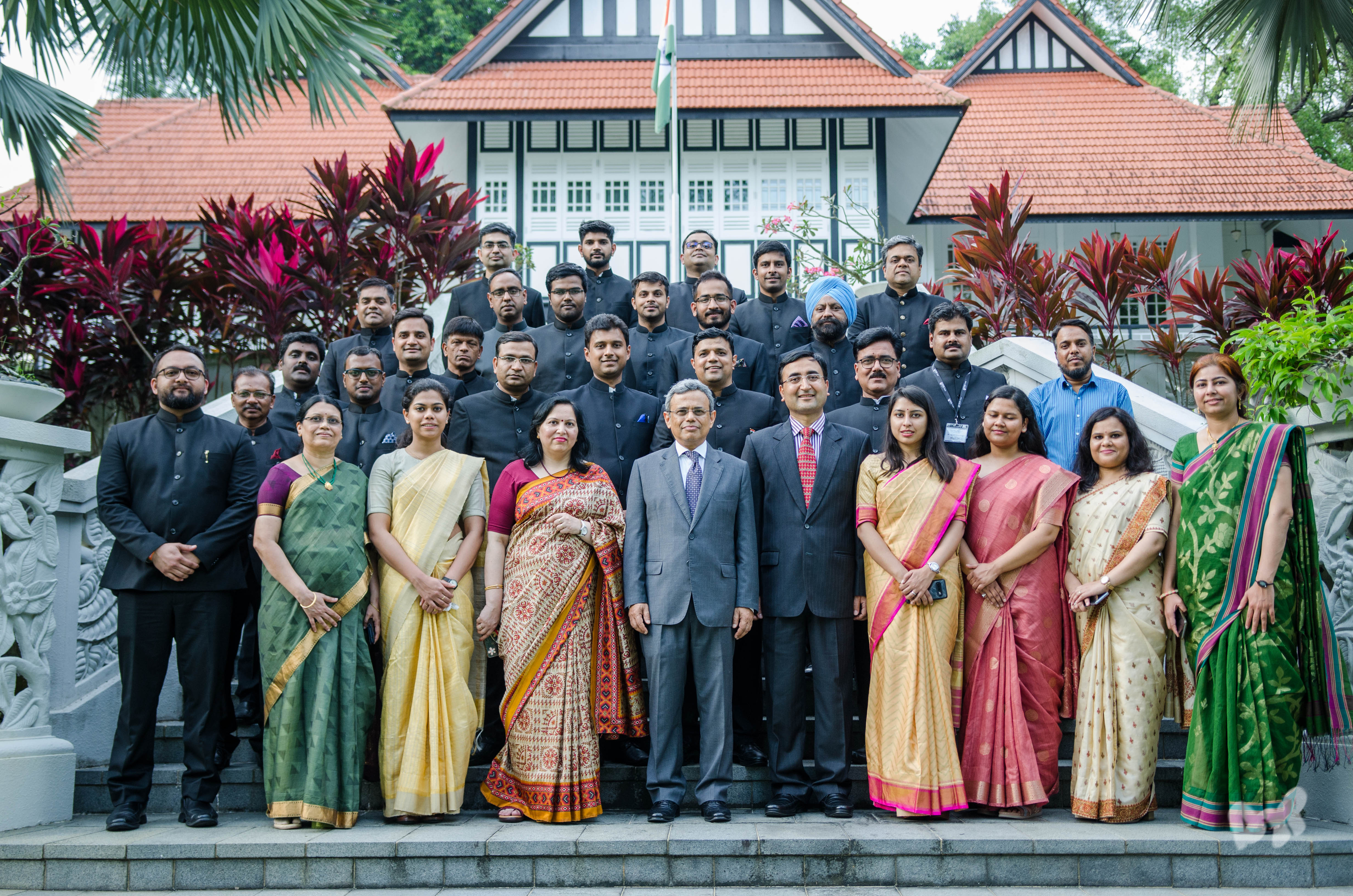
ICLS Officers paying courtesy visit to the High Commissioner of India to Singapore

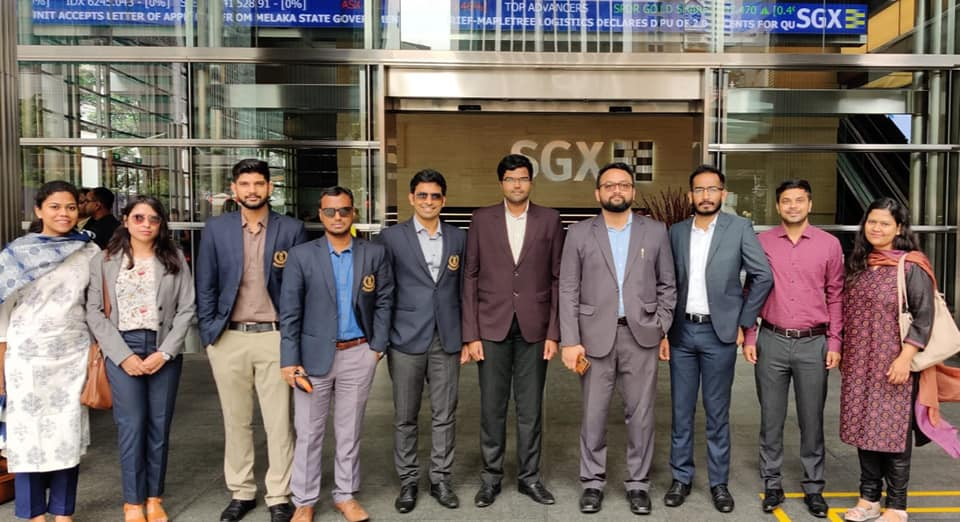
ICLS Officers outside the Singapore Exchange

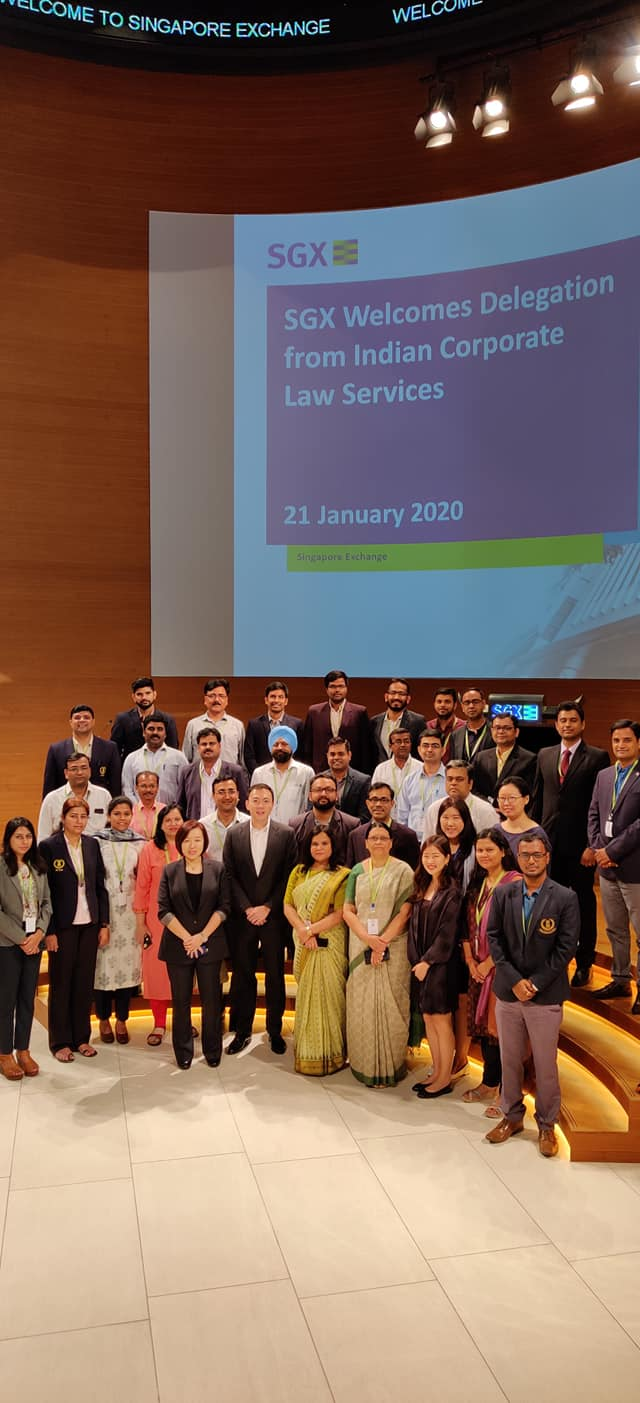
ICLS Officers with the officials of the Singapore Exchange

In addition to the classroom training the POs are also provided hands on training in various offices across India.

== Work profile ==
The role and functions of all the above-mentioned posts are defined either in the Companies Act, 2013 or in rules made by the Central Government in exercise of the powers delegated to it through the act. For instance, posts such as Regional Director, Registrar of Companies, the Official Liquidator, etc. are statutory posts, but posts such as the Director General of Corporate Affairs or Director of Inspection and Investigation are posts created by the Central Government in exercise of its powers. Apart from the traditional roles, ICLS officers in their capacity as ROCs in their respective jurisdiction are members of State Level Coordination Committees, Regional Economic Intelligence Committee, Market Intelligence Groups and several other groups sharing Economic Intelligence data with other Government Intelligence and law enforcement agencies. In J&K, ROC is a member of Terror Monitoring Group (TMG), set up by MHA to share information amongst the group members, which are all the enforcement agencies including IT, CGST, CBI, IB, JKP and ROC. ICLS Officers also work on special projects and with the state governments on deputation.

A brief description is provided below:

=== Ministry of Corporate Affairs, Headquarters, New Delhi ===
The ICLS officers posted at the Headquarters discharge various functions such as framing of policies, rules/regulations, issuing notifications and circulars, implementation of e-Governance in the Ministry, handling and supervising legal and court matters, to examine inspections and investigation reports and issuing appropriate orders, etc.

=== Director General of Corporate Affairs (DGCoA) ===
The office of DGCoA was constituted in 2008. The offices is headed by an ICLS officer of Higher Administrative Grade Scale, assisted by two ICLS Officers designated as Directors (Inspection and Investigation) of Senior Administrative Grade Scale. The office is also entrusted to be overall supervision matters relating to the Companies Act, 2013 and LLP Act, 2008.

=== Regional Directors ===
The Regional Director supervises the functioning of Registrars of Companies and Official Liquidators that fall within their jurisdiction, and is usually the senior most ICLS Officer in that region. There are seven Regional Directorates spread across the country, each having jurisdiction over multiple states and Union Territories. The RD has several quasi-judicial powers such as allowing mergers & amalgamation of certain categories of companies, issuing orders for approving shifting of the registered offices of a company and compounding of certain categories of offences committed either by the companies or officers of the companies. Further RD also has the appellate power over the adjudication orders passed by the Registrar of Companies against defaulting companies and their directors. The ICLS officers posted as Assistant Director or Deputy Director or Joint Director conduct and supervise inspections and investigations against the companies under the relevant provisions of the law.

=== Registrar of Companies (RoC) ===
Registrars of Companies have jurisdiction over the various States and Union Territories are vested with the primary duty of registering Companies and Limited Liability Partnerships (LLP) floated in the respective states and the Union Territories and ensuring that such companies and LLPs comply with statutory requirements under the Act, for instance periodic filing of Annual Returns and Balance Sheets, Change of directorship of the company, etc. The RoC has the power to take action against companies that fail to submit requisite documents in time or for production of incorrect/incomplete information. The registered documents are made available to the Shareholders, Investors and the General public at large through an online portal MCA21 at a payment of nominal fee. Corporates functioning in India will have to abide by all statutory requirements and it is the duty cast on the office of the Registrar of Companies to ensure that all norms are followed and that any violations are penalised as per the law. The jurisdictional RoC is first point of contact for stakeholders of the companies to approach in case of any grievance against the company or its management's conduct. The RoC also has suo-moto powers to conduct inquiry of companies and if deemed necessary, investigation can also be proposed to be carried out, all violations can be brought to book and both civil and criminal prosecution would be initiated. The ROCs are responsible for ensuring that the jurisdictional corporate entities do not use the corporate structure for perpetrating activities that are illegal or against the public and national interest. The ROCs have a major responsibility to keep the corporate registry clean and to ensure that illegal shell companies are identified and taken action against. Off late, the RoCs have been emerging as the primary government agencies working towards punishing errant companies facilitating high-risk equity investing from general public bypassing stock-exchange regulations and in enforcing corporate transparency with impactful actions relating to Significant Beneficial Ownership norms.

Various offices and centres headed by the ROCs are launched by the government in order to facilitate the businesses while ensuring effective enforcement. Central Processing Centre (CPC) have been operationalised for centralised processing of corporate filings without requiring any physical interaction with the stakeholders as part of the continuing reforms to provide ease of doing business. To enhance the oversight process and improve verification related process & checks and balances, Central Scrutiny Centre (CSC) were set up for carrying out scrutiny of Straight Through Processes (STP) e-forms filed by companies and forward the findings to the jurisdictional Registrar of Companies (RoCs) for further necessary action under the Companies Act. Centre for Processing Accelerated Corporate Exit (C-PACE) was launched to facilitate ‘Ease of Doing Business’ with an idea to facilitate and speed up the voluntary closure of companies to less than six months with process re-engineering.

The ROCs function under the overarching supervision of the Regional Directors, the DGCoA and the administrative control of the Ministry. There are over 2 Million companies registered in India, out of which more than 1.6 Million are reportedly active, and there are over 25 Field offices spread across the country, located in the capital cities of most states.

=== Official Liquidator (OL) ===
The Official Liquidators are officers appointed by the Central Government and are attached to various High Courts. The Official Liquidators are under the administrative charge of the respective Regional Directors, who supervise their functioning on behalf of the Ministry.

The Official Liquidator is responsible for winding up of the companies that are ordered to be wound up by the Hon'ble High Court under several grounds, the most common being the inability to pay its debts. The winding up process includes taking possession of the assets of a company ordered to be wound up, bringing the assets of the company to sale via public auction, recovery of debts due to the company, invitation of claims against the company from the creditors, settlement of claims so received, distribution of funds to the creditors and contributories, prosecution of directors of the company in the event of misfeasance and eventual dissolution of the company. Each High court has a liquidator attached to it. It may be noted that, with the implementation of Companies Act, 2013, the Official Liquidators would now be attached to National Company Law Tribunals, for all the liquidation matters that are ordered under the new Companies Act, 2013.

== Hierarchical Designations ==
The designations and time-scales within the Indian Corporate Law Service are as follows after cadre restructure:

Designation, Number and Scale of Pay of duty posts included in the various grades of Indian Corporate Law Service
S. No.	Grade & Scale	Designation	Number of posts
1.	Higher Administrative Grade (HAG)	Director General of Corporate Affairs; Additional Secretary to the Government of India on deputation through Central Staffing Scheme (CSS for AIS & Organised Group A central Service); Technical Member in Tribunals like NCLT, NCLAT, etc.; Member in IBBI	01
2.	Senior Administrative Grade (SAG)	Regional Director; Director of Inspection & Investigation; Director of Legal & Prosecution; Joint secretary to the Government of India on Deputation through Central Staffing Scheme (CSS) for AIS & Organised Group A central Services); Technical Member in Tribunals like NCLT, NCLAT, etc.	14
3.	Junior Administrative Grade - Non-functional Selection Grade (JAG - NFSG)	Director to the Government of India on deputation through Central Staffing Scheme (CSS for AIS & organised Group A Central Services)	**
4.	Junior Administrative Grade (JAG)	Registrar of Companies; Official Liquidator; Joint Director; Secretary, Company Law Board; Joint Director/Additional Director, SFIO; Additional General Manager/ General Manager, IEPF Authority; CAO, Indian Institute of Corporate Affairs, Manesar; Deputy Secretary to the Government of India on Deputation through Central Staffing Scheme (CSS for AIS & Organised Group A central Services)	81
5.	Senior Time Scale (STS)	Registrar of Companies; Official Liquidator; Deputy Registrar of Companies; Deputy Official Liquidator; Deputy Director, MCA HQs; Deputy Director, SFIO; Deputy Director, Indian Corporate Law Service Academy, Indian Institute of Corporate Affairs, Manesar; Deputy General Manager, IEPF Authority	98
6.	Junior Time Scale (JTS)	Entry level (Officer Trainee); Assistant Registrar of Companies; Assistant Official Liquidator; Assistant Director, Ministry of Corporate Affairs HQ; Senior Assistant Director, SFIO; Assistant General Manager, IEPF Authority	153

  - Note: The Junior Administrative Grade (Selection Mode) is Non-functional and the maximum number of posts in this grade is equal to 30 percent of the Senior Duty Posts.

== Contributions to Literature and Public Discourse ==
Similar to their counterparts in other All India and Central Civil Services, members of the Indian Corporate Law Service have engaged in creative pursuits in their individual lives beyond their official responsibilities. There are instances of ICLS officers authoring books that span various genres. Furthermore, a culture of creative expression is formally encouraged within the service itself; a notable example is UDAAN, a magazine published by ICLS Officer Trainees which serves as a platform for officers to share articles, poetry, and other creative writings. Officers have also contributed to public discourse by writing opinion columns and articles for newspapers and specialized journals, leveraging their domain expertise to offer insights on corporate law, governance, and economic policy.

== See also ==
- Companies House of the United Kingdom
- Accounting and Corporate Regulatory Authority of Singapore
- Senior Executive Service of the United States
