= Indian Institute of Corporate Affairs =

Civil Service Institute in India

Indian Institute of Corporate Affairs, Ministry of Corporate Affairs
- भारतीय कॉर्पोरेट कार्य संस्थान, कॉर्पोरेट कार्य मंत्रालय
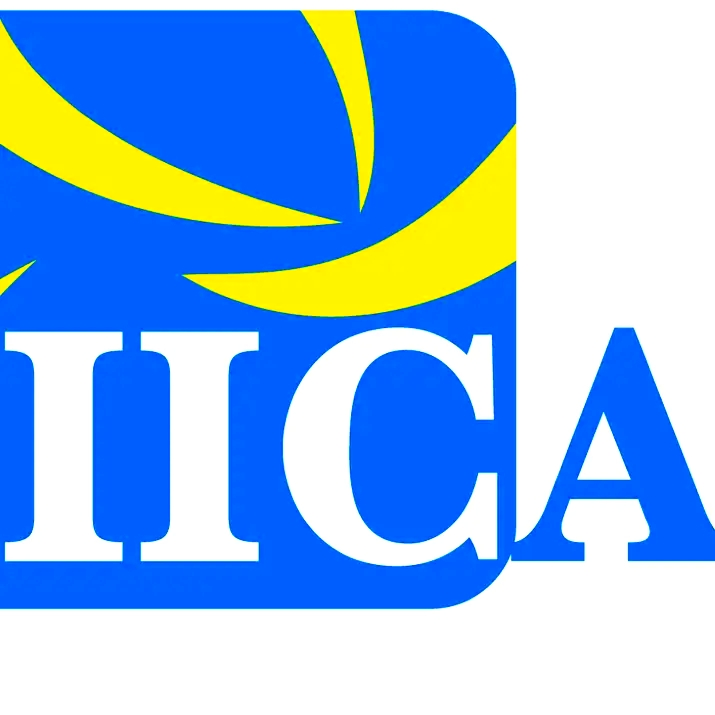
- Partners in Knowledge Governance Transformation

Civil Service training institute overview
- Formed: 2008
- Type: Civil Service Training Institute
- Jurisdiction: Ministry of Corporate Affairs, Government of India
- Headquarters: Manesar District - Gurugram Haryana
- Motto: Partners in Knowledge, Governance, Transformation
- Ministers responsible: Hon'ble, Nirmala Sitharaman, Union Cabinet Minister of Finance and Corporate Affairs; Harsh Malhotra, Minister of State for Corporate Affairs
- Civil Service training institute executive: Ajay Bhushan Pandey,Indian Administrative Service, Director General
- Parent department: Government of India
- Parent Civil Service training institute: Ministry of Corporate Affairs
- Website: iica.nic.in

The Indian Institute of Corporate Affairs (IICA) is a central civil service training institute under the administrative control of Ministry of Corporate Affairs, Government of India for the central civil servants of the Indian Corporate Law Service cadre.

It fulfils various functions in the areas of corporate affairs regulation, governance, and policy. It was established in 2008 at Manesar, Haryana.

It houses the top cadre training academy of the Indian Corporate Law Service. ICLS is an organised Group A service, recruited through the All India Civil Service Examination. ICLS officers are posted across India.

The IICA as per its functional mandate, caters to a distinct user base of working professionals, chartered professionals, practitioners, career executives, corporate KMP(s) etc. for upgrade, enhancement and augmentation of their professional competency and skill base, for which the institute runs various short term courses and some long-term programs on an array of subjects in the spectrum of corporate affairs inter alia Corporate Law, Corporate Governance, Insolvency and Bankruptcy, Independent Directors, Finance and Financial Reporting, CSR (Corporate Social Responsibility), Valuation, ESG (Environmental, Social and Governance), ADR, Business and Human Rights (BHR), Investor Education and Protection, MSME, Competition Law Procurement/ PPP, Market Regulation etc. This means the user base for IICA is limited, being niche and specialized subjects.

IICA works to create opportunities for research, education, training and advocacy.

== History and establishment ==
The Indian Institute of Corporate Affairs (IICA) was established by the Central Government in 2008 as an Institute under the administrative control of Ministry of Corporate Affairs, Government of India to function as a think tank, carry out action research, service delivery and capacity building support to the Central Government, corporate sector, professionals and related stakeholders. The IICA is aimed to support the Government in developing an enabling eco system for corporate through Capacity building - of corporate, public and private; Advocacy initiatives and Consultancy Projects.

Towards this objective, IICA operates through various Schools and Centers, to create opportunities for research, education, training and advocacy on an array of subject in the gamut of Corporate Affairs, primarily being of Corporate Law, Corporate Governance, Insolvency and Bankruptcy, Independent Directors, Finance and Financial Reporting, CSR (Corporate Social Responsibility), Valuation, ESG (Environmental, Social and Governance), ADR Business and Human Rights (BHR), Investor Education and Protection, MSME, Competition Law Procurement/ PPP, Market Regulation, Contract management, Startups etc.

IICA acts as a body of the Government of India to support the research, capacity building and advisory requirements of the corporate sector in India through an integrated and multi-disciplinary approach, bringing Government, Corporates, Regulators and Academic Community together.

The institute is committed to support the corporate sector, both public and private, in upholding the standards of good corporate governance and help grow in a sustainable manner for their enhanced contribution towards nation building.

== Organisation and administration ==
The institute is headed at the executive level by the Director General, who is appointed by The Appointments Committee of the Cabinet (ACC), a high-level committee within the Government of India responsible for appointing senior officials to key positions in the central government and public sector undertakings. The position of Director General in the Indian Institute of Corporate Affairs is of the rank of Secretary to the Government of India. The position holder is generally a career civil servant, usually from the Indian Administrative Service,[7][8][9] and a government official of high seniority. The civil servants who hold this rank and post are either from All India Services or Central Civil Services (Group A; on empanelment).

It has various Schools, Centres, Departments, Academies and Foundations under its ambit looking after different specialized disciplines and areas within the entire gamut of Corporate Affairs horizon.

In December 2021, Govt of India approved the appointment of Praveen Kumar, Retd IAS officer (TN:1987), Former Secretary, Ministry of Skill Development & Entrepreneurship to the post of Director General & Chief Executive Officer (DG & CEO), Indian Institute of Corporate Affairs (IICA). In April 2024, The Appointments Committee of the Cabinet (ACC) approved the entrustment of additional charge of the institute to Dr. Ajay Bhushan Pandey, Chairperson of the National Financial Reporting Authority who is a Retd. IAS officer from 1984 batch of Maharashtra Cadre.

== Areas of work ==
The Indian Institute of Corporate Affairs (IICA) is providing support to the Ministry in the review and revision of existing corporate laws, rules, and regulations, as well as in the development of new ones to meet the needs of a dynamic economic environment. Additionally, IICA is providing training to Indian Company Law Service (ICLS) officers and other Ministry officials and supporting organizational reform initiatives. The institute is also helping to continuously improve service delivery in various areas such as MCA21, corporate governance, corporate social responsibility, investor education and protection, among others.

It works through 5 Schools, 11 Centres and three Research Chair Professors. The Schools are School of Corporate Governance & Public Policy, School of Corporate Law, School of Finance, School of Business Environment and School of Competition Law & Market Regulation. The Centres at IICA are Centre for Independent Director, Centre for Insolvency and Bankruptcy, Centre for Excellence in CSR and Corporate Citizenship, Centre for MSME, Centre for Business and Human Rights, Forum of Indian Regulators Centre, Knowledge Resource Centre and Centre for Institutional Partnership & Corporate Communication. Recently, IICA has opened three more new Centres, viz. Centre of Excellence in Alternative Dispute Resolution, Centre for Regulatory Governance and Centre of Board Excellence and Leadership. The three Research Chair Professors have been sponsored by RBI, IBBI and IEPFA.

The institute aims to provide comprehensive coverage of all disciplines and subjects involved in, or impacting, corporate functioning. The mandates for IICA, as mentioned above, are not exhaustive.

The Indian Corporate Law Service (ICLS) Academy, one of the Wings of IICA, has been mandated for conducting the Induction & Advanced Training for probationary Officers (POs) belonging to the Indian Corporate Law Service recruited through the Common Exam of Civil Services Examination conducted by UPSC.

The IICA, as part of its objectives, is mandated for creation of a pool of cadre professionals on the specialized and emerging topics of Corporate Insolvency, Bankruptcy, Corporate Social Responsibility, Mediation, ADR, Corporate Valuation, Independent Directorship, Environment Social Governance, Business Human Rights, who shall play a pivotal role in India's march to Vikshit Bharat @ 2047 Other Key activities carried out by IICA include capacity-building and training programmes, policy advisory functions, public outreach and stakeholder consultations through seminars, conferences and forums.

IICA plays a crucial role in Supporting corporate(s) in achieving & upholding good corporate governance standards through training of board professionals/KMPS, CSR advisory/evaluation/strategy etc., sensitization and awareness on corporate sector requirements development, impact assessment, capacity building, etc.

== See also ==
- Ministry of Corporate Affairs
- Serious Fraud Investigation Office
- Competition Commission of India
- National Company Law Tribunal
- Registrar of Companies
