= Forensic Accounting and Investigation Standards by ICAI =

Forensic Accounting and Investigation Standards by ICAI are a set of Forensic Accounting and Investigation Standards issued by The Institute of Chartered Accountants of India (ICAI) for preventing the rising issues of accounting, financial and loan irregularities. The standards are designed to be helpful for banks, regulators, corporate entities, and enforcement agencies such as the Economic offense Wing, Enforcement Directorate, Serious Fraud Investigation Office, Central Bureau of Investigation and Reserve Bank of India (RBI) and users of these reports on standardising the activities and to highlight the fundamental principles to be followed by members while auditing and acts as performance benchmarks. The standards lays down the primary qualitative measures for conducting investigations. The full set of FAIS standards drafted for the forensic professionals by The Institute of Chartered Accountants of India (ICAI) with the help of group of professionals and experts is the first in the accounting world.

== Objective ==
Reserve Bank Of India has mandated forensic audits for credit exposure above Rs 200 crores considering that it was challenging for the reports to be admissible in courts of law as there was no standardisation process in such cases. Additionally, with growing issues on accounting, financial and loan irregularities, there is an increasing need to conduct forensic accounting examinations and investigations with professional approach for any evidence discovery to meet the high level of scrutiny which can be proved legally in Court. These standards will guide Forensic Accounting and Investigation Professionals to become experts and contribute in Judicial Proceedings. These standards were classified as

- Standards on Key Concepts, Standards on Engagement Management,
- Standards on the Executing Assignments, Standards on Specialised Areas, and
- Standards on Quality Control.

Based on the report of forensic auditor appointed by banks the latter declares an account as fraud or wilful defaulter and such procedure was missing earlier. The guidelines are being drafted after consulting RBI, Ministry of corporate affairs, the comptroller and auditor general of India, and the Securities and Exchange Board of India. It is planned that Forensic Accounting and Investigation Standards will have 30 standards covering all the aspects.

== List Of Standards ==
Currently around 20 Forensic Accounting and Investigation Standards are issued by Digital Accounting and Assurance Board (DAAB) of ICAI. India is the first country to release these standards.

FAIS No.	Forensic Accounting and Investigation Standard
FAIS 110	Understanding the nature of Engagement
FAIS 120	Understanding the Fraud Risk
FAIS 130	Laws and Regulations
FAIS 140	Applying Hypotheses
FAIS 210	Engagement Objectives
FAIS 220	Engagement Acceptance and Appointment
FAIS 230	Using the work of an Expert
FAIS 240	Engaging with Agencies
FAIS 250	Communication with Stakeholders
FAIS 310	Planning the Assignment
FAIS 320	Evidence and Documentation
FAIS 330	Conducting Work Procedures
FAIS 340	Conducting Interviews
FAIS 350	Review and Supervision
FAIS 360	Reporting Results
FAIS 370	Testifying Before a Competent Authority
FAIS 510	Applying Data Analysis
FAIS 520	Evidence Discovery in Digital Domain
FAIS 530	Loans and Borrowings
FAIS 540	Related And Connected Parties

== Related Articles ==
Forensic accounting
