= Mamta Binani =

Indian lawyer

- Born: 10 October 1972 (age 53); Kolkata
- Citizenship: India
- Occupation: Advocate
- Years active: 2019
- Known for: 2016 : National President of the Institute of Company Secretaries of India

Mamta Binani (born 10 January 1972) is an Indian lawyer. She served as National President of the Institute of Company Secretaries of India (ICSI) for the year 2016, and as senior partner of Mamta Binani & Associates.

== Career ==
She is the first insolvency professional in India to be registered with the Insolvency and Bankruptcy Board of India.

She serves as Independent Director at Balrampur Chini Mills Limited and Emami and as Director at Century Plyboards. She is one of the directors at Rupa & Company Limited

She is the President of the MSME Development Forum - West Bengal Chapter.

Binani is a speaker at various professional forums, where she speaks on contemporary laws, Governance, and corporate social responsibility.

She was elected as the first woman Chairperson of the Eastern India Regional Council of ICSI in 2010 She has represented the Institute of Company Secretaries of India (ICSI) at international forums and is published in journals, magazines, and newspapers.

Her current consulting focuses on new-age legal frameworks, including the Social Stock Exchange and the ESG framework.
