= Registrar of Companies (India) =

Corporate Affairs Office of India

- Emblem of India

Agency overview
- Formed: 1956
- Jurisdiction: Government of India
- Minister responsible: Nirmala Sitharaman, Minister of Corporate Affairs
- Parent agency: Ministry of Corporate Affairs
- Key document: The Companies Act, 2013
- Website: www.mca.gov.in/content/mca/global/en/mca/e-filing/approval-services-roc-rd-hq.html

The Registrar of Companies (ROC) is an office under the Indian Ministry of Corporate Affairs that deals with administration of the Companies Act, 2013, The Limited Liability Partnership Act, 2008, The Cost Accountant Act 1959, The Company Secretaries Act, 1980 and The Chartered Accountants Act, 1949. These officers are from Indian Corporate Law Service cadre. 'ICLS’ is an organised Group A service recruitment of which is done by UPSC through Civil Service Examination since 2009 along with other services like IRS, IAS & IPS etc. There are currently 25 Registrars of Companies (ROC) operating from offices in all major states of India. Some states, such as Maharashtra and Tamil Nadu, have two ROCs each. Also in some places unified ROC offices staffed by senior Group A ICLS officers are located in capital cities like Jammu and Srinagar. Section 609 of the Companies Act, 1956 tasks the ROCs with the primary duty of registering companies and LLPs floated in the respective states and the union territories under their administration.

The ROCs also ensure that LLPs comply with the statutory requirements under the LLP Act. The office of the ROC maintains a registry of records related to companies registered with them, and permits the general public to access this data on payment of a fee. The Union Government maintains administrative control over ROCs through Regional Directors. There are 7 Regional Directors, and they supervise the functioning of ROCs within their respective regions.

The Registrar of Companies takes care of company registration (also known as incorporation) in India, completes reporting and regulation of companies and their directors and shareholders, and also oversees government reporting of various matters including the annual filling of various documents.

== See also ==
- Companies Act, 1956
- Ministry of Corporate Affairs
- Companies Act, 2013
- Companies (1st Amendment) Act, 2015
- List of company registers
