= National Company Law Appellate Tribunal =

Indian tribunal

The National Company Law Appellate Tribunal (NCLAT) is a tribunal which was formed by the Central Government of India under Section 410 of the Companies Act, 2013. The NCLAT was formed as a body with an appellate jurisdiction at the same time when NCLT was established as a major reform as per powers granted to the Ministry of Corporate Affairs in India.

The tribunal is responsible for hearing appeals from the orders of National Company Law Tribunal(s) (NCLT), starting on 1 June 2016.

The tribunal also hears appeals from orders issued by the Insolvency and Bankruptcy Board of India under Section 202 and Section 211 of IBC. It also hears appeals from any direction issued, decision made, or order passed by the Competition Commission of India (CCI) and the National Financial Reporting Authority (NFRA).

On 6 November 2026, Justice Rajesh Bindal has been appointed as the Chairperson of the Appellate Tribunal.

== History and objective ==
National Company Law Appellate Tribunal was formed on 1 June 2016 under The Companies Act 2013. The tribunal was formed as appellate authority to the aggrieved persons against the orders of National Company Law Tribunal which were passed under Section 61 of the Insolvency and Bankruptcy Code, 2016.

The decisions of National Company Law Appellate Tribunal are appealable in the Supreme Court of India. National Company Law Appellate Tribunal has principle bench in Delhi and other one in Chennai.

== Structure of NCLAT ==
The NCLAT includes a Chairperson, 3 judicial members, and 2 technical members. It consists of a total of not more than eleven members. Ashok Bhushan, retired judge of Supreme Court is the current chairman of National Company Law Appellate Tribunal.

Qualifications for Judicial member at National Company Law Appellate Tribunal:

- Should be of 50 years old.
- Served at least 5 years as District Judge or High Court Judge or has a minimum 10 years experience serving in any judicial authority.

Qualifications for Technical member at National Company Law Appellate Tribunal:

- Should be of 50 years old.
- Any person practicing as a Chartered Accountant, Cost Accountant or Company Secretary for a period of 15 years.
- Any person holding the rank of Secretary or Additional Secretary to the central government and is a member of the Indian Corporate Law Service or Indian Legal Service for more than 15 years.

== Powers and functions ==
The following are the powers and functions of the National Company Law Appellate Tribunal.

1. Orders issued by National Company Law Tribunal
2. Orders issued by Competition Commission of India
3. Orders issued by Insolvency and Bankruptcy Board of India
4. Orders issued by National Financial Reporting Authority

== List of present members ==
Following is the list of Hon'ble Chairperson and Sitting Members

Sr.No	Name	Designation	Date of Joining
01	Rajesh Bindal	Chairperson	19-11-2026
02	Sharad Kumar Sharma	Judicial	19-02-2024
03	N. Seshasayee	Judicial	23-05-2025
04	Mohammad Faiz Alam Khan	Judicial	23-05-2025
05	Barun Mitra	Technical	
06	Naresh Salecha	Technical	17-05-2022
07	Ajai Das Mehrotra	Technical	
08	Arun Baroka	Technical	
09	Indevar Pandey	Technical	01-03-2024
10	Jatindranath Swain	Technical	

== List of Chairpersons of NCLAT ==
Justice Rajesh Bindal is the current Chairperson of NCLAT, who took charge on 19 November 2026.
