= National Voluntary Guidelines on Social, Environmental and Economic Responsibilities of Business =

Set of responsible business guidelines

Logo: Responsible Business India

India's National Voluntary Guidelines on Social, Environmental and Economic Responsibilities of Business (NVGs) were released by the Ministry of Corporate Affairs (MCA) in July 2011 by Mr. Murli Deora, the former Honourable Minister for Corporate Affairs. The national framework on Business Responsibility is essentially a set of nine principles that offer businesses an Indian understanding and approach to inculcating responsible business conduct.

“Responsible Business” conduct refers to the commitment of businesses to operating in an economically, socially and environmentally sustainable manner while balancing the demands of shareholders and other interest groups. It's about managing risks and impacts, which affect business’ ability to meet its objectives. The NVGs are formulated with the objective of creating positive framework conditions to advance the role of business in economic growth which is socially and environmentally sustainable, while also ensuring enhanced competitiveness and integration into the global markets.

The NVGs serves as a guidance document for businesses of all size, ownership, sector, and geography to achieve the triple bottom line. In 2012, subsequent to the release of the NVGs the Securities and Exchange Board of India (SEBI), a market regulator, mandated the Annual Business Responsibility Reporting (ABRR), a reporting framework based on the NVGs.

The NVGs are unique, not just in what they represent, which is “an India specific comprehensive understanding of business responsibility”, but also in the way they have been formulated. The “process” was premised on widespread intensive stakeholder consultations to bring out the commonly agreed elements of business responsibility in keeping with India's unique developmental challenges and priorities.

== Drafting process ==
The NVGs are the revised version of the CSR (Corporate Social Responsibility) Voluntary Guidelines 2009, released in December, 2009 by the Honourable President of India, Smt. Pratibha Patil at the India Corporate Week organised by the Ministry of Corporate Affairs (MCA). The CSR Voluntary Guidelines served as a statement of intent by the Government of India to encourage businesses to adopt responsible business practices. The CSR Guidelines provided for review and elaboration which was undertaken by the Indian Institute of Corporate Affairs, a think-tank and capacity development institution set up by the MCA.

The Guidelines Drafting Committee (GDC), appointed by the MCA in 2009, started its work on the new mandate for review and elaboration of the 2009 Guidelines. The process was completed in October 2010 and the final draft was presented to the MCA on 3 November 2010. The revised guidelines were the National Voluntary Guidelines on Social, Environmental and Economic Responsibilities of Business. Stakeholders consulted during the period recommended that since the Guidelines look at a comprehensive framework of responsible business action the title of the Guideline must depict the understanding and hence they were called the NVGs. These were released by the MCA on 8 July 2011.

=== Drafting committee ===
The GDC comprised experts/practitioners from diverse stakeholder groups such as industry associations, regulatory bodies, sector experts, government, financial institutions, etc. It consisted of eleven members who were supported by an anchor team. The drafting process involved extensive consultations, conducted across cities and regions in India: Bangalore (South), New Delhi (North), Kolkata (East) and Mumbai (West). In addition to consultations, written feedback was also solicited. The Indian Institute of Corporate Affairs (IICA), led the entire process. It worked towards developing a consensus on various ideas and perspectives that emerged from various stakeholder groups. The Guidelines were also published on the MCA website for public comments.

The brief before the GDC was to develop these guidelines to provide a distinctively 'Indian' approach on business responsibility (BR), which is also aligned with international norms and frameworks.

== Business responsibility ==
Since the 1990s, liberalisation and deregulation have boosted the development of the private sector making it the forerunner of economic growth. Frenetic expansion and growth of the private sector has also therefore thrown up challenges necessitating proactive action towards making it sustainable and equitable. Encouraged by the Prime Minister's ten Point Charter, the MCA, in the recent past, has sharpened its focus on encouraging businesses to play a proactive role in ensuring sustainable and inclusive growth.

While Indian business traditionally stuck to corporate philanthropy, today business leaders understand that practicing responsible business is of strategic importance to their growth, longevity and competitiveness. The NVGs are an embodiment of an integrated and comprehensive understanding of responsible business. The Guidelines encourage and enable businesses to go beyond compliance and embrace sustainability as part of their business ethos. The nine principles and the corresponding indicators encompass all the elements of what constitutes responsible business conduct. It also delineates the fundamentals of implementing the NVGs.

These are:

1. Leadership: the commitment and role of leadership,
2. Integration: the weaving in of the principles and core elements into the very DNA of the business,
3. Engagement: continuous engagement with relevant stakeholders,
4. Reporting: measuring the impact of business activities on all the nine principles and communicating these to their stakeholders.

== Corporate social responsibility in India ==
Traditionally, Corporate Social Responsibility (CSR) has been widely practiced by Indian corporates - taking the form of philanthropic activities. The new CSR legislation under section 135 of the Companies Act 2013 requires companies of a certain size to spend 2% of their net profit on activities as prescribed under schedule VII, which are primarily aimed at community development. The canvas of CSR remains narrow and de-linked from the core-business activities of a company. However, the more progressive businesses view the legislation as opportunity to address the developmental challenges of India through sustainable innovations and creation of shared value. Principle 8 of the NVGs expounds on this very concept, while also acknowledging the need for community development as articulated under the new CSR law. Principle 8 of the NVGs on “inclusive and equitable growth” focuses on encouraging business action on national development priorities, including community development initiatives and strategic CSR based on the shared value concept.

== Principles on responsible business ==
The NVGs are an aspirational and comprehensive guideline to encourage responsible business behaviour in India. The NVGs, a set of 9 principles, cover a broad array of social, economic, environmental and governance issues and developmental priorities. To actualise the principles a corresponding set of core elements have also been developed. The NVGs also offer guidance on implementation, through its four integral actions – leadership, integration, engagement and reporting. The annexes articulate the business case for adopting the NVGs, existing legislation relevant to the various principles and a set of resources. A special section has been dedicated on the applicability of the principles for Micro, Small and Medium Enterprises (MSMEs), to ensure inclusivity irrespective of scale.

=== The nine principles ===
The NVG Package

Principle 1: Businesses should conduct and govern themselves with ethics, transparency and accountability
Principle 2: Businesses should provide goods and services that are safe and contribute to sustainability throughout their life cycle
Principle 3: Businesses should promote the wellbeing of all employees
Principle 4: Businesses should respect the interests of, and be responsive towards all stakeholders, especially those who are disadvantaged, vulnerable and marginalised
Principle 5: Businesses should respect and promote human rights
Principle 6: Businesses should respect, protect, and make efforts to restore the environment
Principle 7: Businesses, when engaged in influencing public and regulatory policy, should do so in a responsible manner
Principle 8: Businesses should support inclusive growth and equitable development
Principle 9: Businesses should engage with and provide value to their customers and consumers in a responsible manner

== Adopting the guidelines ==
The NVGs help Indian businesses at multiple levels. They enable businesses to create value, encourage healthy labour practices, minimise operational risks, attract and retain customers, motivate investments and financial markets and stimulate growth. Overall, the NVGs enable companies to leave a positive footprint on the environment and society while remaining competitive. The private sector is the economic engine of India. Poverty alleviation, job-creation, innovation at grassroots, protection of scarce resources are not only impacts of sustainable businesses but cater to nation building. With globalisation and a varied range of stakeholders demanding answers, responsible business action is gaining traction.

While the business case was considered to be the biggest motivation for adoption of the guidelines, the guidelines also underscore the importance of ‘values/ethics’ in business conduct as a driver to pursue sustainable management practices as a means to reaching sustainable development goals.

== Annual Business Responsibility Report ==
Following the release of the NVGs, the MCA reconstituted the GDC as the Disclosures Framework Committee with two additional members and tasked it with develop a disclosure framework based on the NVGs. The disclosure framework, 'Annual Business Responsibility Report' (ABRR), was formulated by the Disclosure Framework Committee to ensure wider evidence based uptake of the NVGs. The ABRR is a reporting format that requires principle-wise (NVGs) disclosure by businesses. This reporting framework helps Indian companies implement the NVGs and communicate the same to its stakeholders. It is designed on an ‘Apply or Explain’ methodology and aims at assisting companies to re-examine their processes and align them with the ethos of the NVGs.

The ‘Apply-or-Explain’ principle is an enabling measure that encourages companies to do three things:

1. Disclose the current status of sustainability driven performance at whatever stage that may be.
2. Disclose reasons for non-adoption of any of the principles, which may include non-applicability as per their understanding, or future plans of implementation.
3. Ideally undertake a process of review to identify and manage sustainability gaps and risks in line with the future outlook of the company.

The ABRR reports can be accessed on the website of the National Stock Exchange and the Bombay Stock Exchange. The 100 companies that report are currently the top listed companies based on market capitalization at BSE and NSE. 98 companies have filed their Business Responsibility Reports (BRRs) on the websites of the National and Bombay Stock Exchanges. A linkage document was also developed and launched internationally at the GRI (Global Reporting Initiative) Conference on Sustainability in Amsterdam 2013. The document serves as a tool for businesses to map their performance against the NVGs, ABRR and GRI G3 guidelines.

== Securities and Exchange Board Of India directive ==
The Guidelines were released by the Ministry of Corporate Affairs, Government of India on 8 July 2011. Soon after, on 24 November 2011, a Board resolution was passed by the Securities and Exchange Board of India (SEBI), wherein they mandated the top 100 listed companies to report on their Environmental, Social and Governance (ESG) performance through a Business Responsibility Report (BRR), which would then form a part of their annual report/filings. The BRR is envisioned as an annual document describing the measures taken by companies against the nine principles of the NVGs. The SEBI directive took effect at the start of the fiscal year 2013/2014 for the top 100 companies. Companies falling under the purview of the mandate have filed their BR reports along with the Annual Reports in the financial year 2013/14 which is available as public knowledge on National and Bombay Stock exchange websites. (See also: Sustainability Reporting)

== Future plans ==
SEBI encourages all companies to adopt the ABRR. With NVGs now in place, development of sector-specific guidelines on BRR is underway. The IICA in 2014-2015 will offer training of trainer modules on the NVGs and the BRR for multiplier institutions such as academia, industrial associations and other intermediary organisations.

== See also ==
- Climate Change
- Corporate Citizenship
- Corporate Social Responsibility
- Ministry of Corporate Affairs
- Securities and Exchange Board of India
- Sustainability
- Sustainability Reporting
