= Nidhi company =

Type of finance company in India

A nidhi company is a type of company in the Indian non-banking finance sector, recognized under section 406 of the Companies Act, 2013. Their core business is borrowing and lending money between their members. They are also known as Permanent Fund, Benefit Funds, Quasi Bank, Mutual Benefit Funds and Mutual Benefit Company. They are regulated by Ministry of Corporate Affairs, which is also empowered to issue directions to them in matters relating to their deposit acceptance activities. However, in recognition of the fact that these companies deal with their shareholder-members only. Nidhi means a company which has been incorporated with the object of developing the habit of thrift and reserve funds amongst its members and also receiving deposits and lending to its members only for their mutual benefit.

Nidhi companies existed even prior to the existence of companies Act 2013. The basic concept of nidhi is "Principle of Mutuality" These companies are more popular in South India, and 80% of Nidhi companies are located in Tamil Nadu.

== Governing law ==
Nidhi companies are governed by Nidhi Rules, 2014. They are incorporated in the nature of Public Limited company and hence, they have to comply with two set of norms, one of Public limited company as per Companies Act, 2013 and another is for Nidhi rules, 2014. No RBI approval is necessary to register the company, as RBI has specifically exempted this category of NBFC in India to comply its core provisions such as registration with RBI etc. Every Nidhi Company must ensure within a period of one year from the commencement that it has not less than 200 members.

== Process of registration ==
The Ministry of Corporate Affairs vides its notification dated 18 February 2020 effective from 23rd February 2020 has further amended the Companies (Incorporation) Rules, 2014 thereby substituting the old form INC-32 (SPICe) with web service SPICe+ along with certain other amendments.

1. An Application of Name Registration
2. Fill Part B of SPICe+, MOA, AOA and AGILe Form
3. Convert SPICe+ Form into PDF
4. Upload the Form on Ministry of Corporate Affairs

== Registration ==
Nidhi company registration is simple and less complex as compared to other types of finance companies like NBFC which require RBI license to start. A nidhi company can be started with an initial capital of Rs.10 lakh and requires at least seven people to start with (minimum 7 members). Nidhi company registration also requires three directors initially. Every promoter or director needs a copy of PAN card, ID proof and address proof to apply for a nidhi company in India.
