= Karma News =

Indian Malayalam language news portal

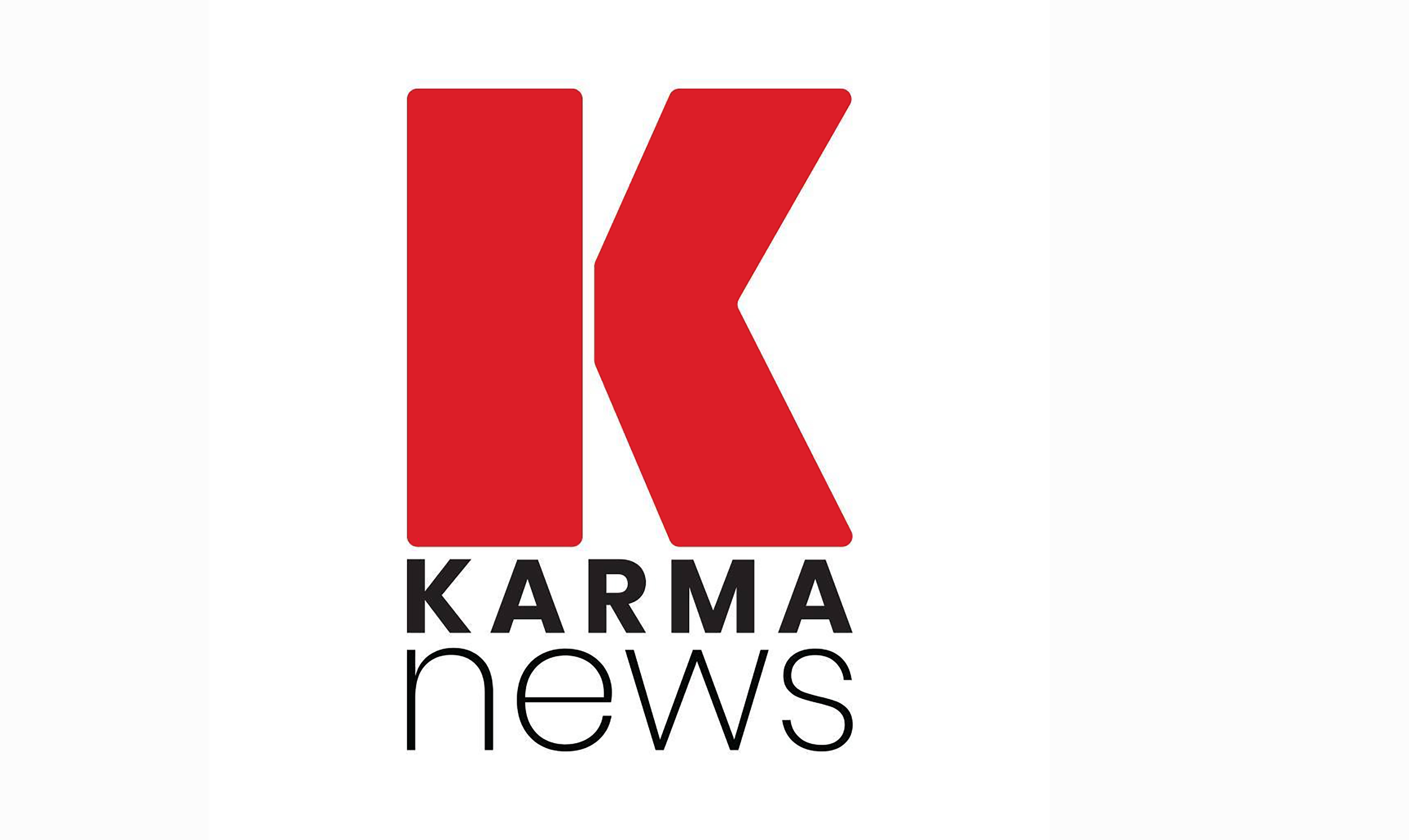
- Available in: Malayalam
- Headquarters: Thiruvananthapuram, {{{location_country}}}
- Owner: The Karma Media Pvt Ltd
- Website: www.thekarmanews.com
- Launched: March 2014

The Karma News is an Indian digital news platform based in Kerala. It was founded by Vince Mathew in 2014. Apart from Kerala, it also has bureaus in the states of Tamil Nadu and Karnataka. It operates under the aegis of The Karma Media Private Limited, an Indian company registered under the Companies Act 2013.

== History ==
Karma News, being a new media digital platform primarily publishes its news stories on its website with majority of coverage in the Malayalam language. The platform additionally has an English language edition of the website as well. The news coverage is divided into factual news reporting and opinion pieces.

In 2021, Karma News partnered with Malayalam's first music narrated short film, Janmam Saphalamayi. Produced by Reji Parakkan, the film is based on a romantic song written by Malayalam poet Girish Puthenchery two decades ago.
