= Companies (2nd Amendment) Act 2017 =

Indian parliamentary act for companies

The Companies (Amendment) Act of 2017 is a law in India that modifies the Companies Act, 2013, realigning sections to improve corporate governance and convenience of doing business in India while maintaining compliance and investor protection.

The introduction of the Companies Act, 2013, which replaced the previous Companies Act, 1956, was one of the most important legal reforms in recent years (1956 Act). Though the 2013 act was a start in the right way by introducing important improvements in areas like disclosures, investor protection, corporate governance, and so on, there were several instances of conflict and overreach within the legislation that made implementation challenges. In reality, more than 100 revisions to the 2013 Act have been made since its enactment.

As a result, in June 2015, the Companies Law Committee (CLC) was formed to present suggestions to remedy concerns resulting from the implementation of the 2013 Act. Based on the recommendations in the CLC report, the government tabled the Companies (Amendment) Bill, 2016 (Bill) in the Lok Sabha on March 16, 2016, which was passed by the Lok Sabha on July 27, 2017, and by the Rajya Sabha on December 19, 2017.

== History ==
The Companies (Amendment) Act, 2017, which was passed by the Lok Sabha on July 27, 2017, and the Rajya Sabha on December 19, 2017, gained the President of India assent on January 3, 2018, and was then published in the Indian Gazette.

The amending Act had taken effect on the date set by the Central Government in a notification published in the Official Gazette, with separate dates set for different parts of the Act.

The Amendment Act, which proposes a raft of amendments, aimed to realign various rules to make corporate governance and conducting business in India easier while maintaining compliance and investor protection.

== Key Changes ==
- Expansion of the term 'related party': The Amendment Act expands the definition of a related party to include "an investment company or enterprise of a company". This means that any company that receives investment from a corporate body will become an associate of that body corporate.
- Definition of a subsidiary company: The subsidiary will be determined on the basis of total voting power and not on the basis of total share capital. The holding company must control the composition of the board of directors or control more than half of the total voting power in the subsidiary.
- Rationalisation of penalties: One of the most acclaimed amendments made in the Amendment Act – the quantum of penalty will now be levied keeping in view the size of the company, nature of business, injury to public interest, nature and severity of default, repetition of default, etc.
- Management compensation: The Amendment Act eliminates the requirement for top management to obtain government approval for remuneration (exceeding 11 percent of profits). Instead, the matter must now be resolved by the company & shareholders.
