= UGRO Capital =

Indian non-banking financial company

UGRO Capital Limited
- Company type: Public
- Traded as: BSE: 511742; NSE: UGROCAP
- ISIN: INE583D07455
- Industry: Financial services
- Founded: 2018
- Founder: Shachindra Nath
- Headquarters: Mumbai, Maharashtra, India
- Key people: Shachindra Nath (Vice chairman and managing director); Anuj Pandey (CEO)
- Revenue: ₹1,441.85 crore (FY2025)
- Website: www.ugrocapital.com

U GRO Capital (formerly known as Chokhani Securities) is an Indian financial services company which provides customized loan solutions to MSMEs in India. Its headquartered in Mumbai, India.

UGRO Capital is a listed company in National Stock Exchange (NSE: UGROCAP) and Bombay Stock Exchange (BSE: 511742). The company's shares are traded under the symbol UGROCAP.

The company's AUM and Net Worth as on Mar-25 was INR 1441 Cr.

== History ==
UGRO Capital was formed in 2018 following the acquisition and restructuring of the publicly listed non-banking financial company Chokhani Securities Limited by Shachindra Nath through Poshika Advisory. After the change in control, the company was rebranded as UGRO Capital and shifted its business focus toward financing micro, small, and medium enterprise (MSMEs).

Between 2022 and 2024, UGRO Capital expanded its operations through a combination of additional capital-raising and acquisitions. In November 2021, the company entered a co-lending agreement with the State Bank of India to finance MSMEs under Reserve Bank of India guidelines. During the 2022–2023 period, UGRO Capital raised additional capital, including ₹340.5 crore, and secured funding of ₹240 crore from the Danish SDG Investment Fund. In 2024, the company acquired the fintech platform MyShubhLife, which became a wholly owned subsidiary, marking its entry into embedded credit delivery. During the same year, UGRO Capital issued equity shares to institutional investors through a preferential allotment, including investment from the Danish SDG Investment Fund. The company also raised approximately ₹1,265 crore through the issuance of compulsory convertible debentures and warrants, with participation from Samena Capital and other institutional investors. In May 2024, the board approved a proposal to raise additional equity capital of ₹1,332.66 crore.

In 2025, UGRO Capital announced an agreement to acquire Profectus Capital, subject to regulatory approvals. The transaction received approval from the Reserve Bank of India later that year. In January 2026, the board approved a scheme to amalgamate Profectus Capital, then a wholly owned subsidiary, with UGRO Capital, subject to approval by the National Company Law Tribunal and other authorities.

== Awards ==
- Global SME Finance Awards 2022, Financer of the Year for Asia (Silver) in Cambodia
