= Company Secretary (India) =

Professional title

A Company Secretary in India is a qualified member of the Institute of Company Secretaries of India (ICSI). Prerequisites for membership are successful completions of the ICSI theory and practical training exams. Company Secretaries are required for every Indian Company listing on the stock exchange, public or private, with share capitals of Rs 10 crores or higher. As a qualified professional, a company secretary is required to perform the duties enumerated by the ICSI for organisations engaged in manufacturing or service for ensuring proper compliance with legal and taxation-related controls to be followed through the course of its operations. These policies clear any ambiguities for the organisations in the maintenance of their book of accounts. The ICSI has +70000 Company Secretaries. Their roles include facilitating meetings of the Board of Directors, providing guidance on formation, mergers and liquidations and representing the company in arbitration or the Company Law Board, among other tasks.

== History and objective ==
A Company Secretary is an individual who has qualified for the examinations and completed the required practical and theoretical sessions conducted by the Institute of Company Secretaries of India (ICSI), a body of registered Company Secretaries founded in 1980. Every Indian company, public or private, with paid share capitals of at least Rs 10 crore or greater and listed on the stock market needs a full-time company secretary who handles legal obligations related to the company.

== Eligibility criteria ==
The following criteria are the required educational qualifications for the three levels:

=== Company Secretary Executive Entrance Test ===
- An aspirant can enroll for Company Secretary Executive Entrance Test after completion of 12th class from a recognized Board or Institution.

=== Executive Level ===
An aspirant can enroll for Executive Level of Company Secretary after passing a foundation conducted by the Institute of Company Secretaries of India. He or she must be an undergraduate in any field of specialization from a recognized Institution or university with 50 percent or above. Otherwise, an undergraduate in any field of specialization from a recognized Institution or university with 50 percent or less should get qualified in Company Secretary Executive Entrance Test (CSEET). He or she must be a postgraduate in any field of specialization from a recognized Institution or university. The minimum age is 17 years.

=== Professional Level ===
- On this level, an aspirant must have successful completion of foundation and executive levels.

== Responsibilities ==
A full time Company Secretary in India is needed for a company with a capital of 10 crores or more to perform the following activities:

- Planning and facilitating Board of Director meetings.
- Acting as Registrar for a Company.
- Guiding the formation of new companies, mergers of companies, and liquidations of companies.
- Administration-related tasks as Chief Administration officer.
- Making policies for Company in accordance with Capital Markets.
- Managing secretarial assignments as principal secretary.
- Adhering to tax regulations as Administrative Secretary.
- Adhering to regulations on various legal issues.
- Reviewing guidelines on accountancy and audit as Corporate Planner.
- Scheduling internal and external appointments as Administrative Assistant.
- Representing the Company in Registrar of Companies.
- Representing the Company in issues related to arbitration.

== Curriculum ==
Following are the curriculum and eligibility for clearance of each of the stages:

=== Company Secretary Executive Entrance Test ===
This includes four subjects, known as Papers, of 100 marks each as under:

- Paper 1: Business Communication (Subjective, three hours)
- Paper 2: Fundamentals of Accounting (Subjective, three hours)
- Paper 3: Economic and Business Environment (Subjective, three hours)
- Paper 4: Business Laws and Management (OMR Based, two hours)

==== Qualifying Marks ====
Examination for Company Secretary Executive Entrance Test is conducted three times a year (February, June, & October).

=== Company Secretary Executive Examination ===
The Intermediate Exam consists of two groups with seven Subjects, carrying 100 marks each with a prescribed time limit of three hours during the exam:

- Paper 1: Jurisprudence. Interpretation & General Laws.
- Paper 2: Company Law & Practice.
- Paper 3: Setting Up Of Business, Industrial & Labour Laws.
- Paper 4: Corporate Accounting & Financial Management.
- Paper 5: Capital Marketing & Securities Laws.
- Paper 6: Economic, Commercial & Intellectual Property Laws.
- Paper 7: Tax Laws & Practice.

==== Marks needed to Qualify ====
An aspirant needs to get 40% minimum in each subject and an aggregate of 50% in all subjects to qualify for the intermediate examination. If a candidate appears for examination for both groups and is able to secure minimum qualified marks in all subjects in either group or both groups but fails to get an aggregate in any group, then the same can be set off from the excess marks from other groups. However, if the marks do not meet the aggregate criteria in the required group, the person testing fails the group and cannot secure the necessary aggregate score and may need to be retested.

=== Company Secretary Professional Examination ===
The Final exam in Company Secretary has eight papers of 100 marks each, which are divided into four subjects in two groups. The exam duration for each subject is three hours.

- Paper 1: Environmental, Social and Governance Principles and Practices.
- Paper 2: Drafting, Pleadings and Appearances.
- Paper 3: Compliance Management, Audit and Due Diligence.
- Paper 4: Open Book Exam (elective paper).
- Paper 5: Corporate Restructuring, Insolvency and Valuation.
- Paper 6: Corporate Funding and Strategic Management
- Paper 7: Open Book Exam (elective paper)

=== Qualifying Marks ===
A candidate can either opt to attempt for one or both groups in an examination, however, they can aim for All India Rank in the examination, only if they attend and clear both groups at a time and is able to secure marks within the top 50 candidates attending.

An aspirant needs to get 40% minimum in each subject and an aggregate of 50 percent in all subjects to qualify in the final examination. If a candidate appears for examination for both groups and if they are able to secure minimum qualified marks in all subjects in either groups or both groups but fails to get aggregate in any group, then the same can be set off from the excess marks from other group. However, if the marks are unable to meet the aggregate criteria in the required group, then they have failed the group and is unable to secure the aggregate until they are retested

== Mandatory training ==
A Company Secretary needs to complete these mandatory trainings during the training period when Rs 10,000 per month stipend is given:

- Training in Computers
- Induction programme for Students
- Programme on Executive Development
- Specialised agency training
- Development Programme for Professionals
- Orientation programme for management-related subjects
- Respective Internships with collaborated entities (Three years after post Executive Level Registration, or post clearance of Executive exam for two years or post clearance of professional exam for one year)

For getting a membership in the Institute of Company Secretaries of India, an aspirant must attend the Corporate Leadership Development Programme after the completion of three levels.

== Examination and fee structure ==
The examinations prepared by the ISCI at Executive and Professional levels are conducted two times in a year; in June and December. For the fee structure its details for various levels are:

1. Company Secretary Executive - Rs 8,800 (Registration - Rs 1,500, Tuition Fee - Rs 5,000, Examination form fee - Rs 1,800, Examination Fee - Rs 500).
2. Company Secretary Professional - Rs 13,250 (Registration - Rs 1,500, Tuition Fee - Rs 9,500, Examination form fee - Rs 2,250).

== Recognition ==
Company Secretaries are eligible for Ph.D courses in universities based in India, National Eligibility Test (NET) conducted by the University Grants Commission (UGC). The award of Fellowship in Junior Research or Assistant Professor as the degree holders of Company Secretary (CS) course are considered equivalent to Post Graduates by the UGC.

== See also ==
- Institute of Company Secretaries of India
