= Serious Fraud Office =

The Serious Fraud Office may refer to:

- Serious Fraud Office (United Kingdom)
- Serious Fraud Office (New Zealand)
- Serious Fraud Investigation Office, India
