= Companies (Amendment) Act, 2015 =

The Companies (Amendment) Act, 2015, of India, was granted the assent of the President on May 25, 2015, but was published in the Official Gazette on May 26, 2015. This Amendment aims to swiftly bridge some of the most pressing concerns of stakeholders such as the need to align business exigencies with certain actions deemed punishable with criminal law under the original Act of 1956 but not yet amended in the new Companies Act of 2013.

The amended provisions of the new Act have done away with the requirement of minimum capital to establish a company. Under the original Act, every company required certain amounts of paid-up capital; a private company needed ₹100,000 (1 lakh) and a public company required ₹500,000 (5 lakh) as minimum paid-up capital to apply for incorporation. However, the Amendment of 2015 abolished these limits in order to increase India's ease of doing business rankings. The Amendment of 2015 also permitted substitution of company seals with Director signatures to sign company documents.

== History ==
Prior to being passed as an Act, the Companies (Amendment) Act was passed in the Lok Sabha as the Companies (Amendment) Bill on December 17, 2014. Later, specific provisions were revised on the recommendations of the Ministry of Corporate Affairs.

== Key Changes Introduced by the Companies (Amendment) Act, 2015 ==
- Removal of minimum paid-up share capital [Section 2(68) and Section 2(71)]: The private and public companies can now be set up without having to arrange for any minimum capital.
- Making common seal optional [Section 9, 12, 22, 46 and 223]: The Amendment Act dispenses the mandatory requirement for every company to have a common seal on documents, authorization papers, agreements, etc.
- Declaration of commencement of business [Omission of Section 11]: Director of a company no longer requires filing a verified declaration with the Registrar of Companies that each subscriber had paid the requisite value of the shares agreed and that the minimum paid-up share capital requirement had been satisfied.
- Punishment for acceptance of deposits: Section 76A has been introduced by the Amendment Act as the penalty provision for non-compliance with Section 73. The proposed penalty is: (a) The payment of the deposit amount and the interest due by the company along with payment of a fine which shall not be less than one crore rupees and which may extend up to ten crore rupees. (b) Every officer in default shall be punishable with imprisonment which may extend to seven years or a fine extending to two crore rupees or both.
- Obtaining copies of board resolutions: No person shall have the right to inspect or obtain copies of resolutions passed by the board of a company relating to matters prescribed under Section 179(3).
- Declaration of dividend: An additional proviso to Section 123 of the Act has been added which states that the dividends cannot be declared unless all losses are fully written off against the profits.
- Transfer of unclaimed dividends and shares: Section 124(6) clarifies that dividends unpaid or unclaimed for a period of seven consecutive years shall be transferred by the company to the Investor Education and Protection Fund along with their respective shares.
- Reporting of fraud under Section 134(3) and 143 (12): Only the offences involving amounts exceeding the prescribed threshold must be reported to the Central Government. All offences involving fraud below the aforementioned threshold must be reported to the Audit Committee.
- Loans to Directors: Under Section 185, loans or guarantees/securities given to wholly owned subsidiaries and guarantees/securities on loans taken from banks by subsidiaries have been exempted from complying with the requirements.
- Related party transactions [Section 188]: The necessity of passing the special resolution for endorsing specific related party transactions have been discarded. No resolutions need to be passed if the accounts of holding and subsidiary companies are consolidated and placed before the shareholders in a meeting for approval.
- Offences under the jurisdiction of Special Courts: Section 435 now mandates that Special Courts shall only try offences which provide for imprisonment of at least two years. This modification empowers magistrate courts to try company personnel for minor violations.
- Modifications in the power of Parliament to exempt Companies from the provisions of the Companies Act, 2013: The period of 30 days needed to place the case for exemption in front of either house of Parliament will no longer cover periods when either house is not in session for 4 consecutive days or more.

== Impact ==
This Amendment was one of the first steps toward easing restrictions and decriminalising regulations for companies and businesses in general. However, private placement processes for closely related companies, granting specific exemptions for insider trading to private companies, granting of stock options to promoters in the instance of a private limited company, etc., remain in contention and are still being addressed.
