= Insolvency and Bankruptcy Code, 2016 =

Act of the Parliament of India

Parliament of India
- Long title: An Act to consolidate and amend the laws relating to reorganisation and insolvency resolution of corporate persons, partnership firms and individuals in a time bound manner for maximisation of value of assets of such persons, to promote entrepreneurship, availability of credit and balance the interests of all the stakeholders including alteration in the order of priority of payment of Government dues and to establish an Insolvency and Bankruptcy Board of India, and for matters connected therewith or incidental thereto.
- Citation: Act No. 31 of 2016
- Territorial extent: India
- Passed by: Lok Sabha
- Passed: 5 May 2016
- Passed by: Rajya Sabha
- Passed: 11 May 2016
- Assented to: 28 May 2016
- Commenced: 28 May 2016

Legislative history

Initiating chamber: Lok Sabha
- Bill title: The Insolvency and Bankruptcy Code, 2016
- Bill citation: Bill No. 349 of 2015
- Introduced by: Arun Jaitley
- Introduced: 21 December 2015
- Committee report: Report of the Joint Committee

Final stages
- Reported from conference committee: 28 April 2016
- Status: In force

The Insolvency and Bankruptcy Code, 2016 (IBC) is an Indian law which creates a consolidated framework that governs insolvency and bankruptcy proceedings for companies, partnership firms, and individuals.

== Background ==
Prior to the IBC, the legislative framework for insolvency and restructuring was fragmented across multiple legislations, such as the Companies Act 2013, the Sick Industrial Companies (Special Provisions) Act, 1985, Securitization and Reconstruction of Financial Assets and Enforcement of Security Interest Act, 2002, the Recovery of Debts due to Banks and Financial Institutions Act (RDDBFI Act), 1993, and others.

== History ==
On 22 August 2014, the Ministry of Finance created the Bankruptcy Legislative Reforms Committee (BLRC). The committee was headed by T. K. Viswanathan, and tasked with drafting a new bankruptcy law. The Committee submitted its report, which included a draft bill, on 4 November 2015. A modified version of the draft bill, after the incorporation of public comments, was introduced in the Sixteenth Lok Sabha by Finance Minister Arun Jaitley as the Insolvency and Bankruptcy Code, 2015. The bill was tabled on 23 December 2015. A Joint Parliamentary Committee on the Insolvency and Bankruptcy Code, 2015 (JPC) was set up and the bill was referred to it for detailed analysis. The JPC submitted its report, which included a new draft of the Bill, 28 April 2016. It was passed by the Lok Sabha on 5 May 2016, and by the Rajya Sabha on 11 May 2016. Subsequently, it received assent from President Pranab Mukherjee and was notified in The Gazette of India on 28 May 2016.

== Early cases ==
The first insolvency resolution order under this code was passed by National Company Law Tribunal (NCLT) in the case of Synergies-Dooray Automotive Ltd. in CP(IB)No. 01/HDB/2017 on 14 August 2017, reported in [2017] ibclaw.in 23 NCLT. The plea for insolvency was submitted by company on 23 January 2017. The resolution plan was submitted to NCLT within a period of 180 days as required by the code, and the approval for the same was received on 2 August 2017 from the tribunal. The final order was uploaded on 14 August 2017 on the NCLT website.

The First case under Indian Insolvency law before Supreme Court was in Innoventive Industries Ltd. v. ICICI Bank and Anr.

== Key Provisions ==
Insolvency Resolution : The Code outlines separate insolvency resolution processes for individuals, companies and partnership firms. The process may be initiated by either the debtor or the creditors. A maximum time limit, for completion of the insolvency resolution process, has been set for corporates and individuals. For companies, the process will have to be completed in 180 days, which may be extended by 90 days, if a majority of the creditors agree. For start ups (other than partnership firms), small companies and other companies (with asset less than Rs. 1 crore), resolution process would be completed within 90 days of initiation of request which may be extended by 45 days.

The Insolvency and Bankruptcy Code (Amendment) Act, 2019 has increased the mandatory upper Time limit of 330 days including time spent in legal process to complete resolution process.

Insolvency regulator: The Code establishes the Insolvency and Bankruptcy Board of India, to oversee the insolvency proceedings in the country and regulate the entities registered under it. The Board will have 10 members, including representatives from the Ministries of Finance and Law, and the Reserve Bank of India.

Insolvency professionals: The insolvency process will be managed by licensed professionals. These professionals will also control the assets of the debtor during the insolvency process.

Bankruptcy and Insolvency Adjudicator: The Code proposes two separate tribunals to oversee the process of insolvency resolution, for individuals and companies: (i) the National Company Law Tribunal for Companies and Limited Liability Partnership firms; and (ii) the Debt Recovery Tribunal for individuals and partnerships.

== Procedure ==
=== Time Limit ===
The IBC envisions that the entire Corporate Insolvency Resolution Process (CIRP) must take place within 180 days of the admission of the application. A CIRP must be mandatorily completed within 330 days, including any extension or litigation period.

The Hon'ble Supreme Court in Committee of Creditors of Essar Steel India Ltd. v. Satish Kumar Gupta & Ors., reported at (2019) ibclaw.in 07 SC, has struck down the upper limit of 330 days holding that it may be open in some cases for the Adjudicating Authority and/or Appellate Tribunal to extend time beyond 330 days.

=== Initiating the CIRP ===
In the case of a corporate debtor, an application for insolvency proceedings must be submitted to the Adjudicating Authority (AA), which is the NCLT. The application may be filed by a financial creditor (Section 7), an operational creditor (Section 9), or the corporate debtor (Section 10) itself. Section 11 enumerates the persons not entitled to make an application, such as corporate debtor who was in a CIRP at the time of the application, or had been in one recently.

The maximum time allowed to consider the application is 14 days. If the application is allowed, the Adjudicating Authority: (i) declares a moratorium; (ii) causes a public announcement of the CIRP process and calls for the submission of claims; and (iii) appoints an Interim Resolution Professional (IRP).

=== Moratorium ===
On the date on which the insolvency commences, a moratorium is declared, and it remains in force until the end of the CIRP. The CIRP ends, either when the AA approves a resolution plan under Section 31(1), or when it passes a liquidation order under Section 33. The moratorium ensures that the CIRP has a free-rein and is the only mechanism through which claims are settled. It bars the institution of litigation against the corporate debtor, while at the same time suspending the corporate debtor's ability to move, sell, or transfer any of its assets. It bars actions both by and against the corporate debtor. However, the moratorium has certain exceptions, such as Section 14(2A), which allows the IRP to continue to supply of such goods and services as it considers necessary to preserve the value of the corporate debtor.

For the said period, the board of directors of the company stands suspended, and the promoters do not have a say in the management of the company. The IRP, if required, can seek the support of the company's management for day-to-day operations. If the CIRP fails in reviving the company, the liquidation process is initiated.

== Amendments ==
- 2017 Amendment prohibits certain persons from submitting a resolution plan in case of defaults. These include: (i) wilful defaulters, (ii) promoters or management of the company if it has an outstanding non-performing debt for over a year, and (iii) disqualified directors, among others. Further, it bars the sale of property of a defaulter to such persons during liquidation.

== High-value cases ==
Company	Debt	Date of referral to NCLT	Date of Resolution	Recovery Amount	Notes	Reference
Essar Steel	₹490 billion (US$5.1 billion)	June 2017	Dec 2019	₹42,000 crore (equivalent to ₹570 billion or US$5.9 billion in 2026)	SC delivered its final verdict and cleared way for Arcelor Mittal India and Nippon Steel Japan to form a joint venture to complete the takeover by end of Dec 2019.	
Bhushan Steel	₹440 billion (US$4.6 billion)	26 July 2017	May 2018	₹36,400 crore (equivalent to ₹530 billion or US$5.5 billion in 2026)	Tata Steel, through its wholly owned subsidiary Bamnipal Steel Ltd (BNPL), has acquired 72.65 per cent controlling stake in Bhushan Steel Ltd (BSL) for around Rs 36,400 crore. The company was selected as the highest bidder in March 2018 to buy a controlling stake in Bhushan Steel, as part of bankruptcy proceedings.	
Bhushan Power & Steel	₹492 billion (US$5.1 billion)	June 2017	March 2021	₹19,350 crore (equivalent to ₹240 billion or US$2.5 billion in 2026)	After four years of litigation involving ED & previous owners, CoC has voted in favor of JSW Steel. The deal will be completed by end of March 2021.	
Alok Industries	₹290 billion (US$3.0 billion)	June 2017	March 2019	₹5,050 crore (equivalent to ₹68 billion or US$710 million in 2026)	Joint bid by Reliance Industries Limited (RIL) and JM Financial Asset Reconstruction Co was approved by NCLT Ahmedabad last year.	
Jet Airways	₹146 billion (equivalent to ₹200 billion or US$2.1 billion in 2026)	June 2019			CoC has accepted a ₹1,000-crore bid by a consortium of UK-based Kalrock Capital and UAE-based entrepreneur Murari Lal Jalan on Oct 17, 2020.	
Reliance Communications	₹33,000 crore (equivalent to ₹450 billion or US$4.6 billion in 2026)	June 2019	Jan 2020	₹23,000 crore (equivalent to ₹300 billion or US$3.1 billion in 2026)	Reliance Jio will get the tower and fiber assets of Reliance Infratel Ltd for Rs 4,700 crore, UV Asset Reconstruction Co Ltd (UVARC) will get assets of RCom and Reliance Telecom (spectrum) for Rs 14,000 crore.	
Dewan Housing Finance Ltd	₹1,000 billion (equivalent to ₹1.4 trillion or US$14 billion in 2026)	Nov 29, 2019	Jan 2021	₹38,000 crore (equivalent to ₹470 billion or US$4.8 billion in 2026)	First financial company to be referred to NCLT under IBC by RBI. It was acquired by Piramal Group, and, according to the resolution plan, Piramal Capital and Housing Finance Ltd. (PCHFL) will merge with DHFL.	
Reliance Capital		6 December 2021			RBI superseded the board on Nov 29, 2021 with the intention of starting insolvency proceedings. The central bank appointed Nageswara Rao Y., a former executive director of Bank of Maharashtra, as the company's administrator.; The Committee of Creditors (COC) has decided to reject all the binding bids. The COC is now considering sending Reliance Capital to liquidation, under the newly introduced regulation 6(A) of the IBC, whereby each individual business can be sold separately.	
Future Retail		Pending Admission to NCLT			Lenders have picked a Resolution Professional and are preparing to get the company admitted NCLT proceedings after the company defaulted on Rs 3,495 crore of loans in January as per the terms of a one-time restructuring deal.	
