= Serious Fraud Investigation Office =

Indian law enforcement agency

- Logo of SFIO
- Common name: Serious Fraud Investigation Office
- Abbreviation: SFIO

Agency overview
- Formed: 2003

Jurisdictional structure
- Federal agency: India
- Operations jurisdiction: India
- Governing body: Government of India
- General nature: Federal law enforcement

Operational structure
- Headquarters: New Delhi, India
- Agency executive: Samir Ashwin Vakil, Director up to 17 December 2022
- Parent agency: Ministry of Corporate Affairs
- Regions: 4: Hyderabad; Kolkata; Mumbai; Chennai

Facilities
- Regional Offices: 5

Website
- sfio.nic.in

The Serious Fraud Investigation Office (SFIO) is a statutory agency in India tasked with investigating corporate fraud. It operates under the Ministry of Corporate Affairs, Government of India, with the mandate of detecting and prosecuting or recommending prosecution for white-collar crimes. The SFIO is a multi-disciplinary organization, comprising experts in various fields such as accountancy, forensic auditing, banking, law, information technology, investigation, company law, capital market, taxation, among other domains.

Initially, it was set up by a resolution adopted by the Government of India on 2 July 2003 and carried out investigations within the existing legal framework under section 235 to 247 of the erstwhile Companies Act, 1956. Later, Section 211 of the Companies Act, 2013, accorded the statutory status to SFIO.

== History ==
Based on the recommendation of Naresh Chandra Committee on corporate governance (which was set up by the Government on 21 August 2002) and in the backdrop of stock market scams as also the failure of non-banking companies resulting in huge financial loss to the public, Vajpayee Government decided to set up SFIO on 9 January 2003.

== Organisation structure ==
Agency headquarters is in the Indian capital, New Delhi, with field offices located in major cities throughout India. The SFIO draws most of its officers from the ICLS, IAS, IPS, IRS and banks & other central services. The current SFIO director is Keshav Chandra (IAS). Many Additional, Joint and deputy director level officers are from ministry 's parent cadre, Indian Corporate Law Service.

The agency has four regional offices in Hyderabad, Mumbai, Kolkata and Chennai.

== Investigation ==
The SFIO is tasked with conducting investigations into a company's affairs when the government deems it necessary. Such instances arise in various scenarios:

- Upon receiving a report from the Registrar of Companies or inspector under section 208 of the Companies Act, 2013.
- Upon notification of a special resolution passed by a company indicating the necessity of an investigation into its affairs.
- On public interest.
- Upon request from any department of the central government or a state government.

== See also ==
- List of financial supervisory authorities by country
