= Century Plyboards =

Indian plywood manufacturer

- Trade name: CENTURYPLY
- Type: Public limited company
- Traded as: BSE: 532548; NSE: CENTURYPLY
- ISIN: INE348B01021
- Industry: Plywood and Veneers
- Founded: 1986
- Founders: Sajjan Bhajanka; Sanjay Agarwal
- Headquarters: Kolkata, West Bengal, India
- Products: Plywood; Laminates; Doors; PVCs and veneers
- Subsidiaries: Century Plywood (Singapore)
- Website: www.centuryply.com

Century Plyboards (India) Ltd. is an Indian manufacturer, seller and exporter of plywoods, laminates, doors, PVCs and veneers. The company offers plywood products under the brand name, Century Ply, and exports its products to over 20 countries. Spread into a 6.6-acre area, the company's plant is located at Bishnupur, near Joka, Kolkata. Century Plyboards started the commercial production of MDF (Medium Density Fibre) at its newly set-up unit at Punjab recently. Century Ply (Singapore) Pte. Ltd., a subsidiary of Century Plyboards, has acquired 49% stake in Huesoulin Wood Processing Factory Co. Ltd., making it as its associate company.

== History ==
Century Plyboard was founded in 1986 by Sajjan Bhajanka and Sanjay Agarwal in Kolkata. Sajjan Bhajanka has been serving as its chairman since 31 October 2011. He serves as the Chairman of Star Ferro and Cement Limited, Century Plyboards Ltd. and Shyam Century Ferrous Limited. In 2013, the company launched its furniture stores under the sub-brand 'Nesta'. In the same year, the company launched its subsidiary company Century Infotech. In 2015, Century Ply (Singapore) Pte. Ltd., a subsidiary of Century Plyboards (India) Ltd in Singapore incorporated Century Ply Laos Co. Ltd. in Laos. The company began its manufacturing facilities near Kolkata, Karnal, Guwahati, Hoshiarpur, Kandla and Chennai and opened stores in many parts of India. It became the first company to receive ISO 9002 certification for veneer and plywood. Its subsidiary Century Infra was incorporated on 30 December 2021.

== Total Cover Warranty ==
In August 2026, Century Plyboards launched Total Cover, a warranty programme covering its Club Prime and Architect Ply products. The programme provides coverage for up to 10 years from purchase, under which the company stated that, in the event of a confirmed product defect, it would reimburse the cost of the defective plywood and certain furniture-related costs, including laminates or veneers, adhesives, labour and transportation.

=== EV Delivery Vans ===
Century Plyboards launched a pilot project of EV delivery vans in July 2022. The vans are claimed to reduce carbon emissions by 17-30%.

== Board of directors ==
Sanjay Agarwal is the Promoter and MD of Century Ply Boards (India) Ltd. He is also the Promoter and Director of Star Cement and a key member of the executive committee of Indian Chamber of Commerce, Member of Confederation of Indian Industry (East) and Member of Young Presidents Organization GOLD (Kolkata). Sunil Mitra, Debanjan Mandal, and Vijay Chhibber serve as Directors while Nikita Bansal and Keshav Bhajanka serve as Executive Directors of the company. In addition, the company has 11 other board members.

== Awards ==
CenturyPly is the first ISO 9002 company in India for Veneer and Plywood. In 2012, the company won Alumni Achievement Awards; Cool Tool Award 2012 Winner, and Network Marketing Awards. In 2022, Century Plyboards (India) Ltd won E4m Pride of India Brands Honors.

== CSR activities ==
In November 2019, Century Ply donated INR 2 lakh to Tata Medical Center for the treatment of underprivileged patients of breast cancer.

In July 2021, the company pledged to plant 10,000 trees across West Bengal and Haryana as part of Van Mahotsav.
