= Institution of Valuers =

- Abbreviation: IOV
- Successor: IOV Registered Valuers Foundation
- Formation: 1968
- Type: National Valuation Body
- Legal status: Society
- Purpose: Empowering Valuers of India
- Headquarters: New Delhi
- Region served: India
- Members: 22500
- Official language: Hindi and English
- Honorary General Secretary: Dr. Vinay K. Goel
- Main organ: Council
- Staff: 50
- Website: institutionofvaluers.net
- Remarks: Phone: (91) (011) 270 12855 / 56 / 57

Official website of IOV

The Institution of Valuers (IOV) is a national valuation body for licensing and regulation of the valuation professionals in India specialized in various disciplines and various kinds of assets. It was founded in 1968 by Shri P. C. Goel, also named as the Father of the Indian Valuer, and presently has a membership of over 30,000 valuers spread across 56 branches in India. The IOV serves recommendations on valuation procedures and related disputes to governmental as well as non governmental organizations, imparts training to valuation professionals, and develops standards in asset valuation.

IOV is amongst the top five valuers association of the world on the basis of registered valuation professionals. The Institution of Valuers brings into its fold valuers of immovable property, agricultural lands, coffee estates, stocks, shares and debentures of companies, shares of a partner in a partnership, business assets including goodwill, jewellery, precious stones and ornaments, works of art, life interest reversions and interests expectancy, tea estates, standing forests, mines and quarries, machinery, electrical equipments, industry etc.
