= Company seal =

Official seal used by a company

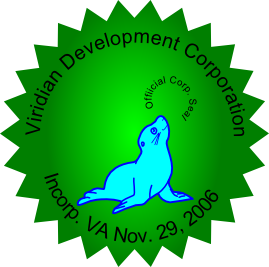
Example of a corporate seal. In this case, the word "seal" is also used as visual pun: an image of the marine animal of the same name appears on the device

A company seal (sometimes referred to as the corporate seal or common seal) is an official seal used by a company. Company seals were predominantly used by companies in common law jurisdictions, although in modern times, most countries have done away with the use of seals.

In the UK, a company may have a company seal under the provisions of Companies Act 2006 section 45. It may have further seals for other territories and for issuing securities. These seals have the additional legend of the territory or the word SECURITIES. A company may wish still to seal documents as a means of protection against forgery.

Traditionally, the seal was of some legal significance because the affixing of the seal signified that the document was the act and deed of the company, whereas when a document was merely signed by a director, then that was deemed to be an act carried out on behalf of the company by its agents, which was subject to applicable restrictions and limitations under the ordinary law of agency.

Corporate seals are generally only used for two purposes by corporations today:

- Documents which need to be executed as deeds (as opposed to simple contracts), may be executed under the company's common seal
- Certain corporate documents, for example share certificates are often issued under the company seal (and some countries required that share certificates be issued under the common seal). For example, in India a share certificate is given under the common seal of the company and each usage of common seal is documented in the statutory registry of the company.

Physically, seals were previously used to make an impression on melted wax on the relevant document, although modern seals will usually only leave an indentation or impression on the paper (although sometimes a red wafer is used to imitate old red wax seals, and to make the sealing show up better on photocopies).

== In Asia ==
The Chinese version of a company seal is known as a company chop and takes the form of a usually circular stamp. The term reportedly came from Indian English. Partially derived from East Asian seals, the chop has great legal significance and represents the whole company. Chops must be made by authorized stamp-makers and registered with public safety authorities. Forgery of stamps, including government stamps and company seals, is a criminal offense in China.

Hong Kong also has a system of company chops, but it is not mandatory and can be replaced by a signature. In Singapore, a company chop is essential as it is in China.

The company chop plays a central role in the two-year dispute between Arm Ltd. and its Chinese subsidiary. A rogue CEO kept control of the chop, thus exerting control on the company against the will of shareholders.
