= Ministry of Corporate Affairs =

Government ministry of India

- Branch of Government of India

- Ministry of Corporate Affairs

Agency overview
- Formed: 2003
- Jurisdiction: Government of India
- Headquarters: Shastri Bhawan, New Delhi, India
- Agency executives: Nirmala Sitharaman, Minister of Corporate Affairs; Harsh Malhotra, Minister of State for Corporate Affairs
- Website: www.mca.gov.in

The Ministry of Corporate Affairs is an Indian government ministry primarily concerned with administration of the Companies Act 2013, the Companies Act 1956, the Limited Liability Partnership Act, 2008, and the Insolvency and Bankruptcy Code, 2016.

It is responsible mainly for the regulation of Indian enterprises in the industrial and services sector. The ministry is mostly run by civil servants of the ICLS cadre. These officers are selected through the Civil Services Examination conducted by Union Public Service Commission. The highest post, Director General of Corporate Affairs (DGCoA), is fixed at Apex Scale for the ICLS. The current minister is Nirmala Sitaraman.

== Administration ==
The ministry administers the following acts:

- Companies Act, 2013
- Companies Act, 1956
- Insolvency and Bankruptcy Code, 2016
- Competition Act, 2002
- Monopolies and Restrictive Trade Practices Act, 1969
- Chartered Accountants Act, 1949 [As amended by the Chartered Accountants (Amendment) Act, 2006]
- Company Secretaries Act, 1980 [As amended by The Company Secretaries (Amendment) Act, 2006]
- Cost and Works Accountants Act, 1959 [As Amended By The Cost And Works Accountants (Amendment) Act, 2006]
- Companies (Donation to National) Fund Act, 1951
- Indian Partnership Act, 1932
- Societies Registration Act, 1860
- Companies Amendment Act, 2006
- Limited Liability Partnership Act, 2008

In August 2013, the Companies Act, 2013 was passed to regulate corporations by increasing responsibilities of corporate executives and is intended to avoid the accounting scandals such as the Satyam scandal which have plagued India. It replaces the Companies Act, 1956 which has proven outmoded in terms of handling 21st century problems.

The Ministry has constituted a Committee for framing of National Competition Policy (India) and related matters (formulate amendments in the Act) under the Chairmanship of Dhanendra Kumar, former chairman of Competition Commission of India.

== Training academies ==
- Indian Institute of Corporate Affairs (Only for Union Civil Service Staff Training)

== Statutory professional bodies ==
- Institute of Chartered Accountants of India
- Institute of Cost Accountants of India
- Institute of Company Secretaries of India
- Institution of Valuers
- All India Management Association

== Statutory bodies ==
- Competition Commission of India (CCI)
- Insolvency and Bankruptcy Board of India (IBBI)
- Investor Education and Protection Fund Authority (IEPFA)
- National Company Law Appellate Tribunal (NCLAT)
- National Company Law Tribunal (NCLT)
- National Financial Reporting Authority (NFRA)
- Registrar of Companies
- Serious Fraud Investigation Office

== List of ministers for corporate affairs ==
#	Name	Portrait	Term of office		Duration	Political party (Alliance)	Prime Minister
1	R. K. Shanmukham Chetty		15 August 1947	1949	1 year, 139 days	Indian National Congress	Jawaharlal Nehru
2	John Mathai		1949	1950	1 year, 0 days	Indian National Congress	Jawaharlal Nehru
3	C. D. Deshmukh		29 May 1950	1957	6 years, 217 days	Indian National Congress	Jawaharlal Nehru
4	T. T. Krishnamachari		1957	13 February 1958	1 year, 43 days	Indian National Congress	Jawaharlal Nehru
5	Jawaharlal Nehru		13 February 1958	13 March 1958	28 days	Indian National Congress	Jawaharlal Nehru
6	Morarji Desai		13 March 1958	29 August 1963	5 years, 169 days	Indian National Congress	Jawaharlal Nehru
7	T. T. Krishnamachari		29 August 1963	1965	1 year, 125 days	Indian National Congress	Jawaharlal Nehru; Lal Bahadur Shastri
8	Sachindra Chaudhuri		1965	13 March 1967	2 years, 71 days	Indian National Congress	Lal Bahadur Shastri; Indira Gandhi
9	Indira Gandhi		1967	1971	4 years, 0 days	Indian National Congress	Indira Gandhi
10	Yashwantrao Chavan		1971	1975	4 years, 0 days	Indian National Congress (R)	Indira Gandhi
11	Chidambaram Subramaniam		1975	1977	2 years, 0 days	Indian National Congress (R)	Indira Gandhi
12	Haribhai M. Patel		24 March 1977	24 January 1979	1 year, 306 days	Janata Party	Morarji Desai
13	Charan Singh		24 January 1979	28 July 1979	185 days	Janata Party	Morarji Desai
14	Hemvati Nandan Bahuguna		28 July 1979	14 January 1980	170 days	Janata Party (Secular)	Charan Singh
15	R. Venkataraman		14 January 1980	15 January 1982	2 years, 1 day	Indian National Congress (I)	Indira Gandhi
16	Pranab Mukherjee		15 January 1982	31 December 1984	2 years, 351 days	Indian National Congress (I)	Indira Gandhi
17	V. P. Singh		31 December 1984	24 January 1987	2 years, 24 days	Indian National Congress (I)	Rajiv Gandhi
18	Rajiv Gandhi		24 January 1987	25 July 1987	182 days	Indian National Congress (I)	Rajiv Gandhi
19	N. D. Tiwari		25 July 1987	25 June 1988	336 days	Indian National Congress (I)	Rajiv Gandhi
20	Shankarrao Chavan		25 June 1988	2 December 1989	1 year, 160 days	Indian National Congress (I)	Rajiv Gandhi
21	Madhu Dandavate		2 December 1989	10 November 1990	343 days	Janata Dal (National Front)	V. P. Singh
22	Yashwant Sinha		10 November 1990	21 June 1991	223 days	Samajwadi Janata Party (National Front)	Chandra Shekhar
23	Manmohan Singh		21 June 1991	16 May 1996	4 years, 330 days	Indian National Congress (I)	P. V. Narasimha Rao
24	Jaswant Singh		16 May 1996	1 June 1996	16 days	Bharatiya Janata Party	Atal Bihari Vajpayee
25	P. Chidambaram		1 June 1996	21 April 1997	324 days	Tamil Maanila Congress (United Front)	H. D. Deve Gowda
26	I.K. Gujral		21 April 1997	22 May 2004	7 years, 31 days	Janata Dal (United Front)	I. K. Gujral
27	Prem Chand Gupta		22 May 2004	30 November 2008	4 years, 192 days	Indian National Congress (United Progressive Alliance)	Manmohan Singh
28	H. R. Bhardwaj		30 November 2008	24 January 2009	55 days	Indian National Congress (United Progressive Alliance)	Manmohan Singh
29	Veerappa Moily		26 June 2012	31 July 2012	35 days	Indian National Congress (United Progressive Alliance)	Manmohan Singh
30	Sachin Pilot		31 July 2012	26 May 2014	1 year, 299 days	Indian National Congress (United Progressive Alliance)	Manmohan Singh
31	Arun Jaitley		26 May 2014	30 May 2019	5 years, 4 days	Bharatiya Janata Party (National Democratic Alliance)	Narendra Modi
32	Nirmala Sitharaman		30 May 2019	Incumbent	7 years, 70 days	Bharatiya Janata Party (National Democratic Alliance)	Narendra Modi

== List of ministers of state ==
Minister of state	Portrait	Political party	Term		Days
Bedabrata Barua		Indian National Congress	1969	1970	1 year
Nirmala Sitharaman		Bharatiya Janata Party	26 May 2014	9 November 2014	167 days
Arjun Ram Meghwal		Bharatiya Janata Party	5 July 2016	3 September 2017	1 year, 60 days
P. P. Chaudhary		Bharatiya Janata Party	3 September 2017	30 May 2019	1 year, 269 days
Anurag Thakur		Bharatiya Janata Party	30 May 2019	7 July 2021	2 years, 38 days
Rao Inderjit Singh		Bharatiya Janata Party	7 July 2021	Incumbent	5 years, 32 days

== See also ==
- Registrar of Companies, India
- List of company registers
- Indian Institute of Corporate Affairs
- Ministry of Cooperation (India)
- List of agencies of the government of India
