= Institute of Company Secretaries of India =

National professional body

The Institute of Company Secretaries of India
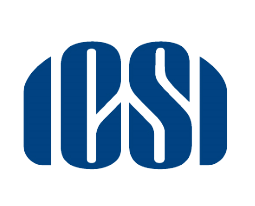
- Abbreviation: ICSI
- Formation: 4 October 1968; 58 years ago
- Type: National Professional Body
- Legal status: Statutory body under an act of Parliament of India, i.e. the Company Secretaries Act, 1980 (Act No. 56 of 1980)
- Headquarters: 22, ICSI HOUSE, Lodhi Road, Institutional Area, Lodhi Colony, New Delhi 110003, India
- Region served: India
- Members: 75,000
- Official language: English, Hindi
- President: CS Pawan Chandak
- Parent organization: Ministry of Corporate Affairs, Government of India
- Website: www.icsi.edu

The Institute of Company Secretaries of India (ICSI) is a national professional body in India under the ownership of Ministry of Corporate Affairs, Government of India with the objective of promoting, regulating and developing the profession of company secretaries in India. It is headquartered in New Delhi, has four regional offices, at New Delhi, Chennai, Kolkata and Mumbai, and 73 chapters around the country.

A person can apply for membership by passing all three levels of examinations: CSEET (earlier Foundation), Executive and Professional prescribed by ICSI, and completing short-term and long-term practical training. The members of the ICSI are highly qualified professionals playing a key role in ensuring compliance with the laws and promoting sound corporate governance practices in Indian Corporates.

== Role of Company Secretary ==
As per Section 2(51) of the Companies Act 2013, Company Secretaries are a company's Key Managerial Personnel (KMP). Other KMPs in a company include the Chief Executive Officer, the managing director, the Whole-time Director, the Chief Financial Officer, and such other officers designated by the Board as KMP but are not more than one level below the directors in whole-time employment. They often hold the position of a compliance officer and play a crucial role in ensuring the efficient administration of the company. Among others, they also ensure that the company complies with secretarial standards.
