= National Company Law Tribunal =

Quasi-judicial body in India

- राष्ट्रीय कंपनी विधि अधिकरण

Quasi-judicial body overview
- Formed: 1 June 2016; 10 years ago
- Jurisdiction: Government of India
- Parent department: Ministry of Corporate Affairs
- Website: https://nclt.gov.in/

The National Company Law Tribunal (NCLT) is a quasi-judicial body in India that adjudicates issues relating to Indian companies. The tribunal, established under the Companies Act 2013, was constituted on 1 June 2016 by the government of India and is based on the recommendation of the V. Balakrishna Eradi committee on law relating to the insolvency and the winding up of companies.

== National Company Law Tribunal ==
All proceedings under the Companies Act, including proceedings relating to arbitration, compromise, arrangements, reconstructions and winding up of companies, are to be before the NCLT. The NCLT bench is chaired by a Judicial member, who is to be a serving or retired High Court Judge, and a Technical member, who must be from the Indian Corporate Law Service (ICLS) cadre.

The National Company Law Tribunal is the adjudicating authority for the insolvency resolution process of companies and limited liability partnerships under the Insolvency and Bankruptcy Code, 2016.

No criminal court shall have jurisdiction to entertain any suit or proceeding in respect of any matter which the Tribunal or the Appellate Tribunal is empowered to determine by or under this Act or any other law for the time being in force and no injunction shall be granted by any court or other authority in respect of any action taken or to be taken in pursuance of any power conferred by or under this Act or any other law for the time being in force, by the Tribunal or the Appellate Tribunal.

The tribunal has sixteen benches, six at New Delhi (one being the principal bench) and two at Ahmedabad, one at Prayagraj, one at Bengaluru, one at Chandigarh, two at Chennai, one at Cuttack, one at Guwahati, three at Hyderabad of which one is at Amaravathi, one at Jaipur, one at Kochi, two at Kolkata and five at Mumbai. Of the two new benches approved to be set up, one each in Indore and Amaravathi, the Indore bench is yet to be notified. Except the Bench at Amaravati, all the benches have been notified as division benches. Justice R. Sudhakar, a retired Chief Justice of Manipur High Court has been appointed as president of the tribunal since 1 November 2021.

The National Company Law Tribunal has the power under the Companies Act to adjudicate proceedings:

1. Initiated before the Company Law Board under the previous act (the Companies Act, 1956);
2. Pending before the Board for Industrial and Financial Reconstruction, including those pending under the Sick Industrial Companies (Special Provisions) Act, 1985;
3. Pending before the Appellate Authority for Industrial and Financial Reconstruction; and
4. Pertaining to claims of oppression and mismanagement of a company, winding up of companies and all other powers prescribed under the Companies Act.

== List of present members ==
Following is the list of Hon'ble President and Sitting Members:

Sr.No	Name	Designation	Date of Joining	NCLT Bench
1	Chief Justice (Retd) Ramalingam Sudhakar	President	01-11-2021	Principal Bench
2	Shyam Babu Gautam	Member	03-07-2019	Kochi
3	Patibandla Satyanarayana Prasad	Member	04-07-2019	Chandigarh
4	Venkata Subba Rao Hari	Member	04-07-2019	Guwahati
5	Laxmi Narayan Gupta	Member	04-07-2019	New Delhi
6	Satya Ranjan Prasad	Member	24-07-2019	Guwahati
7	Deep Chandra Joshi	Member	13-09-2021	Jaipur
8	Rahul Prasad Bhatnagar	Member	13-09-2021	New Delhi
9	Avinash K Srivastava	Member	13-09-2021	New Delhi
10	Anuradha Sanjay Bhatia	Member	13-09-2021	Amravati
11	Rohit Kapoor	Member	14-09-2021	Kolkatta
12	P Mohan Raj	Member	15-09-2021	Cuttack
13	Harnam Singh Thakur	Member	16-09-2021	Chandigarh
14	Balraj Joshi	Member	16-09-2021	Kolkatta
15	Manoj Kumar Dubey	Member	16-09-2021	Bengaluru
16	Subrata Kumar Dash	Member	20-09-2021	Chandigarh
17	Kaushelndra Kumar Singh	Member	01-10-2021	Indore
18	Dr V R Badrinath Nandula	Member	04-10-2021	Hyderabad
19	Sameer Kakar	Member	09-10-2021	Ahmedabad
20	Bacchu Venkat Balaram Das	Member	18-10-2021	New Delhi
21	Kishore Vemulapalli	Member	06-12-2021	Mumbai
22	Kuldip Kumar Kareer	Member	18-11-2022	Mumbai
23	Praveen Kumar Gupta	Member	18-11-2022	Allahabad
24	Ashok Kumar Bhardwaj	Member	18-11-2022	New Delhi
25	Bidisha Banerjee	Member	18-11-2022	Kolkatta
26	Charan Singh	Member	18-11-2022	Hyderabad
27	Anu Jagmohan Singh	Member	18-11-2022	Mumbai
28	Ashish Kumar Verma	Member	18-11-2022	Allahabad
29	Atul Chaturvedi	Member	18-11-2022	New Delhi
30	Prabhat Kumar	Member	18-11-2022	Mumbai
31	T Krishna Valli	Member	22-11-2022	Kochi
32	Madhu Sinha	Member	09-12-2022	Mumbai
33	Sanjiv Jain	Member	04-01-2023	Chennai
34	Mahendra Khandelwal	Member	18-01-2023	New Delhi
35	Shammi Khan	Member	20-02-2023	Ahmedabad
36	Virendrasingh Gyansingh Bisht	Member	19-07-2023	Mumbai
37	Lakshmi Gurung	Member	19-07-2023	Mumbai
38	Reeta Kohli	Member	19-07-2023	Mumbai
39	Rajeev Bhardwaj	Member	19-07-2023	Hyderabad
40	Manni Sankariah Shanmuga Sundaram	Member	19-07-2023	New Delhi
41	Chitra Ram Hankare	Member	19-07-2023	Ahmedabad
42	Rajeev Mehrotra	Member	19-07-2023	Jaipur
43	Sanjiv Dutt	Member	19-07-2023	Mumbai
44	Sanjay Puri	Member	19-07-2023	Hyderabad
45	Umesh Kumar Shukla	Member	19-07-2023	Chandigarh
46	Arvind Devanathan	Member	19-07-2023	Kolkatta
47	Ravichandran Ramasamy	Member	19-07-2023	Chennai
48	Venkataraman Subramaniam	Member	19-07-2023	Chennai
49	Velamur Govindan Venkata Chalapathy	Member	19-07-2023	Ahmedabad
50	Anil Raj Chellan	Member	19-07-2023	Mumbai
51	Charanjeet Singh Gulati	Member	19-07-2023	Mumbai
52	K R Saji Kumar	Member	01-08-2023	Mumbai
53	Sanjeev Ranjan	Member	18-09-2023	New Delhi
54	Jyoti Kumar Tripathi	Member	11-10-2023	Chennai
55	K. Biswal	Member		Bengaluru

== Appeals ==
Decisions of the tribunal may be appealed to the National Company Law Appellate Tribunal, the decisions of which may further be appealed to the Supreme Court of India on a point of law. The Supreme Court of India has upheld the Insolvency and Bankruptcy Code in its entirety.
