= Companies Act, 1956 =

Act of the Parliament of India, enabling companies to be formed by registration

Parliament of India
- Long title: An Act to consolidate and amend the law relating to companies and certain other associations
- Citation: Act No. 1 of 1956
- Territorial extent: India
- Enacted by: Parliament of India
- Enacted: 18 January 1956
- Commenced: 1 April 1956 and amendment 2015

Repeals
- Some provisions of the Act are still in force (as per Ministry of Corporate Affairs Website)
- Status: Repealed

The Companies Act, 1956 was an Act of the Parliament of India, enacted in 1956, which enabled companies to be formed by registration, and set out the responsibilities of companies, their directors and secretaries. It was repealed and replaced by the Companies Act 2013.

== History ==
The Act was administered by the Government of India through the Ministry of Corporate Affairs and the Offices of Registrar of Companies, Official Liquidators, Public Trustee, Company Law Board, Director of Inspection, etc. The Registrar of Companies (ROC) handles incorporation of new companies and the administration of running companies.

Since its commencement, it was amended many times, in which amendment of 1988, 1990, 1996, 2000, 2011 & 2013 were notable.

== Types of companies ==
The Companies Act, 1956 provided for the registration of 11 types of company.

- Private company
- Public company
- Companies limited by shares
- Companies limited by guarantee
- Unlimited company
- Section 25 company
- Government companies
- Foreign companies
- Profitable or non profitable companies

== See also ==
- Companies Act 2013
