= Companies Act, 2013 =

Indian company law legislation

Parliament of India
- Long title: An Act to consolidate and amend the law relating to companies.
- Citation: The Companies Act, 2013
- Territorial extent: India
- Enacted by: Parliament of India
- Signed by: President of India
- Signed: 29 August 2013
- Commenced: 12 September 2013 (98 sections); 1 April 2014 (184 sections)

Legislative history
- Bill title: Companies Bill, 2012
- Bill citation: Bill No. 121-C of 2011

Repeals
- Companies Act, 1956

Amended by
- Companies (Amendment) Bill, 2020
- Status: In force

The Companies Act, 2013 (No. 18 of 2013) is an Act of the Parliament of India which forms the primary source of Indian company law. It received presidential assent on 29 August 2013, and largely superseded the Companies Act, 1956.

The Act was brought into force in stages. Section 1 of this act came into force on 30 August 2013. 98 different sections came into force on 12 September 2013 with a few changes. A total of another 183 sections came into force from 1 April 2014. The Ministry of Corporate Affairs thereafter published a notification exempting private companies from the ambit of various sections under the act.

The Act increased the responsibilities of corporate executives in the information technology sector, increasing India's safeguards against organised cybercrime by allowing CEOs and CTOs to be prosecuted in cases of IT failure.

The Act established the National Company Law Tribunal (NCLT), which was constituted on 1 June 2016, based on the recommendation of the Justice Eradi committee on the law relating to insolvency and winding up of companies. Further, the National Financial Reporting Authority (NFRA) was established in March 2018 as an oversight body to investigate matters of professional misconduct by chartered accountants or CA firms.

== Corporate Social Responsibility ==
Before the Act, corporate social responsibility (CSR) requirements applied only to public sector companies. Section 135 of the Companies Act introduced mandatory CSR contributions for large companies, making it the only mandatory CSR law in the world. All firms above a particular net worth, turnover, or net profit threshold are required to spend at least 2% of their annual profits of the preceding year on corporate social responsibility. The law requires that all such companies establish a CSR committee to oversee the spending.

== Company Secretaries ==
Section 203 of the Companies Act 2013 deals with the appointment of a company secretary. For the first time, the Act defined company secretaries as a key managerial personnel of the company. The Act made it mandatory for every Indian listed company, and every other entity having more than rupees ten crore (100 million) paid up capital, to have a full-time company secretary.

== Types of companies ==
In addition to private and public limited companies, the Act also provides for a One Person Company (OPC), Section 8 companies, and producer companies. OPC are companies with a single member. Only individual Indian citizens can be shareholders in an OPC. At first, only resident Indians could be shareholders, but after an amendment to the Act in 2020, even non-resident Indians can be shareholders. Section 8 companies are non-profit companies governed by section 8 of the Act. Producer Companies are formed for agricultural purposes. Only farmers can be members of a producer company. They are governed by Section 378A to Section 378ZT of the Companies Act, 2013.

== Oppression and Mismanagement ==
Sections 241 and 242 of the Companies Act, 2013 provide remedies to shareholders and members against oppression and mismanagement in company affairs. Section 241 allows eligible members to apply to the National Company Law Tribunal (NCLT) where the affairs of the company are conducted in a manner prejudicial to public interest, oppressive to any member, or detrimental to the company's interests. Section 242 empowers the NCLT to grant appropriate relief, including regulation of company affairs, removal of directors, setting aside or modifying agreements, and other orders necessary to bring an end to the oppressive or prejudicial conduct. These provisions aim to protect minority shareholders and ensure fair corporate governance.

== See also ==
- Indian company law
- UK company law
- European company law
- US corporate law
