= Dhanendra Kumar =

Civil servant

Dhanendra Kumar (1946-2026) was a civil servant who was the first chair of Competition Commission of India (CCI). Kumar formerly served as executive director at World Bank.

== Biography ==
Born in 1946, Kumar joined the Indian Administrative Service (IAS) in 1968. Kumar has served as a secretary to the following ministries:

- Ministry of Defence,
- Ministry of Road Transport and Highways
- Ministry of Culture

Kumar is the founder of the chairman of Competition Advisory Services (India) LLP (COMPAD). During his career, the Ministry of Corporate Affairs (MCA) has constituted a Committee under his chairmanship for framing of National Competition Policy (India) and related matters (formulate amendments in the Act).

The Ministry of Housing and Urban Poverty Alleviation (MHUPA) has constituted a Committee under his chairmanship on Streamlining Approval Procedures for Real Estate Projects (SAPREP). Kumar is currently assisting Indian Institute of Corporate Affairs (of Ministry of Corporate Affairs, Government of India) as Principal Advisor and Chief Mentor of School of Competition Law – the upcoming National Centre of Excellence.

Kumar is invited regularly by all major business focused media houses and newspapers in India viz. The Economic Times, Business Standard, Mint (newspaper), Businessworld, Hindustan Times, The Financial Express (India), Moneycontrol, CNBC TV18, Deccan Herald, Business Line, Navbharat Times, Hindustan (newspaper), Amar Ujala, The Quint amongst others to author articles and OpEd on business topics of contemporary interest.

== Awards ==
Kumar was given the National Citizen's Award by Mother Teresa for outstanding contribution in development of Industrial Parks in Haryana. Kumar was also awarded honorary doctorate in recognition of outstanding contribution in public affairs.

== Career ==
From	To	Designation	Institution
04/2012	Present	Chairman	Committee – Streamlining Approval Procedures for Real Estate Projects (SAPREP), Ministry of Housing and Urban Poverty Alleviation (MHUPA)
06/2011	Present	Chairman	Committee – National Competition Policy, Ministry of Corporate Affairs
02/2009	06/2011	Chairman	Competition Commission of India
11/2005	01/2009	Executive Director – India, Bangladesh, Sri Lanka, Bhutan	The World Bank
08/2005	10/2005	Secretary	Ministry of Defence, Government of India
07/2004	07/2005	Secretary	Ministry of Road Transport and Highways, Government of India
10/2002	06/2004	Secretary	Ministry of Culture, Government of India
05/2002	10/2002	Chairman & managing director	Rural Electrification Corporation Ltd.
09/1998	05/2002	Additional Secretary	Ministry of Communications, Government of India
05/1996	09/1998	Financial Commissioner	Government of Haryana
06/1991	05/1996	Principal Secretary to Chief Minister	Government of Haryana
06/1991	05/1996	Chairman	Haryana State Industrial & Infrastructure Development Corporation Limited (HSIIDC)
05/1991	05/1991	Joint Secretary	Ministry of Textiles, Government of India
08/1988	05/1991	managing director	Haryana State Industrial & Infrastructure Development Corporation Limited (HSIIDC)
05/1986	07/1988	Joint Secretary	Ministry of Agriculture, Government of India
01/1983	05/1986	Resident Director	Indian Investment Centre, London
08/1979	01/1983	Director of Industries	Government of Haryana
06/1978	07/1979	Registrar of Cooperative Societies	Government of Haryana
07/1977	06/1978	Deputy Secretary (Irrigation and Power)	Government of Haryana
10/1976	07/1977	District collector	District of Karnal, Government of Haryana
11/1975	10/1976	District collector	District of Jind, Government of Haryana
08/1973	10/1975	Labour Commissioner	Government of Haryana
04/1969	08/1973	Assistant Commissioner (Ambala)	Government of Haryana
04/1969	08/1973	Sub Divisional Officer–Civil (Hansi)	Government of Haryana
04/1969	08/1973	Additional District collector	Government of Haryana

== Articles and OpEds in popular press ==
Newspaper/Media Group	Title	YYYY/DD	Theme
The Economic Times	Bharti's BT Group deal could open doors for the 'real East India Company' to flourish	2024/08	Telecom & IT
The Economic Times	Developing our skiller instinct	2024/08	Indian Economy
Business Standard	GST reforms shaping India's economic future	2024/08	Indian Economy
Business Standard	E-commerce as a major building block for Viksit Bharat@2047	2024/07	Investment
Business Standard	Budget 2024: Defining trajectory pathways for Viksit Bharat@2047	2024/07	Investment
Amar Ujala	Reform of bankruptcy law is included in the 100 days agenda of Modi government, what is the need for it?	2024/07	Insolvency & Bankruptcy Code (IBC)
Business Standard	Impact of Digital Competition Bill on India's homegrown startup ecosystem	2024/07	Competition Law
Businessworld	Reform Insolvency Law To Expedite Resolutions And Include Cross-Border & Group Insolvencies	2024/06	Insolvency & Bankruptcy Code (IBC)
The Economic Times	India's path to developed economy status hinges on natural resource management	2024/06	Economy - Natural Resources
Hindustan (newspaper)	Some important steps to make India better	2024/06	Indian Economy
Mint (newspaper)	Modi 3.0: What the PM may focus on for India's transformation into Viksit Bharat	2024/06	Indian Economy
Businessworld	ESG Assumes Criticality As Delhi & Other Parts Sizzle Above 50 Degree Celsius	2024/06	ESG
Business Standard	Role of foreign investments in India's thriving startup ecosystem	2024/05	Foreign Investment
Communication Today	Emerging trends in Indian telecom and Artificial Intelligence	2024/05	Telecom & IT
The Economic Times	Ignore India at your own peril	2024/05	Investment
Amar Ujala	Importance of IBC Code and Timely Compliance for Industries in India	2024/05	Insolvency & Bankruptcy Code (IBC)
Mint (newspaper)	IBC tale of delay: Speed up insolvency resolution for this reform to shine	2024/05	Insolvency & Bankruptcy Code (IBC)
Business Standard	Intellectual property and competition law: Two sides of the same coin	2024/04	IPR and Competition Law
Mint (newspaper)	Competition penalties going by global turnover call for a rethink	2024/04	Competition Law
Business Standard	Online gaming can help India's development goals, needs clear regulations	2024/03	Online Gaming
The Economic Times	Big tech, don't be a big brother	2024/03	Competition Law
Navbharat Times	What savings can be achieved through rooftop solar scheme	2024/02	Energy
Business Standard	PM Suryodaya Yojana will help in self-sufficiency in country's energy needs	2024/02	Energy
The Economic Times	Not Complete without Competition	2024/02	Competition Law
Amar Ujala	Indispensability of drones for country's security and border surveillance	2024/02	Defence Sector
Hindustan Times	India's quest for aatmanirbharta in drones	2024/01	Defence Sector
Navbharat Times	Rejuvenation of Ayodhya	2024/01	Culture
Hindustan Times	Single-use technologies in the biopharmaceutical industry	2024/01	Pharma
India Times	Happy Holidays-Guides For Ease Of Travelling Business	2024/01	Travel & Tourism
Businessworld	UNESCO Recognises India's Garba As World's Intangible Cultural Heritage	2023/12	Culture
Hindustan Times	Port control is crucial to national security	2023/12	Infrastructure & Logistics
Business Standard	From local to global: Competition Law gained much traction in 2023	2023/12	Competition Law
Storyboard 18	Self-regulation for safe and accountable online gaming industry	2023/12	Online Gaming
Mint (newspaper)	Excessive executive pay must be held in check for India Inc's sake	2023/12	Corporate Governance
Business Standard	Indian investors need protection from manipulative short-selling practices	2023/11	Investment
Business Standard	Tax conundrum in online gaming landscape: All eyes on the apex court	2023/11	Online Gaming
The Financial Express (India)	Safeguarding India's maritime interests	2023/11	Infrastructure & Logistics
Businessworld	SEBI's Roles as Guardian of Investors, Environment, Sustainability	2023/11	Investment
Navbharat Times	There will be benefit from increasing the scope of DMAT	2023/11	Investment
Business Standard	AI and antitrust: Balancing innovation with competition	2023/10	Competition Law
Hindustan Times	Ports hold the key to growth, employment	2023/10	Infrastructure & Logistics
Mint (newspaper)	Online gaming taxation, Look for a practical way out	2023/10	Online Gaming
Communication Today	Regulation of OTT platforms in India	2023/10	Digital Media
Navbharat Times	Garba can be included in UNESCO Heritage	2023/10	Culture
The Economic Times	BRICS: The mortar of competition in a globalised world	2023/10	Competition Law
The Financial Express (India)	Only pros for mandatory demat	2023/10	Investment
Hindustan Times	Unlocking India's tourism potential	2023/09	Travel & Tourism
Navbharat Times	SEBI's new rules come to save investors	2023/09	Investment
The Economic Times	M&As in the time of digital economy	2023/09	Merger & Acquisition
Businessworld	Protect Indian Investors	2023/09	Investment
Moneycontrol	Strategise on ways to mop up domestic sources with foreign funds drying up for startups	2023/09	Start-up India
Business Standard	G20 Summit will boost India's travel and tourism industry	2023/09	Travel & Tourism
Navbharat Times	Common man's dreams get new fly	2023/09	Civil Aviation
Businessworld	Role Of General Counsels In Competition Compliance	2023/08	Competition Law, GC
The Economic Times	A competitive aviation sector is truly giving wings to India's rapidly growing economy	2023/08	Civil Aviation
CNBC TV18	Online Gaming-here's how the new taxation effectively cascades from 28% to over 50%	2023/08	Online Gaming
Navbharat Times	How will customers become king in the power sector?	2023/07	Power
The Economic Times	India has become the most sought-after investment destination for Singapore	2023/07	Investment
Hindustan Times	EV adoption guidelines must be more practical	2023/07	Road Transport
The Financial Express (India)	Empowering the power sector	2023/07	Power
Navbharat Times	Will the Vaccine give victory over Diabetes	2023/07	Healthcare
Businessworld	Role of General Counsels in Competition Compliance	2023/07	Competition Law, GC
The Economic Times	If You're a Platform, Pay	2023/07	Digital Media, Competition Law
The Financial Express (India)	Online gaming: guardrails for sustainable growth	2023/07	Online Gaming
Hindustan Times	Developed India needs an efficient bus system	2023/07	Public Transport
Navbharat Times	What did the defense sector get from Modi's US visit?	2023/07	Defence Sector
Business Standard	Diabetes a pandemic, needs vaccines, efficacious medication for contro	2023/07	Healthcare
Mint (newspaper)	The country is ready for a major bulk-up of its defence armory	2023/06	Defence Sector
Communication Today	Telecom, IT, and Internet revolution in India	2023/06	Telecom & IT
Business Standard	14 years of Competition Commission: Young regulator faces new challenges	2023/05	Competition Day 20 May
Business Standard	Entry of foreign law firms in India: A move that may change the landscape	2023/04	Opening Indian Legal Services to Foreign Law Firms
The Financial Express (India)	The global banking crisis and Yes Bank	2023/04	Banking & Financial System
The Economic Times	Foreign trade, a new pathway	2023/04	E-commerce
Business Standard	Historic changes coming in law with Parliament's nod to Competition Bill	2023/04	Competition Law
Businessworld	E-Commerce: Don't Over-Regulate But Let It Expand Consumers' Choice	2023/03	E-Commerce
Businessworld	Country is on a High Growth Trajectory despite Global Headwinds	2023/02	Indian Economy
ASSOCHAM CRA E-Bulletin	Leader's Insight: Interview of Mr Dhanendra Kumar with ASSOCHAM	2023/01	Competition Law
Business Standard	How bike taxis can ease urban mobility woes and boost the economy	2023/01	Mobility & Environment
Deccan Herald	With right policy, bike taxis can ease urban mobility	2023/01	Mobility & Environment
The Financial Express (India)	Don't need a Big Tech Competition Law	2023/01	Digital India
The Hindu Businessline	Digital markets. Why a new law against Big Tech?	2023/01	Digital India
The Financial Express (India)	Looking back at Competition Law in 2022	2022/12	Competition Law
The Financial Express (India)	No settlement route for cartels	2022/12	Competition Law
Navbharat Times	To economy, how much speed will give bike-taxis?	2022/12	Mobility & Environment
Business Standard	G20 presidency gives India opportunity to showcase its ed-tech leadership	2022/12	Digital India
The Economic Times	Yamuna river pollution: Remove froth in surfactant sector	2022/10	Surfactant
Navbharat Times	Its time to say bye-bye paper notes	2022/10	Banking & Financial System
The Economic Times	We should count polymer notes	2022/09	Banking & Financial System
The Economic Times	Tweaking incentives for promoting exports of apparels and garments from India	2022/09	Textiles
The Hindu Businessline	Why India's online gaming industry desperately needs a regulatory architecture	2022/07	Online Gaming
The Financial Express (India)	Law & order in corporate governance	2022/06	Corporate Governance, GC
Business Line	Rationalise FDI approvals under PN3	2022/06	Ease of Doing Business in FDI
The Economic Times	The world is looking at India to show the way in EdTech	2022/06	Start-up India
Indian Business Law Journal	Don't ignore CCI's teeth	2022/05	Competition Law
The Financial Express (India)	The challenges ahead for the Competition Commission of India	2022/05	Competition Law
The Financial Express (India)	The Buddha connect	2022/05	International Relations
The Times of India	India's upcoming foreign trade policy need laser focus on logistics sector and e-commerce	2022/03	Indian Economy
Competition Policy International	Competition policy and start-ups in India	2022/03	Competition Law
The Economic Times	How India can use Covid as an opportunity to build logistics sector better	2022/01	Infrastructure & Logistics
Mint (newspaper)	Amplify e-commerce and help all MSMEs reach markets online	2022/01	Start-up India
The Financial Express (India)	What 2021 held for Indian competition law	(2021/12)	Competition Law
Business Standard	Here's how India's gig economy and its $5-trn goal by 2025 are connected	(2021/12)	Digital India
The Economic Times	View: Can big data be used as a factor to assess 'non-price competition' in the online medium?	(2021/11)	Competition Law
The Financial Express (India)	Bridging learning divide outcomes in online education	(2021/11)	Digital India
Moneycontrol	India is well-placed in the unicorn race	(2021/11)	Start-up India
The Economic Times	View: It is time for BSNL to go down the privatisation path, just like Air India	(2021/10)	Infrastructure & Telecom
Business Line	Allow e-commerce sector in India to flourish	(2021/10)	E-commerce
The Economic Times	Will the new telecom relief package help the ailing industry? A former bureaucrat decodes	(2021/09)	Infrastructure & Telecom
The Economic Times	Why India's ailing telecom sector needs 1999-style bold reforms	(2021/09)	Infrastructure & Telecom
The Quint	AGR Dues & Retrospective Tax: Moving on From Flawed Decisions	(2021/09)	Infrastructure, Telecom & Taxation
Business Line	Enforcing contracts key to ‘ease of business’	(2021/09)	Ease of Doing Business
The Economic Times	View: Reduce the regulatory cholesterol in e-commerce. The draft rules increase it	(2021/07)	Regulatory Reforms in E-commerce
The Financial Express (India)	A behind the curtain look at CCI's analysis of M&A	(2021/07)	Competition Law
The Financial Express (India)	A world-class merger control regime	(2021/06)	Competition Law
The Financial Express (India)	Covid-19 – an inflexion point for e-commerce	(2021/06)	E-commerce & Regulatory reforms
The Financial Express (India)	E-commerce policy: Needed for speedy, inclusive growth	(2021/04)	E-commerce & Regulatory reforms
The Times of India	The fight against Covid is an all-out war. Government must deploy resources and engage the private sector accordingly	(2021/04)	Private Sector Development
Raksha Anirveda	MSME's Start-ups crucial for Atmanirbharta in Defence	(2021/04)	Developing MSMEs for Indian Defence
The Financial Express (India)	Bring The Destination Home: Meetings & social events are scheduled on online platforms, so why not travel?	(2021/03)	Travel Infrastructure
The Times of India	WhatsApp must be investigated on whether it is fiddling with private data to distort market competition	(2021/03)	Competition Law & Data Regulation
Mint (newspaper)	An antitrust probe to safeguard the rights of our WhatsApp users	(2021/03)	Competition Law & Data Regulation
The Indian Express	Time for a defence unicorn	(2021/02)	Developing unicorns in defence
The Indian Express	How to make unicorns and stop the startup drain	(2021/02)	Start-up India & Regulatory reforms
CPI	Reshaping the Contours of Combination Threshold through the 2020 Draft Competition Amendment Bill – Meeting the Need with Digital Merger Control in India?	(2021/02)	Reforms in Competition Law
The Financial Express (India)	Battling Covid-19 with digital armour	(2021/01)	Digital India
The Financial Express (India)	Budget FY22: Budgeting for atmanirbhar growth	(2021/01)	Indian Economy
National Law School of India University	Chilling competition? Trade associations & the Indian Competition Regime	(2020/10)	Competition Law & Trade Associations
The Financial Express (India)	MSMEs: Digitise and modernise to thrive	(2020/07)	Digital India & MSMEs
The Financial Express (India)	Beyond India's Coronavirus Unlock 1.0: An age of innovation	(2020/06)	Digital India & Need of Innovation
The Financial Express (India)	Covid-19 crisis for startups: Innovating to survive, and then thrive	(2020/05)	Need of innovations in startups
The Financial Express (India)	After lockdown, phased reopening: Authorities should proactively work to restart industry and businesses	(2020/05)	Indian Economy-measure to accelerate
Vivekananda International Foundation	Development of Infrastructure in India – The Vehicle for Developing Indian Economy	(2017/04)	Infrastructure development in India
The Indian Express	Regulating lightly - The digital economy calls for a new kind of oversight	(2016/12)	Digital India & Regulations
Business Line	Let them rock	(2015/08)	Digital India & startups
The Financial Express (India)	Competition policy crucial for Narendra Modi's 3S mantra	(2014/07)	Competition Law & Policy
Rail India Technical and Economic Service Journal	World Economic Outlook – Growth Strategies of Developing Countries and the Case of India	(2014/07)	Indian Economy- infrastructure for accelerating economy
The Financial Express (India)	CCIs realty test	(2014/06)	Competition Law
The Financial Express (India)	Taming the TAM	(2013/07)	Competition Law
The Financial Express (India)	Budget and the internet economy	(2013/03)	Indian Economy & internet
Rail India Technical and Economic Service Journal	Global Economic Resurgence: Hopes for Developing Economies	(2013/07)	Developing Economies & infrastructure
Rail India Technical and Economic Service Journal	Competition: Unlocking India's Economic Growth Potential	(2011/07)	Competition for accelerating Indian Economy
Rail India Technical and Economic Service Journal	Competition and Road Transport Sector	(2010/07)	Indian economy & road transport

== See also ==
- Competition Commission of India
- The Competition Act, 2002
- National Competition Policy (India)
