= Bakul Harshadrai Dholakia =

Indian economist

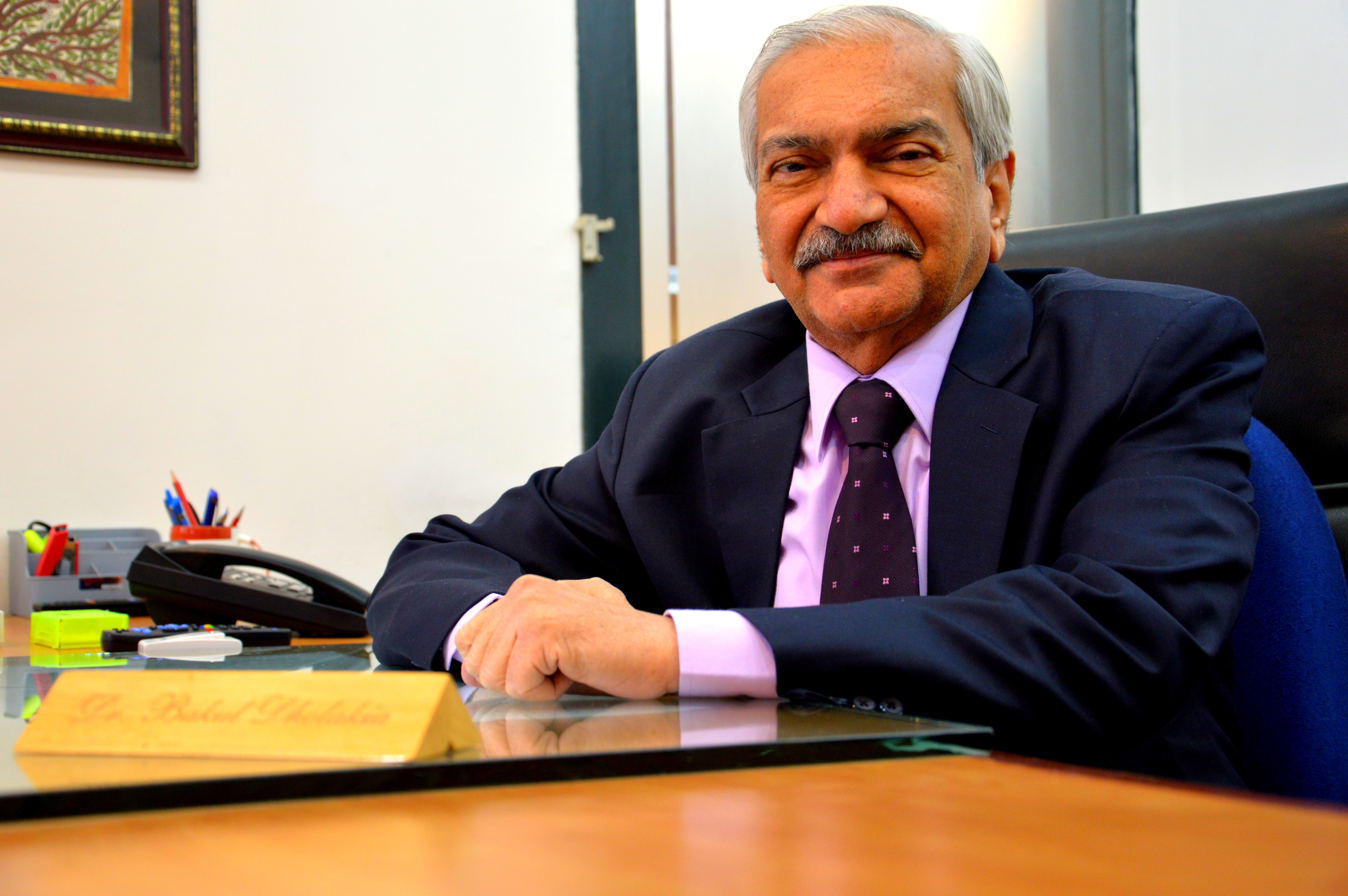
- Dholakia in his office at IMI, New Delhi
- Born: 15 July 1947 (age 79)

Academic background
- Education: Maharaja Sayajirao University of Baroda (B.A., M.A., PhD)
- Influences: Parents (Dr. Harshadrai Dholakia (Father), Vikaswara Dholakia (Mother)); Swami Vivekananda; Mahatma Gandhi

Academic work
- Discipline: Economic Policy, Economic planning, Competitive Strategy, Managerial economics
- School or tradition: Neoclassical Economics
- Institutions: Indian Institute of Management, Ahmedabad; International Management Institute, New Delhi; Adani Institute of Infrastructure Management
- Notable ideas: Management Education in India
- Awards: Padma Shri (2007)

Bakul Harshadrai Dholakia (born 15 July 1947) is the former Director of Indian Institute of Management Ahmedabad (2002–2007). Prior to that, he was the Dean at Ahmedabad (1998–2001) and a professor in Economics He was also the Director General of International Management Institute, New Delhi. Prior to joining IMI New Delhi, he was the Director of Adani Institute of Infrastructure Management and Gujarat Adani Institute of Medical Sciences, Bhuj.

Dholakia is a gold medalist from Baroda University and holds a Doctorate in Economics. He has 45 years of teaching experience, including 33 years at IIM Ahmedabad. He has served as a board member of the Reserve Bank of India Western Area Local Board from 1993 to 2001. He has guided 20 PhD students specialising in Economics, Finance, Business Policy and Public Systems at IIM A. He was awarded the Padma Shri by the Government of India in 2007 for his contributions in the field of Literature and Education.

== Education ==
Bakul Dholakia had completed his PhD in economics from The Maharaja Sayajirao University of Baroda in 1973 at the age of 26 years. His thesis topic was Sources of Economic Growth in India. He was subsequently awarded a University Grants Commission Fellowship. Dholakia had secured a master's degree (M.A.) in Economics with specialisation in Econometrics from Baroda University in 1969. He was awarded the gold medal for securing the First Rank in the course. He was also awarded a merit scholarship by the Government of India. Dholakia completed a bachelor's degree (B.A.) course in economics with mathematics as the minor subject from Baroda University in 1967 and secured the first rank throughout the course. He was awarded the B.A. merit scholarship by Maharaja Sayajirao University of Baroda.

== Academic career ==
Dholakia has 45 years of experience in the education domain including 33 years at IIM Ahmedabad. During his time at IIM Ahmedabad, Dholakia occupied the Reserve Bank of India Chair from 1992 to 1999, served as the Dean from 1998 to 2001 and as the Director of the institute from 2002 to 2007. He has guided 20 PhD students specialising in Economics, Finance, Business Policy and Public Systems at IIM A. Dholakia had served as the Chairman of the MBA Program and also as the Chairman of Economics Area. Raghuram Rajan, Nachiket Mor and popular commentator Harsha Bhogle are some of his students.

=== Teaching ===
Dholakia had taught several courses during his time as a professor in IIM Ahmedabad. For the Post Graduate Programme (MBA) students, he had offered courses such as Economic Analysis for Business Planning, Managerial Economics, Economic Environment and Policy and Econometric Analysis for Management Decisions. He had also taught courses such as Micro-economic Theory, Macroeconomic Theory and Economic Growth and Planning to students of the Doctoral Programme at IIM A. He received the Best Professor Award for teaching in the MBA Program.

Dholakia was involved in teaching assignments in Senior Management Development Programs at IIM Ahmedabad. He offered courses on several modules of Economics such as Managerial Economics, Structural Analysis of Industries, Analysis of Union Budget, Industrial Policy, Demand Forecasting etc. Many of these MDP groups have greatly appreciated his teaching methods including the Top Management Programme, the Senior Executive Programme, the Middle Management Programme, Management Education Programme, Commonwealth Programme on Economic Management and Planning, Advanced Management Programme for Public Enterprises, International Programme on Management of Economic Policy Reforms, etc.

=== Administrative positions ===
Dholakia was the Dean at the Indian Institute of Management Ahmedabad from April 1998 to June 2001. His tenure as director began in October 2002. Under him, IIM-A went from having 12 partner institutions for student exchange programmes to 50 by 2006–07. During his tenure, the one-year programme for management executives was started, and students in the very first batch got the highest salaries offered that year. Dholakia was pivotal in ensuring that the image of IIM-A did not suffer when, in November 2003, the Common Admission Test (CAT) papers got leaked for the first time in the 43-year history of the IIMs. Dholakia opposed the then HRD Minister's decision to ask the IIMs to cut their fees, and as a mark of protest, rejected a Rs 100 million (Rs 100 million) grant IIM-A got from the ministry. He subsequently made sure the institute became self-sufficient. Dholakia had been associated with the Adani Group since December 2007. He had been the Director of Adani Institute of Infrastructure Management and Gujarat Adani Institute of Medical Sciences, Bhuj. He is presently the Director General of International Management Institute, New Delhi.

== Memberships and associations ==
Dholakia was a board member of the Reserve Bank of India Western Area Board from 1993 to 2001. He was appointed by the Government of India as the Chairman of the National Board of Accreditation for Technical Education in India (2005–2008). He has also served as External Director on the boards of several public and private sector companies, including ONGC, Shipping Commission, Torrent Power, RNRL and Mahanagar Gas. He was also on the board of Arvind, Ashima and L&T Power. Over the last two decades, Dholakia has worked on numerous government committees, the recent ones being the Rangarajan Committee on Pricing and Taxation on Petroleum Products (2006) and the Expert Group on Pension Fund constituted by the Government of India (2009). The Competition Commission of India had appointed Dholakia as a member of the Eminent Persons Advisory Group (EPAG). Dholakia was associated with the Indian Council of Social Science Research, Government of India, where he was one of the three members responsible for the restructuring of the ICSSR. He has also served as a consultant to the World Bank, Mangalore Stock Exchange, Gujarat Electricity Board, Steel Authority of India Ltd., Gujarat Heavy Chemicals Ltd. etc.

== Awards and recognitions ==
Dholakia was awarded the Padma Shri for Literature and Education in 2007. In 2008, Dholakia was conferred the Bharat Asmita National Award by the Honorable Chief Justice of India. In 2006, he was honoured by the Association of Indian Americans in North America (AIANA) at the World Gujarati Conference in New Jersey for his Visionary Leadership and Achievements in business education. Global Associations of Business Schools have honoured Dholakia for his sterling contribution in the field of management education. The Global Foundation for Management Education (GFME), jointly formed by the Associations of American and European Business Schools, has nominated Dholakia as a Member of the Board of GFME representing Asia. He has won the Best Professor Award for teaching in Post Graduate Program in IIM Ahmedabad.

== Personal life ==
Dr. Bakul Dholakia's wife Sudha completed her master's degree in economics from The Maharaja Sayajirao University of Baroda in 1974; they met for the first time in Baroda University and tied the wedding knot in 1975. Their elder daughter Jigisha after completing her post-graduation in India has settled in Canada. Their younger daughter Purvi has also moved to Canada recently and completed a Post-Graduate Management Program from the University of the Fraser Valley. Currently, Purvi is working in a consultancy company in Burnaby.

== Bibliography ==
Dholakia is the author of 12 books, 25 monographs and more than 50 research papers and over 30 case notes published in professional journals in India and abroad.

=== Books ===
Dholakia has authored/co-authored the following 12 books:

1. Theory of Economic Growth and Technical Progress : An Introduction – Macmillan India Ltd., New Delhi; 1998 (Co-Author)
2. Economic Management and Planning: Case Studies of Selected Commonwealth Countries – Management & Training Services Division, Commonwealth Secretariat, 1994 (Co-Author)
3. Fresh Water Aquaculture in India – Oxford & IBH Publishing Company, New Delhi; 1993 (Co-Author)
4. Fishery Sector of India – Oxford & IBH Publishing Company, New Delhi; 1991 (Co-Author)
5. Regional Energy Demand Model and Analysis – Oxford & IBH Publishing Company, New Delhi; 1991 (Co-Author)
6. Energy Demand for Agriculture in India in the Year 2000 – Oxford & IBH Publishing Company, New Delhi; 1991 (Co-Author)
7. Brackish Water Aquaculture Development in India : Status and tasks ahead – Concept Publishing Company, New Delhi; 1987 (Co-Editor)
8. The Economics of Housing in India – National Buildings Organisation and UN Regional Housing Centre, ESCAP, New Delhi; 1982
9. Models of Economic Growth – University Book Production Board, Ahmedabad; 1979. (Co-Author)
10. The Changing Efficiency of Public Enterprises in India – Somaiya Publications, Bombay; 1980.
11. Principles of Macroeconomics – Tata Mcgraw Hill, Delhi; 1979 (Co Author: Dr. C. Rangarajan).
12. The Sources of Economic Growth in India – Good Companions, Baroda; 1974.

=== Monographs ===
Dholakia has authored/co-authored the following Monographs:

1. The Changing Efficiency of Public Enterprises in India – A Study in Growth Accounting, sponsored by the Indian Institute of Management, Ahmedabad; (1978).
2. The Economics of Housing in India, sponsored by the National Buildings Organisation, Ministry of Works and Housing, Government of India; (1980).
3. Economic Analysis of the Performance of Public Enterprises in India: Case Studies of Four Enterprises. This project report constituted a part of the wider study of the Performance Determinants of Public Enterprises sponsored by the World Bank; (1981).
4. The Comparative Economics of Alternative Uses of Gas in Gujarat, sponsored by Gujarat Electricity Board; (1982).
5. Behaviour of Capital Output Ratios in Indian Economy, sponsored by the Planning Commission, Government of India; (1983).
6. The Performance Appraisal of Gujarat Water Resources Development Corporation, sponsored by the Government of Gujarat; (1983).
7. Management Information System for Public Distribution, sponsored by the Ministry of Civil Supplies, Government of India; (1984). (Co author)
8. Total Factor Productivity As A Measure of Public Sector Enterprise Performance : Concept and Case Studies, sponsored by the Economic Development Institute of the World Bank; (1985).
9. Market Study for Outboard Motors, sponsored by Shri Ram Fibres Limited; (1985). (Co author)
10. Command Area Development : An in depth Evaluation Study of Kosi Project, sponsored by the Ministry of Water Resources Development, Government of India; (1985). (Co author)
11. Brackish Water Aquaculture Development Project, Part I & Part II, sponsored by the Ministry of Agriculture and Rural Development, Government of India; (1986). (Co author)
12. Command Area Development Programme : An in depth Evaluation Study of Tawa Project, sponsored by the Ministry of Water Resources Development, Government of India; (1986). (Co author)
13. Lakshadweep Fisheries Development Corporation : Viability and Strategy, sponsored by the Lakshadweep Administration, Union Territory of Lakshadweep; (1986). (Co author)
14. Study of Health Care Financing in India, sponsored by the Asian Development Bank, Manila; (1987). (Co author)
15. Development Strategy for Outboard Motors : A Techno economic Approach, sponsored by Bajaj Auto Limited; (1987). (Co author)
16. Energy Demand for Agriculture in India in the Year 2000, sponsored by the advisory board on Energy, Government of India; (1988). (Co author)
17. Regional Energy Demand Models and Analysis for Gujarat, Kerala and Rajasthan, sponsored by the advisory board on Energy, Government of India; (1988). (Co author)
18. India Fishery Sector Study, sponsored by the World Bank through Ministry of Food Processing Industries, Government of India; (1989). (Co author)
19. In depth Case Studies of Tuna Fishing Companies in India, sponsored by Marine Products Export Development Authority, Government of India; (1989). (Co author)
20. Evaluation Study of Fish Farmers' Development Agency Programme For Fresh Water Aquaculture, sponsored by the Ministry of Agriculture, Government of India; (1990). (Co author)
21. Reorganisation of NTPC: Diagnostic Study and Recommendations, sponsored by National Thermal Power Corporation; (1991). (Co author)
22. Forecast of Domestic Demand for Cement in Indian Economy (VIII & IX Plan Period), sponsored by the Cement Manufacturers' Association; (1994). (Co-author).
23. Revised Forecast of Domestic Demand for Cement in India (VIII & IX Plan Period), sponsored by the Cement Manufacturers' Association; (1995). (Co-author).
24. Forecast of Domestic Demand for Cement in India Based on End-Use Method (VIII & IX Plan Period), sponsored by the Cement Manufacturers' Association; (1995). (Co-author).
25. Redevelopment of GSTC Mill Sites in Ahmedabad: A Pre-Feasibility Study of Marketing & Financial Aspects, sponsored by The World Bank, October 1996 (Co-author).

=== Research ===
Dholakia has been the author/co-author of the following Research Papers published in professional journals, edited volumes or periodicals:

1. `The Interest Elasticity of Demand for Cash and the Relationship Between Income Velocity and the Rate of Interest', Journal of the MS University of Baroda, Vol. 22, No.2, July 1973.
2. `Shape of the Price Consumption Curve and Behaviour of the Elasticity of Demand', Vishleshan, Vol.I, No.3, September 1975 (co author).
3. 'Empirical Test of the Marginal Productivity Theory of Wages – The Case of Indian Industries', Indian Economic Journal, Vol. 23, No. 5, Conference Number, December 1975 (Co author).
4. 'Alternative Concepts of Elasticity of Demand and Their Inter relationships', Journal of the MS University of Baroda, Vol. 24, No. 2, December 1975.
5. 'Determinants of Worker Rate Differentials Among States', Economic Times, 3 January 1976 (Co author).
6. 'Determinants of Inter Industry Wage Structure in India', Indian Journal of Industrial Relations, Vol. 11, No. 4, April 1976.
7. 'Behaviour of Income Shares in a Developing Economy The Indian Experience', Indian Economic Journal, Vol. 23, No. 4, April June 1976.
8. 'Effect of Recession on the Trends in Industrial Growth and Structure, Economic Times, 11 & 12 June 1976 (Co author).
9. 'District Income Differentials in Maharashtra', Economic Times, 14 August 1976 (Co author).
10. 'Factors Influencing the Interstate Differentials in Female Participation Rate', Vishleshan, Vol.II, No. 3, September 1976 (co author).
11. 'Economic Growth and Environmental Deterioration Some Aspects of Their Inter relationship', Artha Vikas, Vol.12, No.2, July December 1976.
12. 'Regional Wage Differentials in Indian Manufacturing', Economic Times, 10 November 1976 (Co author).
13. 'Sources of Output Growth in Indian Iron and Steel Industry', Indian Journal of Industrial Relations, Vol. 12, No.3, January 1977.
14. 'Measurement of Capital Input and Estimation of Time Series Production Functions in Indian Manufacturing', Indian Economic Journal, Vol. 24, No. 3, January March 1977.
15. 'Growth of Factor Inputs and Total Factor Productivity in Public Sector Enterprises in India', Vikalpa, Vol. 2, No.2, January 1977.
16. 'Technical Progress and Linear Homogeneous Production Function', Vishleshan, Vol. 3, No.2, January 1977.
17. 'Regional Productivity, Disparities in Organised Manufacturing Sector', Economic Times, 12 August 1977 (Co author).
18. 'Report on Income Distribution in India', Indian Economic Journal, Vol.25, No. 2, October December 1977.
19. 'Interstate Variations in Female Labour Force Participation Rates in India – An Analysis of the 1971 Census Data', The Indian Journal of Labour Economics, Vol. 20, No. 4, January 1978.
20. 'Relative Performance of Public and Private Manufacturing Enterprises in India : Total Factor Productivity Approach', Economic and Political Weekly, Vol. XIII, No. 8, 25 February 1978.
21. 'Urban Rural Income Differentials in India : Inter regional Analysis', Indian Journal of Industrial Relations, Vol. 14, No.2, October 1978 (Co author).
22. 'Wage Structure in Consumer Goods and Capital Goods Industries in India', The Indian Journal of Labour Economics, Vol. XXI, No. 4(ii), January 1979.
23. 'Report on Income Distribution in India', Indian Economic Journal, Vol. 26, Nos.4 5, April June 1979.
24. 'Giffen's Paradox A Comment on the Recent Controversy', Indian Economic Journal, Vol. 26, No.4 5, April June 1979 (Co author).
25. 'Trends in the Economic Efficiency of Indian Railways', Lok Udyog, Vol. 14, No. 1, April 1980.
26. 'State Income Inequalities and Interstate Variations in the Growth of Real Capital Stock', Economic and Political Weekly, Vol. 5, No. 38, 20 September 1980 (co author).
27. 'Curriculum for Training on Evaluation of Public Enterprise Performance : Special Issues and Problems', Institute of Public Enterprise Journal, April June 1982, Vol.5, No.2
28. 'Improving Public Enterprise Performance Through Management Development', Chapter 18 in Management Development and Training in Public Enterprises, Edited by Mishra and Ravishankar, Ajanta Books International, Delhi, 1983.
29. 'Performance Evaluation of Public Enterprises : Some Issues Relating to Evaluation Criteria and Information Needs', Chapter 4 in Public Enterprises in India, edited by Sankar, Mishra and Ravishankar, Himalaya Publishing House, Bombay, March 1983.
30. 'Economic Development Problems in India : Agriculture Industry Relations', VIIIth World Economic Congress, International Economic Association, December 1986.
31. 'Income tax Concessions : Implications for Equity and Growth of Tax Base'. Economic and Political Weekly, Vol.22, No.29, 18 July 1987 (co author).
32. 'Industrial Sickness in India : Magnitude and Identification Criteria' Decision, Vol.15, Nos. 3 & 4, July & October 1988.
33. 'Inter Industry Tables for Gujarat : Methodology and Estimates'. Quarterly Bulletin of Economics and Statistics, Vol. XXVIII, No.4, October December 1988. (Co author)
34. 'Socio economic Objectives of Public Distribution System in India'. Nirnay, Vol. 3, No. 4, December 1988.
35. 'Industrial Sickness in India : Need for Comprehensive Identification Criteria'. Vikalpa, Vol. 14, No. 2, April June 1989.
36. 'Energy Demand Forecast For Agriculture in India' Economic and Political Weekly, Vol.15, No.52, December 1990 (Co author).
37. 'Regional Energy Demand Modelling: Some Lessons in Large scale Data Handling and Methodology', Chapter 13 in Modelling and Analysis of Large Systems, Oxford & IBH Publishing Co., New Delhi; 1991 (Co author).
38. `Modernisation of Agriculture and Economic Growth: The Indian Experience', CDS Occasional Paper No.9, Centre For Development Studies. University of Glasgow, 1991 (Co author).
39. `India's Economic Crisis: Nature and Remedies', Vikalpa, Vol.16, No.3, July September 1991.
40. 'Modernisation of Agriculture and Economic Development : The Indian Experience', Farm & Business – The Journal of the Caribbean Agro-Economic Society, Vol. 1, No. 1, March 1992 (Co-author).
41. 'Technical Progress in Indian Agriculture: Temporal Analysis', Vikalpa, Vol. 17, No.2 April June 1992 (Co author).
42. 'Energy Planning in India : Relevance of Regional Planning for National Policy', Energy Policy, September 1992 (Co author).
43. 'Issues in Strategy for Export Promotion : An Inter-Industry Analysis', Economic & Political Weekly, Vol. 27, No. 48, November 1992 (Co-author).
44. 'Growth of Total Factor Productivity in Indian Agriculture', Indian Economic Review, Vol. 28, No. 1, January–June 1993 (Co-author).
45. 'Input Output Tables for Rajasthan : Methodology and Estimates', Journal of Income & Wealth, Vol. 14, No. 2, July 1993 (Co author).
46. 'Malaysia's Privatisation Programme', Vikalpa, Vol. 19, No. 3, July–September 1994 (Co-author).
47. 'Total Factor Productivity Growth in Indian Manufacturing', Economic & Political Weekly, Vol. 29, No. 53, 31 December 1994 (Co-author).
48. 'Macroeconomic Analysis of Union Budget 1995–96', Vikalpa, Vol.20, No.2, April–June 1995.
49. 'Total Factor Productivity Growth in Indian Industry', Economic & Political Weekly, Vol. 30, No. 28, 15 July 1995 (Co-author).
50. 'Some Aspects of Value Added Tax in Indian Economy', Ahmedabad Chartered Accountants' Journal, Vol. 19, No.4, July 1995.
51. 'Functional Distribution of National Income in India', Economic & Political Weekly, Vol.31, No.4, 27 January 1996.
52. 'Macroeconomic Analysis of Union Budget 1996–97', Vikalpa, Vol. 21, No.3, July–September 1996.
53. 'Impact of Economic Liberalisation on the Growth of Indian Agriculture,' Agricultural Development Paradigm for the Ninth Plan Under New Economic Environment. Bhupat M. Desai (Ed.). New Delhi : Oxford & IBH Publishing Co. Pvt. Ltd., (1997), pp. 122–136.
54. 'The Agricultural Development Corporation (Kenya),' Strategic Management of Public Enterprises in Developing Countries. S. Ramnarayan & I.M. Pandey (Eds.). New Delhi : Vikas Publishing House Pvt. Ltd., (1997), pp. 177–222.
55. 'National Paper Corporation of Sri Lanka,' Strategic Management of Public Enterprises in Developing Countries. S. Ramnarayan & I.M. Pandey (Eds.). New Delhi : Vikas Publishing House Pvt. Ltd., (1997), pp. 239–277.
56. 'Macroeconomic Assessment of Voluntary Disclosure of Income Scheme (VDIS) 1997', The Economic Times, 15 January 1998.
57. 'Input Output Tables for Kerala : Methodology and Estimates', IIMA Working Paper Series, No. 747, May 1988 (Co author).
58. 'Sources of India's Economic Growth', IIMA Working Paper Series, No.1288, December 1995.
59. 'Macroeconomic Analysis of Union Budget 1997–98', IIMA Working Paper Series, No.1377, June 1997.

=== Cases and technical notes ===
Dholakia has authored the following Cases and Technical Notes used in MBA programme as well as various Executive Development Programmes conducted by the Indian Institute of Management, Ahmedabad.

International cases

1. Management of Economic Policy Reforms in Kenya, 1995
2. Tenaga Nasional Berhad (Malaysia), 1994
3. Export Promotion Strategy and Trade Policy Reforms in Sri Lanka, 1993.
1. Economic Policy Reforms : Mauritian Experience, 1992 (Co author)
2. Role of Tourism Sector in Mauritian Economy, 1992 (Co author)
3. National Electricity Board of Malaysia (A), 1991.
4. Urban Development Through Corporatism: The Case of Toronto Harbourfront; 1991 (Co author).
5. Economic Planning in a Consistency Framework: The Malaysian Experience; 1991 (Co author).
6. Agricultural Development Corporation (Kenya); 1989 (Co author).
7. National Paper Corporation of Sri Lanka; 1989 (Co author).

Cases on Indian Industries

1. Southern Sea Foods Private Limited (Case on Export Marketing); 1990.
2. SFP Fisheries Limited (Case on Project Rehabilitation); 1990.
3. Jaypee Rewa Cement Project (Case on Social Cost Benefit Analysis); 1989.
4. Fisheries Private Limited (Case on Project Appraisal and Project Rehabilitation); 1989 (Co-author).
5. Laktuna :Marketing of Canned Tuna Produced in Lakshadweep; 1987 (co author).
6. Diversification of Dinesh Fibres : An Assessment of Market for Outboard Motors Project (Case on Demand Forecasting); 1987 (Co author).

Other Cases and Technical Notes

1. Brackish Water Aquaculture Development in Tamil Nadu (Case); 1987 (co author).
2. Growth and Structural Change in Indian Economy, 1982.
3. Methods of Forecasting Demand for Industrial Products, 1979.
4. Marxian Analysis of the Future of Capitalism, 1977 (co author).
5. Capitalism and the Classical Economic System, 1977.
6. Ecology, Environmental Deterioration and Limits to Growth, 1976.
7. India's Export Policy, 1976.
8. Fifth Five Year Plan – Some Basic Issues, 1976.
9. Estimates of National Income in India by Industry of Origin A Note on Methodology and Interpretation of Data, 1976 (Co author).
10. Main Features of National Supply Management System for Essential Commodities, 1984.
11. Inter commodity Differences in National Supply Management System, 1984.
12. Socio economic Objectives of National Supply Management System, 1984.
13. Main Issues in Commodity Planning, 1984.
14. Food Budget and Requirement of Public Distribution System in Gujarat (Case), 1984.
15. Allocation of Foodgrains from Central Pool to Various States, 1984.
16. Yashwant Sahakari Pani Purvatha Yojna Lift Irrigation Society (B), (Case), 1984.
17. Review of Supply Management System Interstate Variations, 1983.
