= National Competition Policy =

National Competition Policy may refer to:

- National Competition Policy (India)
- National Competition Policy (Australia)
