= Umar Javeed, Sukarma Thapar, Aaqib Javeed vs. Google LLC and Ors. =

Court case against Google in India over the abuse of dominance

- Court: Competition Commission of India
- Citation: Case 39 of 2018 CCI.GOV.IN

Case history
- Prior action: Prima facie order passed in 2018 against Google: Mandatory pre-installation of all Google Mobile Services (GMS) suite under MADAs amounts to imposing an unfair condition on device manufacturers. Leveraging of Google's dominance in the Google Play store to protect relevant markets such as online general search contrary to Section 4.(2).(e) of the Competition Act, 2002. Google's contested conduct can contribute to its continued dominance in the online search marketplace. While resulting in denial of market access for competing Search engine applications in contravention of Section 4.(2) of the Act.

Holding
- Penalty Order: Google is fined Rs. 1337.76 crore by the Indian Competition Commission for engaging in anti-competitive competitive business practices through Android mobile devices in Indian markets. (PRESS RELEASE No. 55/2022-23)

Laws applied
- Competition Act, 2002

Keywords
- Google; Android; anti-competitive practices competition law

Umar Javeed, Sukarma Thapar, Aaqib Javeed vs. Google LLC and Ors. is a 2019 court case in which Google and Google India Private Limited were accused of abuse of dominance in the Android operating system in India. The Competition Commission of India found that Google abused its dominant position by requiring device manufacturers wishing to pre-install apps to adhere to a compatibility standard on Android.

== Plaintiffs ==
In 2018, Aaqib Javeed was briefly an intern with the Competition Commission of India, New Delhi while studying law at the University of Kashmir. He was due to graduate in 2019.

Sukarma Thapar was working as a research associate at Competition Commission of India. She postgraduated from the NALSAR in 2016.

Umar Javeed was working as a research associate at the Competition Commission of India, New Delhi. In 2014, he graduated from the University of Kashmir.

== Allegations ==
Google has signed mobile application distribution agreements (MADAs) with original equipment manufacturers (OEMs) of Android. Under this agreement OEMs of Android were required to pre-install all the Google Applications (GApps) and Google Services in Android devices before shipping/distributing them to the Indian market.

Google Apps are smartphone applications and Google Services are proprietary application programming interface (API) services, collectively referred to as Google mobile services (GMS) which includes a number of bundled apps and services: Google Play, Google Search, YouTube, Google Maps, Gmail, Google Drive, Google Chrome, Google Play Music, Google Play Movies, Hangouts, Google Duo and Google Photos. APIs are non-graphical user interface (GUI) services which run in background, they function as messengers that allow software to talk to software inside the system and on outside, they function as building blocks that allow number of systems, data locations and digital devices to communicate with one another in the digital network. Some of the Google APIs (such as Google Maps APIs, Play Games API, Location APIs, Cloud drive APIs, etc.) and other APIs which are exclusively available through Google Play Services are part of GMS.

The GMS is proprietary of Google. Unlike Android they are not licensed via open source and released into public domain. GMS is a non-free suite. The source code is the base of a program and the central point of control. Only the owner of proprietary software has the right to access the source code of the program. It cannot be used by other parties without negotiations with Google. Android operating system which is a licensable smart mobile operating system. Open-source software is free to use, develop, modify and redistribute.

For OEMs to get a GMS licence from Google in order to install them in Android products such as smartphones they are required by Google to pre-load all the Google apps and services contained in the bundle as pre-installed software. Google does not allow OEMs to pick and choose from the applications and services contained in the bundle. While signing a MADA was optional, original equipment manufacturers are stipulated to pre-install all Google's Android applications and services in order to obtain any part of GMS. It was argued that this hinders the development of rival mobile applications and services in the market.

Before signing a MADA, OEMs had to enter into an anti-fragmentation agreement (AFA) with Google, which prevented them from developing and marketing an Android Fork on other devices. This restricted access to potentially superior versions of the Android operating system.

The MADAs and AFA agreements made it possible for Google to promote and monetize YouTube as an online video platform. This makes Google AdSense the winner takes all in the play by leveraging YouTube's dominance in the advertising market. The unavailability of YouTube Premium ad-free services in the Indian market has a direct impact on Google's AdSense revenue. YouTube's content is distributed on more than 300 million Android smartphones in India, and 85 percent is consumed by Android smartphones having MADAs and AFA agreements.

=== Google's counterarguments ===
It was argued that the alleged restrictions and conditions in this case did not cause foreclosure in the India markets and do not fall in the anti-competitive agreements of The Competition Act, 2002, hence are not anti-competitive practices. Some of the arguments are as follows:

- Google has not laid any requirements as alleged for OEMs to sign agreements of mobile application distribution agreements. Such agreements are optional for OEMs who wish to pre-install GMS on their products - Android devices. In exchange for a free of cost licence to GMS, the OEM agrees to place the Google Search widget, the Play icon, and a folder with a selection of other Google apps such as Chrome, Google Play Store etc. on the default home screen. (See Case document p. 10, p.11)
- The alleged pre-installation of GMS as preloaded don't restrict the OEMs of Android to install other competitors apps and services in the products (such as smartphones).
- The users of the smart mobile phones of Android can install other apps and can also disable pre-loaded apps installed through GMS suite.
- Google has laid down the requirements of anti-fragmentation agreements, because if Android source code is modified or rebuilt beyond its limits it will create an imbalance in the whole ecosystem.

== Outcome ==
The Competition Commission of India ordered an investigation into abuse of dominance allegations against Google:

"In this regard, the Competition Commission of India is of the prima-facie opinion that the mandatory pre-installation of the entire Google Mobile Services suite under MADAs amounts to the imposition of an unfair condition on the device manufacturers and thereby in contravention of Section 4(2)(a)(i) of the Act. It also amounts to prima facie leveraging of Google's dominance in Play Store to protect the relevant market such as Google Search (Online Search Engine) in contravention of Section 4(2)(e) of the Competition Act, 2002. Mobile search has emerged as a key gateway for users to access information and Android is a key delivery channel for mobile search. Search Engines have Data-driven effects. To enhance search engine optimization and the Search algorithm, it requires enough data, which in turn requires a sufficient number of queries from Users who rely more and more on mobile search."

The impugned conduct of Google may help perpetuate its dominance in the online search market through Google Search while resulting in denial of market access for competing search apps in contravention of Section 4(2)(c) of the Competition Act, 2002. The Commission warranted an in-depth investigation against the opposite parties of this case. The plea submitted by Google that MADAs pre-installation conditions are not exclusive or exclusionary, can also be properly examined during the investigation. It was held Google has a dominant position in the mobile operating system market. Google's Android holds 80 per cent of India's mobile operating system market.

== Timeline ==
In December 2018 and January 2019, Google submitted its submission to the Indian Competition Commission in both confidential and non-confidential versions.

In June 2019, the Competition Commission of India sent letters to smartphone OEM inquiring as to the terms of their agreement with Google LLC and Google India Private Limited to verify if Google has imposed restrictions on their use of the company's mobile apps in the last eight years from 2011.

In July 2019, the former senior member of the Competition Commission of India told Reuters, "The developments will be watched eagerly as the case involves many intricacies and its implications will be world over".

In October 2022, the Competition Commission of India fined Google Rs. 1337.76 crore on for engaging in anti-competitive practices in Indian markets. Google has been given 30 days to submit the necessary financial information and accompanying paperwork. This was followed up by another fine of $113 million as well as an order for Google to start using third-party payment processors for in-app purchases and purchases in the Play Market.

== Basic concept in this case ==
Data is treated as a non-monetary consideration under competition law. Online platforms may claim that their services are free for users, however, they are not because customers provide their data in exchange for the services. User data allows online platforms to improve their products and services while also providing advertisers with highly targeted advertising options. App stores, such as Google Play (Android), App Store (iOS), and Windows Store, are online digital distribution platforms that connect users of smart mobile devices with mobile application developers.

Online platforms, according to the European Commission, are software-based facilities offering two or multi-sided markets where providers and users of content, commodities, and services can meet. Online platforms, according to the German Monopolies Commission, are intermediaries that bring together multiple groups of users in order for them to interact economically or socially. Hence, Android is a multi-sided platform since it brings together more than two distinct groups, such as app developers, phone manufacturers, mobile carriers, customers, and app suppliers, who all benefit from their mutual interaction.

=== Mobile operating systems ===
The three main mobile operating systems (OS) and their types:

Type A: In this type the manufacturer-built proprietary operating systems where the operating system developer (the owner) is also the hardware manufacturer.

- Apple iOS: The iPhone operating system from Apple, derived from Mac OSX. Apple did not support the ability to develop third-party applications till the release of iOS 2.0 in July 2008. It is one of the most popular smartphone devices and enjoys the highest operating profits in the U.S., due to its integrated approach (end-to-end services). After July 2008, Apple IOS has app store and third-party developers. The value of the developer's contribution, is backbone to a program in this transition period of technological change," Apple paid out nearly $50 billion in revenue to developers".
- BlackBerry OS
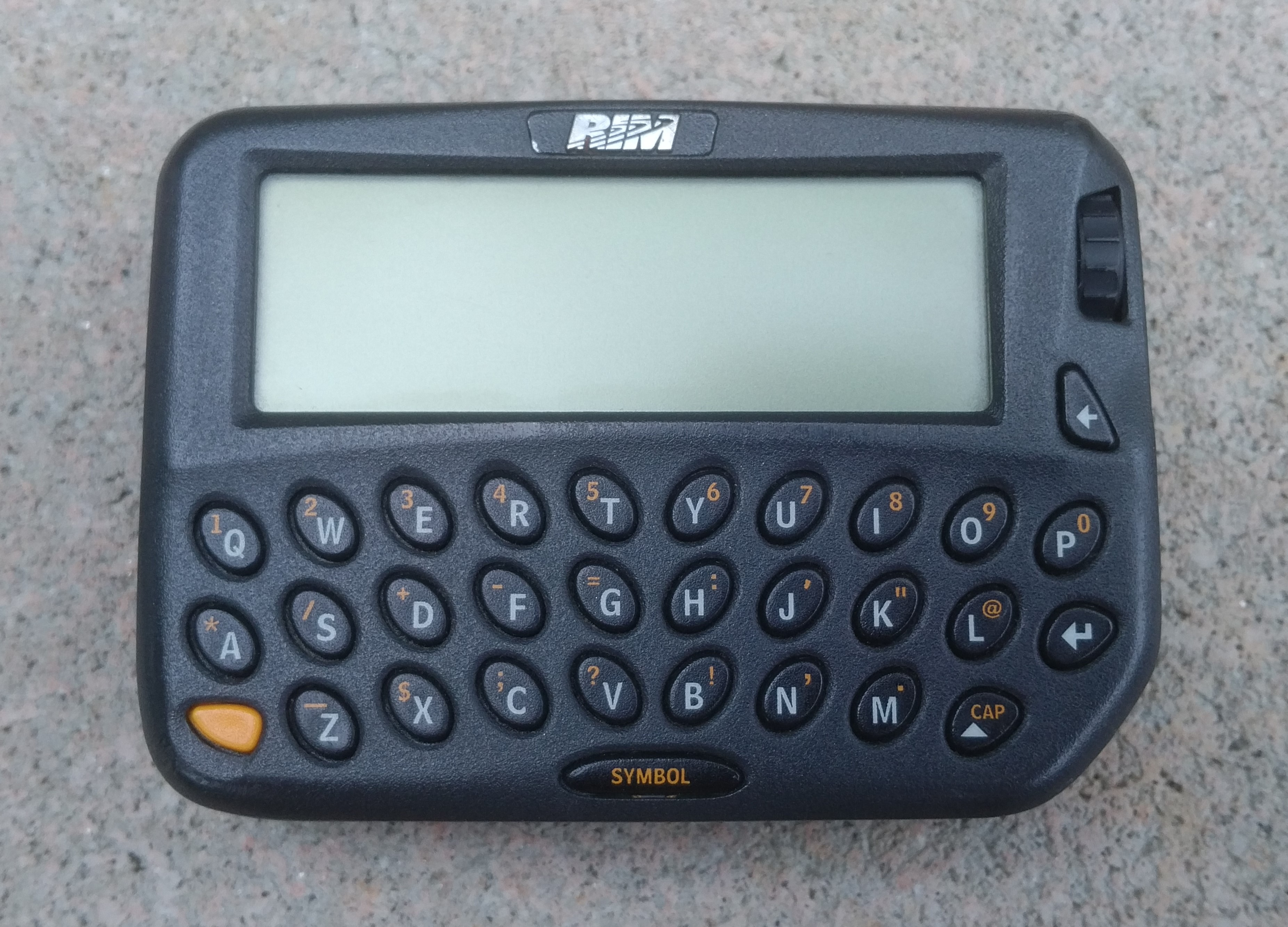
  The RIM Blackberry was a sensation in the early 2000s
  Originally made for business purposes and the first smartphone OS, which brought the smartphone to the daily life of people, RIM Blackberry was a sensation in the early 2000s. But this platform is also losing its market share because of strong competition. It's a closed-source proprietary system. RIM App World was launched in April 2009, and has seen a rapidly falling market share in the last four years.

Type B: Third-party proprietary operating systems where the operating system developer (the owner) will license its operating system, usually for a fee, to third-party hardware manufacturers original equipment manufacturers (OEMs). In this method, similar to Microsoft's personal computer operating system (Windows) model, the devices will have a consistent appearance, interface and behaviour. There is little scope for customization of the operating system by the OEMs.

- Microsoft Windows Phone (Mobile)

Type C: Free and open source operating systems where the operating system developer (owner) will release the operating system via the open source licence method. Open source operating systems are developed by a company, a group of companies or a community of developers. Customization of the operating system is usually allowed to a certain degree (within the parameters of the licence agreement).

- Android This is a software platform and operating system for mobile devices based on Linux kernel and developed by Google but later on by Open Handset Alliance (OHA). Its native language is Java which is the officially supported language. In this platform applications can be written in other languages also but later on it is compiled to ARM native code.
- Symbian

== See also ==
- Criticism of Google § Android
- Competition Commission of India § Notable cases
- Microsoft Corp. v. Commission
