= Housing crisis =

Acute failures in the housing market

An affordable housing crisis or housing crisis is either a widespread housing shortage in places where people want to live or a financial crisis in the housing market. Housing crises can contribute to homelessness and housing insecurity. They are difficult to address, because they are a complex "web of problems and dysfunctions" with many contributing factors, including structural causes like government policy, and proximate causes like housing costs rising faster than household income.

There is an ongoing decades-long increasing trend of cities around the world facing housing crises. Some notable examples of financial crises in the housing market are the American subprime mortgage crisis in 2007–2008 and the Chinese property sector crisis beginning in 2020.

The consensus in economic research is that housing shortages are caused by supply constraints such as zoning regulations, NIMBY policies and rising construction costs.

== Global ==
As per 2026, in much of the world, incomes are too low to afford basic formal housing, as housing expenses have increased faster than wages in many cities, especially since the 2008 financial crisis. In some places, this leads to informal settlement in slums or shantytowns, while in others such informal settlements are prohibited. Even regions that are not experiencing an overall housing shortage may experience shortages for specific segments of the population, such as in affordable housing for very-low income populations or permanent supportive housing for those with disabilities.

=== Causes ===
Economists debate the causes of the crisis. In 2022, economists Christian Hilber and Olivier Schöni found that the primary strand in this debate argues that supply constraints such as land use restrictions prevented the meeting of growing housing demand, resulting in higher housing costs. Others strands in the debate found causes in macroeconomic factors, financing conditions, and poor forecasting of expected prices. People's poor earnings also contribute to the global crisis.

According to research, overly restrictive zoning drives up housing prices by limiting the number of areas where construction is allowed. Studies have found, for example, that restrictive zoning can make homes more than 50% more expensive than the actual cost to build them. Building codes have also been criticized for exacerbating the housing crisis by raising the cost of new housing.

A study by Moody's Analytics found that the main causes of the crisis also included shortages of labor and materials. The COVID-19 pandemic may also have exacerbated the crisis. In some places, refugee crises are a contributing factor.

Although major cities around the world face housing shortages, substantial variation exists across countries and across planning systems. Among developed countries, for example, cities in Japan have relatively abundant and affordable housing for their size, which some have attributed to nationalized control of zoning (by reducing the power of local governments to block new construction projects) and easy and fast permitting for housing construction. Most English-speaking countries, on the other hand, stand out for planning systems that enable NIMBY obstruction of housing, with prices rising and housing falling into shortage as a result. Developed European countries, which favor higher density construction than Anglophone countries, have followed an intermediate path between these two.

=== Impacts ===
Housing crises have contributed to social unrest in cities around the world. They have especially hurt the finances of Millennials and Generation Z, who entered a more competitive housing market, resulting in paying a higher proportion of income towards housing costs. Politico suggests that in many countries this has allowed populist politicians to stoke anti-immigrant sentiment among younger voters and has resulted in a generation more skeptical of the ability of democracy to deliver results.

== National ==
=== Australia ===
Housing in Australia’s major cities is among the least affordable in the world. As of 2025/2026, Sydney is the second most unaffordable housing market in the world.

Some organizations claim that "It is more than a housing crisis, it has become a full-scale national disaster" or that the crisis "isn't just a housing emergency - it’s a national emergency".

In 2026, the prime minister of Australia Anthony Albanese said that more than anything else, housing supply hinges on housing supply.

=== Germany ===
The chart shows the percentage of the population living in overcrowded living arrangements in France, Germany and Italy and the European average.

With only 46.7% in 2022, German homeownership is traditionally low compared to other countries due to the high quantity of subsidized or rent-regulated housing. The German government does not deduct mortgage interest payments from taxes. In the 2000s, Germany reduced government subsidies for homeownership. In more recent years though, also in Germany, the percentage of people living in overcrowded living arrangements, against EU averages, has steeply risen.

=== India ===
According to a 2012 report by the National Buildings Organisation (NBO), the shortage of housing units in urban areas was estimated to be 18.78 million. The shortfall is particularly acute for households belonging to the Economically Weaker Section (total household income does not exceed 300,000 rupees), with a shortage of 10.55 million units, as well as the Lower Income Group (total household income is between 300,000 and 600,000 rupees), with a shortage of 7.41 million units. The Middle Income Group and above (households with a total annual income exceeding 600,000 rupees) face a shortfall of 0.82 million units.

=== Mexico ===
Mexico's housing shortage has been estimated to be about 9 million units, a gap that traces back to the country's shift toward market-based housing finance in the 1990s, when the government moved away from direct construction and toward lending through private developers. This privatization model produced two main issues: input-market concentration and unoccupied housing stock. On production, key materials like cement are controlled by firms with substantial market power and virtually no competition, and price increases from producers like CEMEX have forced local governments to scale back public infrastructure spending. Housing prices nationwide rose 247 percent between 2005 and 2021, with every state seeing prices more than double. On supply, the mass-production model of the 2000s and 2010s built housing far from urban centers where land was cheaper, leading to high vacancy: INFONAVIT's own 2011–2015 financial plan found that a quarter of units it built between 2006 and 2009 sat vacant, largely due to their remote locations. As of 2025, Moody's has warned that Infonavit's homebuilding arm faces a difficult path toward its six-year target of 500,000 homes. The ratings agency pointed to two structural constraints: construction materials costs have climbed sharply, and developers have struggled to secure funding through both bank loans and capital markets.

Along the northern border, the nearshoring boom has pushed some manufacturing firms to rent or construct housing directly for their workers, a response to average manufacturing wages of roughly 12,000 pesos a month, too low to afford housing through conventional channels even as factory-driven demand outpaces local supply. A similar dynamic plays out in Mexico City, where short-term rental platforms like Airbnb have become a fixture of the housing market rather than a marginal one. The city government has leaned into this by treating platforms as an effective method for tax collection, even as some residents and local officials have raised concerns about what a growing short-term rental presence could mean for long-term housing availability. Political scientist Viri Rios has disputed narratives that place most of the blame on gentrification, writing that "the reality is that, with or without gringos, housing in Mexico has become enormously more expensive," and pointing instead to high construction costs and public policy that has failed to keep pace with demand.

=== The Netherlands ===
The Netherlands is grappling with a long-standing and escalating housing crisis characterized by a persistent deficit in dwelling availability. As of mid-2025, the country faced a shortage of approximately 396,000 homes, representing around 4.8 percent of the total housing stock, down only slightly from the previous year’s figure of 401,000. If current trends continue, experts forecast that the housing shortfall could swell further to 453,000 homes by 2027, largely due to the rental income impact on housing associations from a social-housing rent freeze.

The strain is most pronounced in urban centers such as Amsterdam, Utrecht, and Rotterdam, where demand fueled by population growth and tight planning regulations has outpaced new construction. Despite governmental targets of constructing 100,000 new homes annually, in 2024 only about 82,000 were added to the housing stock. Moreover, social housing has lagged behind: from 2020 to 2023, only 51 of Netherlands’ 342 municipalities met the goal of allocating at least 30 percent of new builds to social housing, with 34 delivering none at all.

The crisis carries profound societal implications. Young people, in particular, face significant hardship: more than 40 percent of those seeking housing have had to postpone life milestones such as moving in with a partner or starting a family due to housing constraints. Policymakers have attempted to inject relief through mechanisms like the Good Landlordship Act (enacted in 2023) and the Affordable Rent Act (introduced in 2024), which caps rents for mid-priced dwellings at around €1,123 per month and limits annual rent hikes. However, critics argue these measures may hinder housing associations’ ability to invest in new construction and maintenance, compounding the crisis rather than alleviating it.

=== New Zealand ===
Auckland quickly boosted supply and slowed the increase in rents and home prices by loosening constraints on construction. Auckland saw rents grow more slowly than in other parts of the country and more slowly than incomes since it started reforming its housing laws in 2013. As of July 2024, Ryan Greenaway-McGrevy estimated that rents were 28% lower than they would have been without the reforms. Building on Auckland's success, the national government passed a bipartisan upzoning of much of the country's largest cities to allow 3 units and 3 stories on all residential parcels in October 2021.

=== United Kingdom ===
The United Kingdom faces regional shortages of housing, with undersupply and high demand in Southern Britain, relative to more abundant housing in economically depressed areas of Northern Britain.

The UK National Planning Policy Framework uses the "standard formula" to assess local housing need. The formula uses household growth projections, adjusted for affordability Critics of this method say that it does not account for the present backlog of housing. Households that live in poorly maintained or overcrowded accommodations would not be represented in the standard formula. A 2019 report estimates that 4.75 million households in Great Britain are in need of adequate affordable housing.

In the 2019 general election, both major political parties identified the housing gap as an obstacle for the country, and pledged to increase housing supply. The Parliament has a stated target of 300,000 new homes a year by the mid-2020s.

== Financial crisis ==
Another use of the term "housing crisis" refers to financial crises related to the housing sector. Rapid swings and especially declines in housing asset prices can cause shocks to credit markets, the banking sector, and the wider economy.

=== Foreclosure crises ===
Many homebuyers purchase housing on credit in the form of a mortgage, but changing economic conditions can leave them unable to pay back their loans. Guren and McQuade (2020) argue that widespread foreclosures can interact with the housing market to amplify declines in asset prices, leading to prices below levels determined by fundamentals: "When the housing market is hit by a shock that lowers housing demand and induces some foreclosures - for example a drop in employment... the dynamic interactions between falling prices, defaults, and credit constraints keep growing numbers of buyers out of the market. The scarcity of buyers lowers prices, intensifies the buyers’ market, and leads to a downward price-default spiral".

=== Asset cycles and housing crises (financial) ===
In addition to long-run trends driven by fundamentals, house prices are also subject to asset cycles. Economists debate the causes of these cycles, but have studied links to changing beliefs about asset prices, broader economic conditions, credit constraints, and interactions with mortgage lenders. As part of an asset cycle, house prices can rise above levels determined by fundamentals ("Housing bubble"). During a correction, a financial-housing crisis can occur in the context of a downward price-foreclosure spiral. This "price-foreclosure spiral... pushes prices below their long-run level" leading to patterns such as the boom-bust-rebound of the 2000s housing cycle. These foreclosure crises can have significant consequences for the wider economy.

== See also ==
- Affordable housing
- Missing middle housing
- Public housing
- Real estate bubble
- FIRE economy
