= National Association of Street Vendors of India =

National Association of Street Vendors of India (NASVI) is a national federation of Street Vendor's associations across India. The federation pushed to bring a national policy for Street Vendors and played a significant role to pass the law, Protection of Livelihood and Regulation of Street Vending act.

== Aim ==
NASVI works for the protection of livelihood rights of street vendors in India.

== History ==
The federation was organized in 1998 based at Patna and registered in 2003 under Societies Registration Act, 1860.
