= Ministry of Housing and Urban Poverty Alleviation =

Former government ministry of India

- Emblem of India

Agency overview
- Formed: 27 May 2004
- Dissolved: 6 July 2017
- Jurisdiction: Government of India
- Headquarters: New Delhi
- Website: mhupa.gov.in

The Ministry of Housing and Urban Poverty Alleviation was a ministry of the Government of India responsible for urban poverty, housing, and employment programs. It was involved in national policy decisions and coordinates with Indian central ministries, state governments, and central sponsor programs.

On 6 July 2017, the ministry was re-united with the Ministry of Urban Development to form the Ministry of Housing and Urban Affairs.

== History ==
The ministry was first created in 1999 as the "Ministry of Urban Affairs and Poverty Alleviation" and existed alongside the Ministry of Urban Development. On 22 November 1999, the ministry was renamed as the "Ministry of Urban Employment and Poverty Alleviation" and was concerned with generating employment in urban areas. On 27 May 2000, the ministry was merged along with the Ministry of Urban Development and renamed as the "Ministry of Urban Development and Poverty Alleviation".

Following the formation of the First Manmohan Singh ministry on 22 May 2004, the Ministry of Urban Development and Poverty Alleviation was re-bifurcated into the "Ministry of Urban Development" and the "Ministry of Urban Employment and Poverty Alleviation". The Ministry of Urban Employment and Poverty Alleviation was renamed as the "Ministry of Housing and Urban Poverty Alleviation" on 1 June 2006. The ministry was re-merged with the Ministry of Urban Development on 6 July 2017 to form the "Ministry of Urban Affairs".

== Overview ==
The Indian Constitution has allocated responsibility for housing and urban development to the state; and the 74th amendment to the Constitution delegates some responsibility to the local governments. The ministry was responsible for the national capital territory of Delhi and union territories. It also provided finances through federal institutions and allocates resources to the state governments. The ministry supported the country's external housing and urban development assistance programs.

== Divisions ==
The ministry had administrative control over the National Buildings Organisation (NBO) attached office and the Hindustan Prefab Limited (HPL) and Housing and Urban Development Corporation (HUDCO) public sector undertakings. It was also responsible for the following statutory and autonomous bodies:

- Building Materials and Technology Promotion Council (BMTPC)
- Central Government Employees Welfare Housing Organisation (CGEWHO)
- National Cooperative Housing Federation of India (NCHFI)
- Principal Account Office (PAO)

== Sectors for improvement ==
For poverty alleviation programs to be successful, the following sectors should realise improvements: Income generation, health, shelter, education, environment and infrastructure. Environmental Improvement for Urban Slum, Urban Basic Service programs, Nehru Rozgar Yojana, Shelter and Infrastructural facilities, and Low Cost Sanitation Night Shelter are examples of schemes to meet these objectives.

The Ministry had constituted a Committee on Streamlining Approval Procedures for Real Estate Projects (SAPREP) under the chairmanship of Dhanendra Kumar, former chairman of Competition Commission of India. Amongst other things, the concept of single window clearance as advocated by this committee report draw parallels with government's effort towards improving ease of doing business in the country.

== National programs and legislation ==
The Government of India has launched various programs since its independence, such as some of the five-year plans, to alleviate poverty and address the widening income gap, both, amongst the upper and lower classes of society, and amongst the rural and urban parts of the country. For instance, the "Eighth Plan policy guidelines envisage integrated approach to alleviation of urban poverty and servicing the urban poor with basic facilities so that their quality of life improves."

As trends in the Gini coefficient reflect, the income gaps were not as pronounced until the early 1980s, but the situation has been continually getting worse since. Misplaced priorities of the Indian Government and bad planning of subsidy programs is largely responsible for this. Hosting the Commonwealth Games in New Delhi in 2010 that cost the exchequer an approximate ₹110 billion (US$1.1 billion), excluding the price of non-sports related infrastructure, is a case in point.

While newly launched programs like Mahatma Gandhi National Rural Employment Guarantee Act (MNREGA), National Rural Health Mission (NRHM), Food Security Act, Mid-day Meals and Bharat Nirman Yojana have demonstrated success in the initial stages, their performance over the long-run still remains to be seen. The shortsightedness of the Indian government often leads it to launch populist programs that may not necessarily work well. Low-hanging fruit like increasing worker's minimum wage can go a long way in achieving the goal of poverty alleviation, but are yet to be taken up in spite of reminders from leading economists.

On 6 September 2012 the Union Minister, Kumari Selja, introduced the Street Vendors Act, 2014 in the Lok Sabha.

== Cabinet Ministers ==
- Note: MoS, I/C – Minister of State (Independent Charge)

No.	Portrait	Minister (Birth-Death)	Term of office			Political party	Ministry	Prime Minister
No.	Portrait	Minister (Birth-Death)	From	To	Period	Political party	Ministry	Prime Minister
Minister of Urban Affairs and Poverty Alleviation
1		Satyanarayan Jatiya (born 1946); MP for Ujjain	13 October 1999	22 November 1999	40 days	Bharatiya Janata Party	Vajpayee III	Atal Bihari Vajpayee
Minister of Urban Employment and Poverty Alleviation
2		Jagmohan (1927–2021); MP for New Delhi	22 November 1999	26 November 1999	4 days	Bharatiya Janata Party	Vajpayee III	Atal Bihari Vajpayee
3		Sukhdev Singh Dhindsa (born 1936); Rajya Sabha MP for Punjab	26 November 1999	27 May 2000	183 days	Shiromani Akali Dal	Vajpayee III	Atal Bihari Vajpayee
Ministry disestablished during this interval (Note: The ministry's competences were transferred to the Ministry of Urban Development.)
4		Selja Kumari (born 1962); MP for Ambala (MoS, I/C)	23 May 2004	1 June 2006	2 years, 9 days	Indian National Congress	Manmohan I	Manmohan Singh
Minister of Housing and Urban Poverty Alleviation
5		Selja Kumari (born 1962); MP for Ambala (MoS, I/C until 22 May 2009)	1 June 2006	22 May 2009	2 years, 355 days	Indian National Congress	Manmohan I	Manmohan Singh
5		Selja Kumari (born 1962); MP for Ambala (MoS, I/C until 22 May 2009)	28 May 2009	28 October 2012	3 years, 214 days	Indian National Congress	Manmohan II	Manmohan Singh
6		Ajay Maken (born 1964); MP for New Delhi	28 October 2012	16 June 2013	231 days	Indian National Congress	Manmohan II	Manmohan Singh
7		Girija Vyas (1946–2025); MP for Chittorgarh	17 June 2013	26 May 2014	343 days	Indian National Congress	Manmohan II	Manmohan Singh
8		M. Venkaiah Naidu (born 1948); Rajya Sabha MP for Karnataka, till 2016; Rajya Sabha MP for Rajasthan, from 2016	26 May 2014	6 July 2017	3 years, 41 days	Bharatiya Janata Party	Modi I	Narendra Modi
Merged with Ministry of Urban Development to form the Ministry of Housing and Urban Affairs

== Ministers of State ==
No.	Portrait	Minister (Birth-Death)	Term of office			Political party	Ministry	Prime Minister
No.	Portrait	Minister (Birth-Death)	From	To	Period	Political party	Ministry	Prime Minister
1		Babul Supriyo (born 1970); MP for Asansol	9 November 2014	12 July 2016	1 year, 246 days	Bharatiya Janata Party	Modi I	Narendra Modi
2		Rao Inderjit Singh (born 1951); MP for Gurgaon	5 July 2016	6 July 2017	1 year, 1 day	Bharatiya Janata Party	Modi I	Narendra Modi
Merged with Ministry of Urban Development to form the Ministry of Housing and Urban Affairs

== See also ==
- Housing in India
- Illegal housing in India
- Jawaharlal Nehru National Urban Renewal Mission
- Poverty in India
- Slums in India
