= Competition Commission of India =

Competition regulator in India

- भारतीय प्रतिस्पर्धा आयोग
- Emblem of The Government of India

- Logo of the CCI

Commission overview
- Formed: 14 October 2003 (22 years ago)
- Preceding Commission: Monopolies and Restrictive Trade Practices Commission
- Jurisdiction: Republic of India
- Headquarters: Competition Commission of India 9th Floor, Office Block - 1, Kidwai Nagar (East), New Delhi 110023, India.
- Annual budget: 756.19 Crore (for Financial Year 2023–24)
- Minister responsible: Nirmala Sitaraman
- Commission executives: Ravneet Kaur IAS, (Chairperson); Inder Pal Singh Bindra, IRS, (Secretary)
- Website: www.cci.gov.in

The Competition Commission of India (CCI) is the chief national competition regulator in India. It is a statutory body within the Ministry of Corporate Affairs and is responsible for enforcing the Competition Act, 2002 to promote competition and prevent activities that have an appreciable adverse effect on competition in India. The CCI looks into cases and investigates them if the same has a negative impact on competition.

CCI also approves combination under the act so that two merging entities do not overtake the market.

The commission was established on 14 October 2003. It became fully functional in May 2009 with Dhanendra Kumar as its first chairman. The current Chairperson of the CCI is Ravneet Kaur, who was appointed to the role in 2023.

== The Competition Act, 2002 ==
The idea of Competition Commission was conceived and introduced in the form of the Competition Act, 2002 by the Vajpayee government. A need was felt to promote competition and private enterprise especially in the light of 1991 Indian economic liberalisation.

The Competition Act, 2002, as amended by the Competition (Amendment) Act, 2007, follows the philosophy of modern competition laws. The Act prohibits anti-competitive agreements, abuse of dominant position by enterprises and regulates combinations (acquisition, acquiring of control and Merger and acquisition), which causes or likely to cause an appreciable adverse effect on competition within India.

The objectives of the act are sought to be achieved through the Competition Commission of India (CCI), which has been established by the Central Government with effect from 14 October 2003. CCI consists of a chairperson and six members appointed by the Central Government. It is the duty of the commission to eliminate practices having adverse effect on competition, promote and sustain competition, protect the interests of consumers and ensure freedom of trade in the markets of India. The commission is also required to give an opinion on competition issues on a reference received from a statutory authority established under any law and to undertake competition advocacy, create public awareness and impart training on competition issues.

== Objectives ==
"The main objective of competition law is to promote economic efficiency using competition as one of the means of assisting the creation of market responsive to consumer preferences. The advantages of perfect competition are three-fold: allocative efficiency, which ensures the effective allocation of resources, productive efficiency, which ensures that costs of production are kept at a minimum and dynamic efficiency, which promotes innovative practices."

— Supreme Court of India Judgment in Civil Appeal No. 7999 of 2010 pronounced on 9 September 2010

=== Preamble to the Competition Act ===
An Act to provide, keeping in view of the economic development of the country, for the establishment of a Commission to prevent practices having adverse effect on competition, to promote and sustain competition in markets, to protect the interests of consumers and to ensure freedom of trade carried on by other participants in markets, in India, and for matters connected therewith or incidental thereto.

To achieve its objectives, the Competition Commission of India endeavors to do the following:

- Make the markets work for the benefit and welfare of consumers.
- Ensure fair and healthy competition in economic activities in the country for faster and inclusive growth and development of the economy.
- Implement competition policies with an aim to effectuate the most efficient utilization of economic resources.
- Develop and nurture effective relations and interactions with sectoral regulators to ensure smooth alignment of sectoral regulatory laws in tandem with competition law.
- Effectively carry out competition advocacy and spread the information on benefits of competition among all stakeholders to establish and nurture competition culture in Indian economy.

== Composition ==
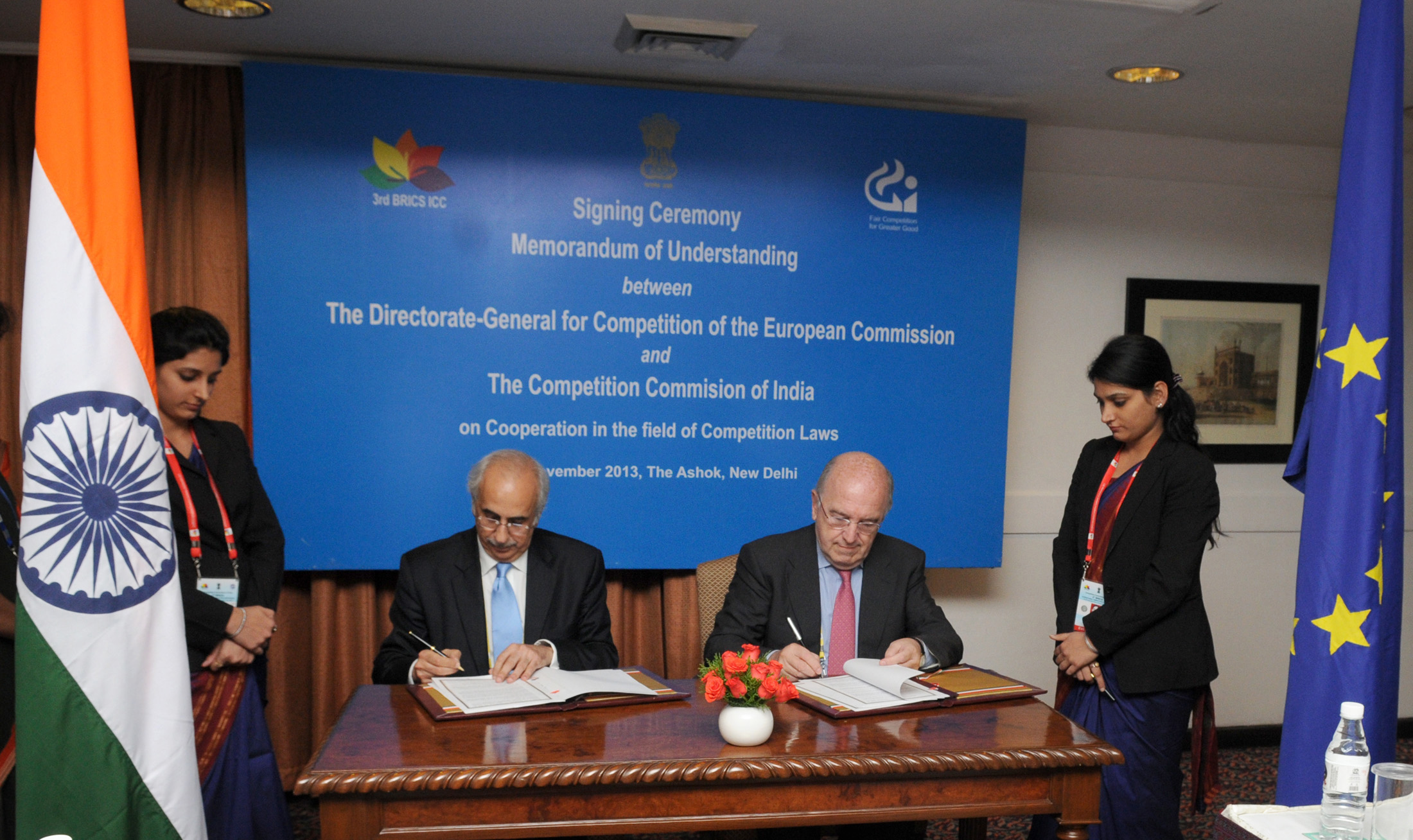
Shri Ashok Chawla, former chairman of the Competition Commission of India, and Mr. Joaquin Almunia, vice-president of the European Commission, signing a Memorandum of Understanding on Cooperation in the Field of Competition Law on 21 November 2013.

The commission comprises a chairperson and not less than two and not more than six other members appointed by the Central Government. Ravneet Kaur is the current chairperson of the CCI. The members of the Competition Commission of India are:

1. Ravneet Kaur
2. Anil Agarwal
3. Sweta Kakkad
4. Deepak Anurag

== Notable cases and actions ==
- In December 2010, CCI instituted a probe to examine if there was any cartelization among traders when onion prices touched 80 rupees, but did not find enough evidence of market manipulation.
- In June 2012, CCI imposed a fine of ₹63.07 billion (US$650 million) on 11 cement companies for cartelisation. It stated that cement companies met regularly to fix prices, control market share and hold back supply which earned them illegal profits.
- In January 2013, CCI modified clauses in agreements between real estate company DLF Limited and apartment buyers. Business and finance portal Moneycontrol.com welcomed the order saying that, "This is a landmark ruling and will benefit property owners across the country". Some of the important modifications were:
  - The Builder cannot undertake any additional construction beyond the approved building plan given to the buyers.
  - The builder will not have complete ownership of open spaces within the residential project area not sold.
  - Not just the buyer but the builder will be liable for any defaults.
  - All payments made by the buyers must be based on construction milestones and not "on demand".
  - The builder will not have the sole power to form the owner’s association.
- On 8 February 2013, CCI imposed a penalty of ₹522 million (US$5.4 million) on the Board of Control for Cricket in India (BCCI) for misusing its dominant position. It found that IPL team ownership agreements were unfair and discriminatory and that the terms of the IPL franchise agreements were loaded in favor of BCCI and franchises had no say in the terms of the contract. It ordered BCCI to "cease and desist" from any practice in future denying market access to potential competitors and not use its regulatory powers in deciding matters relating to its commercial activities.
- In 2014, CCI imposed a fine of ₹10 million upon Google for failure to comply with the directions given by the Director General seeking information and documents.
- On 25 August 2014, CCI imposed a fine of ₹2544 crores on 14 Indian car manufacturers for failure to provide branded spare parts and diagnostic tools to independent repairers, hampering their ability to repair and maintain certain car models. The companies fined were Maruti Suzuki, Mahindra & Mahindra, Tata Motors, Toyota, Honda, Volkswagen, Fiat, Ford, General Motors, Nissan, Hindustan Motors, Mercedes Benz and Skoda.
- On 17 November 2015, CCI imposed a fine of ₹258 crores upon three airlines for cartelization in determining the fuel surcharge on air cargo. A penalty of ₹151.69 crores was imposed on Jet Airways, while InterGlobe Aviation Limited (Indigo) and SpiceJet were levied ₹63.74 crores and ₹42.48 crores respectively.
- In May 2017, CCI ordered a probe into the functioning of the Cellular Operators Association of India following a complaint filed by Reliance Jio against the cartelization by its rivals Bharati Airtel, Vodafone India and Idea cellular.
- On 8 February 2018, it had fined Google's parent company, Alphabet Inc. for ₹135.86 crores for search bias.
- On 12 August 2018, the CCI approved the Disney-Fox deal.
- In July 2018 the Commission imposed fines on the Federation of Gujarat State Chemists and Druggists Association, the Amdavad Chemist Association, the Surat Chemists and Druggists Association, the Chemists and Druggists Association of Baroda, Glenmark Pharmaceuticals, Hetero Healthcare Ltd, Divine Saviour and their staff and officers for breaches of the Competition Act 2002 by requiring No Objection Certificates before appointing stockists.
- In May 2019, Umar Javeed, Sukarma Thapar, Aaqib Javeed vs. Google LLC & Ors. the commission ordered an antitrust probe against Google for abusing its dominant position with Android to block market rivals. In its Prima Facie opinion the commission held, "Mandatory Pre-installation of entire Google Mobile Services (GMS) suite under Mobile application distribution agreements MADA amounts to imposition of unfair condition on the device manufacturers. Leveraging of Google's dominance in Google Play Store to protect relevant markets such as online general search in contravention of Section 4(2)(e) of the Competition Act 2002".
- In June 2019, CCI issued letters to handset makers seeking details of terms and conditions of their agreement with Google. This is to ascertain if Google imposed any restrictions on them for using the company's apps in the past 8 years from 2011.
- In December 2021, CCI took a step back from approving Amazon's investment in a Future Group company, which had initially received its nod in November 2019. Amazon has been blamed for concealing the scope and complete information of its investment while seeking for the approval. In May 2026, the Supreme Court of India set aside an order of the Competition Commission of India that had suspended its 2019 approval of Amazon's investment in Future Coupons Pvt. Ltd. The Court also quashed a penalty of ₹202 crore imposed on Amazon. The Court held that the Commission had already possessed the relevant transaction documents when granting approval and that a subsequent reinterpretation of the same material could not, by itself, justify treating the transaction as one involving suppression or misrepresentation.
- On 31 December 2021, CCI ordered an investigation into Apple Inc. business practices, including the company's enforcement of a proprietary payment system, to be conducted within 60 days.
- In October 2022, CCI imposed a ₹1,338 crore (US$140 million) penalty on Google for abusing its dominance in the licensing of Android OS for smartphones, app store market for Android, general web search services, non-OS specific mobile web browsers and online video hosting platforms in India. A week later, CCI levied a separate ₹936.44 crore (US$97 million) penalty for abusing its Play Store policies. Additionally, it issued a cease-and-desist order directing Google to modify its policies, including allowing mobile application developers to use third-party payment services on its app store.
- In November 2024, the CCI fined Facebook parent company Meta Platforms ₹213 crore (US$22 million) over unlawful practices concerning WhatsApp.

== See also ==
- National Competition Policy (India)
