= Street Vendors Act, 2014 =

Indian law to regulate street vendors

Street Vendors (Protection of Livelihood and Regulation of Street Vending) Act, 2014

Parliament of India
- Long title: An Act to protect the rights of urban street vendors and to regulate street vending activities and for matters connected therewith or incidental thereto.
- Citation: No. 7 of 2014
- Territorial extent: India
- Enacted by: Parliament of India
- Enacted: 6 September 2013 (Lok Sabha); 19 February 2014 (Rajya Sabha)
- Assented to: 4 March 2014
- Signed: 4 March 2014
- Commenced: 1 May 2014
- Introduced by: Kumari Selja, then Union Minister of Housing and Urban Poverty Alleviation
- Status: In force

Street Vendors (Protection of Livelihood and Regulation of Street Vending) Act, 2014 is an Act of the Parliament of India enacted to regulate street vendors in public areas and protect their rights. It was introduced in the Lok Sabha (lower house of the Parliament of India) on 6 September 2012 by then Union Minister of Housing and Urban Poverty Alleviation, Kumari Selja. The Bill was passed by the Lok Sabha on 6 September 2013 and by the Rajya Sabha (upper house) on 19 February 2014. The bill received the assent of the President of India on 4 March 2014. The Act came into force on 1 May 2014.

== Street vendors in India ==
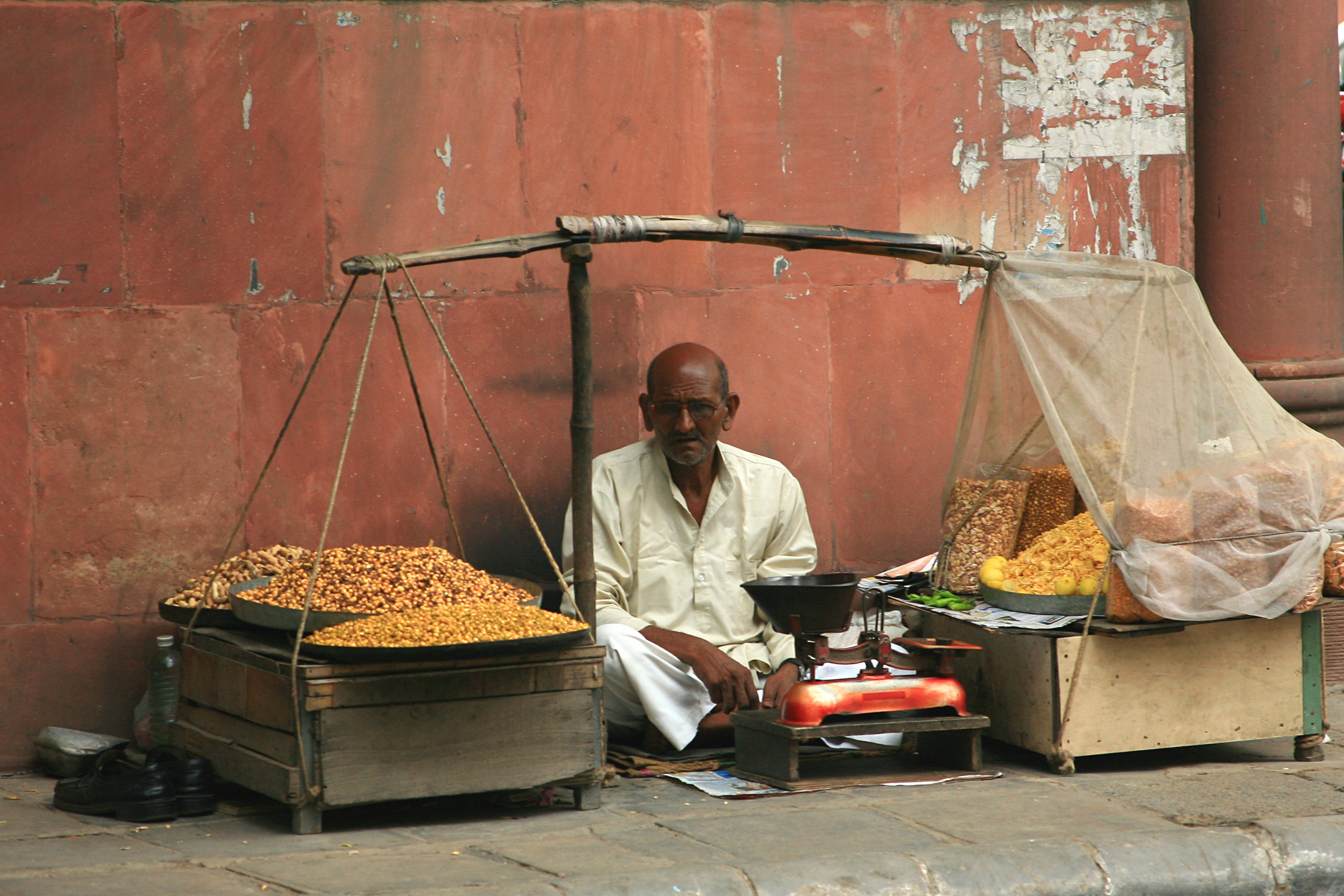
A street vendor selling namkeen snacks, near upmarket Khan Market, Delhi

According to the Ministry of Housing and Urban Poverty Alleviation, there are 10 million street vendors in India, with Mumbai accounting for 250,000, Delhi has 450,000, Kolkata, more than 150,000, and Ahmedabad, 100,000. Most of them are immigrants or laid-off workers, work for an average 10–12 hours a day, and remain impoverished. In India, street vending makes up 14% of total (non-agricultural) urban informal employment. Though the prevalent license-permit raj in Indian bureaucracy ended for most retailing in the 1990s, it continues in this trade. Inadequate license ceiling in most cities, like Mumbai, which has a ceiling of 14,000 licenses, means more vendors hawk their goods illegally, which also makes them prone to the bribery and extortion culture under local police and municipal authorities, besides harassment, heavy fines and arbitrary and sudden evictions. In Kolkata, the profession was a cognisable and non-bailable offense.

Over the years the street vendors have organized themselves into trade unions and associations, and numerous NGOs have started working for them. The National Hawker Federation (NHF), based all over India, is a federation of 1400 street vendor organizations, trade unions in 28 states.

== History ==
The bill aimed at providing social security and livelihood rights to street vendors, has its origins in the 'National Policy For Urban Street Vendors' introduced in 2004, which was later revised as 'National Policy on Urban Street Vendors' in 2009. Also in the same year, the Ministry of Housing and Urban Poverty Alleviation circulated a draft of bill titled, 'Model Street Vendors (Protection of Livelihood and Regulation of Street Vending) Bill, 2009', between all States and Union Territory governments for creation of state legislation, however it had no legal bindings, thus few governments made any progress in this regard. Eventually in 2010, the Supreme Court of India, which has recognized street vending as a source of livelihood, directed the ministry to work out on a central legislation, and a draft of same was unveiled to the public on 11 November 2011. The key point of the draft bill were, protection of legitimate street vendors from harassment by police and civic authorities, and demarcation of "vending zones" on the basis of "traditional natural markets", proper representation of vendors and women in decision making bodies, and establishment of effective grievance redressal and dispute resolution mechanism.

The bill was drafted with the help of the National Advisory Council, chaired by Sonia Gandhi, and approved by the Union Cabinet on 17 August 2012. After the cabinet's approval it was introduced in the Lok Sabha (Lower House of the Parliament of India) on 6 September 2012 by the Union Minister of Housing and Urban Poverty Alleviation, Kumari Selja, amidst the uproar over the coal block allocation scam in the house. The Bill was passed in the Loksabha on 6 September 2013 and by the Rajyasabha on 19 February 2014.

== Content of the Bill ==
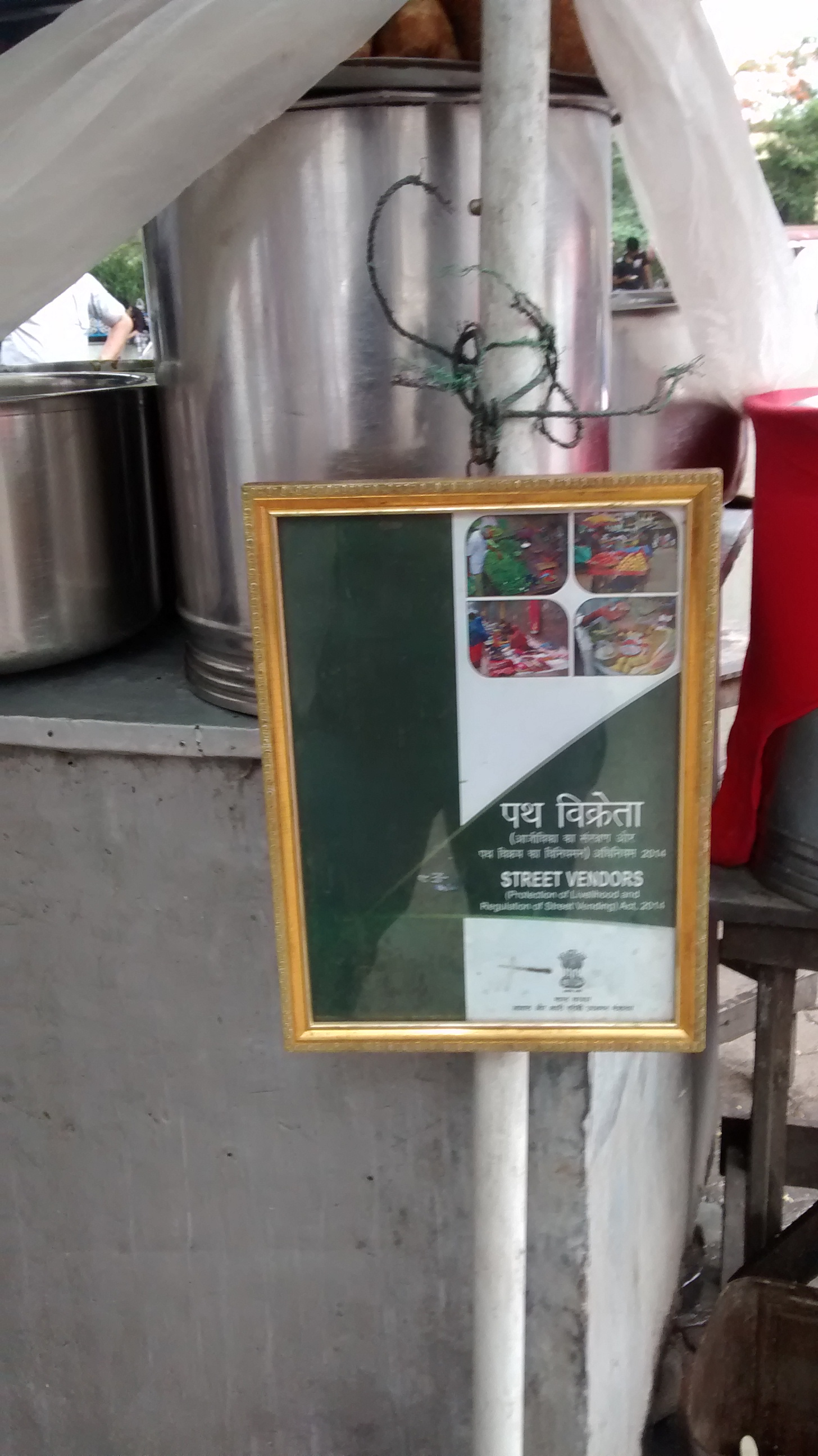
Notification of registered vendor under Act displayed by a vendor in Kolkata

Survey and Accommodation

- The Town Vending Committee is responsible for conducting a survey of all existing street vendors within its jurisdiction. Subsequent surveys must be carried out at least once every five years. No street vendor shall be evicted or relocated until the survey has been completed and a certificate of vending has been issued to all street vendors.
- All existing street vendors identified in the survey shall be accommodated in designated vending zones, subject to a norm conforming to two and a half percent of the population of the ward, zone, town, or city. Where the number of vendors exceeds the holding capacity of a vending zone, allocation of space shall be made by draw of lots. Vendors who cannot be accommodated in a particular vending zone shall be placed in an adjoining vending zone to avoid displacement.

Certificate of Vending

- Every street vendor identified in the survey who has completed fourteen years of age, or such age as the appropriate government may prescribe, shall be issued a certificate of vending by the Town Vending Committee.
- Before being issued a certificate, every vendor must give an undertaking that he will carry on vending himself or through a family member, that he has no other means of livelihood, and that he will not transfer the certificate to any other person in any manner whatsoever.
- Where a vendor dies, suffers permanent disability, or is ill, a family member may vend in his place until the certificate expires, with priority given first to the spouse and then to a dependent child. This is a right to vend in the vendor's place, not a transfer of the certificate itself.
- Certificates shall be issued under the categories of stationary vendor, mobile vendor, or any other category as specified in the scheme. Each certificate shall specify the vending zone, the permitted days and timings, and all applicable conditions. Every vendor issued a certificate shall also receive an identity card.
- In issuing certificates, the Town Vending Committee shall follow criteria specified in the scheme, which shall provide for preference to Scheduled Castes, Scheduled Tribes, Other Backward Classes, women, persons with disabilities, minorities, and such other categories as may be specified.
- Every vendor issued a certificate shall pay vending fees as specified in the scheme. Certificates shall be valid for such period as specified in the scheme and shall be renewable on payment of fees.
- A certificate may be cancelled or suspended if the vendor breaches any of its conditions, contravenes any rules or schemes made under the Act, or if the certificate was obtained through misrepresentation or fraud. No cancellation or suspension shall be made without giving the vendor an opportunity to be heard. Any person aggrieved by such a decision may appeal to the local authority.

Rights and Duties of Street Vendors

- Every street vendor has the right to carry on vending activities in accordance with the terms of his certificate. No vendor may carry out any vending activities in any area earmarked as a no-vending zone.
- Every vendor who occupies space on a time-sharing basis must remove his goods and wares at the end of the permitted period each day.
- Every vendor is obligated to maintain cleanliness and public hygiene in vending zones and adjoining areas, to maintain civic amenities and public property in the vending zone in good condition, and to pay periodic maintenance charges for civic amenities and facilities as determined by the local authority.
- No police officer or other authority may prevent a vendor who is acting within the terms of his certificate from exercising his vending rights, notwithstanding anything contained in any other law in force.

Relocation and Eviction

- The local authority may, on the recommendation of the Town Vending Committee, declare a zone or part of it as a no-vending zone for any public purpose and relocate the vendors in that area. No vendor shall be relocated or evicted without at least thirty days' notice.
- A vendor who fails to vacate after the notice period shall be liable to pay a penalty of up to two hundred and fifty rupees per day of default, but the penalty shall not exceed the value of goods seized.
- The local authority may physically remove a vendor and seize his goods if he fails to vacate after the notice period. A list of goods seized must be prepared and a copy given to the vendor. Non-perishable goods must be released within two working days of a claim being made; perishable goods must be released on the same day of the claim.
- Any vendor who holds a certificate of vending and is relocated is entitled to be allotted a new site or area for carrying out his vending activities, as determined by the local authority in consultation with the Town Vending Committee.

Plan for Street Vending

- Every local authority shall, in consultation with the planning authority and on the recommendations of the Town Vending Committee, prepare a plan for street vending once every five years. The plan shall determine spatial planning norms, earmark vending zones, and designate areas as restriction-free vending zones, restricted vending zones, or no-vending zones. The plan must be submitted to the appropriate government for approval.
- The declaration of a no-vending zone is subject to specific constraints: no existing or natural market identified in the survey may be declared a no-vending zone; overcrowding alone is not a valid basis for such a declaration; sanitary concerns can only justify a no-vending zone declaration if they are solely attributable to vendors and cannot be resolved through civic action by the local authority; and no zone may be declared a no-vending zone until the survey has been carried out and the plan for street vending has been formulated.

Town Vending Committee

- Each local authority shall have a Town Vending Committee, with the Municipal Commissioner or Chief Executive Officer as Chairperson. The appropriate government may, if it considers necessary, constitute more than one Town Vending Committee or a committee for each zone or ward within a local authority.
- At least forty percent of the members of the Town Vending Committee must represent street vendors, elected by the vendors themselves. At least one-third of the vendor representatives must be women. Due representation shall also be given to Scheduled Castes, Scheduled Tribes, Other Backward Classes, minorities, and persons with disabilities from among the vendor representatives. At least ten percent of members must represent non-governmental or community-based organisations.
- Every decision of the Town Vending Committee must be notified along with the reasons for the decision.
- Every Town Vending Committee shall publish a street vendor's charter specifying timelines for the issue and renewal of certificates. It shall maintain up-to-date records of all registered vendors and those issued certificates, and shall carry out social audits of its activities under the Act.

Dispute Resolution

- The appropriate government shall constitute one or more dispute resolution committees. Each committee shall consist of a Chairperson who has been a civil judge or judicial magistrate and two other professionals with such experience as may be prescribed. No employee of the appropriate government or local authority may be a member. Any vendor with a grievance or dispute may apply in writing to this committee. Any person aggrieved by the committee's decision may appeal to the local authority.

Penalties

- A vendor who carries on vending without a certificate, contravenes the terms of a certificate, or contravenes any other terms and conditions specified for the regulation of street vending under the Act or any rules or schemes made thereunder, shall be liable to a fine which may extend up to two thousand rupees per offence, as determined by the local authority.

Promotional and Other Measures

- The appropriate government may undertake promotional measures to make available credit, insurance, and other social security and welfare schemes for street vendors, in consultation with the Town Vending Committee, local authority, planning authority, and street vendors' associations or unions.
- The appropriate government may, to the extent of available resources, organise capacity building programmes for street vendors and undertake research, education, and training programmes to advance understanding of the role of the informal sector and raise public awareness.
- The provisions of this Act shall override any inconsistent provisions in any other law currently in force.

== Shortcomings ==
The National Hawker Federation (NHF) has pointed out that the present bill differs from the draft bill, which ensured that 'Town Vending Committees' (TVC) would have at least 40 per cent representation of street vendors, however the final bill presented in the monsoon session of the Parliament, the civic bodies, which have no representation of street vendors, are made the final authority on all issues concerning their fate, including the rehabilitation and resettlement plans, plus the bill also have legal ambiguities, like no clear definition of "public purpose land", which makes its interpretation liable to misuse of the law.

According to Sharit Bhowmik, professor and chairperson of the Centre for Labour Studies at Tata Institute of Social Sciences, Mumbai, the bill leaves the onus of creating the schemes to the local municipalities of the states, "which defeats the purpose of a Central legislation."
