= National Competition Policy (India) =

National Competition Policy is formulated by the Government of India with a view to achieving the highest sustainable levels of economic growth, entrepreneurship, employment, higher standards of living for citizens, protect economic rights, equitable, inclusive and sustainable economic and social development, promote economic democracy and support good governance by restricting rent-seeking practices. Dhanendra Kumar was the Chairman of the committee which was entrusted with the task of formulating India's National Competition Policy.

== Objectives ==
The policy is aimed at ushering in a second wave of financial reforms. The salient features of the policy are stated below:

1. To guarantee consumer welfare by encouraging optimal allocation of resources and granting economic agents appropriate incentives to pursue productive efficiency, quality and innovation.
2. To remove anti-competition outcome of existing acts, harmonize laws and policies of Centre and State and proactively promote competition principles.
3. Strive for a single national market.
4. Establish a level playing field by providing competitive neutrality.

== See also ==
- Competition Commission of India
- The Competition Act, 2002
- Dhanendra Kumar
