= Navbharat Times =

Indian newspaper

- Type: Daily newspaper
- Format: Broadsheet
- Owner: Bennett, Coleman & Co. Ltd.
- Publisher: Bennett, Coleman & Co Ltd.
- Founded: 1946
- Political alignment: Centre
- Language: Hindi
- Headquarters: Mumbai, India HEAD QUERTER MUMBI INDIA
- Circulation: 769,146 Daily (as of November 2015)
- Sister newspapers: The Times of India; The Economic Times; Ei Samay; Maharashtra Times; Vijaya Karnataka
- Website: NavbharatTimes.com

Navbharat Times is a Hindi newspaper distributed in Delhi, Mumbai, Lucknow and Kanpur. It is from the stable of Bennett, Coleman & Co. Ltd (BCCL), which also publishes other dailies including The Times of India, The Economic Times, Maharashtra Times and also magazines such as Filmfare and Femina. NBT is one of the oldest product of the BCCL group.

== See also ==
- The Times of India
- The Economic Times
- Maharashtra Times
- List of newspapers in India by circulation
- List of newspapers in the world by circulation
- ET Now
- Times Now
- THE HINDU
