= Businessworld =

Indian business magazine

BW Businessworld
- BW Businessworld
- Editor-in-Chief: Anurag Batra
- Categories: Business magazine
- Frequency: Fortnightly
- Founded: 1981
- Country: India
- Based in: New Delhi
- Language: English
- Website: businessworld.in

BW Businessworld is an Indian business magazine owned by media entrepreneur Anurag Batra. The magazine was published by ABP Group, whose most prominent publications are The Telegraph, Anandabazar Patrika, Sananda, Anandamela and others. On 19 September 2013 ABP Group owners Ananda Publishers sold Businessworld to Anurag Batra, owner of media group exchange4media, and Vikram Jhunjhunwala, who runs investment banking and asset management firm Shrine Capital for an undisclosed amount.

Businessworld magazine was founded by ABP group in 1981. In 2021, the publication was in news for unpaid news to its editorial staff.

Annurag Batra is the chairman and editor in chief of Businessworld and Exchange4media and also a member of the board of governors of the Management Development Institute (MDI).
