= Competition Act, 2002 =

Act of the Parliament of India

Parliament of India
- Long title: An Act to give, keeping in view of the economic development of the country, for the establishment of a Commission to prevent practices having adverse effect on competition, to promote and sustain competition in markets, to protect the interests of consumers and to ensure freedom of trade carried on by other participants in markets, in India, and for matters connected therewith or incidental thereto.
- Citation: Act No. 12 of 2003
- Enacted by: Parliament of India
- Assented to: 13 January 2003
- Commenced: 31 March 2003
- Introduced by: Arun Jaitley

Repeals
- The Monopolies and Restrictive Trade Practices Act, 1969
- Status: In force

The Competition Act, 2002 was enacted by the Parliament of India and governs Indian competition law. It replaced The Monopolies and Restrictive Trade Practices Act, 1969. Under this legislation, the Competition Commission of India was established to prevent the activities that adversely affected competition in India. This act extends to the entirety of India.

It is a tool to implement and enforce competition policy and to prevent and punish anti-competitive business practices by firms and unnecessary Government interference in the market. Competition law is equally applicable on written as well as oral agreements and arrangements between or among enterprises and persons.

The Competition Act, 2002 was amended by the Competition (Amendment) Act, 2007 and again by the Competition (Amendment) Act, 2009.

The Act establishes a Commission which is duty bound to protect the interests of free and fair competition (including the process of competition), and as a consequence, protect the interests of consumers. Broadly, the commission's duty is:

- To prohibit the agreements or practices that have or are likely to have an appreciable adverse effect on competition in a market in India (e.g. horizontal and vertical agreements and conduct);
- To prohibit the abuse of dominance in a market;
- To prohibit acquisitions, mergers, amalgamations etc. between enterprises which have or are likely to have an appreciable adverse effect on competition in market(s) in India.

In addition to this, the Competition Act envisages its enforcement with the aid of mutual international support and enforcement network across the world.

== History ==
To regulate advertising, in 1984, Parliament inserted a chapter on unfair trade practices in the Monopolies and Restrictive Trade Practices Act, 1969.

The Monopolies and Restrictive Trade Practices Commission was constituted in the year 1970.

The Monopolies and Restrictive Trade Practices Act, 1969 had its genesis in the Directive Principles of State Policy embodied in the Constitution of India. It received the assent of the President of India on 27 December 1969. The Monopolies and Restrictive Trade Practices Act was intended to curb the rise of concentration of wealth in a few hands and of monopolistic practices. It was repealed in September 2009. The Act has been succeeded by The Competition Act, 2002.

The Competition Bill, 2001 was introduced in Lok Sabha by Finance Minister Arun Jaitley on 6 August 2001.

== Definitions ==
- Acquisition: Acquisition means, directly or indirectly, acquiring or agreeing to acquire shares, voting rights or assets of any enterprise or control over management or assets of any enterprise.
- Cartel: Cartel includes an association of producers, sellers, distributors, traders or service providers who, by agreement among themselves, limit control or attempt to control the production, distribution, sale or price of goods or provision of services.
- Dominant position: It means a position of strength, enjoyed by an enterprise, in the relevant market which enables it to operate independently of competitive forces prevailing in the market or affect its competitors or consumers in its favour.
- Predatory pricing: Predatory pricing means the sale of goods or provision of services, at a price which is below the cost of production of the goods or provision of services, with a view to reduce competition or eliminate the competitors.
- Rule of reason: It is the analysis of any activity under the challenge on the basis of business justification, competitive intent, market impact, impact on competition and on consumer. It is the logic behind the conclusion for any order.

== Salient Features ==
=== Anti-Competitive Agreements ===
Enterprises, persons or associations of enterprises or persons, including cartel, shall not enter into agreements in respect of production, supply, distribution, storage, acquisition or control of goods or provision of services, which cause or are likely to cause an "appreciable adverse impact" on competition in India. Such agreements would consequently be considered void. Agreements which would be considered to have an appreciable adverse impact would be those agreements which-

- Directly or indirectly determine sale or purchase prices,
- Limit or control production, supply, markets, technical development, investment or provision of services,
- Share the market or source of production or provision of services by allocation of inter alia geographical area of market, nature of goods or number of customers or any other similar way,
- Directly or indirectly result in bid rigging or collusive bidding.

=== Types of agreement ===
A 'horizontal agreement' is an agreement for co-operation between two or more competing businesses operating at the same level in the market. A vertical agreement is an agreement between firms at different levels of the supply chain. For instance, a manufacturer of consumer electronics might have a vertical agreement with a retailer according to which the latter would promote their products in return for lower prices.

=== Abuse of dominant position ===
There shall be an abuse of dominant position if an enterprise imposes directly or indirectly unfair or discriminatory conditions in purchase or sale of goods or services or restricts production or technical development or create hindrance in entry of new operators to the prejudice of consumers. The provisions relating to abuse of dominant position require determination of dominance in the relevant market. Dominant position enables an enterprise to operate independently or affect competitors by action

=== Combinations ===
The Act is designed to regulate the operation and activities of combinations, a term, which contemplates acquisition, mergers or amalgamations. Combination that exceeds the threshold limits specified in the Act in terms of assets or turnover, which causes or is likely to cause adverse impact on competition within the relevant market in India, can be scrutinized by the commission.

=== Competition Commission of India ===
Competition Commission of India is a body corporate and independent entity possessing a common seal with the power to enter into contracts and to sue in its name. It is to consist of a chairperson, who is to be assisted by a minimum of two, and a maximum of six, other members. It is the duty of the commission to eliminate practices having adverse effect on competition, promote and sustain competition, protect the interests of consumers and ensure freedom of trade in the markets of India. The commission is also required to give opinion on competition issues on a reference received from a statutory authority established under any law and to undertake competition advocacy, create public awareness and impart training on competition issues.

Commission has the power to inquire into unfair agreements or abuse of dominant position or combinations taking place outside India but having adverse effect on competition in India, if any of the circumstances exists:

- An agreement has been executed outside India
- Any contracting party resides outside India
- Any enterprise abusing dominant position is outside India
- A combination has been established outside India
- A party to a combination is located abroad.
- Any other matter or practice or action arising out of such agreement or dominant position or combination is outside India.

To deal with cross border issues, Commission is empowered to enter into any Memorandum of Understanding or arrangement with any foreign agency of any foreign country with the prior approval of Central Government.

=== Review of orders of Commission ===
Any person aggrieved by an order of the commission can apply to the commission for review of its order within thirty days from the date of the order. Commission may entertain a review application after the expiry of thirty days, if it is satisfied that the applicant was prevented by sufficient cause from preferring the application in time. No order shall be modified or set aside without giving an opportunity of being heard to the person in whose favour the order is given and the Director General where he was a party to the proceedings.

=== Appeal ===
Any person aggrieved by any decision or order of the Commission may file an appeal to the Supreme Court within sixty days from the date of communication of the decision or order of the commission. No appeal shall lie against any decision or order of the commission made with the consent of the parties.

=== Penalty ===
If any person fails to comply with the orders or directions of the Commission shall be punishable with fine which may extend to ₹ 1 lakh for each day during which such non compliance occurs, subject to a maximum of ₹ 10 crore.

If any person does not comply with the orders or directions issued, or fails to pay the fine imposed under this section, he shall be punishable with imprisonment for a term which will extend to three years, or with fine which may extend to ₹ 25 crores or with both.

Section 44 provides that if any person, being a party to a combination makes a statement which is false in any material particular or knowing it to be false or omits to state any material particular knowing it to be material, such person shall be liable to a penalty which shall not be less than rupees fifty lakhs but which may extend to rupees one crore, as may be determined by the commission.

== See also ==
- National Competition Policy (India)
- Competition Commission of India
- Arbitrability Of Competition Disputes In The Indian Context
