= National Buildings Organisation =

- Emblem of India

Agency overview
- Formed: 1954
- Jurisdiction: Republic of India
- Headquarters: G Wing, NBO Building, Nirman Bhawan, New Delhi-110108
- Minister responsible: Minister, Housing and Urban Poverty Alleviation
- Parent department: Ministry of Housing and Urban Poverty Alleviation
- Website: Official website

National Buildings Organisation (NBO) is an autonomous organisation of the Indian Government established in 1954. The organisation is responsible for collecting, collating, validating, analysing, disseminating and publishing housing and building construction statistics. NBO is also responsible for organising training programmes for staff of Indian state governments working in similar fields. In addition, the NBO is involved in a documentation centre for statistics relating to housing, poverty and slums.
