= Hawkers in Kolkata =

Street vendors in Kolkata, India

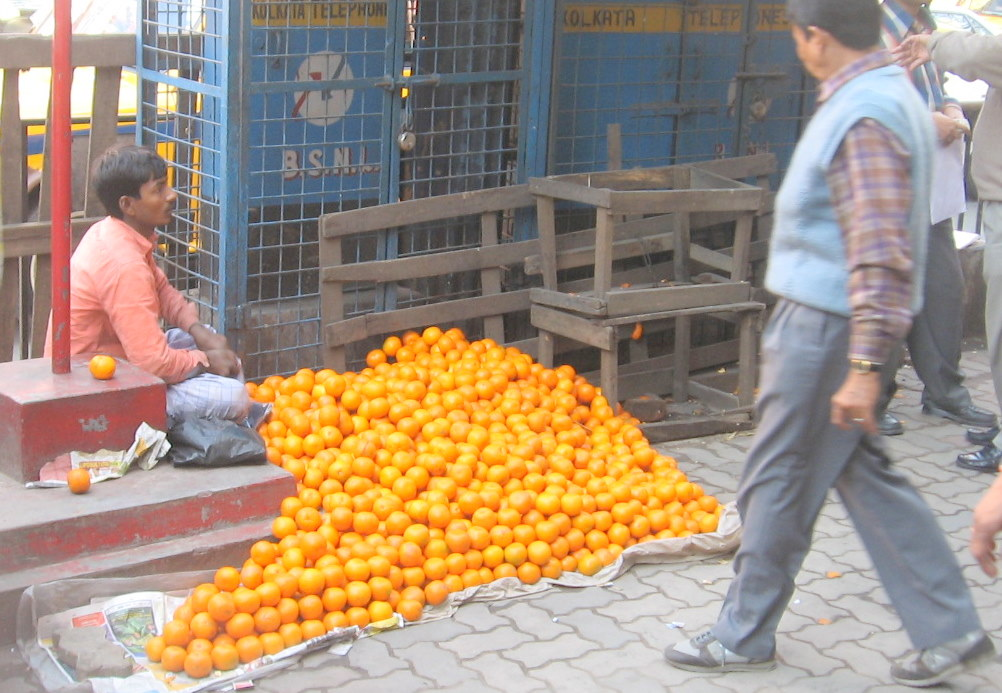
Fruit vendor on Park Street, Kolkata

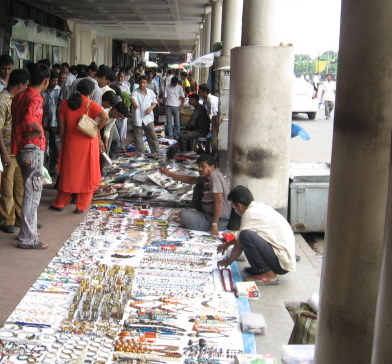
Vendors in Chowringhee

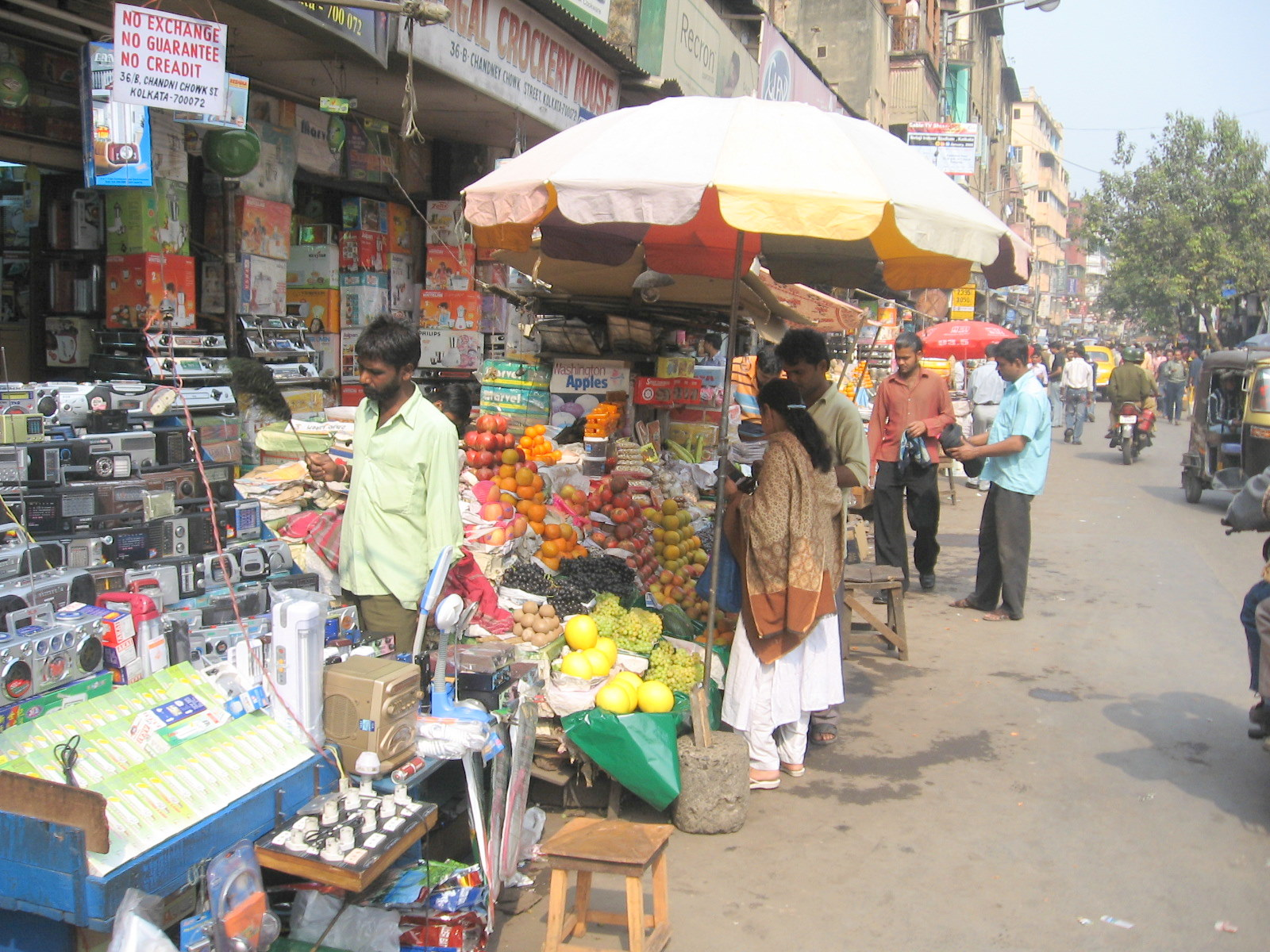
Stalls in Chandni Chawk

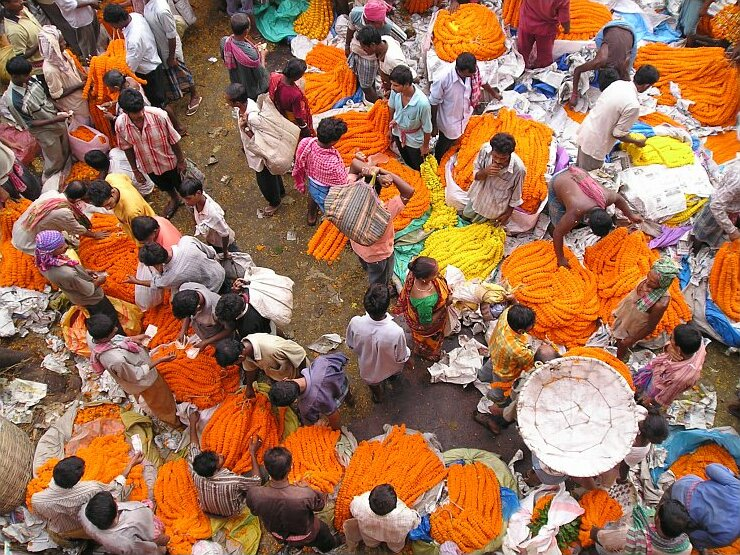
Vendors selling flowers in a road-side market

Hawkers in Kolkata numbering 275,000 generated business worth ₹ 87.72 billion (around 2 billion USD) in 2005. In Kolkata, formerly known as Calcutta, in the Indian state of West Bengal, almost 80 per cent of the pavements are encroached by hawkers and illegal settlers. In many countries, hawkers use pavements or other public places to retail their goods or services but in Kolkata the magnitude has drawn special attention of administrators and law courts.

== Background ==
The population of Kolkata urban agglomeration grew from 1,510,000 in 1901 to 4,670,000 in 1951 to 9,194,000 in 1981. Kolkata did draw in people from rural areas by offering a better quality of life. As in any other Indian city, the immigrants found poverty in Kolkata as severe and dehumanising as in the villages, but were offered a relatively quick opportunity of new income through placement in the urban economy. With the partition of India in 1947, the metropolitan cities of Kolkata and Delhi were flooded by displaced persons or refugees from Pakistan. The Union government at Delhi, with better resources at its command, handled the task of rehabilitation faster and more comprehensively, than the state government in Kolkata could accomplish. Left largely to themselves the refugees in Kolkata gradually secured their placements in the urban economy.

The 1951 census found that only 33.2 percent of Kolkata's inhabitants were city-born, the rest were immigrants: 12.3 percent were from elsewhere in West Bengal, 26.6 percent from other Indian states, and 26.9 percent from East Pakistan. In 1981, the Government of West Bengal estimated the total number of persons displaced from East Bengal to the state to be around 8 million or one sixth of the total population of the state. Several million refugees settled in the outskirts of Kolkata.

The percentage of migrants in Kolkata's population has been declining since the 1950s, though around a third of the population still consists of fresh migrants. Kolkata is gradually attaining a state of saturation. It has also been affected by economic decline resulting from industrial sickness. In 2005, West Bengal headed the list of states with sick units. The overall economic scenario is highlighted by the growing number of pavement dwellers. Kolkata had 48,802 pavement dwellers in 1971 and 55,571 in 1985, according to Census and/or KMDA figures. Around two-thirds are from West Bengal and the rest from outside the state.

While the economy of Kolkata has been sliding backwards in many respects, there has been remarkable expansion in certain areas – real estate, information technology and retail trade. Big shopping centres have come up, and along with it there has been a large increase in small shops and pavement stalls.

== Political Actions ==
With hawkers occupying large portions of the pavements, in the sixties the state government, then controlled by the Congress Party, launched Operation Hawker and tried to remove hawkers from the streets of Kolkata. The Communist Party of India (Marxist), then in the opposition, organised the hawkers in active protest. Soon thereafter, the Congress Party was out of power in the state. Later, when the CPI(M) was firmly in saddle as leader of the Left Front for around two decades, it launched Operation Sunshine in 1996. Officers of Kolkata Municipal Corporation, cadres of the CPI(M) along with police battalions demolished the side walk stalls of thousands of hawkers. Such stalls had lined the city's thoroughfares for nearly three decades.This time the hawkers were mobilised by opposition leaders such as Mamata Banerjee but the Left Front remained firm in its conviction to remove hawkers. However, in the face of protests, the municipal administration and the police allowed the hawkers to reoccupy gradually the pavements of streets from which they had been cleared. The Calcutta Hawker Sangram Committee, a union of more than 32 local hawkers' associations formed in the beforemath of Operation Sunshine, took the leadership to reclaim the footpaths. The situation has come to such a pass that according to a deputy commissioner of Kolkata Police, 80 per cent of Kolkata's pavements are encroached by hawkers and illegal settlers. Pedestrians are forced to use the roads because there is hardly any space on the pavements for walking, and once people are getting used to walking on the streets, they continue to do so even if the side walks are vacant. Some reports suggest that the hawkers have made a comeback on the streets of Kolkata during the period 2000-2005 when Trinamool Congress was in power in Kolkata Corporation.

== Legal action ==
With the politicians dilly-dallying, the matter rolled on to the courts as public interest litigation. In 1996, Kolkata High Court asked the state government to submit a detailed report on pavement encroachment. In 1998, another case demanding rehabilitation of hawkers was moved in the court. In 2003, the high court asked the state government to state its stand on hawkers. In 2005, the state government informed the high court that a uniform policy on rehabilitation of hawkers was underway. In 2007, the high court found that its 1996 order was not implemented.

Commenting on a petition filed by environmentalist Subhas Dutta in 2004, the division bench of Chief Justice V.S. Sirpurkar and Soumitra Sen observed in 2006, that the hawker menace was growing like cancer. It was impossible for people to walk on the roads, forget about footpaths.

The advocate general informed the high court that the state government had drawn out a plan regarding the hawkers. The highlights of the plan were earmarking of hawker free zone, creating some hawking zones, setting time limits for hawking, banning erection of permanent structures, keeping two-thirds of pavement free of hawkers, replacing polythene sheets with colourful umbrellas, removing of hawkers from 50 yards (46 m) of crossings, and issuing licences to existing hawkers only.

== Municipal Corporation ==
Bikash Bhattacharya, Mayor of Kolkata, has said that hawkers would be allowed to stay on all pavements across the city and they would be allowed to occupy a third of the pavements along the streets but they would not be allowed to occupy space within a 50-metre radius of road crossings or build any structures.

According to the Hawker Sangram Committee, "Hawkers are exploited by the agents of trade union leaders, politicians, police, civic councillors. They have to pay to earn their bread." The hawkers pay ₹ 2.66 billion as bribe. This is around 3 per cent of the business. The Committee says, "We are willing to pay rent or some other form of tax to the civic body if we get the right to conduct business. Identity cards will protect us from extortion by multiple agencies,"

There are several unions or associations of hawkers, such as Calcutta Hawkers' Men Union and Bengal Hawkers Association.
