= Board for Industrial and Financial Reconstruction =

Indian government agency

- Formation: 1987
- Dissolved: 30 November 2016
- Type: Development Finance Institution
- Legal status: Statutory
- Purpose: Sick company remedies
- Location: New Delhi
- Coordinates: 28.625846°N 77.220299°E
- Region served: India
- Chairman: Nirmal Singh
- Parent organisation: Ministry of Finance, Government of India
- Website: www.bifr.nic.in

The Board for Industrial and Financial Reconstruction (BIFR) was a development finance institution under the ownership of Ministry of Finance, Government of India, part of the Department of Financial Services of the Ministry of Finance. Set up in January 1987 by the Rajiv Gandhi government, its objective was to determine sickness of industrial companies and to assist in reviving those that may be viable and shutting down the others. On 1 December 2016, the Narendra Modi government dissolved BIFR and referred all proceedings to the National Company Law Tribunal (NCLT) and National Company Law Appellate Tribunal (NCLAT) as per provisions of Insolvency and Bankruptcy Code.

== History ==
The BIFR was established under The Sick Industrial Companies (Special Provisions) Act, 1985 (SICA). The board was set up in January 1987 and became functional as of 15 May 1987. A new industrial policy was tabled in Parliament on 24 July 1991 aiming to maintain growth in productivity and gainful employment and to encourage the growth of entrepreneurship and upgrades to technology. That year the SICA was amended to include public sector enterprises in the board's purview.

The Securitisation and Reconstruction of Financial Assets and Enforcement of Security Interest (SARFAESI) Act of 2002 placed corporate debt outside the purview of the BIFR. By preventing reference to the BIFR, which had become a haven for the promoters of sick companies, the Act gives banks and financial institutions a better tool for recovering bad debt. It was complemented by the corporate debt restructuring package under which lenders and borrowers would meet to agree on a way of recasting stressed debt.

National Company Law Tribunal (NCLT) and the National Company Law Appellate Tribunal (NCLAT) would take over the functions of the BIFR and other bodies and speed up the process of winding down sick companies. The Companies (Amendment) Bill, 2001 was introduced because the government considered that the BIFR had not met its objective of preventing industrial sickness. The Sick Industrial Companies (Special Provisions) Repeal Act, 2003 replaced SICA and sought to dissolve the BIFR and the Appellate Authority for Industrial and Financial Reconstruction (AAIFR), replacing them by the NCLT and NCLAT. However, legal hurdles prevented the NCLT from being constituted.

== Structure and objectives ==
The Board has a Chairman and from two to fourteen other members, all to be qualified as High Court judges or else to have at least fifteen years of relevant professional experience. The Board only handles large or medium-sized sick industrial companies in which large amounts have been sunk. Under the Sick Industrial Companies Act, the Board of a sick industrial company is legally obliged to report it to the BIFR, and the BIFR has the power to make whatever inquiries are needed to determine if the company is in fact sick.

Among other objectives the act was to provide a way to revive sick industrial companies and release public funds. If a company is found to be sick, the BIFR can give the company reasonable time to regain health (bring total assets above total liabilities) or it can recommend other measures. The board can take other actions including changes to management, amalgamation of the sick unit with a healthy one, sale or financial reconstruction. The Board can recommend a sick industrial company for winding up.

The BIFR was intended to bridge the legal gap between sickness and revival. It would impose time schedules for revival related activities to be completed, oversee their implementation and conduct periodic reviews of sick accounts. The BIFR would provide a forum for sharing views, coordinating effort and developing a unified approach to dealing with sick companies, speeding up the start of corrective action. The BIFR was meant to either turn companies around within six months or order closure.

== Activity and results ==
By the end of March 1991, the BIFR had registered 1020 cases and heard 954. 175 were dismissed as not maintainable, and 124 were approved for the company to try to become net-worth positive on their own. Of the other 661 cases, the board sanctioned 182 revival plans and recommended that 120 cases be wound up. Up to the end of 2007, the BIFR had registered 5,471 references with 1,337 being recommended for winding up and 825 revival schemes being sanctioned. There were 66 sick Public Sector Enterprises registered with the board as of the end of March 2008, of which the government had approved 34 for revival.

BIFR has had mixed success. Some examples of successful recoveries are the recovery of Bharat Heavy Electricals Limited in the 1980s, and more recently the turnaround of Arvind Mills, Scooters India and the North Eastern Regional Agricultural Marketing Corporation. There have been many more cases where attempts to revive the companies failed, including Binny and Co., Calico Mills, Guest Keen Williams, Hindustan Cables, Metal Box Company and Wyman Gordon. Problems have included insufficient resources, delays and lack of political willingness to take tough decisions. The BIFR in practice often became a way of prolonging the life of unviable companies for years at taxpayer expense.

According to former Telecom Regulatory Authority of India (TRAI) chief Pradip Baijal, the board "was created to deal with the change in status quo outside government and given a quasi-judicial structure, to act in favour of public good, but has perhaps joined the tribe of numerous rent-seekers in the public ownership structure". Discussing MS Shoes, whose reference was registered by BIFR on 22.2.2002. The productions and export turnover of MS Shoes increased from Rs.25 crores to Rs.171.93 crores. The company came up with public issues which were over subscribed by more than 50 times the company attempted for 5 star hotel land and ready built guest house complex at Hudco Place, New Delhi for deluxe 5 star hotel and 4 star hotel. The reasons of sickness was devolvement of public issue of February 1995 and cancellation as well as forfeiture by Hudco of the amount paid by MS Shoes.

Nirmala Ganapathy said: "One look at the track record of BIFR, and it doesn’t take a whiz [sic] to conclude that it is nothing but a graveyard of companies. A tiny fraction comes out healthy — only if the promoter is interested in putting it back up on its feet". The BIFR approved the revival scheme of the company as the promoters brought in Rs. 41.20 crores as on 31.3.2011 and Rs. 22.08 crores as loan to the company to be converted into equity shares further approving the promoters contribution to be converted into equity by increasing authorised capital from existing Rs. 90 crores to Rs. 200 crores. The promoters brought up the company to its healthy situation since the promoters were interested in putting the company back up on its feet.
