= GKW =

GKW may refer to:

- Gauss–Kuzmin–Wirsing operator
- Greenock West railway station, in Scotland
- Guest Keen Williams, an Indian engineering firm
