= MS Shoes =

MS Shoes East Ltd.
- Founded: 17 March 1986
- Founder: Urmil Suri
- Defunct: Active
- Headquarters: Delhi, India
- Area served: Europe, Australia
- Products: Export of shoes and other footwear

MS Shoes East Ltd. is a company established in Delhi, India on 17 March 1986 The main object of the company was to take over running business of exports in the name of Shoes East Propriety. It attracted large investments before collapsing in February 1995. The Bombay Stock Exchange closed for three days after the crash.

In 2005, a rehabilitation scheme for the company was devised by the Board for Industrial and Financial Reconstruction.

== Rise and fall ==
Pavan Sachdeva took over his father's Delhi-based shoe export business, mostly serving Western Europe, and launched the company as MS Shoes in 1986. He raised money from investors and borrowed large sums from financial institutions and banks. Sachdeva used intriguing ads created by the Delhi branch of Rediffusion to attract investors.

During the period 1986–1993, the company won various export awards from the Council of Leather Exports, from Delhi Administration, and from the National Productivity Council. The company came out with its first public issue in September, 1992, followed by a rights-cum-public issue of fully convertible debentures in November/December, 1993. In February 1995 the company made another rights-cum-public issue. The issue was to finance its diversification, setting up a twin-hotel project and yarn project, but it was undersubscribed and was subsequently devolved. Shares were trading at ₹24 in 1993, and peaked at ₹502.5 in January 1995. The underwriters to the public issue have been held to be liable to the extent of ₹98 crore.

Apparently the share prices had been manipulated. When MS Shoes crashed in March 1995 the collateral effects were so severe that the Bombay Stock Exchange had to be closed for three days. More than ₹270 crores were lost.

== Investigations and charges ==
The Central Bureau of Investigation (CBI) started an investigation in 1995. In June 1997 the CBI sought permission from the government to lay charges against senior officials of the Securities and Exchange Board of India (SEBI) and SBI Capital Markets, a subsidiary of the State Bank of India. Sachdeva was charged with violating the Companies Act and the Prevention of Corruption Act. The Central Bureau of Investigation filed a closure report on the MS Shoes case in September 1998, which was accepted by the court.

In 2003, the CBI reopened the case. Several civil and criminal charges were filed. In April 2003 a Delhi Metropolitan Court issued a non-bailable warrant against Sachdeva for failing to pay back money owed to the Indian Air Force Benevolent Association.

In June 2003 the Delhi High Court ordered that the company be sent to the Board for Industrial and Financial Reconstruction (BIFR). Few companies survive this process. In November 2005, MS Shoes was declared a sick company by the BIFR, and a plan was drawn up for its rehabilitation.

== Diversifications ==
Before its collapse, the company attempted the bids floated by Hudco in July, 1994 for 5 star hotel land and a constructed four star hotel by Hudco comprising 363 rooms, 9 restaurants and 25 shops. The promoter Pavan Sachdeva made a successful bid for the properties. The total bid was ₹177.10 crores for which Hudco issued the allotment letters. When the public issue was devolved, Hudco cancelled the allotments. MS Shoes also attempted to go into the yarn manufacture business. The land value of ₹177.10 crores has increased more than ten times. MS Shoes has offered to buy the public shares to its existing public shareholders and presently promoters holding is 95%.

== Later development ==
The production and export turnover of MS Shoes increased from ₹25 crores in 1993 to ₹171.93 crores in 1995. The company came up with public issues which were oversubscribed by more than 50 times. The reasons of sickness was devolvement of public issue and cancellation as well as forfeiture by Hudco of the amount paid of ₹68.68 crores by MS Shoes. The promoters brought in ₹41.20 crores as on 31.3.2011 and ₹22.08 crores in March, 2014 which have been approved to be converted into equity.

MS Shoes claims that it has won a 5-star hotel project.
