= Economic reconstruction =

Proactive process of economic change

Economic reconstruction is a process for creating a proactive vision of economic change. The most basic idea is that problems in the economy, such as deindustrialization, environmental decay, outsourcing, industrial incompetence, poverty and addiction to a permanent war economy are based on the design and organization of economic institutions. Economic reconstruction builds on the ideas of various institutional economists and thinkers whose work both critiques existing economic institutions and suggests modes of organizing society differently (cf. Veblen, 1998). Economic reconstruction, however, places much more emphasis on the idea of alternative plans and alternative organization.

The need for reconstruction occurs as fundamental problems plague the contemporary organization of the economic, political, and even "oppositional" spheres, such as the contemporary organization of social movements. These spheres each tend to support short-term solutions that do not leave in their wake the organization of resources and power in a way that is responsive to citizen needs. Power, democracy and critical alternatives are not linked. In contrast to this state of affairs, economic reconstruction supports the creation of new institutions and the redesign of old ones. The basic idea is to create a new way to organize the economy and society so that institutions work for, rather than against, peoples' interests and needs.

== History ==
The first generation of economic reconstructionists included Thorstein Veblen and John Dewey. (Note: Veblen influenced the work of Seymour Melman and Dewey the work of Paul Goodman.) The second generation included Lewis Mumford. The third generation included Seymour Melman, Percival Goodman and Paul Goodman. Key reconstructionists today include Barry Commoner, Gar Alperovitz and Marcus Raskin. Key figures whose work informs the critique of contemporary society found in the work of economic reconstructionists include Stanley Aronowitz (in his writings about social movements, the state, universities and culture), Noam Chomsky in his writings about anarchist cooperatives and democracy, and John Kenneth Galbraith (in his writings about the economy and economists). Another important figure is Simone Weil whose writings about problems or limits attached to militarism, social science atomization, Marxism, the economy and political parties all resonate with an economic reconstruction agenda.

== Currents ==
Advocates of economic reconstruction advocate fundamental change related to key social problems related to environmental decay, militarism, parasitic globalization, unemployment and depressed living standards based on the social organization of work. In the environment, a key challenge is redesigning "the technosphere" or the ways in which the means of production, transportation and distribution are designed on a relatively unsustainable basis. When it comes to militarism, the key challenge is to support a demilitarized society through economic conversion, disarmament, alternative security, military budget reductions and related social innovations. When it comes to unemployment and depressed living standards, a key challenge is to promote economic democracy, through concrete institutions and actions such as cooperatives, worker participation and control, employee ownership plans, socially responsible firms, community procurement, and various initiatives to organize the economy on a decentralized basis. In many cases, federations among local cooperatives or networks of such firms may prove essential to move beyond the problem of "economic democracy in one firm."

Economic reconstruction also extends to the ways in which housing or communities and media are organized. By reducing dependency on the automobile, by linking work and residence, we can limit the problems creating by congestion, pollution and commuting (particularly those problems based on petroleum based automobile transportation.

Some may argue that economic reconstruction can be reduced to socialism or economic democracy itself or perhaps principles found in various anarchist or radical writings. The problem, however, is that many of these plans lack operational details related to how alternative institutions would actually be designed. These details are essential for creating operational plans and actions. In addition, economic reconstruction is not limited to a specific challenge such as capitalism, but must also address other challenges, i.e. militarism, environmental decay, the sexual and ethnic division of labor, etc. A goal of economic reconstruction is to show the need for multiple, yet integrated solutions to societal breakdown.

== See also ==
- Economic development
- Network for Integrity in Reconstruction
