= Disabled veteran street vendors =

Street vendors in New York City

Disabled veteran street vendors law

New York State Legislature
- Long title: New York General Business Law § 35
- Territorial extent: Cities in New York (state) having a population of one million or more. Essentially limited to New York City
- Passed by: New York State Legislature
- Passed: 1894
- Status: Current legislation

Disabled veteran street vendors in New York City are legally exempt from municipal regulations on street vendors, under a 19th-century New York state law. As of 2004, there were 374 permitted disabled veteran street vendors, 60 of whom were permitted to operate inside Midtown Manhattan.

== History ==
In 1894, the New York Legislature granted physically disabled Civil War veterans exemptions from municipal laws limiting "hawking or peddling". The original legislation covered all commercial streets and public parks in the state.

Numerous court decisions upheld the 1894 statute over municipal regulations of all sorts, including those that attempted to limit the products that vendors could sell to printed materials and food. The legislation gained new meaning after World War I, World War II, the Korean War, and the Vietnam War created a large pool of veterans unable to secure traditional employment as a result of their disability.

In 1990, the New York Supreme Court, Appellate Division held that the 1894 law preempted a 1979 city ordinance banning street vendors from 30th to 61st Streets, between Second and Ninth Avenues, except on Sundays. In 1991, the legislation's effect was restricted in Midtown Manhattan, limiting the total number of vendors allowed, and placing some congested Avenues and sidewalks off limits. That legislation expired in 2003.

Legislation has been introduced in the New York Senate to make impersonation of such a vendor a Class A misdemeanor.

== Current text ==
N.Y. General Business Law § 35 provides:

This article shall not affect the application of any ordinance, by-law or regulation of a municipal corporation relating to hawkers and peddlers within the limits of such corporations, but the provisions of this article are to be complied with in addition to the requirements of any such ordinance, by-law or regulations; provided, however, that no such by-law, ordinance or regulation shall prevent or in any manner interfere with the hawking or peddling, without the use of any but a hand driven vehicle, in any street, avenue, alley, lane or park of a municipal corporation, by any honorably discharged member of the armed forces of the United States who is physically disabled as a result of injuries received while in the service of said armed forces and the holder of a license granted pursuant to section thirty-two.

== Current practice ==
Disabled veterans are required to abide by local licensing requirements for vendors, as provided in General Business Law § 35. However, time, place, and manner restrictions have been found to violate § 32. The General Business Law does not preempt the Vehicle and Traffic Law, section 1157, which prohibits peddling from a parked motor vehicle.

On non-restricted streets, there is no limit to the number of disabled veteran street vendors that can operate in a given area. On restricted streets in Midtown Manhattan only one may operate; outside of Midtown, two.

For example, some areas would otherwise be off limits to street vendors entirely because they would either be ticketed for being too far from the curb or obstructing a bus or taxi stop. Such is the case in the plaza outside the Metropolitan Museum of Art—"the most coveted location for selling a hot dog in New York", for which a company called New York One has paid the city $575,990/year since 2007 to operate two carts—where the city began to crack down on veteran vendors in August 2009. New York One was able to negotiate their rent down to $364,672 for 2007 due to the competition from veteran vendors, and later ended its contract early; the winner of the auction to succeed New York One was later evicted for non-payment.

Some vendors have alleged that their competitors merely hire veterans to sit near their carts, a practice lawyers for the city say would not qualify under the law.

== Effect on First Amendment vendors ==
Once a Blue or Yellow (not White) licensed disabled veteran street vendor is operating on an otherwise restricted street, vendors of First Amendment protected merchandise such as art and books can also operate on the street. Once the disabled veteran street vendors opens up, there is no limit to the number of First Amendment street vendors that can follow. So-called "First Amendment vendors" (who do not require permits themselves) follow disabled veterans because they are legally entitled to operate on any area where vending is permitted. Such has been upheld in court decisions.
