= Hawker (trade) =

Street vendor

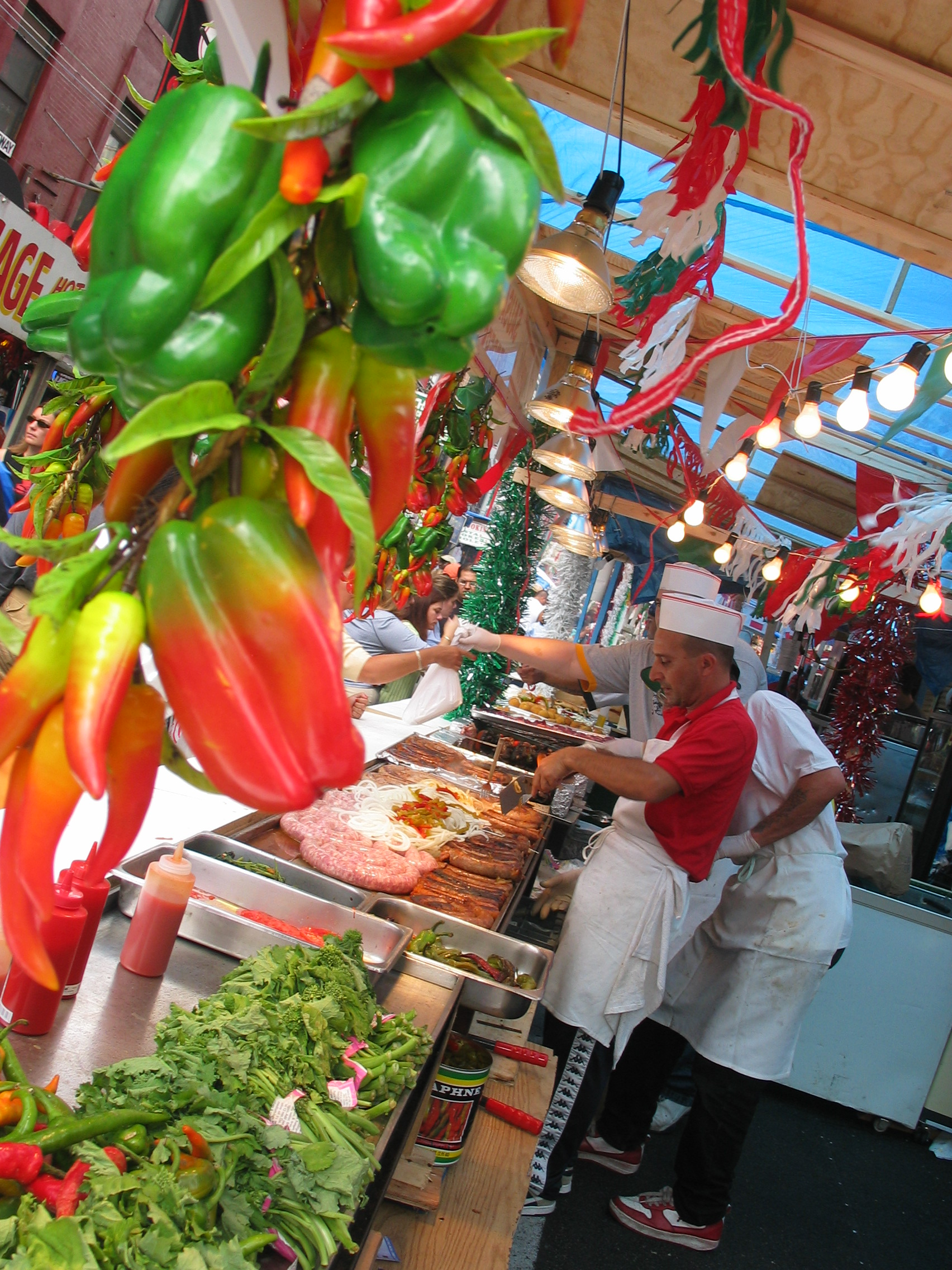
Street vendors, as hawkers are referred to in the United States, particularly in New York City, sell food at the Feast of San Gennaro in Little Italy, in Lower Manhattan.

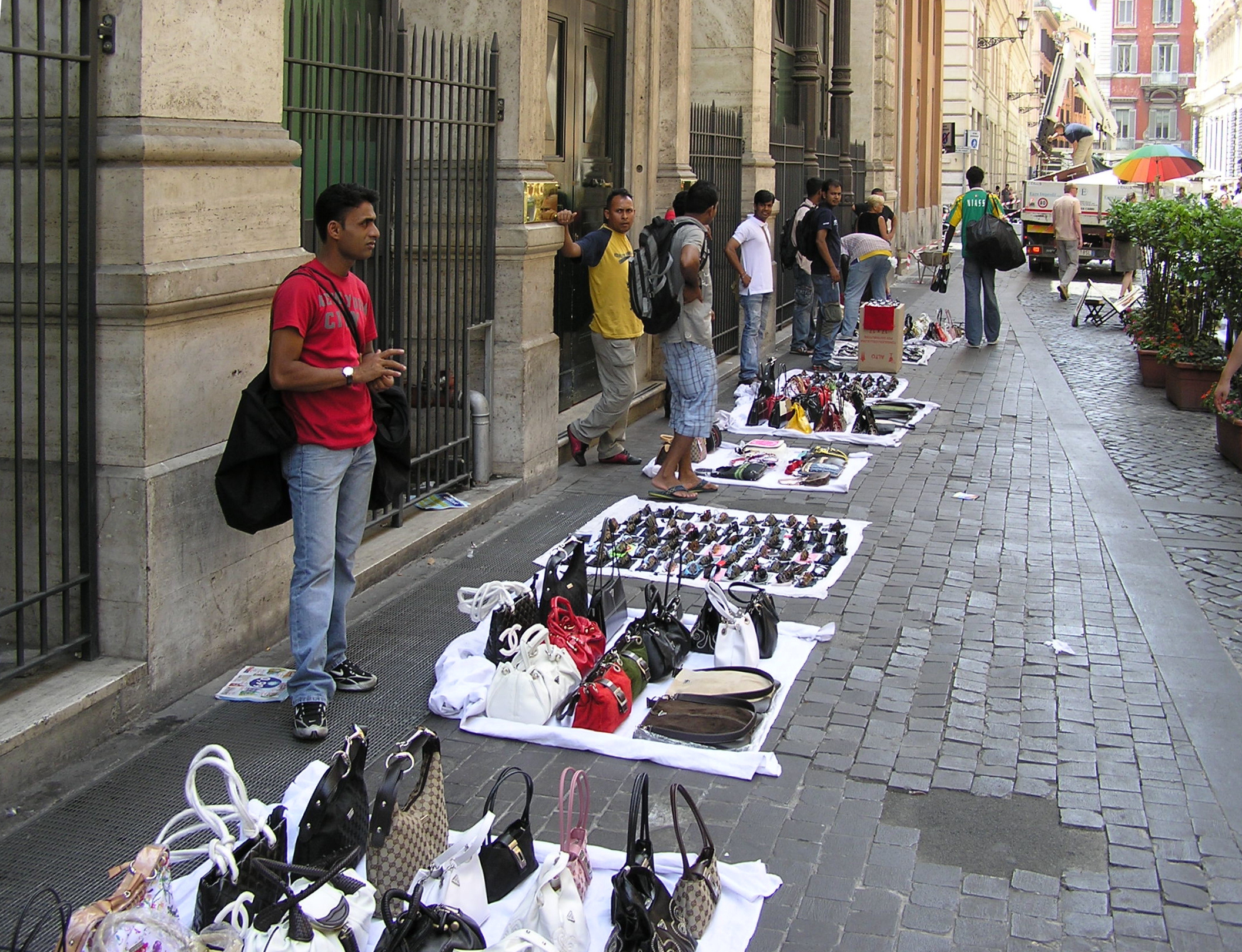
Hawkers selling bags and sunglasses on a sidewalk in central Rome, Italy

A hawker is a vendor of merchandise that can be easily transported; the term is roughly synonymous with costermonger or peddler. In most places where the term is used, a hawker sells inexpensive goods, handicrafts, or food items. Whether stationary or mobile, hawkers often advertise by loud street cries or chants, and conduct banter with customers, to attract attention and enhance sales.

== Definition ==
A hawker is a person who sells things on the streets or roads; "a person who travels from place to place selling goods". Synonyms include huckster, peddler, chapman or in Britain, costermonger. However, hawkers are distinguished from other types of street vendors in that they are mobile. In contrast, peddlers, for example, may take up a temporary pitch in a public place. Similarly, hawkers tend to be associated with the sale of non-perishable items such as brushes and cookware, while costermongers are exclusively associated with the sale of fresh produce. When accompanied by a demonstration or detailed explanation of the product, the hawker is sometimes referred to as a demonstrator or pitchman.

Audio of a hawker selling books on a bus in Odisha, India

Social commentator Henry Mayhew wrote, "Among the more ancient of the trades, then carried on in England, is that of the hawker or pedlar", and he notes, "the hawker dealt, in the old times, more in textile fabrics than in anything else." In several passages of his work, Mayhew categorises hawkers, hucksters, and peddlers as a single group of itinerant salesman, and claims that he is unable to say what distinction was drawn between a hawker and a huckster. Mayhew estimated the number of licensed pedlars in 1861 as 14,038 in England, 2,561 in Scotland, and 624 in Wales.

== History ==
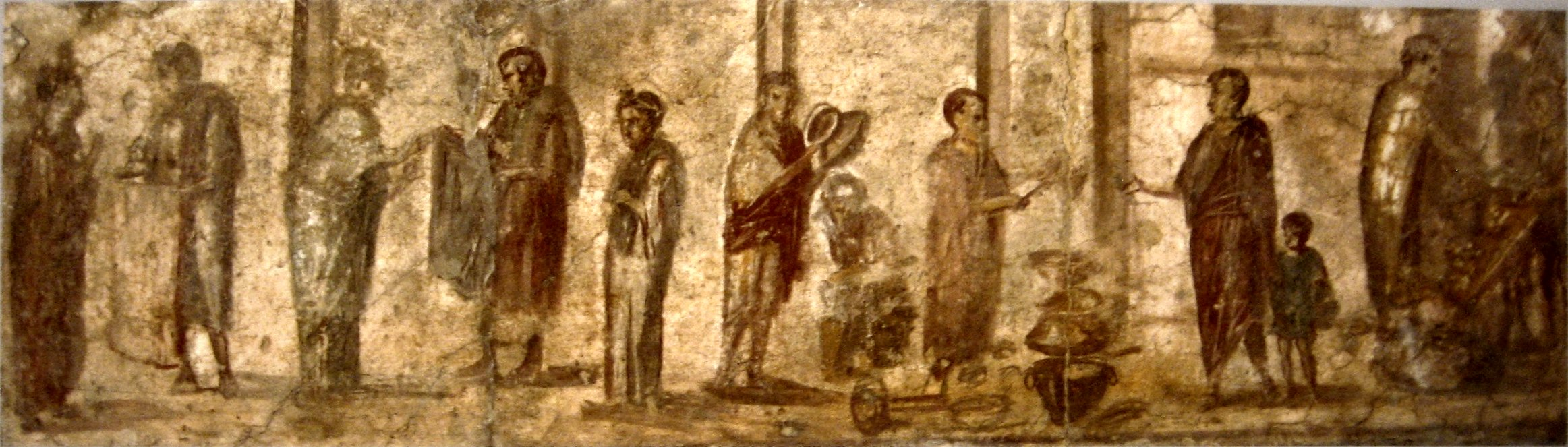
Fresco from the House of Julia Felix, Pompeii depicting scenes of various hawkers and traders at the Forum

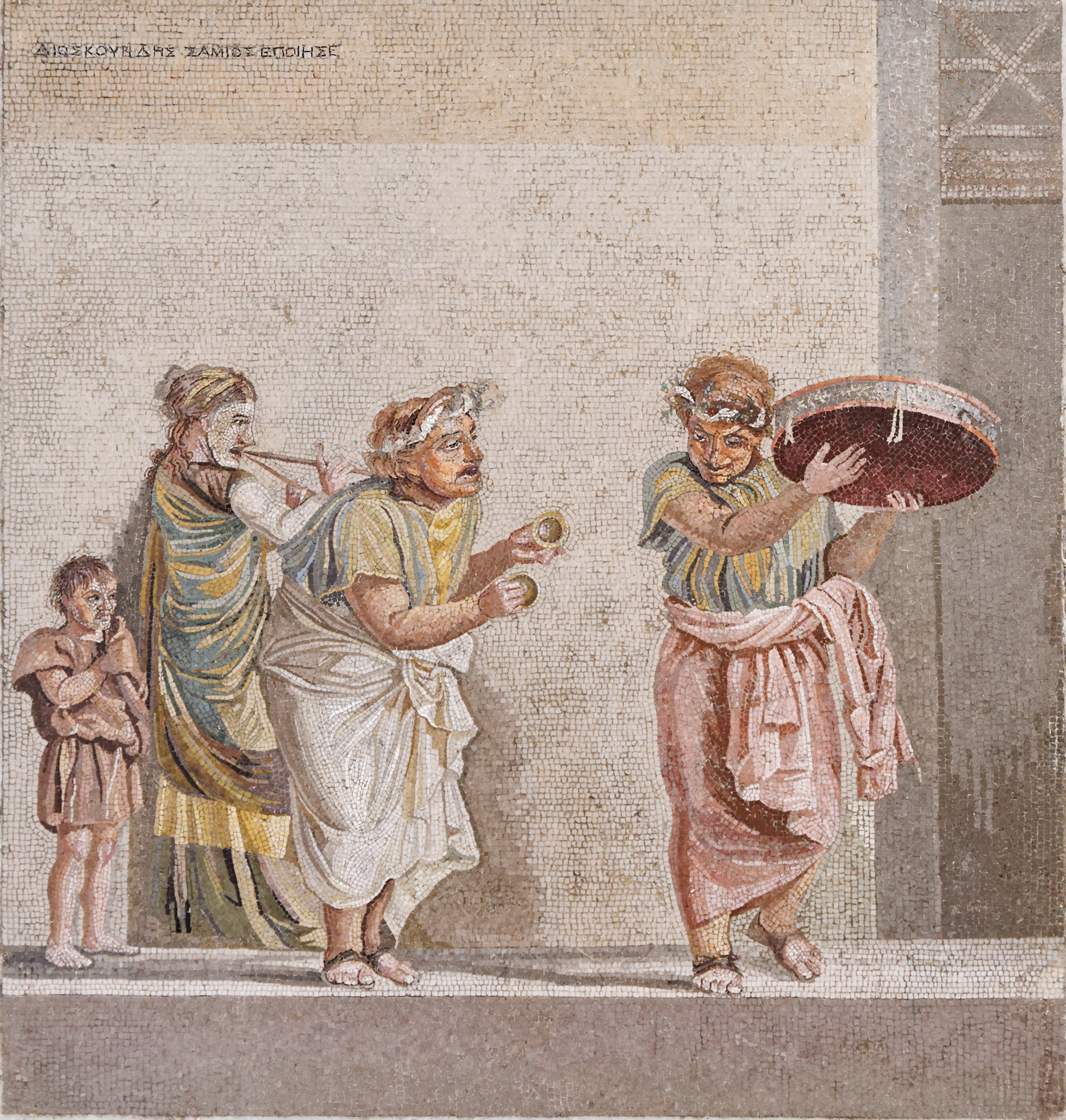
Musical hawkers from the house of Dioskourides of Samos, Pompeii

Hawkers have been known since antiquity and possibly earlier. Claire Holleran has examined literary, legal and pictorial sources to provide evidence for the presence of hawkers in antiquity, especially ancient Rome. Her findings indicate that the Romans had no specific term for hawkers – rather they went by a variety of labels including: ambulator (a person who walks around); circitor (to go around); circulator (a broad term which included itinerant entertainers) and institor (a business manager). She found that hawkers and street vendors were an important part of the distribution system. The vendors mainly sold everyday food at low prices and clustered around temples, theatres, bathhouses and forums where to take advantage of the optimal commercial opportunities. Their street cries were part of the fabric of street life yet were largely viewed as an unwelcome disturbance. In Roman society, hawkers experienced the same disdain that Romans held for retail generally; hawkers were low in social status, with privileged groups often referring to them in pejorative terms.

Literary references and images of hawkers and peddlers during the medieval period are relatively rare. Hawkers, hucksters and peddlers occupied a different social position to merchants and were regarded as marginal in society. However, English narratives from the 12th and 13th centuries suggest that hardworking hawkers could advance to positions as packmen and ultimately wealthy wholesalers or merchants.

== Global society and informal street vending ==
Traditionally deeply rooted in the social and economic fabric of many countries in the Global South, the practice of street vending has, in recent decades, extended its reach to even the most developed nations, taking on various forms. While not strictly confined to the informal economy, since street entrepreneurs can theoretically position themselves along a continuum ranging from entirely formal to entirely illegal, contemporary societies are unmistakably trending towards the informal extreme. From a comparative analysis of various socio-anthropological studies on street vendors, recurring and interconnected figures emerge, which can be categorized into distinct types: the recognized vendor, whose role is legitimate and/or institutionally accepted; the ephemeral vendor, whose activity is sporadic and often goes unrecognized; the clandestine trader, whose work lacks legitimacy. Furthermore, they can be classified based on their mobility: the stationary vendor, conducting business in a fixed location; the semi-stationary vendor, operating in makeshift structures; and the mobile vendor, conducting business by moving to different locations. According to M. Meneghetti, informal street vending in global society often represents a complex and highly flexible form of agency that allows for the adaptation and functional development of the social actor practicing it in relation to a given personal or collective situation of distress (real or perceived), whether it be social, legal, cultural, economic, or political.

== Regional ==
=== Africa ===
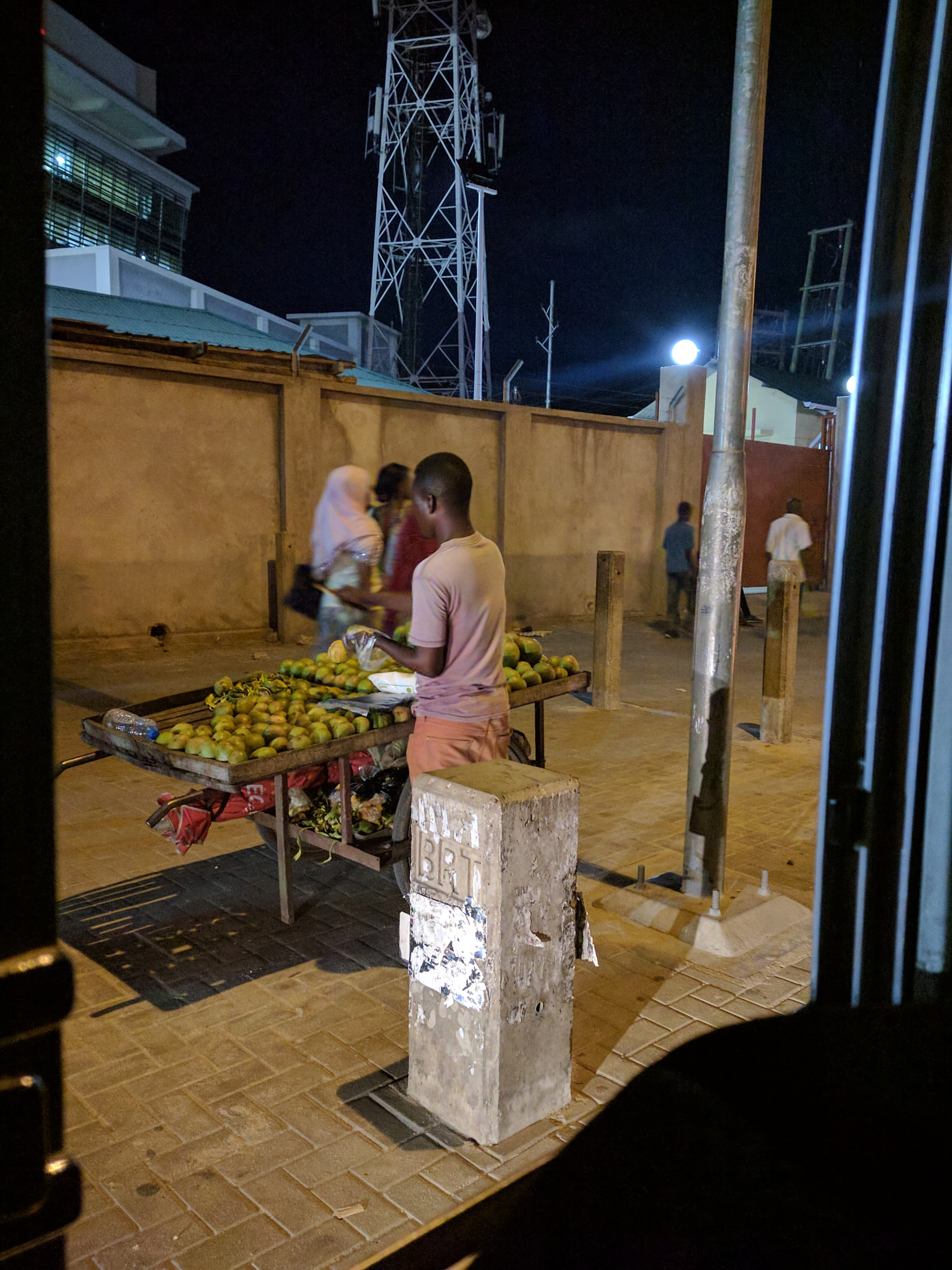
A vendor in Dar es Salaam selling fruit.

In many African metropolitan areas, hawkers, commonly referred to as "vendors", are seen everywhere. They sell a wide range of goods such as fish, fruits, vegetables, clothes and books. In suburban areas, they go door to door; in more commercial areas, they usually have stands or lay their goods on the ground. In the afternoon, many of them sell commercial goods in the more crowded parts of the cities, and at night, they sell juices, tea and snacks. The prices are lower than in shops and so attract people on low incomes.

=== Asia ===
==== India ====
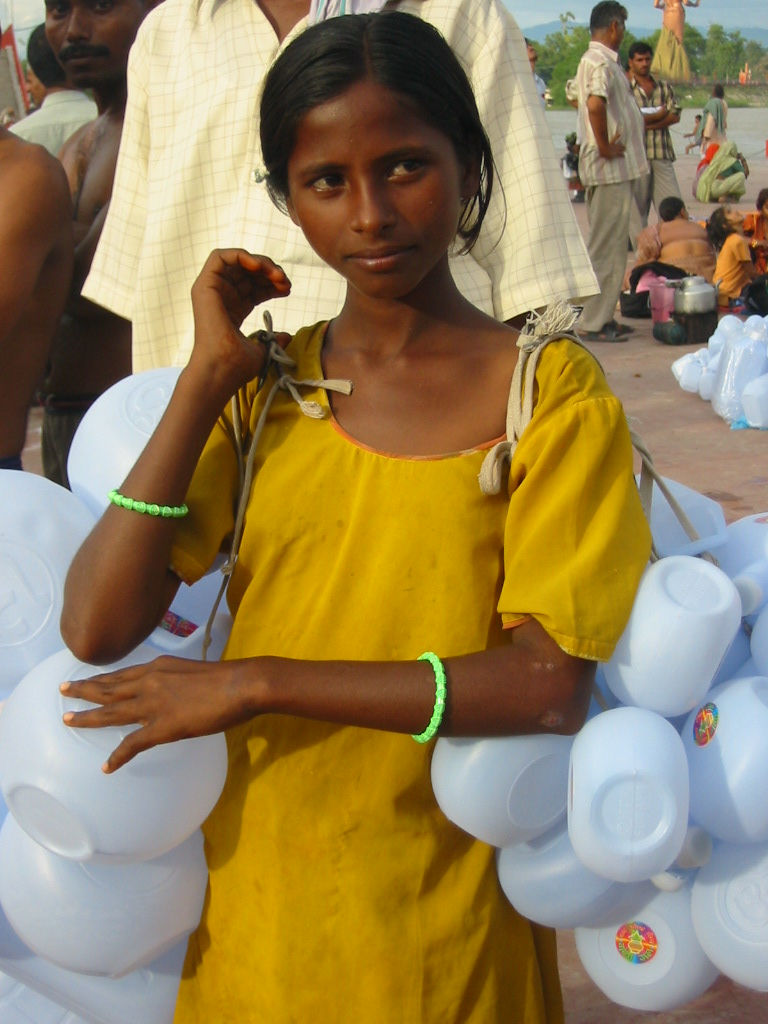
A girl selling plastic containers for carrying Ganges water, Haridwar, India. Many street vendors in South Asia are children.

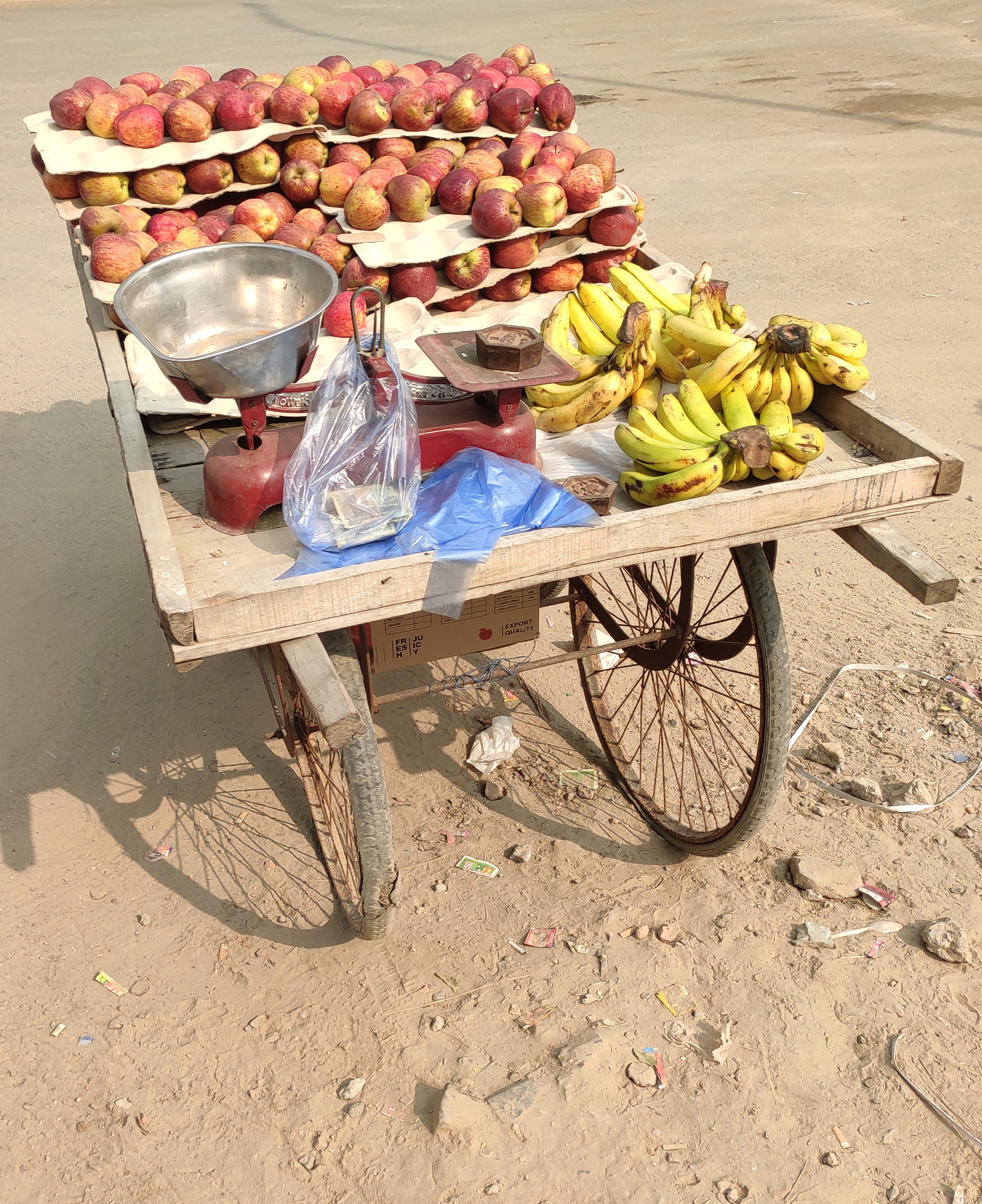
A fruit seller's customized mobile stall in India

According to the Ministry of Housing and Urban Poverty Alleviation, there are 10 million street vendors in India, with Mumbai accounting for 250,000, Delhi has 200,000, Kolkata, more than 150,000, and Ahmedabad, 100,000. Most of them are immigrants or laid-off workers, work for an average 10–12 hours a day, and remain impoverished. Though the prevalent license-permit raj in Indian bureaucracy ended for most retailing in the 1990s, it continues in this trade. Inappropriate license ceiling in most cities, like Mumbai which has a ceiling 14,000 licenses, means more vendors hawk their goods illegally, which also makes them prone to the bribery and extortion culture under local police and municipal authorities, besides harassment, heavy fines and sudden evictions. In Kolkata, the profession was a cognisable and non-bailable offense.

Over the years, the street vendors have organized themselves into trade unions and associations, and numerous NGO's have started working for them. In fact, The National Association of Street Vendors of India (NASVI) based in Delhi, is a federation of 715 street vendor organizations, trade unions and non-governmental organizations (NGOs). Kolkata has two such unions, namely the Bengal Hawkers Association and the Calcutta Hawkers' Men Union. In September, 2012, long-awaited Street Vendors (Protection of Livelihood and Regulation of Street Vending) Act was introduced in the Lok Sabha (Lower of Indian Parliament) aimed at providing social security and livelihood rights, and regulated the prevalent license system. The Bill was passed in the Lok Sabha on 6 September 2013 and by the Rajya Sabha (upper house) on 19 February 2014. The bill received the assent of the President of India on 4 March 2014. Only three states have implemented the bill as of April 2017. The bill handed governance over public space and vendors over to municipalities. Although, one of the main purposes of the Street Vendors Act was to allow the vendors to have a voice in governance, the bill made conditions more difficult for vendors as they have become more heavily scrutinized.

==== Bangladesh ====
In the capital city of Dhaka, street vendors such as small tea stalls, and popular food stalls (fuchka, chotpoti) along the public spaces (university campuses, bus terminals, market places) have a significant role to cater to the urban population. Street vendors are a source of food security, especially to the poorer section of the urban population. Street vending is significant portion of Dhaka's informal economy, an employment opportunity for better livelihoods of the urban poor.

==== Indonesia ====
Hawkers in Indonesia locally known as pedagang kaki lima ("five‑foot traders") play a central role in the nation’s street‑food culture. These informal vendors operate from mobile carts (gerobak), bicycles (sepeda), or through traditional shoulder‑carried baskets (pikulan or sunggi), and often set up temporary stalls or small warung beneath tarps along pedestrian pavements, especially during peak hours. The term "pedagang kaki lima" originates from the colonial-era architectural regulation known as "five‑foot way", a covered sidewalk roughly five feet (1.5 m) wide mandated by British Governor‑General Thomas Stamford Raffles in Batavia (1811–1816) and due to a Malay linguistic inversion of the English modifier structure (five‑foot way) it became misinterpreted as "kaki lima" ("five feet") and eventually came to refer to the street hawkers who occupied these sidewalks.

Pedagang kaki lima in Indonesia offer a vast array of foods, ranging from hearty dishes to light snacks and beverages. Popular main dishes include bakso, meatball soup served with broth, noodles, scallions, and chili, which are ubiquitous in urban and rural areas alike. Another staple is sate (satay), skewered and grilled meats like chicken, goat, or beef, typically served with peanut sauce or sweet soy sauce and commonly accompanied by rice cakes (lontong) or raw shallot and chili. Vendors also specialize in martabak, both sweet (filled with chocolate, cheese, or nuts) and savory (egg, minced meat, spices) and nasi goreng tek‑tek, a version of fried rice cooked in a large wok with distinctive "tek‑tek" sizzling sounds. Breakfast and comfort options include bubur ayam (chicken congee) widely available from morning into evening, while dessert and refreshment come in the form of sweet, iced beverages such as es cendol (coconut-based drink with green rice flour jelly) and es doger (shaved ice with coconut, fermented cassava, and milk).

Pedagang kaki lima are deeply entrenched throughout Indonesia, serving as a vital pillar of the informal economy. In cities like Yogyakarta, over 1,300 vendors operate across 14 districts, predominantly run by individuals with only a high school education, many of whom are women aged 17 to 65, earning less than IDR 4 million per month and working long hours (6–10 hours daily) from their own modest capital. National figures suggest Indonesia's informal sector, including hawkers and micro-enterprises, accounts for over 60% of the workforce and comprises around 99% of all businesses, forming a resilient economic backbone, particularly during crises such as the COVID-19 pandemic. However, the spread of hawkers has prompted urban-management challenges. Sidewalk occupations by vendors have led to narrowed pedestrian paths, illegal parking, and litter issues, causing conflicts with the public and municipal authorities. Local governments have initiated relocation programs and regulations, such as Surabaya’s 2014 ordinance mandates designated vending zones, while Sidoarjo has attempted temporary relocations in residential areas, but these actions have seen mixed results, with income losses of up to 50% reported among relocated vendors, who often resist moves to less strategic or poorly supported sites.

==== Other countries ====
Balut is a popular dish sold by hawkers in the Philippines, Laos, Cambodia, and Vietnam. Another common food sold by hawkers in Southeast Asia is taho, which is soft tofu served with syrup. In both China and Hong Kong, hawkers' inventories often include fish ball, beef ball, butzaigo, roasted chestnuts, and stinky tofu. In Singapore, street hawking is illegal, and the term hawker is used for stall operators in government- or privately owned hawker centres. While street hawking still exists in Malaysia, hawker centres are also common.

Across Asia, stalls have been set up with little to no government monitoring. Due to health concerns and other liability problems, the food culture has been seriously challenged in Indonesia, though without marked success. In Hong Kong, the lease versus licensed hawker restrictions have put a burden on this mobile food culture. The term jau gwei (literally: running from ghosts) has been used to describe vendors often running away from local police.

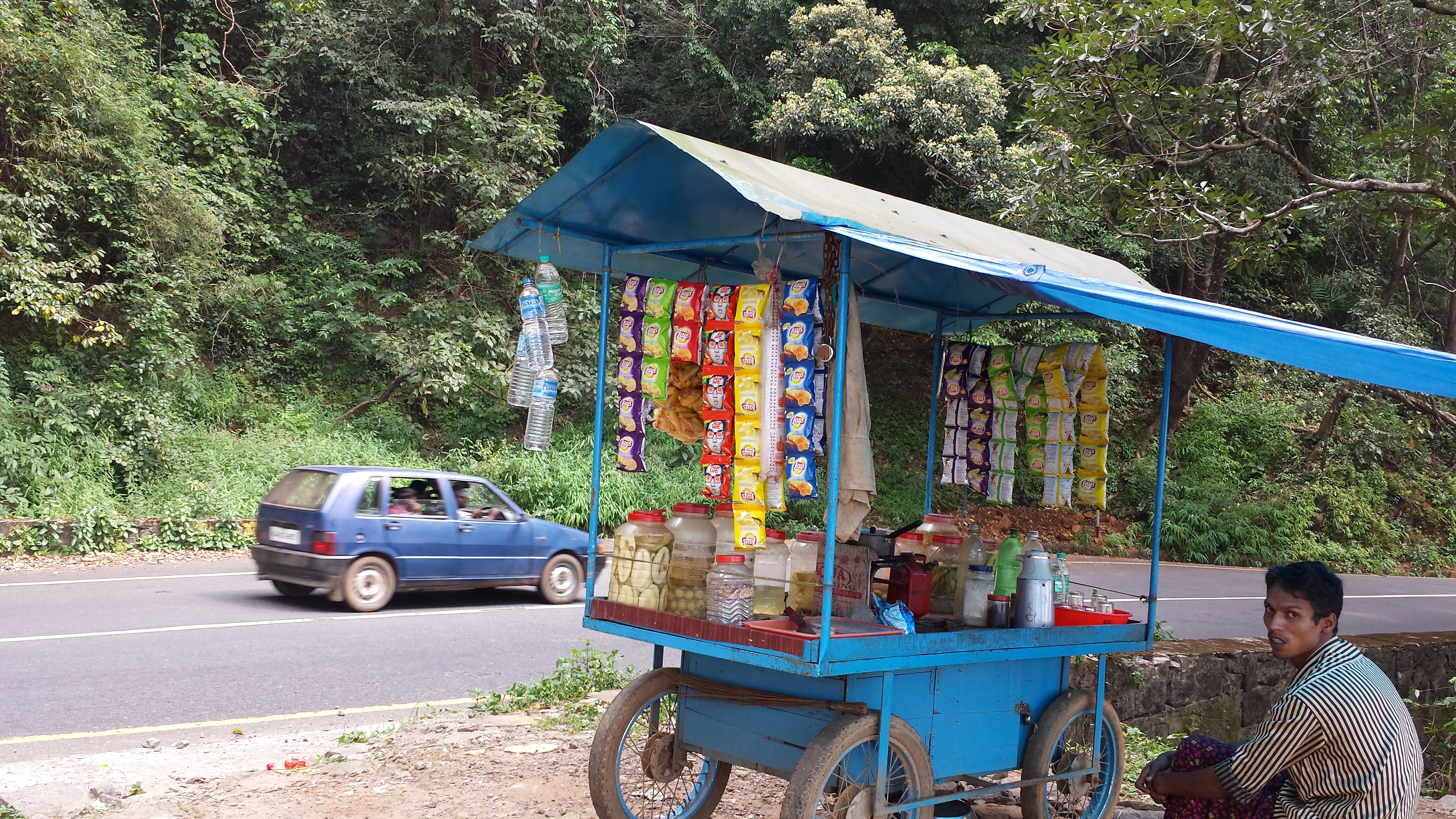
A cart hawker in Wayanad, India

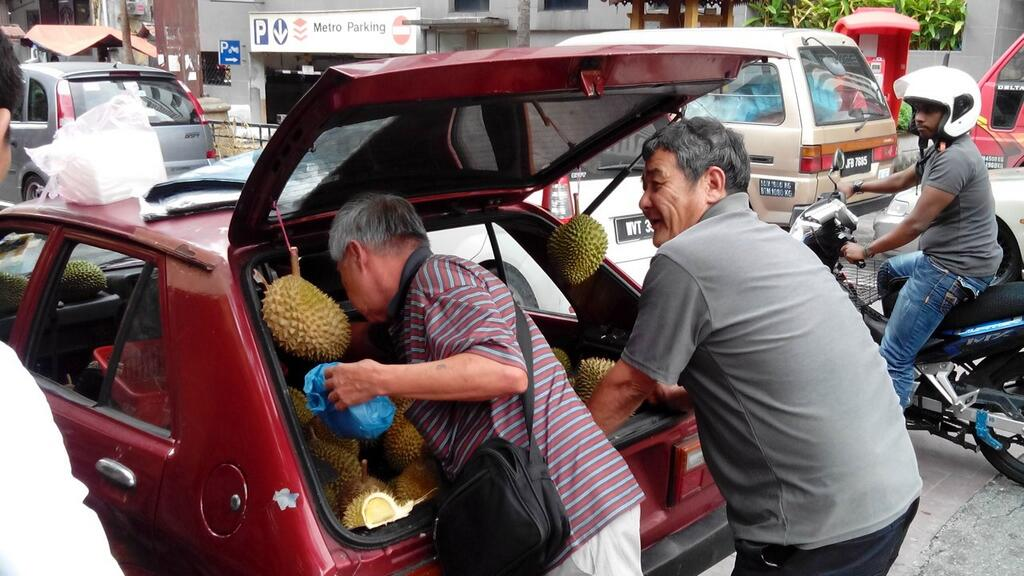
Street vendors selling durians out of a car in Johor Bahru, Malaysia

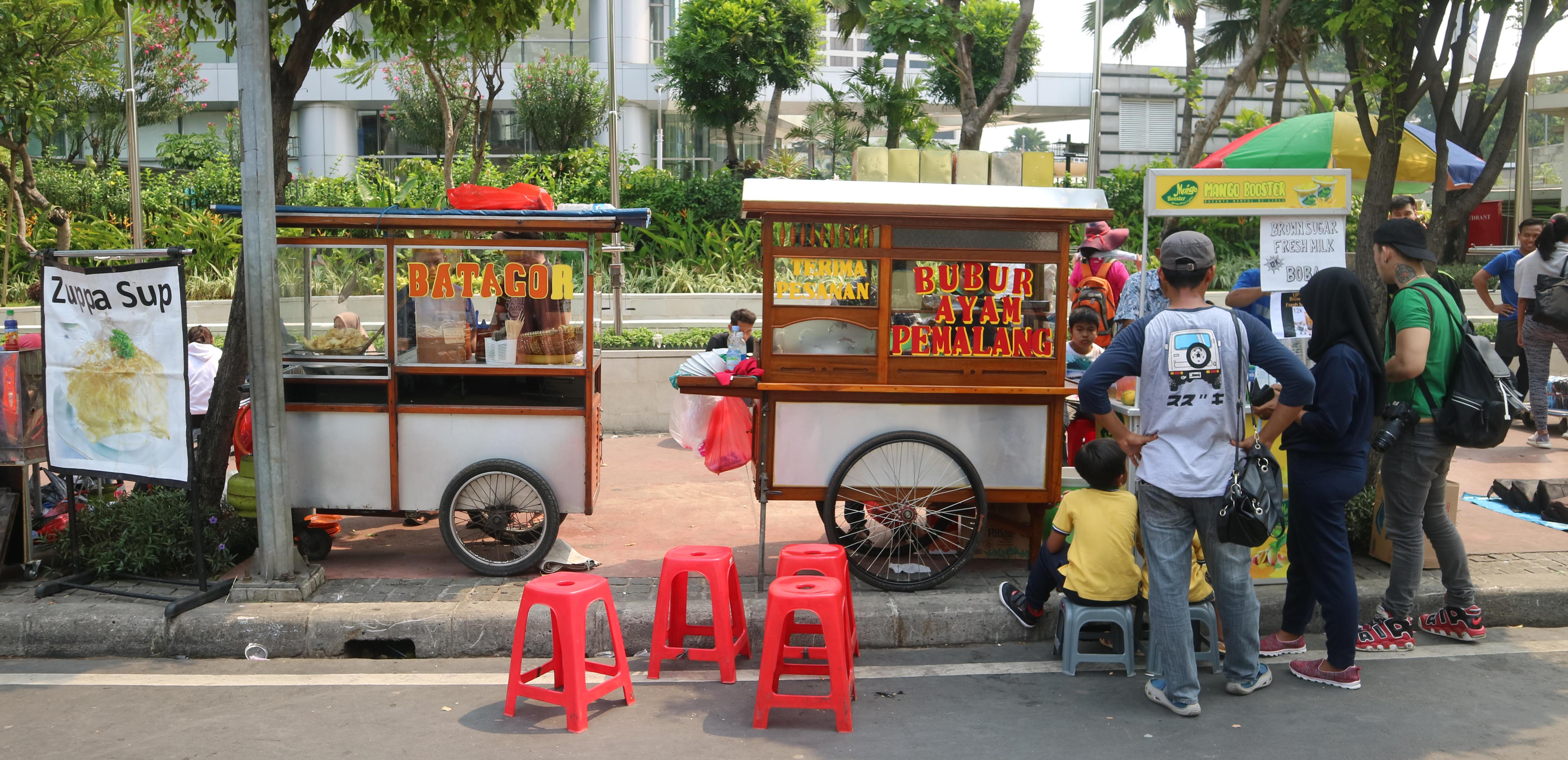
Cart hawkers selling Indonesian cuisine in Jakarta, Indonesia

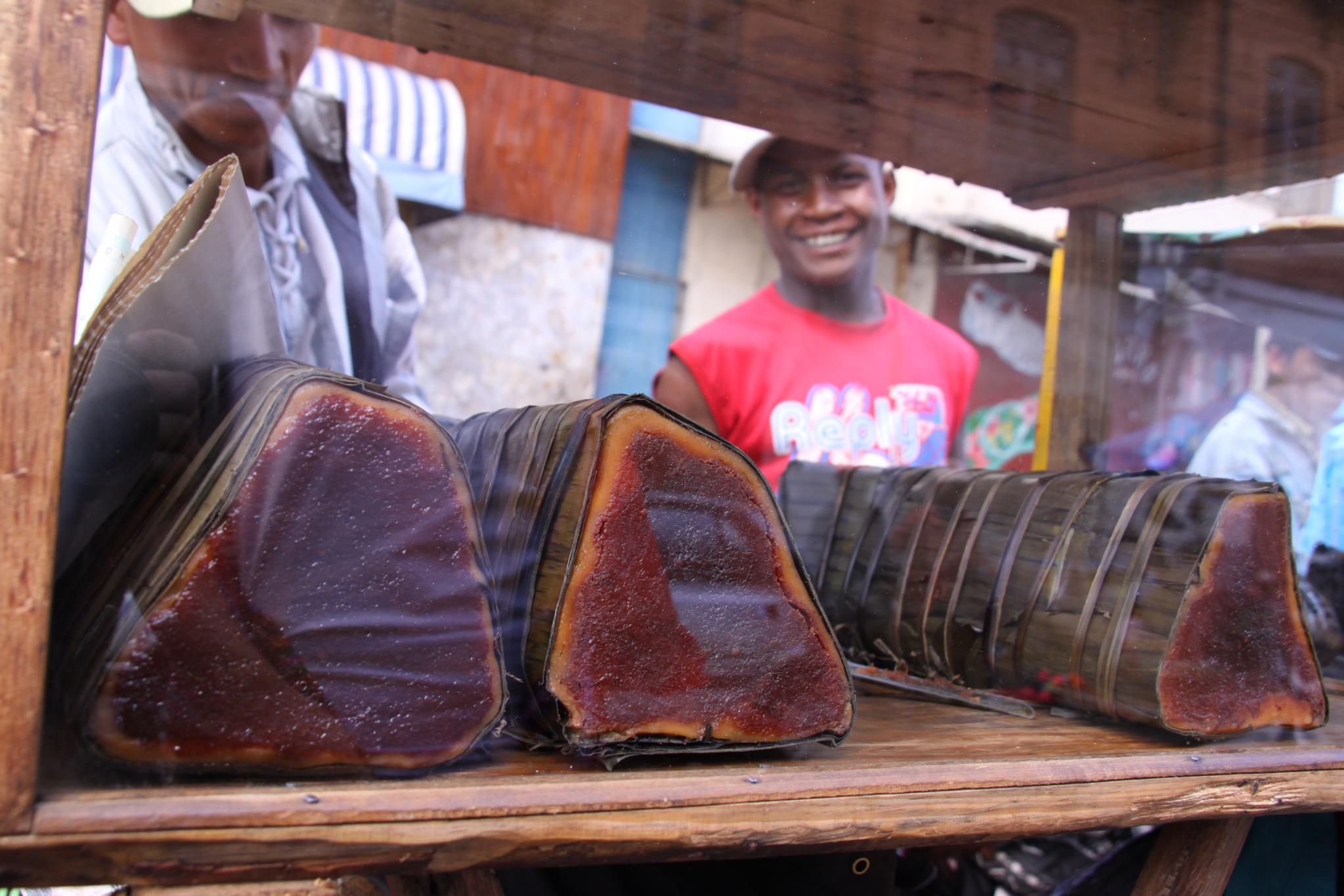
Vendors in Antananarivo, Madagascar selling koba.

=== Europe ===
==== Victorian London ====
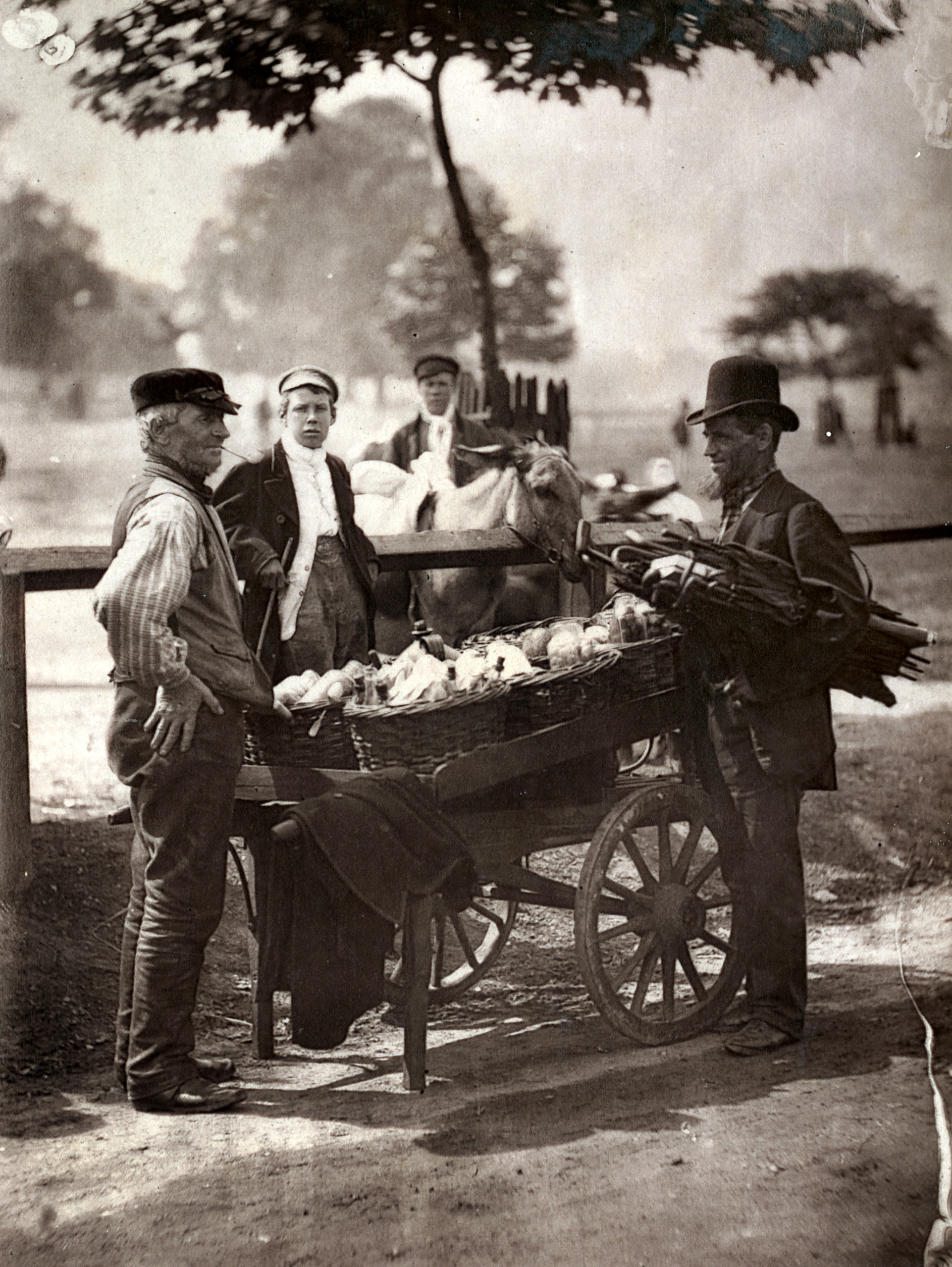
Ginger beer sold in Hampstead, north London in 1877. Photograph in Street Life in London.

The costermongers of London, England were at their peak in the 19th century. Organised, yet semi-obvious, they were ubiquitous, and their street cries could be heard everywhere. The soft drinks company, R. White's Lemonade, began in 1845 with Robert and Mary White selling their drinks around south London in a wheelbarrow. Muffin men, a type of hawker who would travel door to door selling English muffins as a snack bread, also became common in 19th century London.

=== Latin America and Caribbean ===
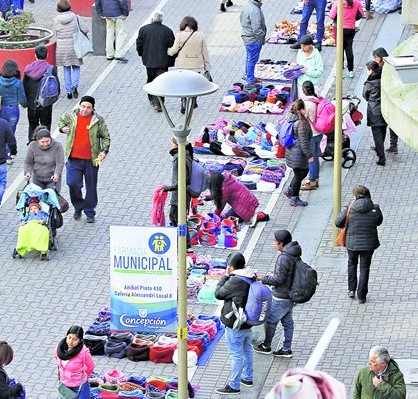
Chilean vendedores ambulantes in Concepción.

Street vendors in Latin America are known in local Spanish and Portuguese variously as vendedores ambulantes ("mobile vendors") or simply ambulantes, a term also used in Italy. In Argentina they are known as manteros. In Brazil, they are also known as "camelôs". Some ambulantes set up in a fixed location while others are mobile. Some ambulantes sell their goods door-to-door. Puestos are market stalls or stands.

Street vendors face various regulations and fees.

There are sometimes disputes between established merchants and ambulantes. Bribes are also a problem. Many vendors operate illegally. In order to avoid overwhelming tourists or shoppers, ambulantes are known to establish territories and limit their numbers. Thieves stealing their goods can be a problem.

==== Argentina ====
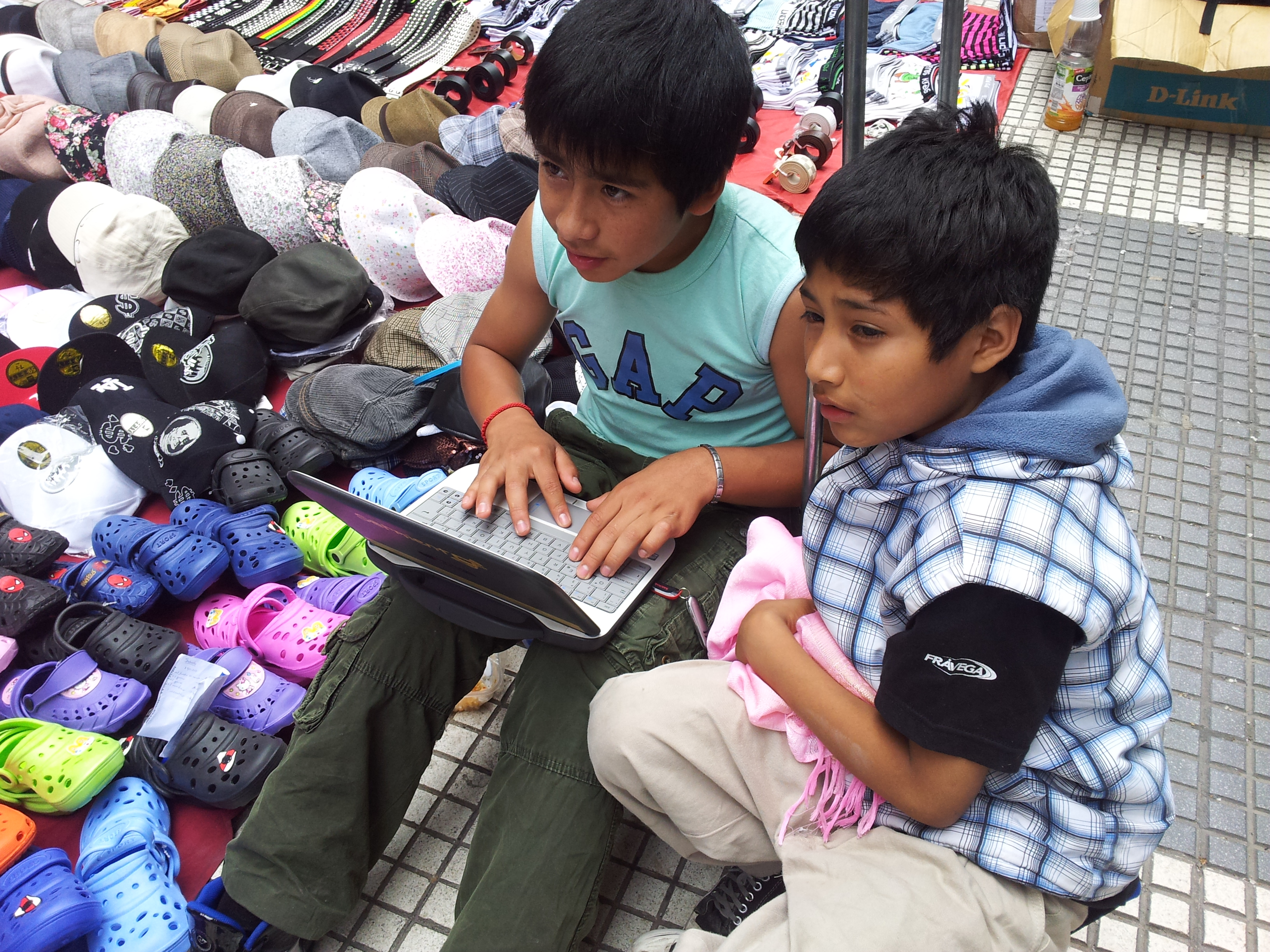
Two Argentine children working as "manteros" at the Florida Street.

The street vendors in Argentina are known as manteros, after the Spanish word for blanket, manta. They sell varied products in an informal way, in most cases placing them over a blanket. They are, in their most part, illegal immigrants without documents and victims of human trafficking, subject to forced labor. They work at the sidewalks of locations with an important daily traffic, such as the Once railway station, the Retiro railway station, and the Florida Street. This commerce poses an illegal competition with the regular retail shops. The shops at the Avellaneda street estimated that the presence of manteros would make them lose 200 million pesos in the Christmas and holiday season.

According to the Confederación Argentina de la Mediana Empresa (CAME), as of December 2013 there were 463 manteros working in Once, 16.8% of the total in Buenos Aires. The daily sales of manteros are worth 300 million pesos in Buenos Aires, and 52 million in Once. A single mantero may earn between 2,000 and 3,500 in a day. The manteros are helped by retail shops at other locations, which store their products in the night, even if not allowed to work as warehouses.

The government of Buenos Aires usually attempts to eradicate the manteros with police raids, removing them from the sidewalks and seizing their products. The police also made 35 successful search and seizures at illegal warehouses in January 2014. However, despite this operation, manteros return days, even hours, after the raids. Still, the government attempts to weaken the organizations that back the manteros with constant raids. The manteros reacts to the raids with common demonstrations.

==== Brazil ====
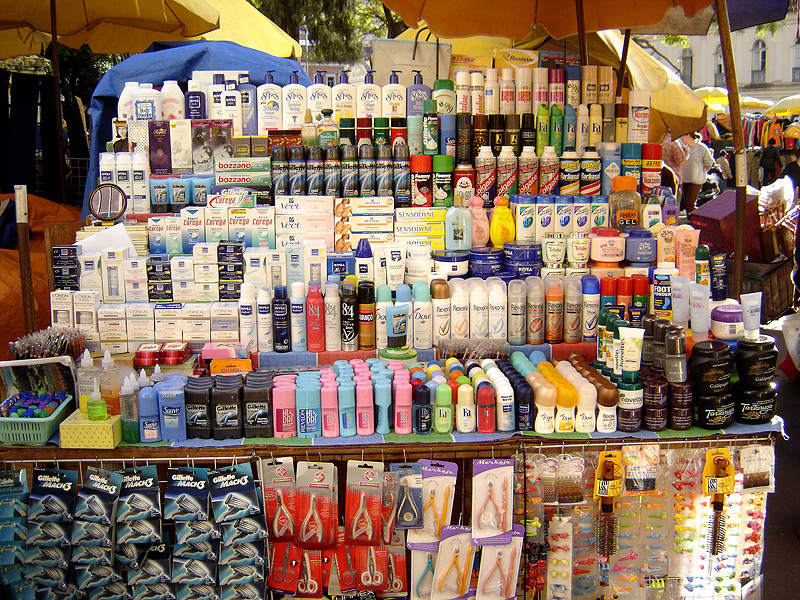
Camelô stand in Porto Alegre, Brazil

Camelô is a Brazilian Portuguese name given to street vendors in major Brazilian cities.

Law enforcement often enters into conflict – sometimes physical – with camelôs, for selling low-quality products (often imported from Asia), making improper use of public space (blocking sidewalks and pedestrian traffic), and for not paying the same taxes that licensed retailers pay. Their presence is considered to be a result of the alarming rise in unemployment, although their lifestyle might be better referred to as "subemployment." Many people who work as camelôs sell their products knowing that they are of low quality, and charge high prices nonetheless.

The word is borrowed from the French camelot, meaning "merchant of low-quality goods", and the term marreteiro is also sometimes used. The difference between camelôs and so-called "ambulantes" is that camelôs have fixed "storefronts" on a particular sidewalk, whereas "ambulantes" sell their wares throughout an area.

==== Caribbean ====
In the English-speaking Caribbean, hawkers are commonly referred to as hagglers or informal commercial importers. They sell items in small roadside stands, public transit hubs, or other places where consumers would want items such as snacks, cigarettes, phone cards, or other less expensive items. Higglers often break larger items into small individual consumable portions for re-sale and use. Buying these items from more traditional vendors, farmers, or merchants for re-sale via their informal network in communities.

==== Cuba ====
In Cuban music and Latin American music, a pregón (announcement or street-seller's cry) is a type of song based on the hawking by street vendor of their goods ("canto de los vendedores ambulantes").

==== Guatemala ====
In Antigua, women, many from the Maya (including Kaqchikel people) and Ladino ethnic groups, peddle handicrafts. Some sell textiles such a po't (blouses) and su't.

==== Mexico ====
The presence of street vendors in Mexico City dates to the pre-Hispanic era and the government has struggled to control it, with the most recent clearing of downtown streets of vendors occurring in 2007. Still, there is a persistent presence of many thousands illegally. In 2003 it was estimated that there were 199,328 street vendors in Mexico City.

In Oaxaca, Mexico there are many tortilla vendors. In Oaxaca the term regatones (hagglers) is used for those who buy goods to resell for a profit.

==== Peru ====
In Peru, water cannon were used against the ambulantes in Arequipa, Peru. Many of the ambulantes come from rural areas to sell their goods including prickly pear cactus, bordados (embroideries) and polleras (embroidered skirts).

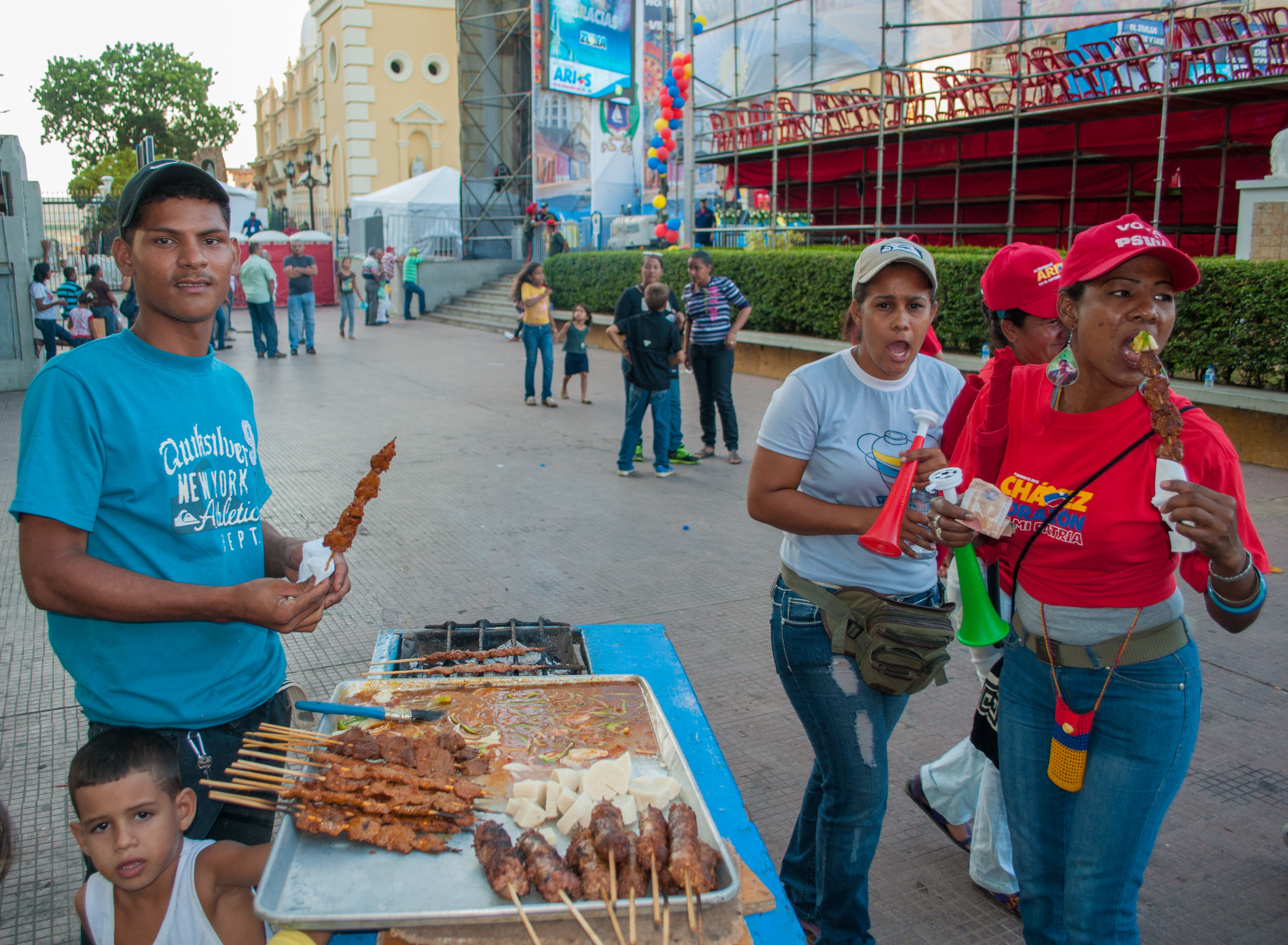
Vendor of parrilla in Maracaibo, Venezuela

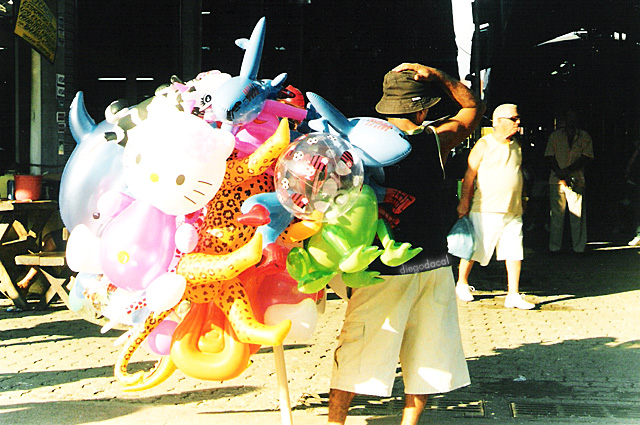
"Camelô" in Rio, Brazil

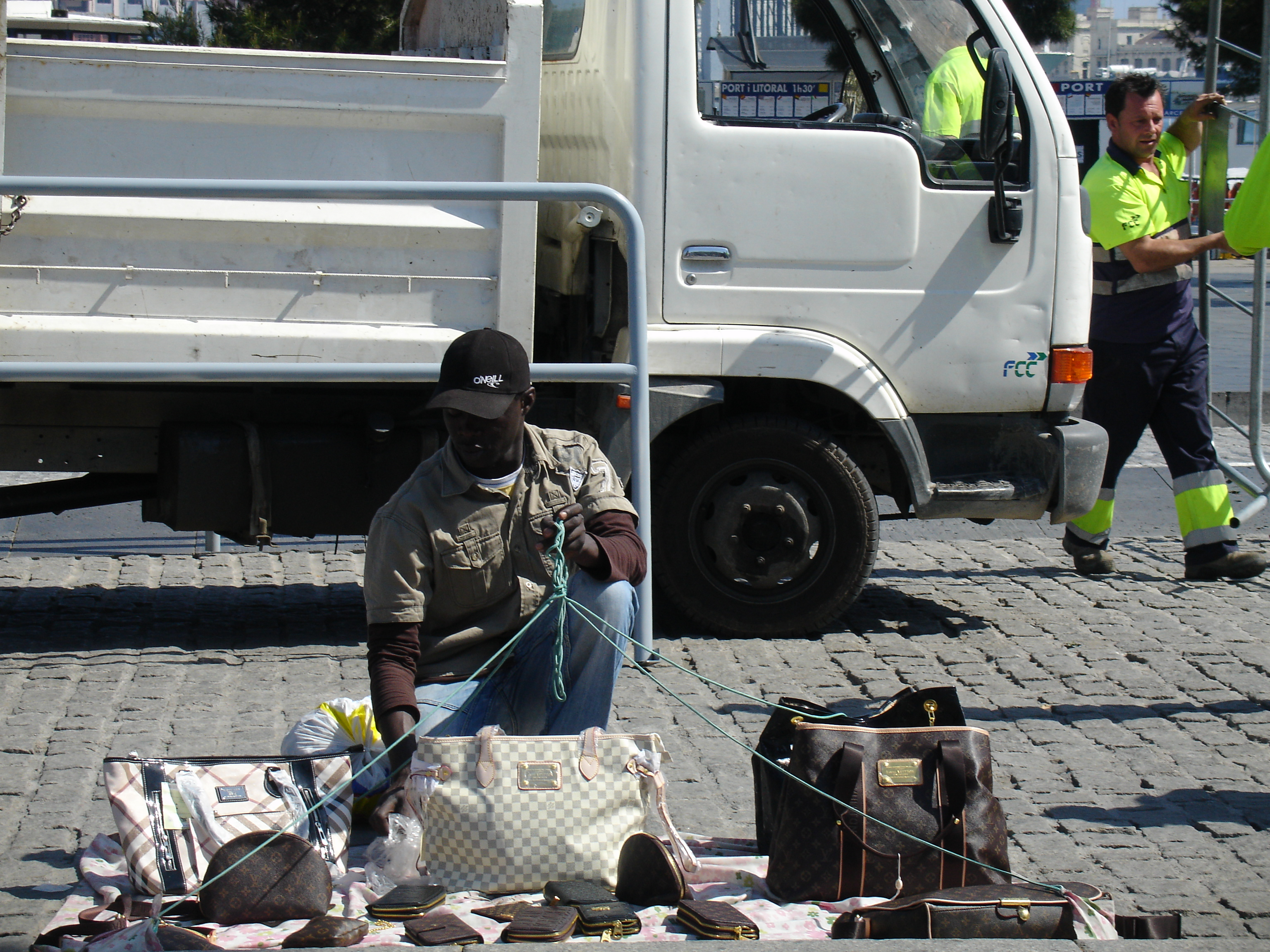
Street vendor with a string and sheet set-up allowing for quick departure.

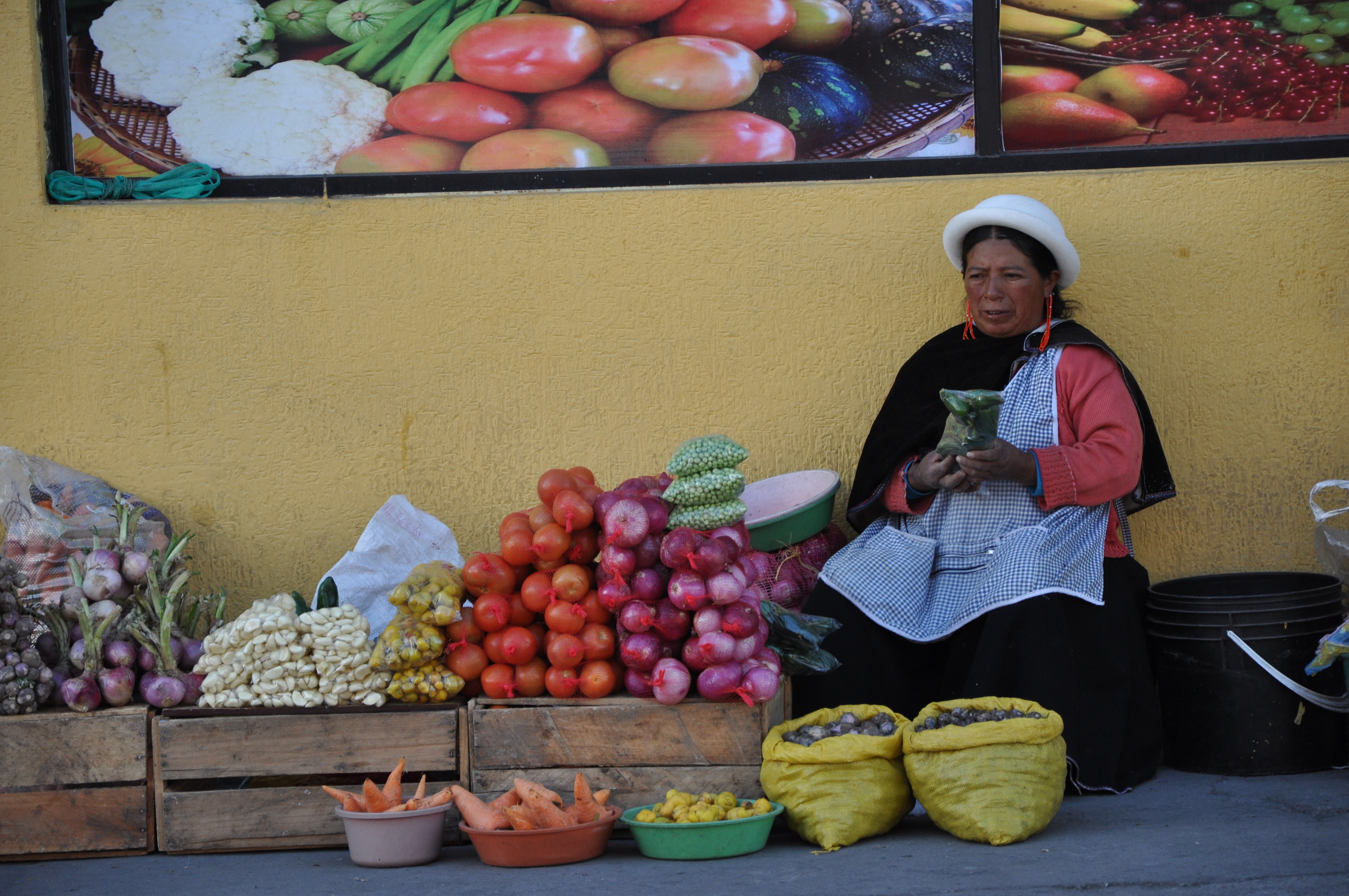
Street vendor

=== North America ===
In large cities across North America, particularly in New York City, hawkers are commonly known as street vendors, who sell snack items, such as deep-fried bananas, cotton candy, fried noodles, beverages like bubble tea, and ice cream, along with non-edible items, such as jewelry, clothes, books, and paintings. Hawkers are also found selling various items to fans at a sports venue; more commonly, this person is simply referred to as a stadium vendor.

In the early 20th century, a street corner hawker of hot potatoes and pies could be referred to as an all-hot man.

== See also ==
- Arabber
- Bazaar
- Costermonger
- Disabled veteran street vendors
- Door-to-door
- Food truck
- Hawker centre (Asia) a centre where street food is sold
- Hawkers in Hong Kong
- Hawkers in Kolkata
- Ice cream van
- Peddler
- Retail
- Street food
