= Guest Keen Williams =

Indian engineering firm

GKW Limited
- Formerly: Guest, Keen, Williams, Limited
- Type: Public
- Traded as: BSE: 504704; NSE: GKWLIMITED
- ISIN: INE528A01020
- Industry: Industrials
- Founded: 1931
- Headquarters: Howrah, India
- Key people: Chairman: K K Bangur Whole-time Director & CFO: Amitabha Chakrabarti
- Products: Warehousing solutions, logistics services, investment management
- Revenue: ▲₹327.8 million (TTM)
- Net income: ▼₹−184.69 million (TTM)
- Number of employees: 15
- Website: www.gkwltd.com

Guest, Keen, Williams, Limited is an Indian engineering firm started in Howrah, West Bengal in the 1920s by Henry William.

== Core business ==
Its main business was manufacturing nuts and fasteners in collaboration with GKN (Guest Keen and Nettlefolds of Birmingham). Later the company went on to become a major manufacturing and engineering enterprise in Howrah and Kolkata (Calcutta). The company's main manufacturing facility is still located at Currie Road in Howrah and its registered office at Shakespeare Sarani in Kolkata, West Bengal.

== Company Divisions ==
The company had four operating divisions: precision pressing division, steel division, fastener division, and engineering and forging division. The Precision pressing division made precision presswork for electrical, automotive, and textile industries stampings and strip would cores for electrical industry. The Steel division made electrically melted alloy steels, rolled and bright bars. The Fasteners division made bolts, nuts, screws and other fasteners. Engineering and forging division produces drop upset and press forgings.

In 1991 the name of the company was changed from Guest Keen William Ltd., to GKW Ltd. Later GKW became involved in making points and crossings for Indian Railways, and also in making stampings for motors, etc.

== Decline ==
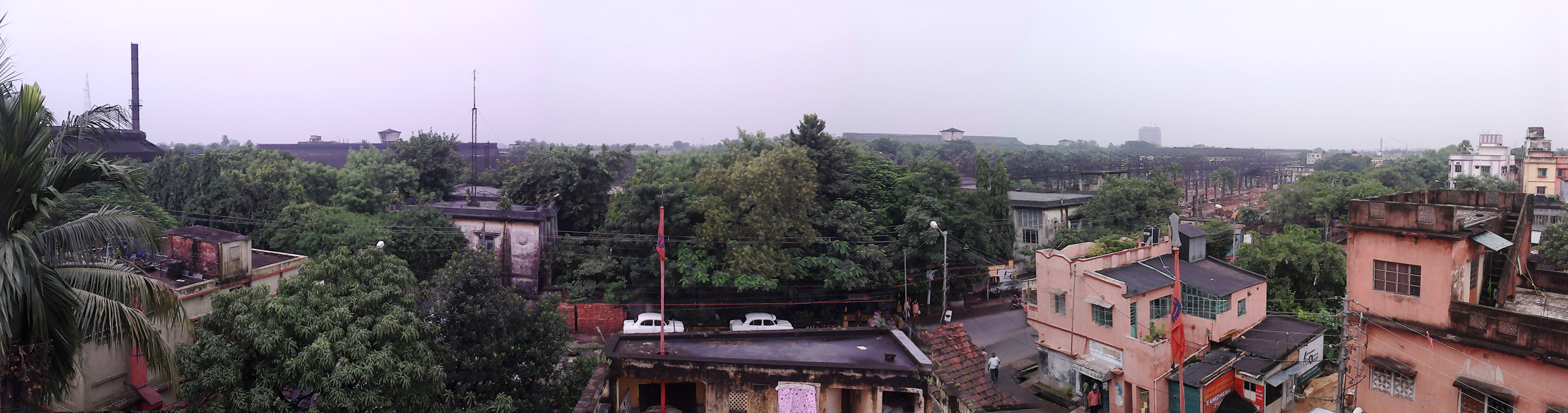
Guest Keen Williams - Howrah factory area. It is being dismantled in 2011.

All the divisions of the company were affected due to the industrial slowdown in the capital goods industry in the 1990s and the company continued to lose market due to sluggish demand and was eventually referred to Board for Industrial and Financial Reconstruction (BFIR).

The company laid off majority of its work force at its Currie Road unit at Howrah and remained locked-out until date. In 2004, GKW Ltd delisted itself from Calcutta & Mumbai Stock Exchanges. It is currently listed only at the National Stock Exchange of India. Currently the company's operations elsewhere in India remain downsized considerably, but it still manufactures fasteners and safety pins from an antique factory in Bhandup, Mumbai.
