= Calcutta Hawkers' Men Union =

Trade union in India

Calcutta Hawkers' Men Union is a trade union of hawkers in Kolkata. CHMU was founded in 1971. CHMU is affiliated to All India Trade Union Congress. Its membership is mainly based amongst food vendors.
