= Currie Road =

Traffic juncture in West Bengal, India

Currie Road is an important traffic juncture located in South of Howrah district in West Bengal, India.

It connects NH31, NH2 and Santragachhi with Vidyasagar Setu via Kona Expressway and also connects Grand Trunk Road with Sarat Chatterjee Road. Everyday millions of commuters either use or pass through this junction.

The West Bengal Secretariat Building "Nabanna" is in less than 500 meters and River Hooghly flows in less than 2km from bus stop.
