= Bengal Hawkers Association =

Trade union in India

BHA B.B.D. Bagh-Brabourne Rd. branch

The Bengal Hawkers Association is a trade union of hawkers in West Bengal, India. It is affiliated with the Trade Union Coordination Centre. It was founded in 1950 and is the oldest hawkers' union in the state. It gained a strong following amongst refugees from East Pakistan.
