= Industrial sickness =

In India, multi-year major losses in industrial companies

In Indian law, industrial sickness is a category for severely underperforming, loss-making industrial companies.

== Definition ==
The Sick Industrial Companies (Special Provisions) Act, 1985 defines a "sick industrial company" as "an industrial company (being a company registered for not less than five years) which has at the end of any financial year accumulated losses equal to or exceeding its entire net worth".
