= Gurugram Metro =

Based on a consensus to split the Rapid Metro article - there are multiple new lines

Overview
- Owner: Gurgaon Metro Rail Corporation
- Area served: Gurgaon
- Transit type: Rapid Transit
- Number of lines: 1
- Line number: Rapid Metro
- Number of stations: 11
- Daily ridership: 52,000 (2025)
- Headquarters: Gurugram Metro Rail Limited (GMRL), HMRTC Depot 2, Near AIT Chowk, Golf Course Road, Sector 52-53, Gurugram, Haryana 122011

Operation
- Began operation: 14 November 2013; 13 years ago
- Operators: Delhi Metro Rail Corporation, transiting to GMRL
- Character: Elevated
- Train length: 3 coaches
- Headway: 10-15 minutes (Morning/Evening Peak hour - 3 min)

Technical
- System length: 12.85 km (7.98 mi)
- Track gauge: 1,435 mm (4 ft 8 1/2 in) standard gauge
- Electrification: 25 kV 50 Hz AC overhead catenary
- Top speed: 80 km/h (50 mph)

The Gurugram Metro is a rapid transit system serving the city of Gurugram in Haryana, India. The metro network consists of one operational line (Rapid Metro), with a total length of 12.85 kilometres (7.98 mi) serving 11 stations, all of them elevated. Line 2 of the Gurgaon Metro is under construction since 2025. The system uses standard-gauge tracks.

The system is connected to Delhi Metro at Sikanderpur by a footbridge. A second connection to the Delhi Metro is underway at Millennium City Centre as part of the under-construction Line 2.

== History ==
Gurugram Metro Rail Limited (GMRL), a 50:50 Joint Venture (JV) Company of Government of India (GoI) and Government of Haryana (GoH), was created in February 2024 to develop what is now Line-2 of the Gurugram Metro. GMRL also owns the Rapid Metro since 2024, with operations being transitioned from Delhi Metro Rail Corporation to GMRL to manage rising ridership.

The first phase of the Rapid Metro opened on 14 November 2013. The second phase began commercial operation on 31 March 2017. In September 2019, IL&FS announced that it did not have the resources to continue running the Rapid Metro due to financial issues with the company and was looking for another entity to fund and take over operations. After a short dispute with the Haryana government and a court ruling from the Punjab and Haryana High Court, the Delhi Metro Rail Corporation took over the operation of the line from IL&FS.

== Construction phases ==
The metro network in Gurugram, Haryana, has been developed through two separate rapid transit projects: the operational Rapid Metro and the new Gurugram Metro corridor. Rapid Metro was constructed in two phases between 2010 and 2017, primarily serving the DLF commercial and residential districts. The Gurugram Metro project, approved by the Government of India in June 2023, is intended to extend metro connectivity to Old Gurugram and link it with the existing rapid transit network.

=== Rapid Metro ===
The Rapid Metro is an elevated rapid transit system serving Gurugram. It was developed through a public–private partnership involving companies of the IL&FS group and the Government of Haryana. The system was constructed in two phases, with the first serving the Cyber City area and the second extending southwards towards Sector 55–56. Both phases connect with the Delhi Metro network through an interchange at Sikanderpur.

==== Phase 1 ====
The first phase of Rapid Metro comprised a 5.1 km elevated corridor connecting Sikanderpur with the DLF Cyber City commercial district. The alignment included a loop through the DLF Phase II and Phase III areas, providing connections between office complexes, commercial establishments and the Delhi Metro's Yellow Line at Sikanderpur. The phase comprised six stations, including Sikanderpur, DLF Phase II, Belvedere Towers, Cyber City, Moulsari Avenue and DLF Phase III.

Construction began in November 2010 following the execution of the concession agreement in December 2009 and financial closure in June 2010. The project included the construction of elevated viaducts, stations and associated railway infrastructure. Commercial operations commenced on 14 November 2013, initially serving five stations. The remaining station, Gateway Towers, was brought into service on 25 April 2014.

The first phase was developed by Rapid MetroRail Gurgaon Limited. The elevated alignment was designed to operate independently of road traffic while providing an interchange with the Delhi Metro at Sikanderpur. The project was formally inaugurated in December 2013, approximately one month after the commencement of passenger operations.

Phase 1 network
#	Line Name	Terminals		Stations	Length	Opening Date
1	Rapid Metro	Sikanderpur	DLF Phase 3	5	5.85 km (3.64 mi)	14 November 2013
Total				5	5.85 km (3.64 mi)	

==== Phase 2 ====
The second phase of Rapid Metro extended the network southwards from Sikanderpur to Sector 55–56, passing through residential and commercial areas along Golf Course Road. The approximately 6.5 km elevated extension added five stations at DLF Phase I, Sector 42–43, Sector 53–54, Sector 54 Chowk and Sector 55–56. The extension increased the network to approximately 11.7 km with eleven stations.

The concession agreement for the second phase was signed in January 2013, followed by financial closure in July 2013. Construction began in September 2013 and included elevated viaducts, passenger stations and supporting railway infrastructure. The extension was developed by Rapid MetroRail Gurgaon South Limited, another company associated with the IL&FS group.

Passenger services on the extension commenced on 31 March 2017. The second phase provided metro connectivity to additional residential and commercial areas of Gurugram, particularly those located along Golf Course Road, while retaining interchange access to the Delhi Metro network at Sikanderpur.

Following financial and operational disputes involving the original concessionaires, the Haryana Mass Rapid Transport Corporation assumed responsibility for the system in October 2019. Operations were entrusted to the Delhi Metro Rail Corporation (DMRC).

Phase 2 network
#	Line Name	Terminals		Stations	Length	Opening Date
1	Rapid Metro	Gurugram Sector 55–56	Sikanderpur	6	7 km (4.3 mi)	31 March 2017
Total				6	7 km (4.3 mi)	

=== Gurugram Metro ===
The Gurugram Metro is a separate rapid transit system being developed by Gurugram Metro Rail Limited (GMRL). On 7 June 2023, the Union Cabinet approved the construction of a 28.5 km metro corridor connecting Millennium City Centre, formerly HUDA City Centre, with Cyber City, including a spur towards Dwarka Expressway. The approved project comprises 27 elevated stations, including 26 stations along the main corridor and one station on the spur.

The main corridor has a sanctioned length of 26.65 km, while the Dwarka Expressway spur is 1.85 km long. The project was approved at an original estimated completion cost of ₹5,452.72 crore, which was subsequently revised to ₹10,266.54 crore (US$1.1 billion). It is designed as a standard-gauge metro system, with a track gauge of 1,435 mm, and is intended to improve connectivity between Old and New Gurugram.

Construction of the corridor is being undertaken in two principal civil works phases, with the first extending from Millennium City Centre to Sector 9 and the second continuing from Sector 9 to Cyber City. Separate works are also planned for the metro depot, utility relocation and other supporting infrastructure.

==== Phase 1 ====
The first phase of Gurugram Metro covers the section between Millennium City Centre and Sector 9, together with a spur from the Basai Village area towards Sector 101 near Dwarka Expressway. The alignment passes through several residential, commercial and industrial areas, including Sector 45, Cyber Park, Sector 47, Subhash Chowk, Sector 48, Sector 72A, Hero Honda Chowk, Udyog Vihar Phase VI, Sector 10, Sector 37 and Basai Village.

The phase includes the construction of elevated viaducts, stations and associated civil infrastructure. The alignment is intended to provide a metro connection between Millennium City Centre, commercial areas around Subhash Chowk and Hero Honda Chowk, and residential and industrial localities in western Gurugram. The spur towards Dwarka Expressway forms part of the approved corridor and provides connectivity to the Sector 101 area.

Civil construction works for the first phase were awarded in 2025. Construction commenced in September 2025, with works including site preparation, utility relocation, foundation construction and the development of elevated metro infrastructure. The project also provides for a connection to the proposed depot at Sector 33.

As of October 2026, Phase 1 was under construction. The corridor is intended to provide interchange connectivity with the Delhi Metro at Millennium City Centre and form the first section of the new metro route through Old Gurugram.

Phase 1 network
#	Line Name	Terminals		Stations	Length	Status	Opening Date
1	Line 2	Millennium City Centre	Sector 9	14	15.3 km (9.5 mi)	Under Construction	2029
Total				14	15.3 km (9.5 mi)		

==== Phase 2 ====
The second phase extends from Sector 9 to Cyber City through the northern and western parts of Old Gurugram. The proposed alignment passes through Sector 7, Sector 4, Sector 5, Ashok Vihar, Sector 3, Bajghera Road, Palam Vihar Extension, Palam Vihar, Sector 23A, Sector 22, Udyog Vihar Phase IV and Udyog Vihar Phase V before reaching Cyber City.

The section is intended to provide metro connectivity to established residential neighbourhoods, commercial districts and employment centres that are not directly served by the existing Rapid Metro network. At Cyber City, the new corridor is planned to connect with the existing Rapid Metro system, allowing interchange between the two networks.

The civil works package includes the construction of elevated viaducts and stations along the Sector 9–Cyber City alignment. The project also involves traffic management, relocation of existing utilities and the development of supporting infrastructure along roads through Old Gurugram.

On 5 October 2026, GMRL issued a tender for the construction of the elevated viaduct and stations from Sector 9, exclusive, to Cyber City, inclusive. A separate tender for utility shifting and traffic diversion works was issued on 12 October 2026. The civil works tender was scheduled to close for bid submissions in November 2026.

As of 23 October 2026, Phase 2 remained in the tendering stage, with the main civil construction contract yet to be awarded. Upon completion, the section will connect with Phase 1 at Sector 9, forming a continuous metro corridor between Millennium City Centre and Cyber City.

Phase 2 network
#	Line Name	Terminals		Stations	Length	Status	Opening Date
1	Line 2	Sector 9	Cyber City	13	14.2 km (8.8 mi)	Approved	TBD
Total				13	14.2 km (8.8 mi)		

=== Planned lines ===
The Haryana Mass Rapid Transit Corporation (HMRTC) has plans to build the additional metro network spanning 188 kilometers in Gurugram. Gurugram Metro Rail Limited (GMRL) will be responsible for constructing, maintaining, and operating this metro line, similar to the Delhi Metro Rail Corporation. Currently, all these lines will be developed in the first phase, with further expansion planned in the second/upcoming phase.

Gurugram Metro Network Plan
Region connected	Starting Station	Terminal Station	Route Length (km)	Construction Start (Planned)	Comments
Gurugram-Delhi (West Gurugram)	Yashobhoomi Dwarka Sector - 25 metro station	Rajiv Chowk	20	2027	Airport Express Line (Delhi Metro) (Yashobhoomi Dwarka Sector - 25 metro station) to Gurugram IFFCO Chowk will connect Gurugram to IGI Airport and Bijwasan Railway station. DPR submitted by DMRC in June 2026, under the consideration of Ministry of Housing and Urban Affairs.
Gurugram-Delhi (West Gurugram)	Dwarka Sector 21	Gurugram Rezga la Chowk	8.2	2027	Gurugram (from Rezang La Chowk in Palam Vihar to IGI Airport (IICC - Dwarka Sector 25 metro station)) - proposed: connect Gurugram Loop to IGI Airport by connecting Palam Vihar to Delhi Airport Metro Express (Orange Line) at existing IICC - Dwarka Sector 25 metro station (India International Convention and Expo Centre) which also connects to Blue Line at Dwarka Sector 21 metro station). It will likely be a nearly 6 km extension of Orange Line from IICC Dwarka to Bamnoli Chowk (southeast end of IICC), Nykaa village, Bijwasan railway station (BWSN), Gurugram Sector-51 and connect to Gurugram metro network near Palam Vihar Halt railway station (PLVR). DPR submitted by HMRTC in June 2026, under the consideration of Ministry of Housing and Urban Affairs.
Gurugram-Faridabad-Greater Noida RRTS	IFFCO Chowk	Greater Noida	64	2027	This Namo Bharat will directly connect the major cities of Gurugram, Faridabad, Noida and Greater Noida. An integration with Metro services has been proposed in both Gurugram and Faridabad, operating on the same infrastructure as Namo Bharat. This 64 km long corridor is proposed to have 7 Namo Bharat stations and 15 Metro stations.
Gurugram-only (South)	Sector 56	Pachgaon Kmp Interchange	36	2029	Manesar-Pachgaon (Western Peripheral Expressway interchange) to Gurugram Sector-56-Vatika Chowk via eastern New Gurugram The DPR for 35.5 km extension from existing Gurugram Rapid Metro Sector 55–56 metro station to Pachgaon (Manesar), with 28 new stations (sector 61, 62, 66, Vatika Chowk, 69, 70, 75, Kherki Daula, 36ए, 88, 84, 85, 89, 86, 90, 91, M-15, M-14, M-9, M-9, M-P), was ready in September 2025.
Gurugram-Delhi (West Gurugram)	Kherki Daula dwarka expressway cloverleaf	Sector 111	25	2029	Ridership assessment to be conducted by DMRC.
Gurugram-only (Southeast-Centralwest)	Bhondsi	Gurugram railway station	20	2029	DPR underway for 20 km Bhondsi-Gurugram Railway Station link, multiple alignments under consideration.
Gurugram-Delhi (Central Gurugram)	Manesar	Samalkha-Kapasahera Road	30	2030	Manesar to Samalkha-Kapasahera Road via Old Gurugram (New Colony Mor, Sadar Bazar, Old Delhi-Gurgaon Road) HUDA City Centre to Pachgaon (Manesar) - approved: An extension of Yellow Line, included in the Gurgaon Masterplan 2031, approved by the Haryana govt will go up to Panchgaon Chowk in Manesar, where it will interchange with Delhi–Alwar Regional Rapid Transit System, Haryana Orbital Rail Corridor (Panchgaon), Western Peripheral Expressway's Multimodal Transit Centre and Jhajjar-Palwal rail line.
Gurugram-only (East-West)	Golf Course Extension Road	Sector 5	14	2030	
Total System Length			217		

== Lines ==
=== Rapid Metro ===
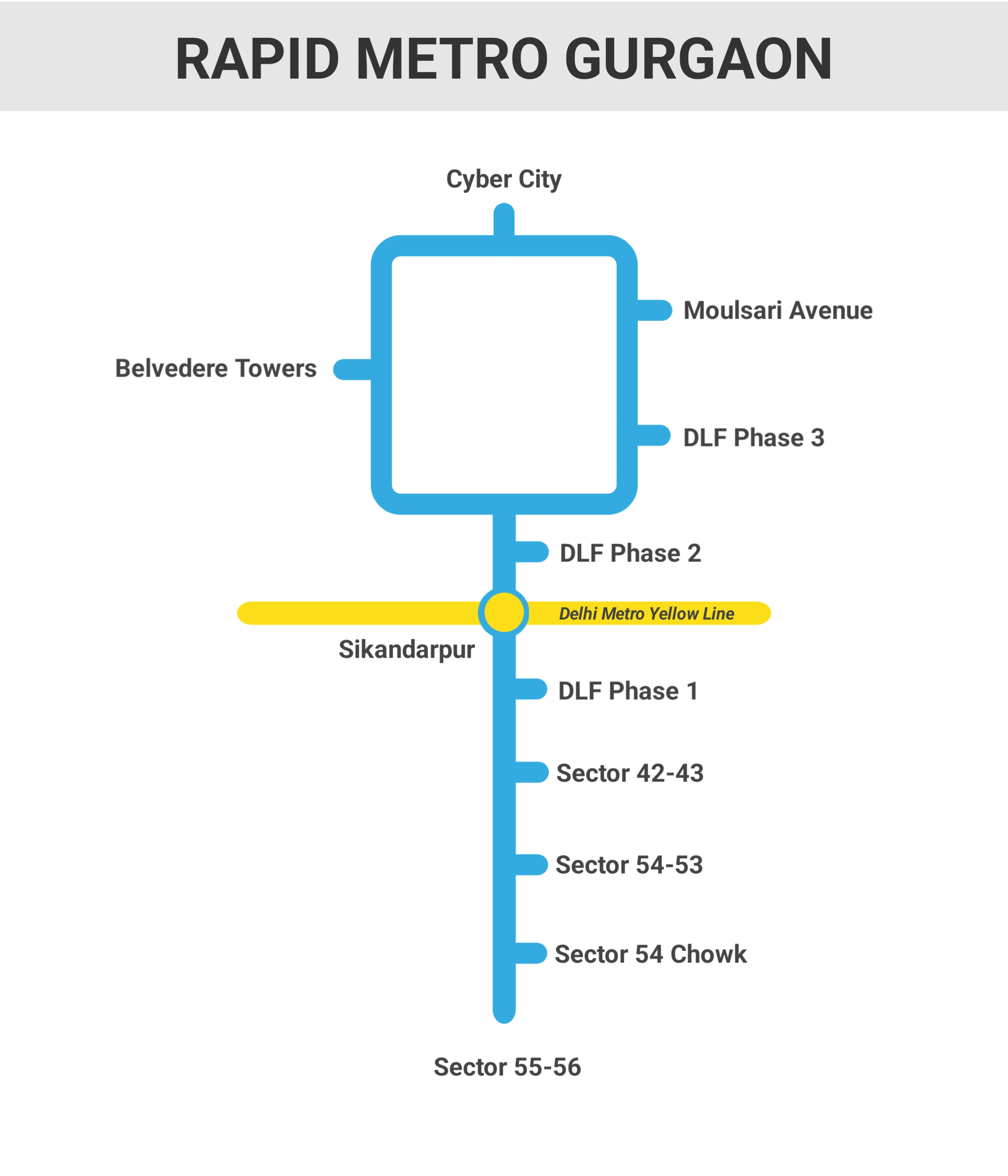
Rapid Metro Gurgaon transit diagram

Line 1 was built in two phases. The first phase of the project covers a distance of 5.1 km (3.2 mi) north of Sikanderpur. The section between Sikanderpur and DLF Phase 2 station is double-tracked, while the remaining stations are served by a single-track loop. The second phase is a 6.6 km (4.1 mi) long southward extension from Sikanderpur to Sector 55 and 56 of Gurgaon and mostly runs through the affluent Golf Course Road. This section of a line opened on 31 March 2017 partially except for two stations in its route Gurgaon Sector 53-54 and Gurgaon Sector 42-43. The two remaining stations till Sector 55-56 opened on 25 April 2017. Platforms are 75 m (246 ft) in length.

Sikanderpur station offers an interchange with Delhi Metro via a 90 m × 9 m (295 ft × 30 ft) walkway.

=== Line 2 (Under Construction) ===
The Gurugram Metro Loop Project has been approved and is partly under construction. The total length of the corridor will be about 28.80 km (17.90 mi), consisting of 27 elevated stations with six interchange stations. Phase 1 of the project has started construction, with 15 stations starting from Millennium City Centre up to Sector 101, while Phase 2 passing through Old Gurgaon up to Cyber City is under planning. The FY2025-26 Haryana Budget assigned Rs300 cr for the Rs 4556.53 cr project, while civil work commenced in November 2025.

Line 2
#	Station Name		Phase	Opening	Interchange Connenction	Station Layout	Depot Connection	Depot Layout
#	English	Hindi	Phase	Opening	Interchange Connenction	Station Layout	Depot Connection	Depot Layout
1	Millennium City Centre	मिलेनियम सिटी सेंटर गुरुग्राम	1	2028	Yellow Line	Elevated	Sector 33 Metro Depot	Elevated
2	Sector 45		1	2028	None	Elevated	None	None
3	Sector 46		1	2028	None	Elevated	None	None
4	Sector 47		1	2028	None	Elevated	None	None
5	Subhash Chowk		1	2028	None	Elevated	None	None
6	Sector 48		1	2028	None	Elevated	None	None
7	Sector 33		1	2028	None	Elevated	Sector 33 Metro Depot	None
8	Hero Honda Chowk		1	2028	Hero Honda Chowk RRTS	Elevated	None	None
9	Udyog Vihar Ph6		1	2028	None	Elevated	None	None
10	Sector 10		1	2028	None	Elevated	None	None
11	Sector 37		1	2028	None	Elevated	None	None
12	Basai		1	2028	None	Elevated	None	None
13	Sector 101		1	2028	None	Elevated	None	None
14	Sector 9		2	TBD	None	TBD	None	None
15	Sector 7		2	TBD	None	TBD	None	None
16	Sector 4		2	TBD	None	TBD	None	None
17	Sector 5		2	TBD	Indian Railways	TBD	None	None
18	Ashok Vihar		2	TBD	None	TBD	None	None
19	Sector 3		2	TBD	None	TBD	None	None
20	Bajghera Road		2	TBD	None	TBD	None	None
21	Palam Vihar Ext.		2	TBD	None	TBD	None	None
22	Palam Vihar		2	TBD	None	TBD	None	None
23	Sector 23A		2	TBD	None	TBD	None	None
24	Sector 22		2	TBD	None	TBD	None	None
25	Udyog Vihar Ph4		2	TBD	None	TBD	None	None
26	Udyog Vihar Ph5		2	TBD	None	TBD	None	None
27	Cyber City	साइबर सिटी	2	TBD	Rapid Metro	TBD	Sector 33 Metro Depot	Elevated

== Network ==
The Gurugram Metro consists of one operational line and one under-construction line. Operations of the existing Rapid Metro were transferred from DMRC to GMRL in 2024, while Line 2 is being built and will be operated by GMRL.

Gurugram Metro
No.	Line Name	Terminals		Stations	Distance (km)	Opening Date	Last Extension
1	Rapid Metro	Gurugram Sector 55–56	DLF Phase 3	11	12.85 km (7.98 mi)	14 November 2013	31 March 2017
Total				11	12.85 km (7.98 mi)		

== Infrastructure ==
=== Rolling stock ===
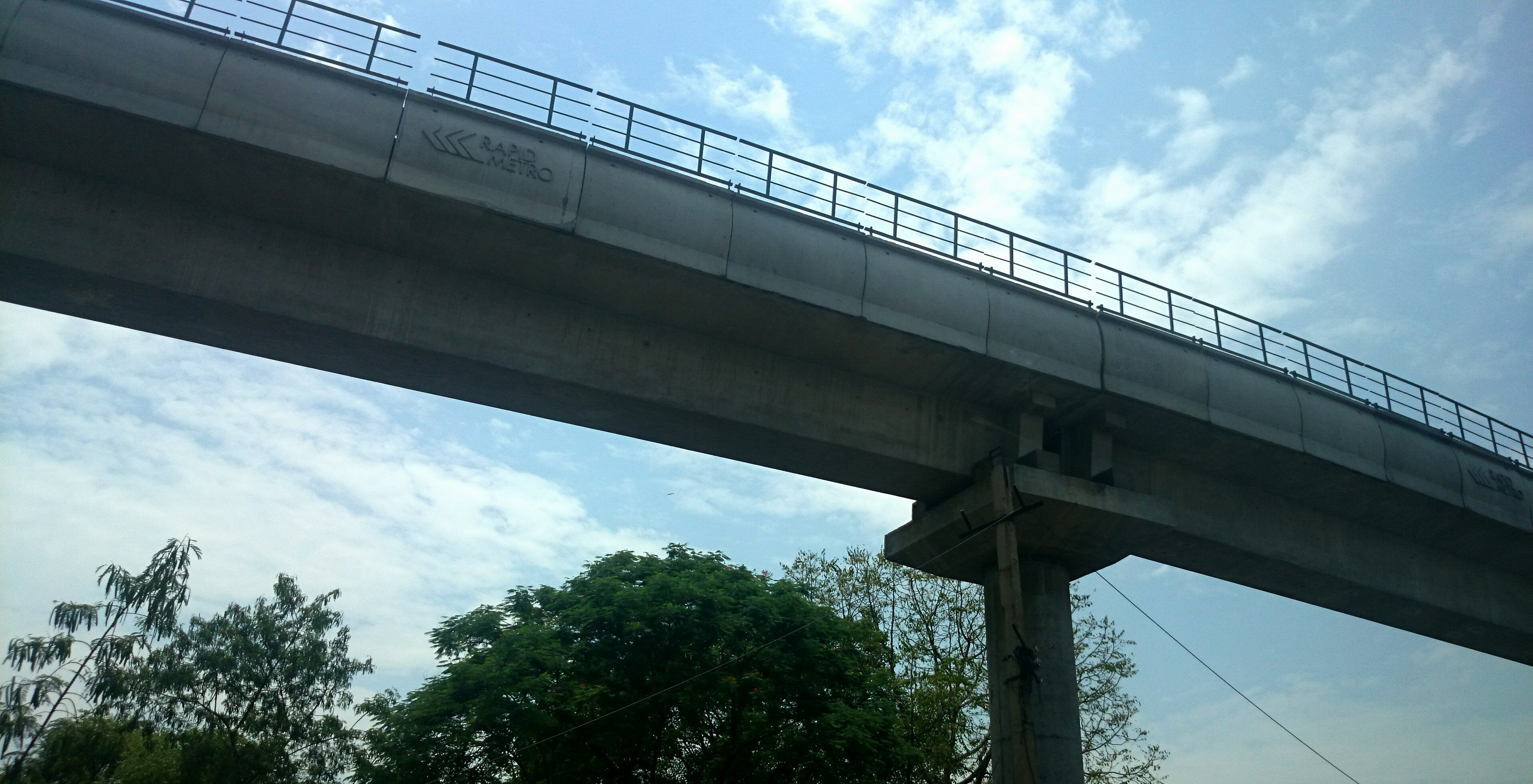
Gurgaon Metro track

On 21 April 2010, Siemens announced that it had been awarded a turnkey contract to build the Rapid Metro line, including five three-car metro trains. Siemens sub-contracted CRRC Zhuzhou Locomotive to build the 5 aluminium-bodied air-conditioned trains. The first three-coach train set built in China, arrived in Gurgaon on 11 September 2012. RMGL ordered an additional seven three-car metro train sets for the second phase expansion of the metro. The final 4 of these 7 rakes arrived in Gurgaon on 5 February 2016.

Each train with three coaches costs ₹300 million (US$3.2 million) and is silver and blue in colour. The total length of a 3 coach train is 59.94 metres (196 ft 8 in). The coaches are 2.8 metres (9 ft 2 in) wide, have roof-mounted air conditioning and have 4 doors on each side of each coach. Each train has a capacity of approximately 800 passengers. The metro is designed to carry 30,000 passengers per hour.

== Operations ==
Services on the Rapid Metro operate daily between 06:05 and 22:00 running with a headway of four minutes. The Rapid Metro line was the first in India to auction naming rights for its stations.

== See also ==
- Urban rail transit in India
  - Noida Metro
  - Delhi Metro
    - Yellow Line (Delhi Metro)
  - Rapid Metro Gurgaon
- National Capital Region (India)
  - Delhi-Alwar RRTS
  - NH-48
