= Phase 1 metro station =

Metro station in Haryana, India

DLF Phase 1

General information
- Coordinates: 28.471408°N 77.093933°E
- Owner: Haryana Mass Rapid Transport Corporation Limited (HMRTC)
- Operator: Delhi Metro Rail Corporation (DMRC)
- Platforms: Platform-1 → Sector 55–56; Platform-2 → Phase 3
- Tracks: 2

Construction
- Structure type: Elevated
- Platform levels: 2
- Accessible: Yes

Other information
- Station code: PH1

History
- Opened: 31 March 2017; 9 years ago
- Electrified: 750 V, DC via third rail

Services
Preceding station	Rapid Metro Gurgaon	Following station
Sector 42-43 towards Sector 55–56	Line 1	Sikanderpur towards Phase 3 via Moulsari Avenue
Route map
Location
- Location within Delhi Location within Haryana

DLF Phase 1 is a station of the Rapid Metro Gurgaon in Haryana, India. The station was opened to the public on 31 March 2017. It is owned by Haryana Mass Rapid Transport Corporation Limited (HMRTC) and operated by Delhi Metro Rail Corporation (DMRC). Earlier it was operated by Rapid Metro Gurgaon Limited (RMGL).
