= Cyber City metro station =

Transit station in Haryana, India

Cyber City

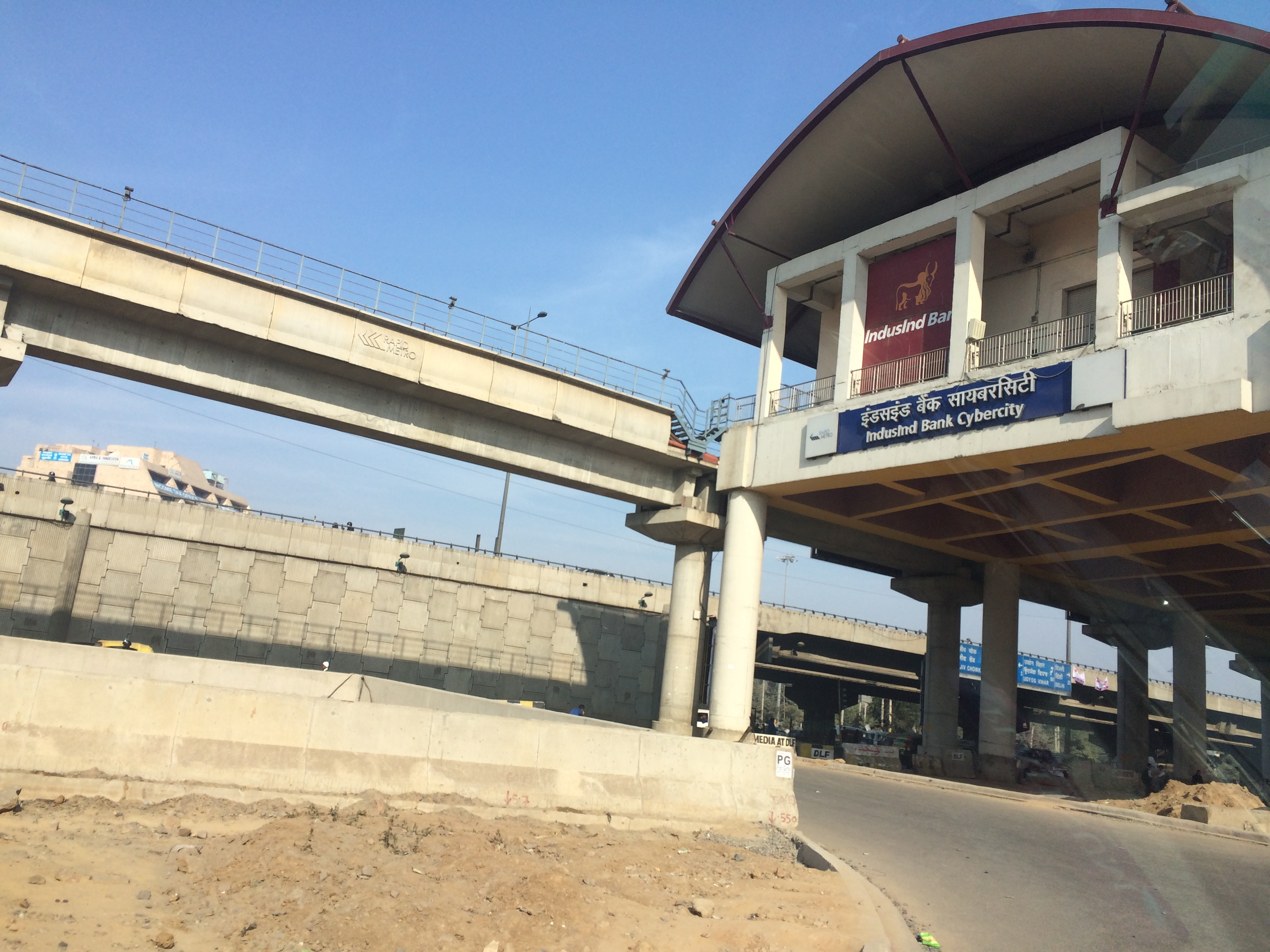

General information
- Coordinates: 28.497963°N 77.089168°E
- Owner: Haryana Mass Rapid Transport Corporation Limited (HMRTC)
- Operator: Delhi Metro Rail Corporation (DMRC)
- Platforms: Platform-1 → Phase 3
- Tracks: 1

Construction
- Structure type: Elevated
- Platform levels: 2
- Accessible: Yes

Other information
- Station code: GAT

History
- Opened: 7 May 2014; 12 years ago
- Electrified: 750 V, DC via third rail

Services
Preceding station	Rapid Metro Gurgaon	Following station
Belvedere Towers One-way operation	Line 1	Moulsari Avenue towards Phase 3
Route map
Location
- Location within Delhi Location within Haryana

Cyber City is a station of the Rapid Metro Gurgaon that was inaugurated on 7 May 2014. It is owned by Haryana Mass Rapid Transport Corporation Limited (HMRTC) and operated by Delhi Metro Rail Corporation (DMRC). Previously, it was operated by Rapid Metro Gurgaon Limited (RMGL).

The station was named after IndusInd Bank under corporate branding of stations, but the naming rights expired in 2019.

== The station ==
=== Facilities ===
The station has the following facilities:

- ITC Kiosk: 3 kiosks - two on ground level and one in unpaid concourse
- ATM: IndusInd bank ATM in unpaid concourse
- Shop/Office: Royal Mobile, selling mobile accessories in unpaid concourse

== Entry/exits ==
Cyber City station Entry/exits
Gate No-1	Gate No-2
Cyber Hub Road	Towards Gateway Towers

== Nearby places ==
- Cyber City Gurgaon
- Shankar Chowk
- Ericsson Building, Gurugram
- Udyog Vihar
- DLF Gateway Towers, Gurugram
- Infinity Towers, Gurugram
- Trident Hotel, Gurugram
