= Belvedere Towers metro station =

Rapid Metro Gurgaon station

Belvedere Towers

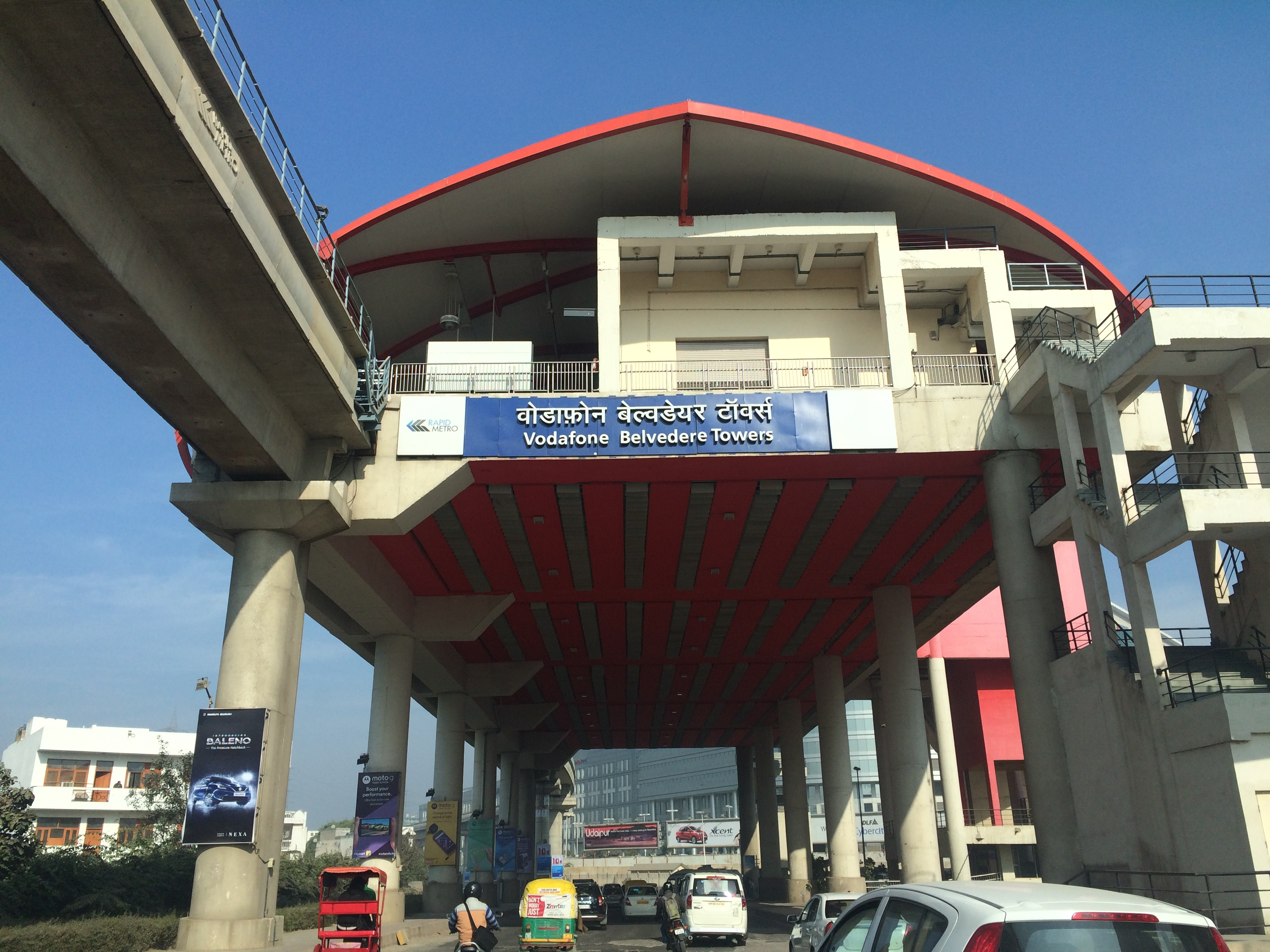

General information
- Coordinates: 28.491664°N 77.088139°E
- Owner: Haryana Mass Rapid Transport Corporation Limited
- Operator: Delhi Metro Rail Corporation
- Platforms: Platform-1 → Phase 3
- Tracks: 2

Construction
- Structure type: Elevated
- Platform levels: 2
- Accessible: Yes

Other information
- Station code: BEL

History
- Opened: 14 November 2013; 12 years ago
- Electrified: 750 V, DC via third rail

Services
| Preceding station | Rapid Metro Gurgaon | Following station |
|---|---|---|
| Phase 2 One-way operation | Line 1 | Cyber City towards Phase 3 via Moulsari Avenue |
Route map
Location
- Location within Delhi Location within Haryana

Belvedere Towers is a station of Rapid Metro Gurgaon opened in November 2013. It is owned by Haryana Mass Rapid Transport Corporation Limited and operated by Delhi Metro Rail Corporation. Earlier it was operated by Rapid Metro Gurgaon Limited. It is located in the Gurgaon Region.

The station was named after mobile service provider Vodafone under corporate branding of stations. The naming rights 'Vodafone' was removed in early 2019 and now it is called Belvedere Towers metro station.
