= Sector 42-43 metro station =

Metro station in Haryana, India

Gurugram Sector 42-43

General information
- Coordinates: 28.457392°N 77.096895°E
- Owner: Haryana Mass Rapid Transport Corporation Limited (HMRTC)
- Operator: Delhi Metro Rail Corporation (DMRC)
- Platforms: Platform-1 → Sector 55–56; Platform-2 → Phase 3
- Tracks: 2

Construction
- Structure type: Elevated
- Platform levels: 2
- Accessible: Yes

Other information
- Station code: SUL

History
- Opened: 25 April 2017; 9 years ago
- Electrified: 750 V, DC via third rail

Services
Preceding station	Rapid Metro Gurgaon	Following station
Sector 53-54 towards Sector 55–56	Line 1	Phase 1 towards Phase 3 via Moulsari Avenue
Route map
Location
- Location within Delhi Location within Haryana

Gurugram Sector 42-43 is a station of the Rapid Metro Gurgaon in Haryana, India. The station was opened to the public on 25 April 2017. It is owned by Haryana Mass Rapid Transport Corporation Limited (HMRTC) and operated by Delhi Metro Rail Corporation (DMRC). Earlier it was operated by Rapid Metro Gurgaon Limited (RMGL).

== Nearby ==
State Bank of India, ICICI Bank ATM.
