= Sector 54 Chowk metro station =

Metro station in Haryana, India

Gurugram Sector 54 Chowk

General information
- Coordinates: 28.432921°N 77.104921°E
- Owner: Haryana Mass Rapid Transport Corporation Limited (HMRTC)
- Operator: Delhi Metro Rail Corporation (DMRC)
- Platforms: Platform-1 → Sector 55–56; Platform-2 → Phase 3
- Tracks: 2

Construction
- Structure type: Elevated
- Platform levels: 2
- Accessible: Yes

Other information
- Station code: AIT

History
- Opened: 31 March 2017; 9 years ago
- Electrified: 750 V, DC via third rail

Services
Preceding station	Rapid Metro Gurgaon	Following station
Sector 55–56 Terminus	Line 1	Sector 53-54 towards Phase 3 via Moulsari Avenue
Route map
Location
- Location within Delhi Location within Haryana

Gurugram Sector 54 Chowk is a station of the Rapid Metro Gurgaon in Haryana, India. The station was opened to the public on 31 March 2017. It is owned by Haryana Mass Rapid Transport Corporation Limited (HMRTC) and operated by Delhi Metro Rail Corporation (DMRC). Earlier it was operated by Rapid Metro Gurgaon Limited (RMGL).
