= Sikanderpur metro station =

Metro station in Delhi, India

Sikanderpur

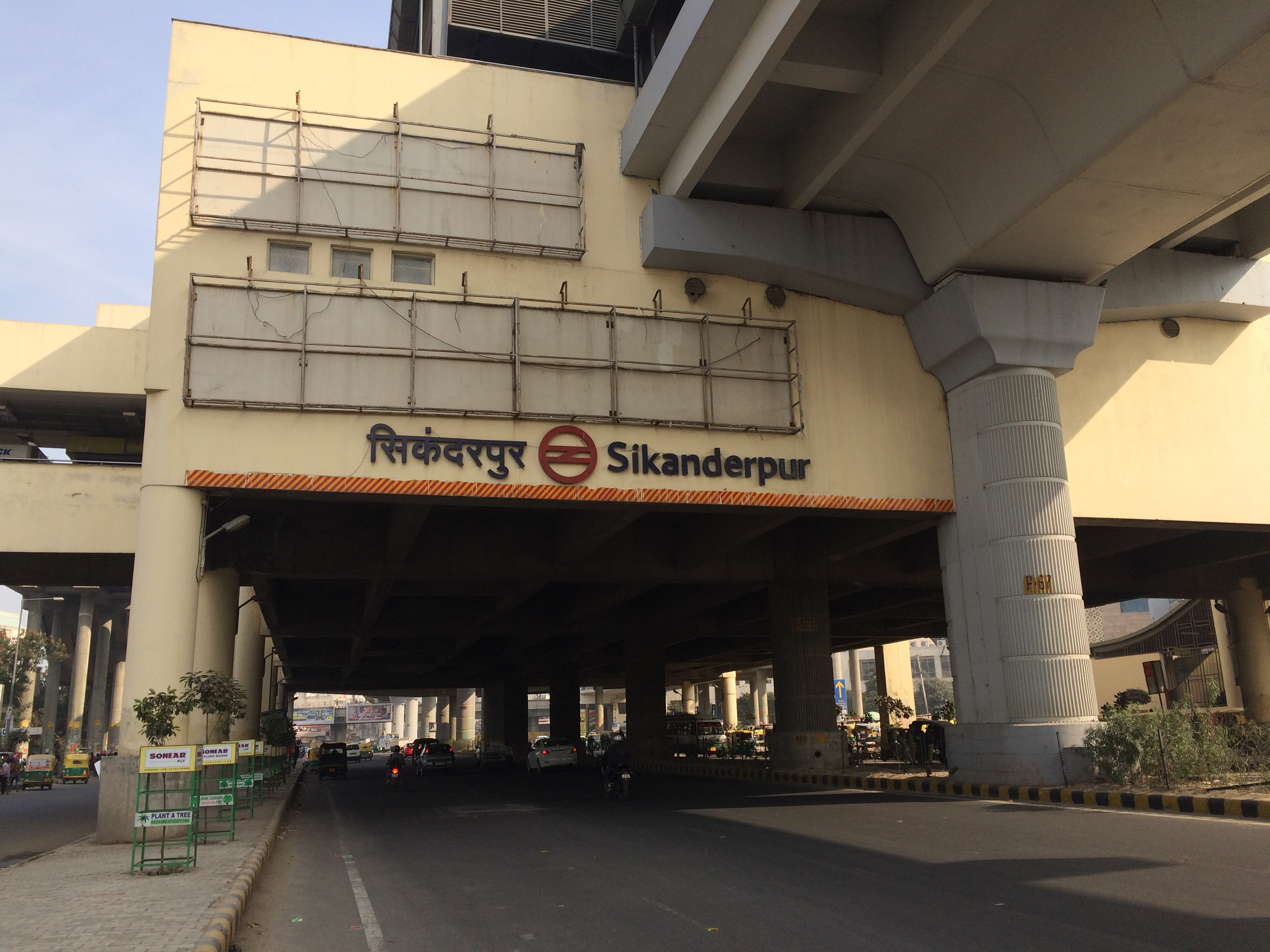

General information
- Location: Gurugram, Haryana; India
- Coordinates: 28°28′53″N 77°05′35″E
- System: Delhi Metro station Rapid Metro station
- Owner: Delhi Metro
- Line: Yellow Line Rapid Metro
- Platforms: Side platform (Delhi Metro); Platform-1 → Millennium City Centre Gurugram; Platform-2 → Samaypur Badli; Side platform (Rapid Metro); Platform-1 → Sector 55–56; Platform-2 → Phase 3
- Tracks: 4

Construction
- Structure type: Elevated
- Parking: Available
- Cycle facilities: Yes
- Accessible: Yes

Other information
- Station code: SKRP

History
- Opened: 21 June 2010; 16 years ago (Delhi Metro); 14 November 2013; 13 years ago (Rapid Metro)
- Electrified: 25 kV 50 Hz AC through overhead catenary (Delhi Metro); 750 V DC through Third rail (Rapid Metro)

Services
Preceding station	Delhi Metro	Following station
Guru Dronacharya towards Samaypur Badli	Yellow Line	MG Road towards Millennium City Centre Gurugram
Preceding station	Rapid Metro Gurgaon	Following station
Phase 1 towards Sector 55–56	Line 1	Phase 2 towards Phase 3 via Moulsari Avenue
Route map
Location

Sikanderpur is a metro station on the Yellow Line of the Delhi Metro and has served as an interchange station with the Rapid Metro since 14 November 2013. According to a 2019 report, the station handled approximately 45,000 daily passengers on the Yellow Line, while around 2,000 passengers used the Rapid Metro interchange each day. The station provides connectivity to several corporate offices and commercial developments in the vicinity.

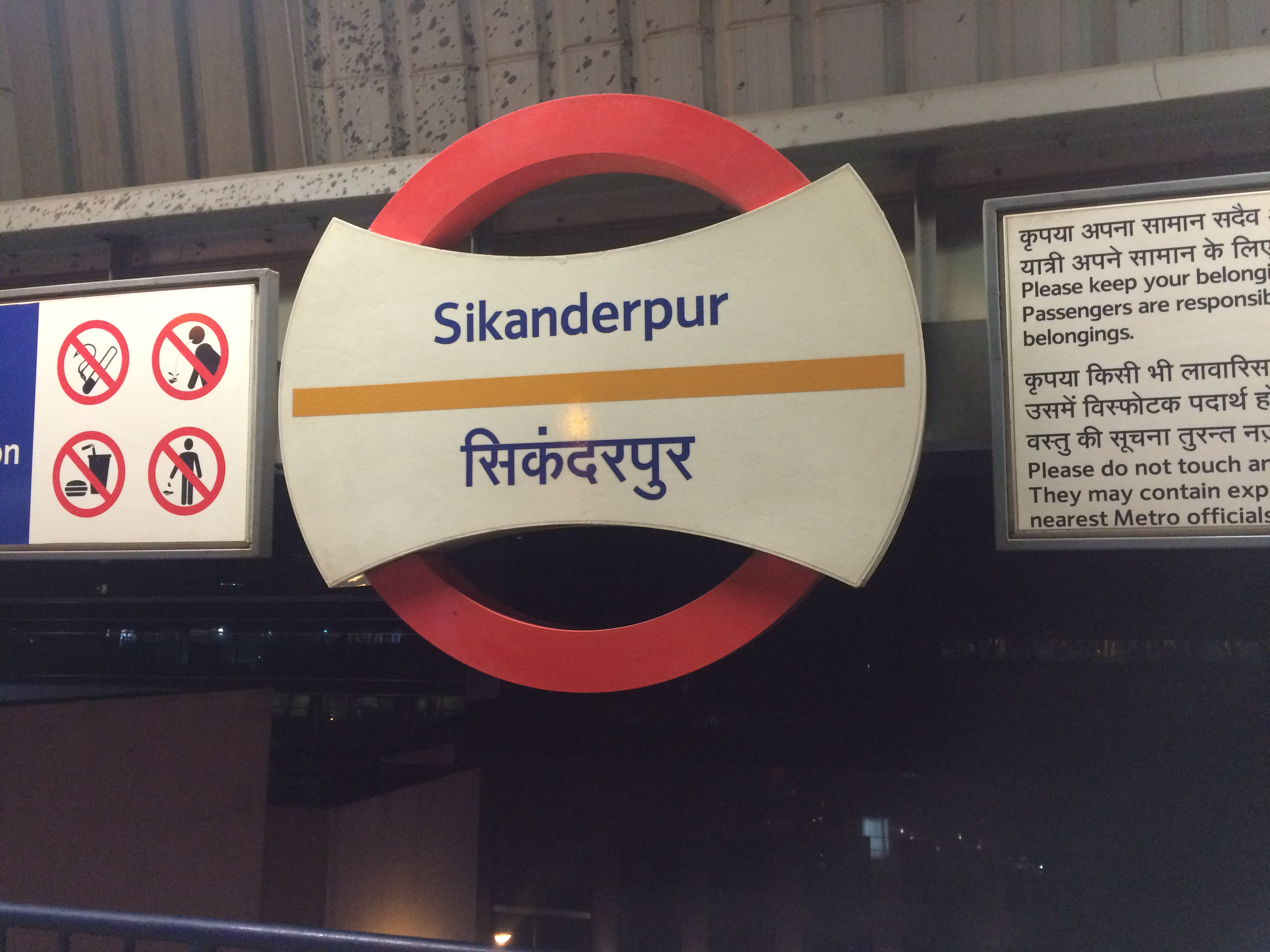
Sikanderpur metro station

== History ==
Sikanderpur metro station opened on 21 June 2010 as part of the Qutub Minar–HUDA City Centre (now known as Millennium City Centre Gurugram) of the Delhi Metro's Yellow Line. In July 2009, the Haryana government awarded a project to develop a metro link between Sikanderpur and National Highway 8 (NH-8) to Rapid MetroRail Gurgaon Limited (RMGL), under a public-private partnership (PPP). In December 2011, plans were announced to establish an interchange between the two metro systems at Sikanderpur. As the Rapid Metro used standard gauge while the Delhi Metro's Yellow Line used broad gauge, a skybridge was planned to connect the two stations. Rapid Metro commenced commercial operations on 14 November 2013, making Sikanderpur an interchange station. On 23 October 2019, the Delhi Metro Rail Corporation (DMRC) took over the operation and maintenance of the Rapid Metro network.

== See also ==
- List of Delhi Metro stations
- Transport in Delhi
