= Phase 2 metro station =

Rapid Metro Gurgaon station

DLF Phase 2

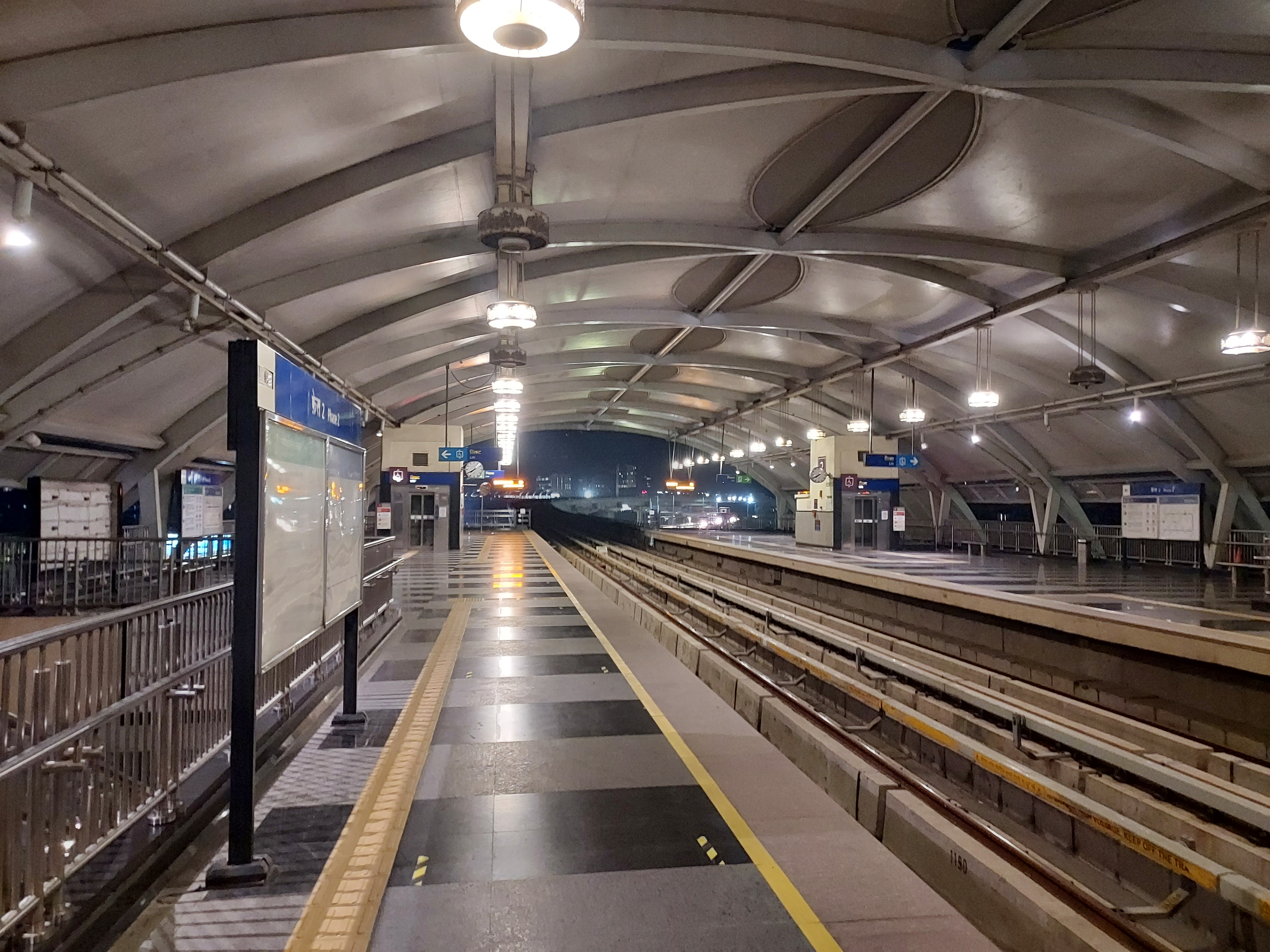
- Platform 1 on Phase 2 Metro station

General information
- Location: Phase 2, Gurugram, Haryana
- Coordinates: 28.487534°N 77.092947°E
- Owner: Haryana Mass Rapid Transport Corporation Limited (HMRTC)
- Operator: Delhi Metro Rail Corporation (DMRC)
- Platforms: Platform-1 → Sector 55–56; Platform-2 → Phase 3
- Tracks: 2

Construction
- Structure type: Elevated
- Platform levels: 2
- Accessible: Yes

Other information
- Station code: DL2

History
- Opened: 14 November 2013; 12 years ago
- Electrified: 750 V, DC via third rail

Services
Preceding station	Rapid Metro Gurgaon	Following station
Sikanderpur towards Sector 55–56	Line 1	Belvedere Towers towards Phase 3 via Moulsari Avenue
Sikanderpur towards Sector 55–56	Line 1	Phase 3 One-way operation
Route map
Location
- Location within Delhi Location within Haryana

DLF Phase 2 is a station of the Rapid Metro Gurgaon in Haryana, India which is owned by Haryana Mass Rapid Transport Corporation Limited (HMRTC) and operated by Delhi Metro Rail Corporation (DMRC). Earlier it was operated by Rapid Metro Gurgaon Limited (RMGL).

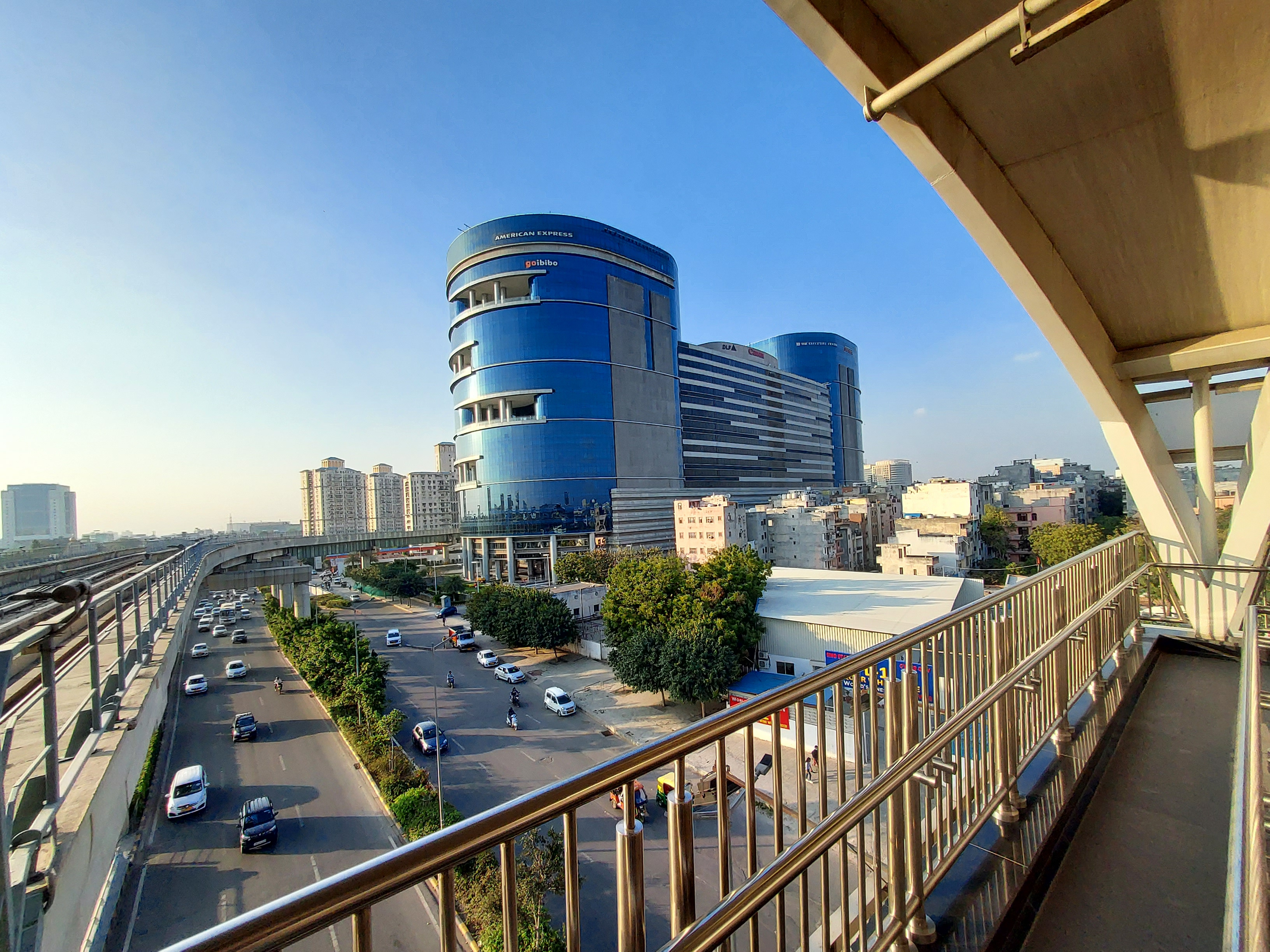
DLF Epitome Tower as seen from Phase 2 metro station
