= Guru Dronacharya metro station =

Metro station in Delhi, India

Guru Dronacharya

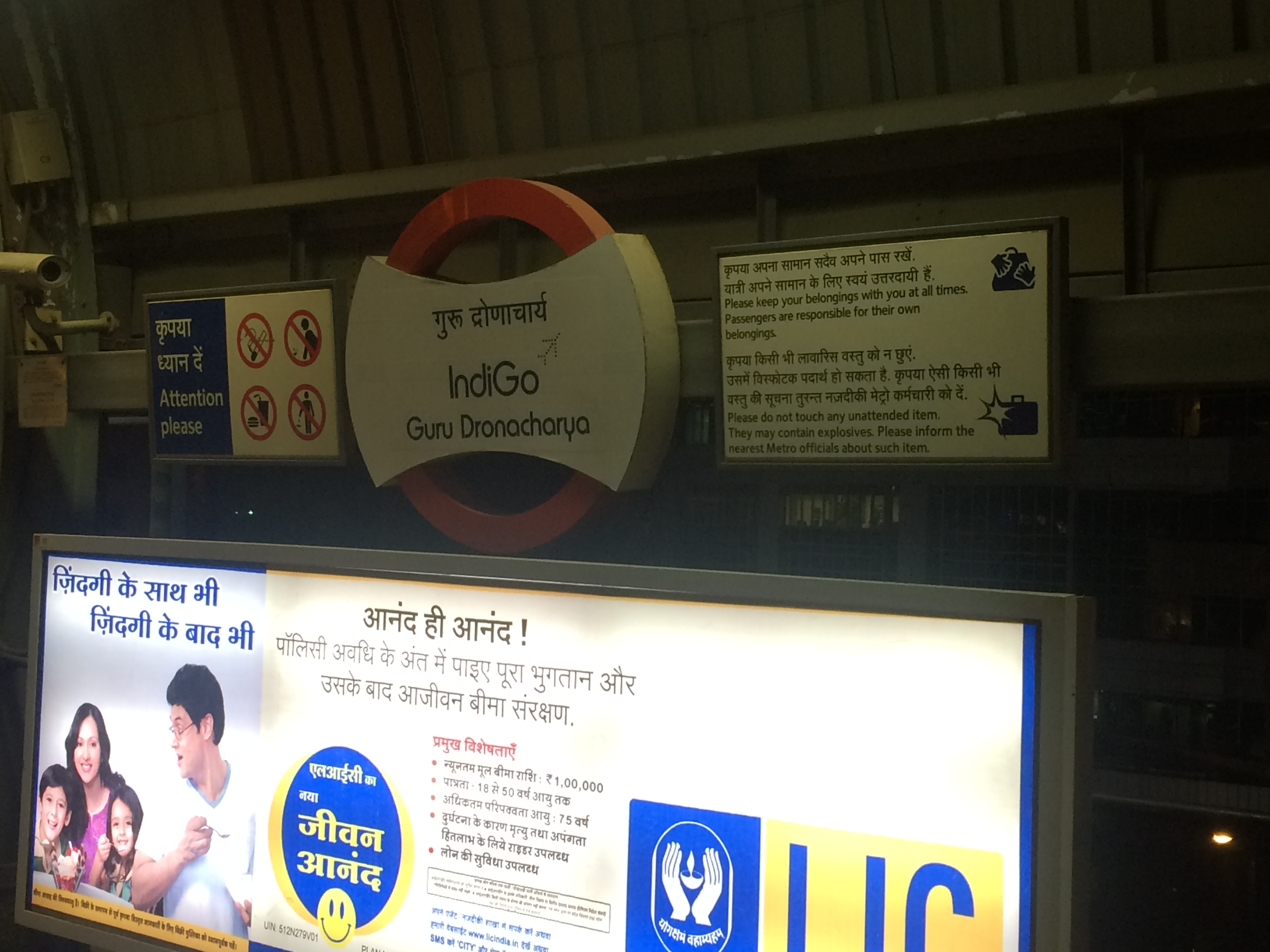

General information
- Location: NH236, Garden Estate, DLF Phase 3, Sector 26, Gurugram, Haryana 122002; India
- Coordinates: 28°28′55″N 77°06′09″E
- System: Delhi Metro station
- Owner: Delhi Metro
- Operator: Delhi Metro Rail Corporation (DMRC)
- Line: Yellow Line
- Platforms: Side platform; Platform-1 → Millennium City Centre Gurugram; Platform-2 → Samaypur Badli
- Tracks: 2

Construction
- Structure type: Elevated, Double-track
- Platform levels: 2
- Parking: Available
- Accessible: Yes

Other information
- Status: Staffed, Operational
- Station code: GE

History
- Opened: 21 June 2010; 16 years ago
- Electrified: 25 kV 50 Hz AC through overhead catenary

Passengers
- Jan 2015: 9,116/day 282,587/ Month average

Services
Preceding station	Delhi Metro	Following station
Arjan Garh towards Samaypur Badli	Yellow Line	Sikanderpur towards Millennium City Centre Gurugram
Route map
Location

The Guru Dronacharya metro station is located on the Yellow Line of the Delhi Metro. It is the First Metro Station in Gurugram, in the state of Haryana.

== History ==
The station is named after Drona, a master of advanced military arts and guru in the Mahabharata. In November 2015, the station was rebranded after budget airline IndiGo.

=== Station layout ===
L2	Side platform | Doors will open on the left
L2	Platform 1 Southbound	Towards → Millennium City Centre Gurugram; Next Station: Sikanderpur Change at the next station for Rapid Metro Gurgaon
L2	Platform 2 Northbound	Towards ← Samaypur Badli; Next Station: Arjan Garh
L2	Side platform | Doors will open on the left
L1	Concourse	Fare control, station agent, Metro Card vending machines, crossover
G	Street Level	Exit/Entrance

=== Facilities ===
List of available ATM at Guru Dronacharya metro station are

== Entry/exit ==
Guru Dronacharya metro station Entry/exits
Gate No-1	Gate No-2

== Connections ==
=== Bus ===
Delhi Transport Corporation bus routes number Badarpur Border - Gurugram Bus Stand, Cyber City - Ballabhgarh, Cyber City - Sector 37 Faridabad, Gurugram Bus Stand - Badarpur Road, Sohna Road - Malviya Nagar Metro, Udyog Vihar - Neharpar serves the station from outside metro station stop. New bus transport service "Gurugaman" Route No 112 has also been availed by the Chief Minister of Haryana, Manohar Lal Khattar from Haryana Vidyut Prasaran Nigam Sector 55-56 to Krishna Chowk Palam Vihar which also includes Sikanderpur as a bus stop that is only 200 mts away from Guru Dronacharya metro station and for reaching to the bus stop exit from Gate No 1.

== See also ==
- Haryana
- Gurgaon
- List of Delhi Metro stations
- Transport in Delhi
- Delhi Metro Rail Corporation
- Delhi Suburban Railway
- Delhi Monorail
- Delhi Transport Corporation
- South East Delhi
- New Delhi
- National Capital Region (India)
- List of rapid transit systems
- List of metro systems
