= The Office Pass =

Co-working tech platform

The Office Pass (TOP)
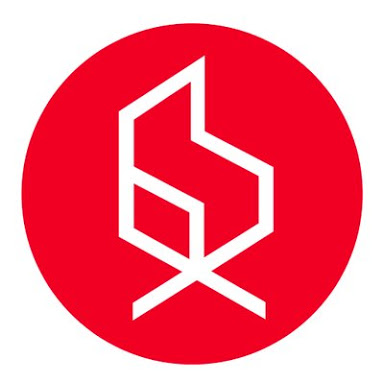
- Company type: Private
- Founded: March 2017; 9 years ago
- Founders: Aditya Verma; Nikhil Madan; Sachin Gaur; Saket Bijpuria
- Headquarters: Gurgaon, India
- Number of locations: 25 (2022)
- Areas served: India
- Key people: Aditya Verma (Co-founder); Nikhil Madan (Co-founder); Sachin Gaur (Co-founder); Saket Bijpuria (Co-founder)
- Services: Shared workspaces services
- Website: www.theofficepass.com

The Office Pass (TOP) is a neighborhood co-working tech platform and operator, headquartered in Gurgaon, India, that connects companies and professionals with office space located near them.

== History ==
The Office Pass (TOP) was founded in March 2017 by Aditya Verma, Nikhil Madan, and Sachin Gaur. The company was started by Aditya Verma who was a co-founder and former CEO of Makaan.com, a property portal which was acquired by PropTiger in 2015 and then Verma left the company in December 2016.

In August 2021, The Office Pass operated in 9 Neighborhood Coworking offices across Delhi NCR.

== Locations ==
The Office Pass (TOP) has 7 offices in Gurgaon location. They have biggest office in Noida sector 4. Recently they have opened their new office in Golf Course Road, Near Sector 53-54 metro station, Gurgaon.

=== Gurgaon ===
- Cyber City, DLF Phase 3, Gurgaon
- Unitech Cyber Park, Sec 39
- JMD Megapolis, Sohna Road
- Vipul Trade Centre, Sohna Road
- DLF Corporate Greens - New Gurgaon
- Paras Downtown, Golf Course Road
- Vatika Towers, Golf Course Road

=== Noida ===
- Sector - 4, Near Noida Sector 16 metro station

=== Delhi ===
- Mohan Cooperative, Near Mohan Estate metro station, South Delhi

== Funding ==
In April 2017, The Office Pass has received a funding of $245,000 (Rs 1.5 crore) in seed investment by Arun Tadanki, former managing director of Yahoo India and Southeast Asia and from other groups of investors.

In November 2017, The Office Pass has raised an undisclosed funding by Dhruv Agarwala, the chief executive and founder of PropTiger, Housing.com and other individual investors have also participated in the round.

== Recognition ==
- 2018: Recognized as the top 100 start-ups by Sutra HR.

== See also ==
- Regus
- WeWork
