= Oozo.tv =

Brazilian technology company

Oozo.tv is a Brazilian technology company headquartered in São Paulo, Brazil. Oozo.tv gathers content from a variety of sources such as social media, print media, videos, pictures and other formats and displays it as a personal channel. This serves as a communication tool for businesses or individuals to express themselves and interact with their audience. The company has a differential system that uses QR codes that are applied in various ways according to the requirements of each market. In addition, the company uses a web-based digital signage system used by Brazilians in many parts of the world.

== History ==
Oozo.tv was developed in Brazil in 2013 (13 years ago), and was tested for the first time in Berlin in partnership with Betahaus. In 2015, Oozo.tv expanded and is now accessible in multiple countries, including Brazil, Chile, the United States and Germany.

== Recognition ==
Oozo.tv received awards in competitions around the world. In 2014, the Brazilian government awarded the company the Exportador de Idéias.
