= Betahaus =

Coordinates: 52.50261°N 13.41222°E

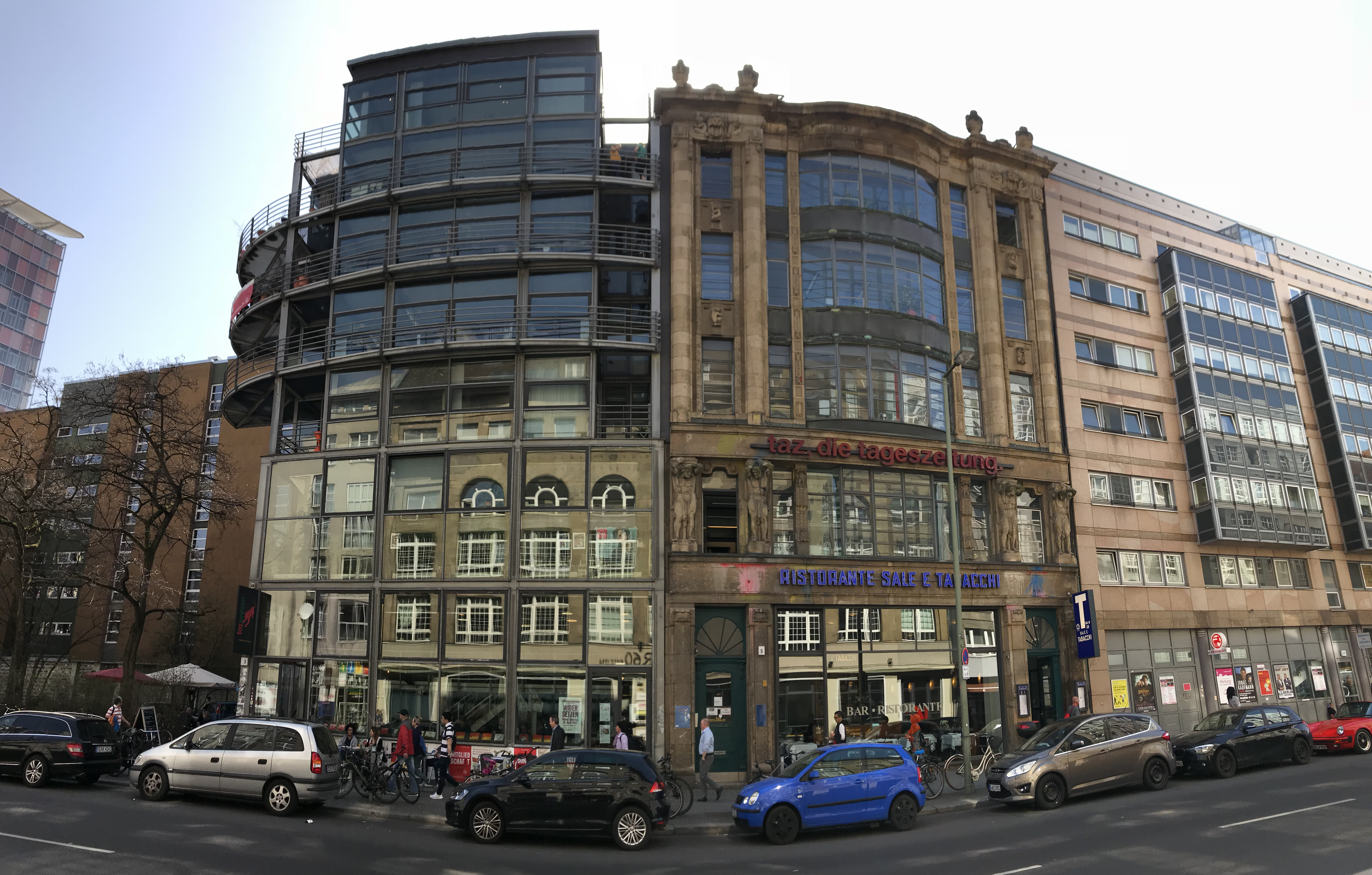
betahaus Kreuzberg, Head Quarter location in Berlin

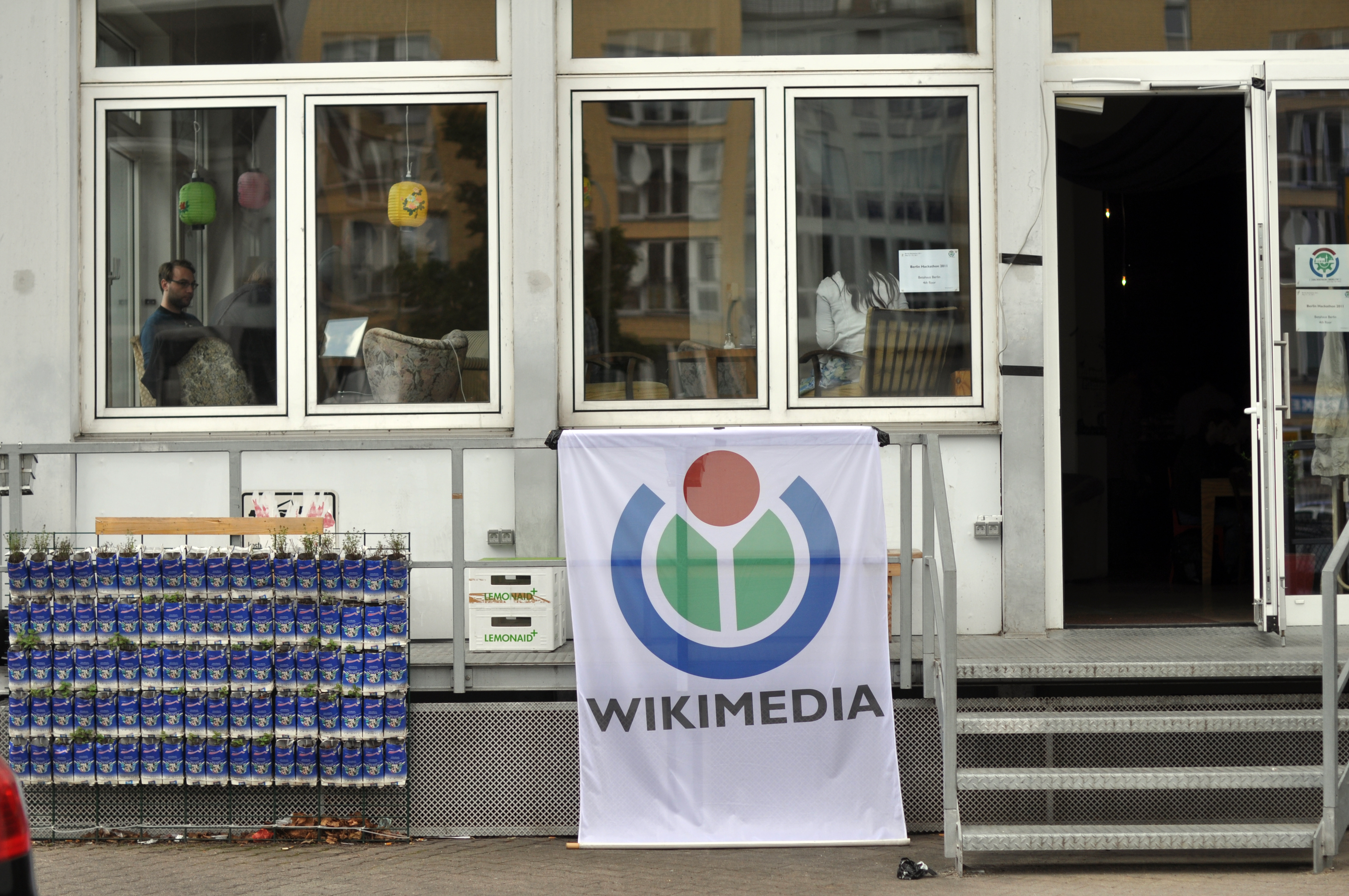
Entry to betahaus Berlin with Hackathon

betahaus is a coworking space in Berlin and was started in January 2009 by the six founders Tonia Welter, Gregor Scheppan, Stephan Bielefeldt, Madeleine von Mohl, Max von der Ahé and Christoph Fahle, the official opening in Berlin took place in April 2009. Thus, betahaus was a pioneer and the first under similar facilities in Berlin.

== Locations ==
betahaus has locations in Sofia, Hamburg, Barcelona and Bucharest. Well-known start-ups that started here are, for example, Coffee Circle, Ezeep, GoEuro (Omio), car2go and Clue.

At the end of 2018, betahaus moved from Prinzessinenstrasse in Berlin's Kreuzberg district to the old taz building in Rudi-Dutschke-Strasse in Berlin.

== Bankruptcy ==
The locations in Hamburg and Cologne had to file for bankruptcy. While the Cologne location was closed, the Hamburg location could be saved.

betahaus again filed for insolvency in 2021, a proposal that was approved by the court in Germany in December, 2021. This allows betahaus to remain open even with debts to creditors and investors that will never be repaid.

== Business Model ==
The company generates 40 percent of its turnover through the workspaces it offers. 40 percent are taken with events and conferences and 20 percent with a public Café. An example of an event is the "Female-Founders-Breakfast", to which former minister for economy affairs Brigitte Zypries invited in 2014. In 2009, the Yes Men presented their film The Yes Men Fix the World standing in a shopping cart in betahaus as part of Berlinale.

== See also ==
- The Office Pass
- The Network Hub
