= Udyog Vihar =

Udyog Vihar, Gurgaon
- Industrial Estate
- Location in Gurgaon, India Udyog Vihar, Gurgaon (India)
- Coordinates: 28.30°N 77.5°E
- Country: India
- State: Haryana

Government
  - Type: A Government of Haryana Undertaking
  - Body: Haryana State Industrial & Infrastructure Development Corporation Limited

Languages
  - Official: English, Hindi
- Time zone: UTC+5:30 (IST)
- PIN: 122016
- Telephone code: 0124
- Website: www.hsiidc.org

Udyog Vihar is an industrial estate in Gurgaon, Haryana, having more than 1200 industrial and commercial units.

== Background ==
Udyog Vihar is located near Delhi-Gurgaon Border and eight kilometres (5.0 mi) from Indira Gandhi International Airport on National Highway 8. The estate is 728 acres (295 ha) including all phases.

== Connectivity ==
Roads: Udyog Vihar is well designed, and having well connected roads. Companies using charted buses and cabs for their employee, which is near Delhi–Gurgaon Expressway, NH 8.

Rapid metro: Rapid Metro Gurgaon is another transport option available. The nearest Rapid Metro Station is DLF Phase III.

Rapid Metro Station DLF Phase III is connected to the Sikanderpur metro station. From here it is connected to different parts of Gurgaon and Delhi.

== Detail of phases ==
Udyog Vihar is further divided into five phases.

- Udyog Vihar Phase I
- Udyog Vihar Phase II
- Udyog Vihar Phase III
- Udyog Vihar Phase IV
- Udyog Vihar Phase V
