= Ghitorni =

- Urban
- Location in India
- Coordinates: 28.60955°N 77.13967°E
- Country: India
- State: Delhi
- District: South West

Population (2011)
  - Total: 14,893

Languages
  - Official: Hindi, English, Gujari
- Time zone: UTC+5:30 (IST)
- Postal code: 110030
- Vehicle registration: DL 12

Ghitorni is a village in the South West district in the state of Delhi, India. It is located in southern Delhi, near the Gurgaon border and Vasant Kunj. In the 2011 census the population was 14,893, mainly Lohmod (Lohia) Gujjars, and this village is also known as biggest Lohmod (Lohia) Gujjar Village in South Delhi.

Ghitorni lies on the Mehrauli–Gurgaon Road. Ghitorni village is well connected by metro; it is the third metro station from Qutub Minar metro station towards Gurugram on the Yellow Line, and the station is named Ghitorini metro station. The metro station has two main entry/exit gates on either side of MG Road, both equipped with lifts. Ghitorni is served by DTC bus routes 517, 525, and BG which run along the Mehrauli–Gurgaon Road.
