= Cyber City Gurgaon =

- Commercial area
- DLF Cyber City
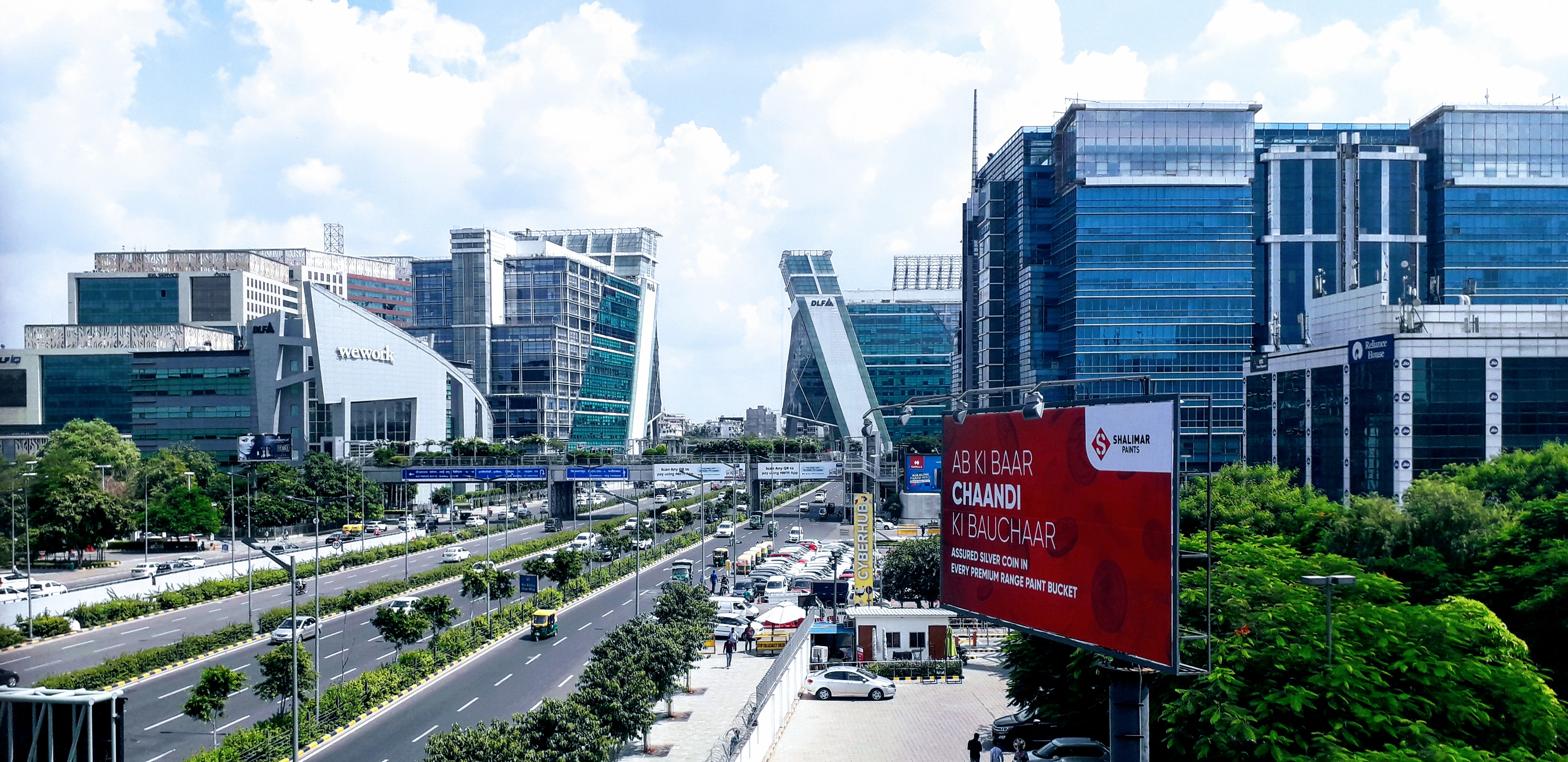
- View of the Cyber City
- Interactive map of Cyber City Gurgaon
- Coordinates: 28°29′40″N 77°05′26″E
- Country: India
- State: Haryana
- Established: 2003; 23 years ago

DLF Cyber City is a commercial area in Gurugram, Haryana, India, established in 2003. The area is home to several top IT and Fortune 500 company offices. The area is considered one of the largest hubs of IT activity in Delhi NCR. Cyber City lies near Udyog Vihar, a conventional industrial area on the opposite side of NH-48.

Cyber Hub is a large shopping and dining area with several restaurants and shops, catering primarily to the working in DLF Cyber City.

== Transport ==
In 2013, Rapid Metro was introduced in Cyber City, connecting it to the Delhi Metro. The operational stations are within Cyber City. The National Highway 48 (NH-48) runs through Cyber City, and a project to construct a 16-lane expressway is also in progress. A flyover between Cyber City and MG Road was opened in 2015 to reduce traffic congestion. The Indira Gandhi International Airport is located close to the city. Delhi Metro Phase 4 includes an extension of the Yellow Line beyond HUDA City Centre (Millennium City Centre), improving direct access from central Delhi, including Rajiv Chowk.

== Infrastructure ==
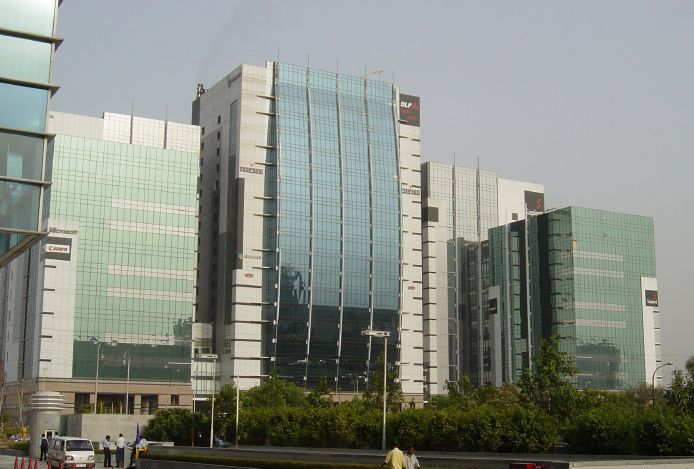
Cyber Green Building in June 2007

The Gateway Tower is a high-rise building at the entrance of the Cyber City that houses the headquarters of DLF.

Cyber Greens, a LEED Platinum Certified building, is spread across an area of 85,000 square metres (910,000 sq ft). The complex comprises five blocks, each ranging from 11 to 19 storeys. Located just off National Highway-48 at the entrance to Gurugram, it is well connected to domestic and international airports, the rapid metro, the 16-lane Raghavendra Marg, and walkways.

Cyber Hub is a massive courtyard within Cyber City and is considered a hub of food and beverages in Gurugram. The DLF Cyber Hub, opened in 2013, spans about 37,000 m^{2} (400,000 sq ft) and houses various clothing brands such as Decathlon, Marks & Spencer, Nike, Skechers, The Body Shop, Chumbak, and Uniqlo, as well as a large bookshop called The Crossword. The Cyber Hub Complex also includes a KIA Motors dealership. It contains food outlets such as Domino's, The Big Chill, Nando's, Haldiram's, Yeti, Farzi Cafe, The Wine Co, Yum Yum Cha, Tablespoon, etc. as well as a stand-up comedy venue, The People & Co., and a Broadway-style theatre. There is an open-air amphitheatre that hosts weekend cultural & art shows and rock concerts.

== Gallery ==
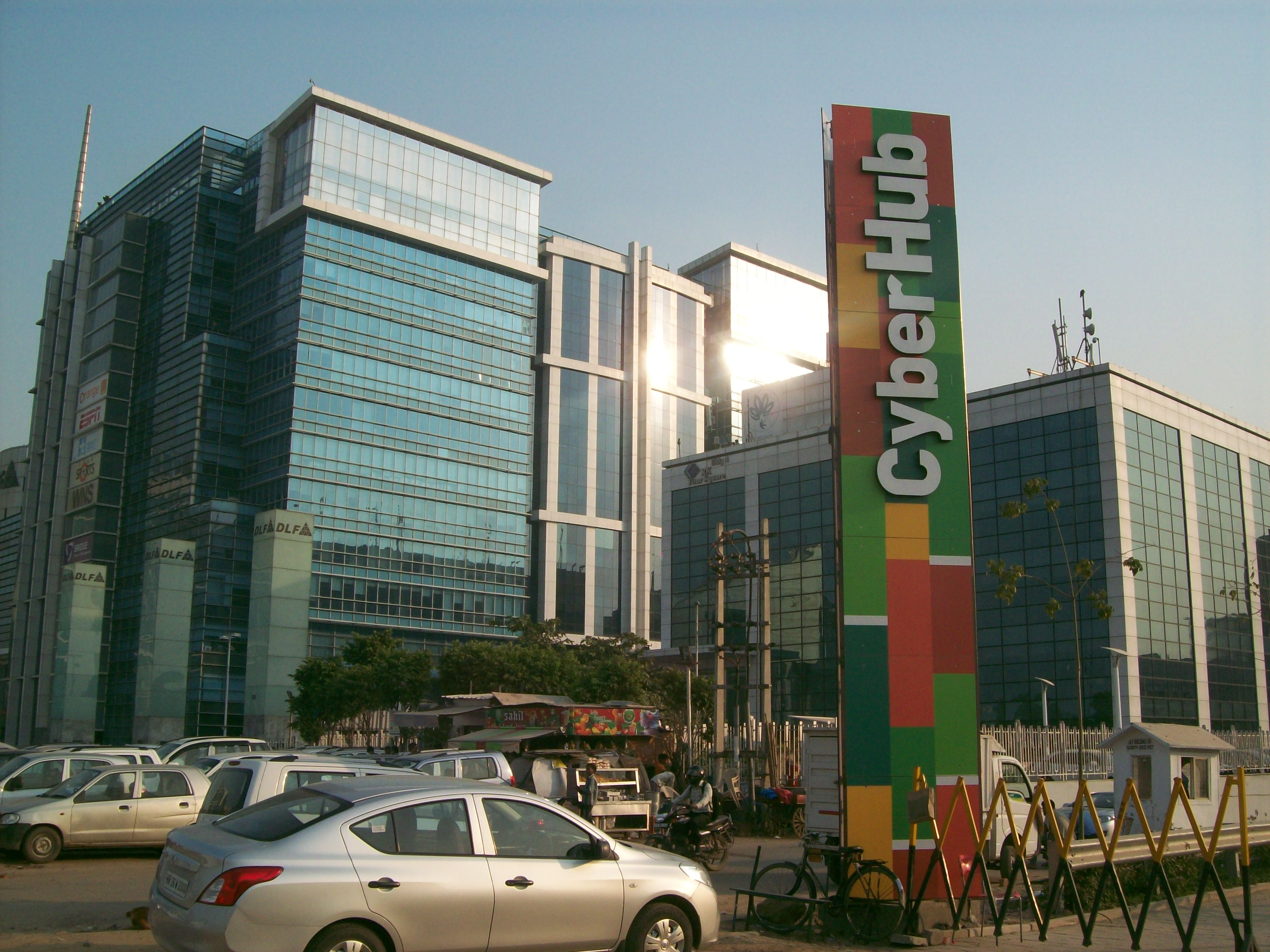
A commercial area in DLF Cyber City

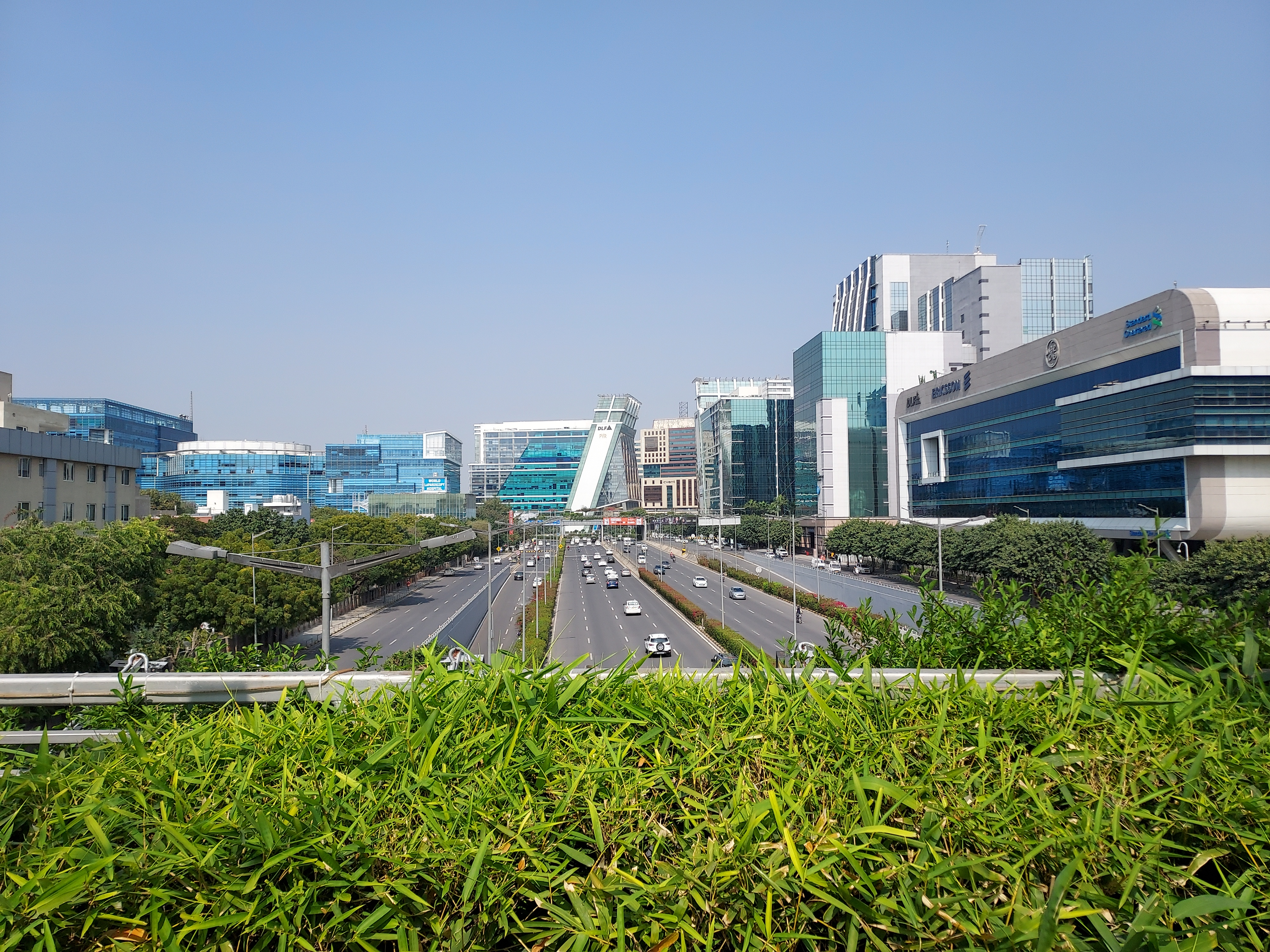
A view of Cyber City from a walkway above the highway

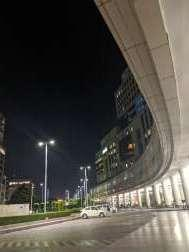
Cyber City at night

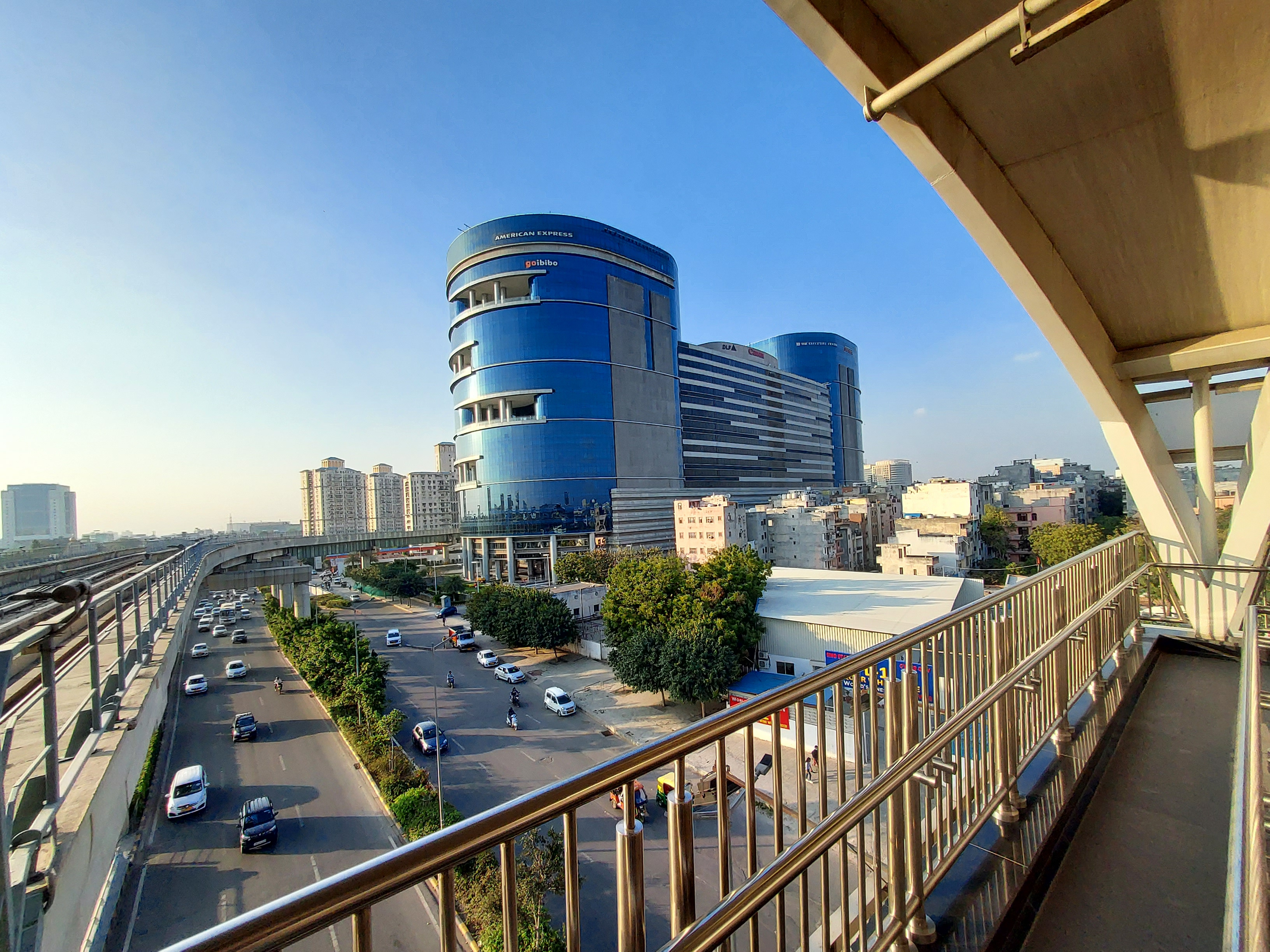
DLF Epitome Tower, Gurugram

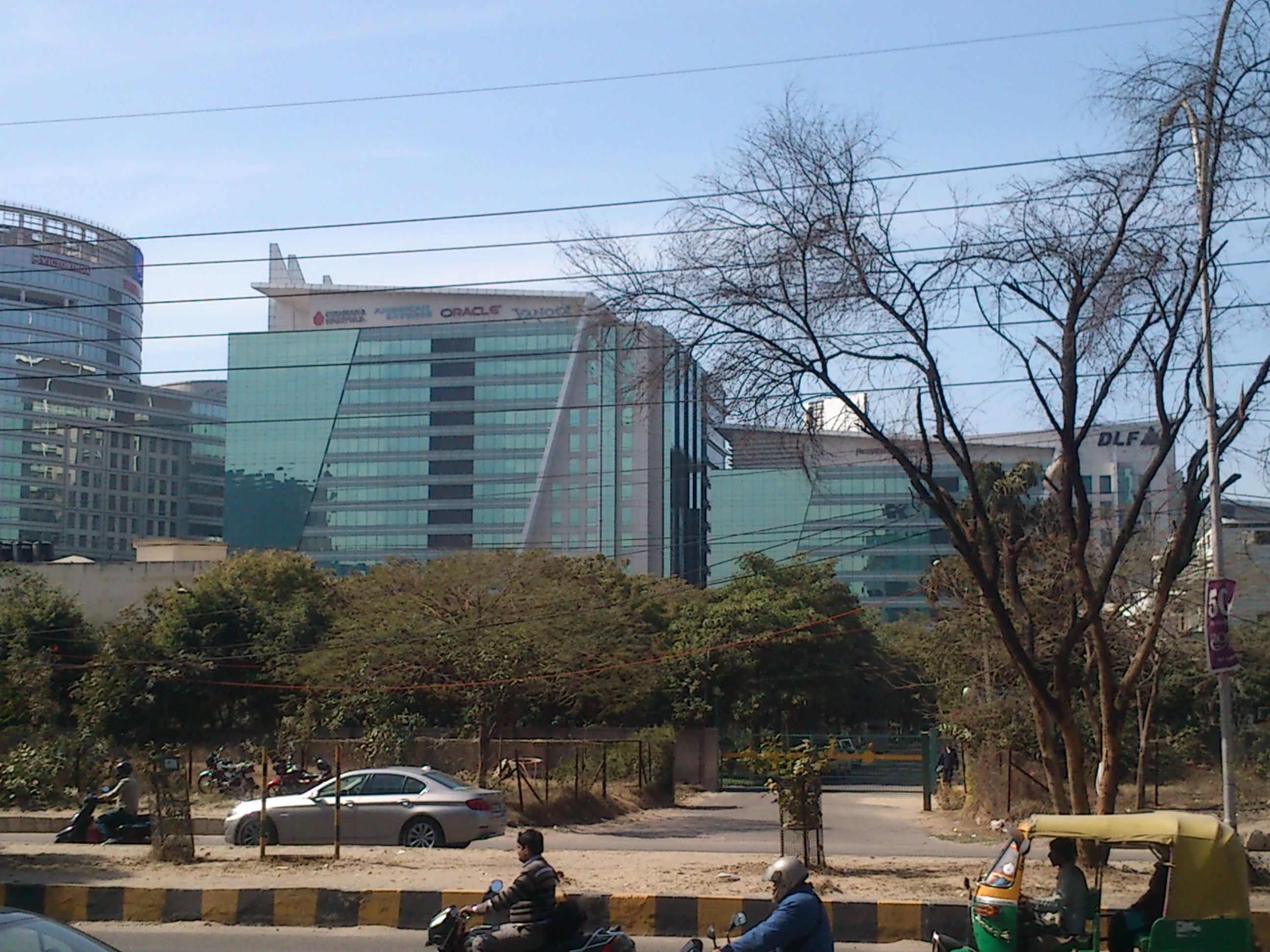
DLF Cyber City, DLF Phase 2

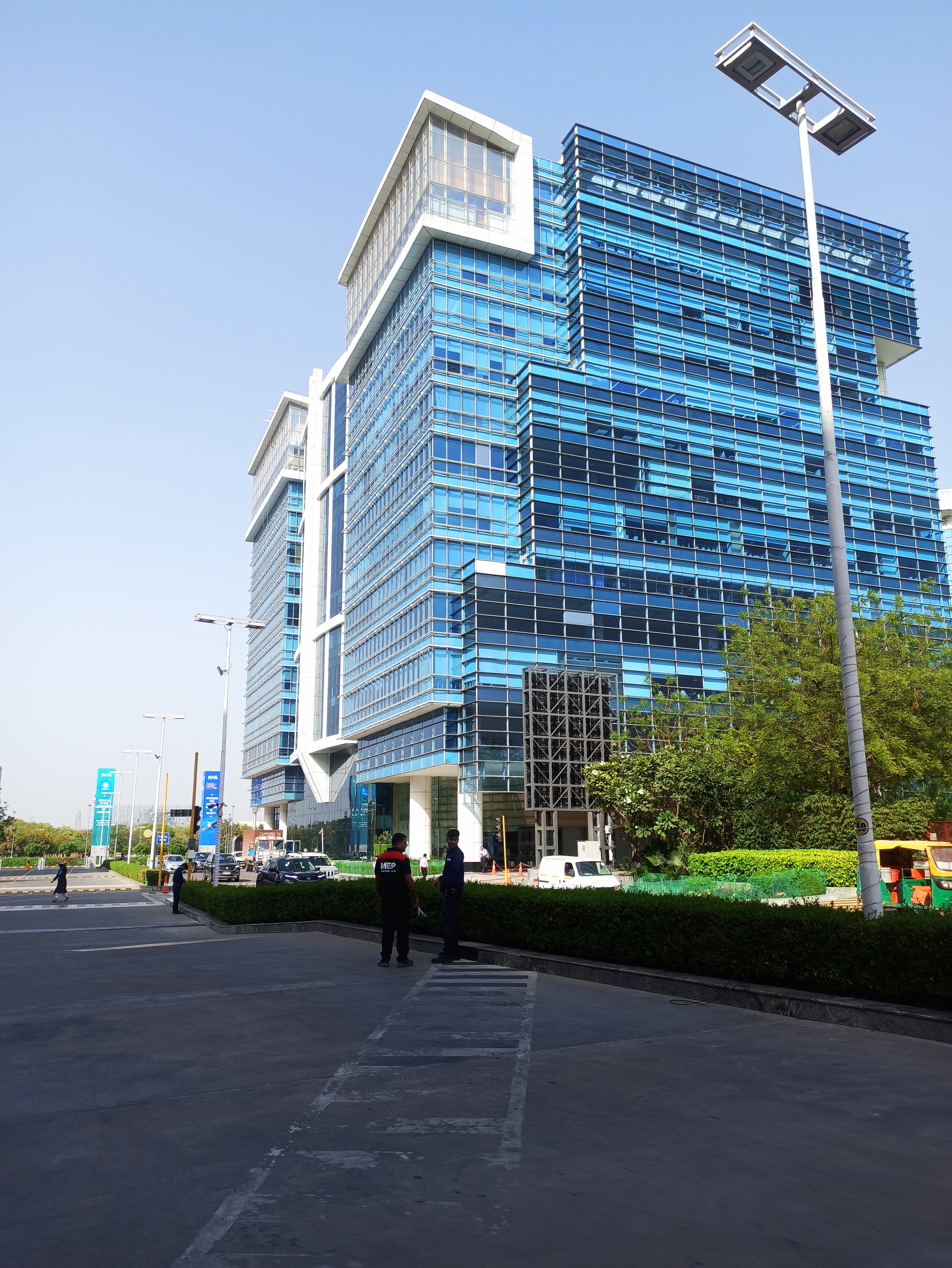
Infinity Towers, Cyber City

== See also ==
- Electronic City in Bangalore
- HITEC City in Hyderabad
- Bandra Kurla Complex in Mumbai
- Hinjawadi in Pune
- Genome Valley
- Whitefield, Bangalore
- New Town, Kolkata
- Bidhannagar, Kolkata
- Bengal Silicon Valley Tech Hub
- FinTech Hub, Kolkata
- InfoPark, Kochi
