= The Network Hub =

Canadian shared workspace company in Vancouver

- Type: Privately held company
- Industry: Coworking space
- Founded: 2006; 20 years ago
- Founders: John Van, Jay Catalan, Minna Van
- Headquarters: Vancouver, British Columbia, Canada
- Services: Mailbox rental service, meeting room rental, coworking space rental, and private office space rental in Vancouver
- Website: thenetworkhub.ca

The Network Hub is a Canadian coworking space in East Vancouver, British Columbia. It was launched in the summer of 2006 and is considered the longest running coworking space in Vancouver.

The space functions as a start-up incubator for entrepreneurs and small businesses. The Network Hub hosts businesses from different industries, including software developers, gaming companies, designers, consultants, and marketing service providers.

The Network Hub emphasizes community partnerships and networking activities. The stated goal of the organization is "To help people with great ideas launch their business faster and leaner".

In 2012, The Network Hub was nominated for a Small Business Influencer Award in the Corporations category. It has garnered recognition as the best coworking space in Vancouver and BC on multiple occasions. The company has also been featured in Mashable, CNN, CBC, and Get Connected magazine.

== History ==
The Network Hub was launched in 2006 by three high school students, John Van, Jay Catalan, and Minna Van who have experience as web designers and programmers with a background in entrepreneurship, and began as a 9,800 square-foot coworking space in Downtown Vancouver, Canada.

The Network Hub hosted eight small businesses in 2006, all headed by entrepreneurs under the age of 30. In 2007, the company hosted 20 small businesses, primarily in Information Technology. In 2009, The Network Hub hosted 35 businesses. The average time of use for long-term clients is two years.

In 2009, Get Connected magazine featured The Network Hub as an example of cost-saving business models in their Spring edition, and was featured by Canadian Broadcasting Company in 2010 as part of the growing trend of coworking spaces. Sarah Kessler featured The Network Hub as a model coworking space in several articles for Mashable's website in January 2011.

In 2011, the company expanded by opening a second location in New Westminster, providing a larger workspace. In the same year, The Network Hub announced plans to use the office space as an art gallery showcasing local Vancouver artists. Artists partnering with The Network Hub received one hundred percent of all sales. Featured artists include Scott Sueme, Jonathan Taggart, and Jason Athens.

In 2013, The Network Hub made history by establishing the world's first ski-in-ski-out coworking space in Whistler. This location was designed to appeal to entrepreneurs and small businesses desiring a mountain scenery workspace. The following year, The Network Hub opened its fourth location in Nanaimo, catering to individuals seeking a workspace on Vancouver Island.

In 2018, The Network Hub's nonprofit entity played a pivotal role as a confounding member in the creation of the first cultural community and coworking hub in Vancouver's Chinatown.

Since its inception, The Network Hub has expanded to multiple locations, including New Westminster, Whistler, Nanaimo, Richmond, Calgary, and Toronto.

== Membership ==
Members have access to drop-in deskspace, workspaces, shared and private offices, meeting rooms, courier services, and shared reception services. Monthly events focused on startups, small businesses, and technology are available to members. Renting options range from daily to yearly, offering flexibility to suit individual needs. Additional services include reception assistance, mailbox rental, mail forwarding, phone answering services, and virtual office services.

== Events ==
The Network Hub hosts monthly Meet-Up events for entrepreneurs in the Vancouver area. It organizes the largest monthly networking event in Vancouver, the Vancouver Entrepreneur Meetup, which has featured speakers such as Vancouver's Mayor Gregor Robertson. In addition to the Vancouver Entrepreneur event, The Network Hub also hosts other Meet-Up events that cover WordPress, web design, Drupal, Joomla, blogging, social media, and being a mom CEO. The Network Hub also hosted a WordPress Theme Hackathon.

=== Freelance camp Vancouver conference ===
In 2010, The Network Hub sponsored the first annual Freelance Camp Vancouver Conference. This program is designed for freelancers and provides skill training and networking opportunities. Previous trainings have included web design, invoicing, and social media networking strategies. The 2012 conference is scheduled for September.

=== NASA space apps challenge hack-a-thon ===
The Network Hub hosted 2012's NASA Space Apps Challenge Hack-A-Thon. The 48-hour event challenged members of the hacker community to develop new software to solve space-themed tasks for NASA.

=== Royal Columbian hospital fundraiser ===
In 2012, The Network Hub expanded community partnership activities. In June, the New Westminster branch sponsored the Royal Columbian Hospital Fundraiser in British Columbia.

=== Tech Training Hub ===
In 2019, The Network Hub launched a new tech skills learning program in partnership with CodeCast and ComIT.org. The program aims to benefit underemployed or unemployed individuals seeking work. The program offered free tech-focused job training for youth, students, and career changers. The program will serve up to 25 people at The Network Hub locations in downtown Vancouver and Nanaimo. Trainees will receive IT training, peer support, and access to workspaces. The program will culminate in a hiring event connecting trainees with companies like Google and Microsoft. Successful trainees will have the opportunity to work from The Network Hub's coworking offices. In 2020, the program was nominated for the 2020 Untapped B.C. Workplace Inclusion Awards in the non profit & public sector category.

== Awards ==
The Network Hub has won several awards, including the 2012 Small Business Influencer Award: Corporations and the 2018 Yelp's "People Love Us On Yelp" award.
