= Rapid Metro Gurgaon =

Rapid transit system serving Gurgaon, India

Overview
- Owner: Haryana Mass Rapid Transport Corporation Limited
- Locale: Gurgaon, Haryana, India
- Termini: Phase 2; Sector 55-56
- Stations: 11

Service
- Type: Light Metro
- System: Gurugram Metro
- Daily ridership: 30,000 on average; 48,000 on weekdays (2023)

Technical
- Line length: 12.85 km (7.98 mi)
- Character: Fully elevated and grade-separated
- Track gauge: 1,435 mm (4 ft 8 1/2 in) (standard gauge)
- Electrification: 750 V, DC via third rail

Rapid Metro Gurgaon is a light metro line of the Gurugram Metro serving the city of Gurgaon, Haryana, India. Rapid Metro connects the commercial areas of Gurgaon, and acts as a feeder link to the Delhi Metro with an interchange with its Yellow Line at Sikanderpur metro station.

Built by Rapid MetroRail Gurgaon Limited (RMGL) and its associated company, Rapid MetroRail Gurgaon South Limited (RMGSL), the system was the world's first fully privately financed modern light metro system. The venture received no investment from the Union Government, the Government of Haryana or any public sector undertaking. However, it was not the first privately financed rapid transit system, as the Metropolitan Railway in London was also privately financed. Originally scheduled to open in 2012, the first phase of the system commenced commercial operations on 14 November 2013. The second phase began commercial operations on 31 March 2017. In 2019, following financial difficulties faced by IL&FS, the company expressed its inability to continue operating the Rapid Metro. This led to a dispute between the concessionaires and the Haryana government over the termination of their concession agreements. Following proceedings before the Punjab and Haryana High Court, the Haryana government took over the system's operations on 22 October 2019, with the Delhi Metro Rail Corporation (DMRC) entrusted with operating the network.

The Rapid Metro has a total length of 12.85 kilometres (7.98 mi) and serves 11 stations. The system is fully elevated and uses standard-gauge tracks. Trains operate in three-car configurations and are powered by a 750-volt direct current (DC) traction system supplied through a third rail. Services operate daily, with trains running at intervals of approximately four minutes. The system was the first metro rail project in India to auction naming rights for its stations.

The existing Rapid Metro is operated by the Delhi Metro Rail Corporation (DMRC) on behalf of the Haryana Mass Rapid Transport Corporation (HMRTC). In September 2025, HMRTC initiated the process of transferring its operation and maintenance to Gurugram Metro Rail Limited (GMRL), which is also responsible for developing the new Gurugram Metro corridor.

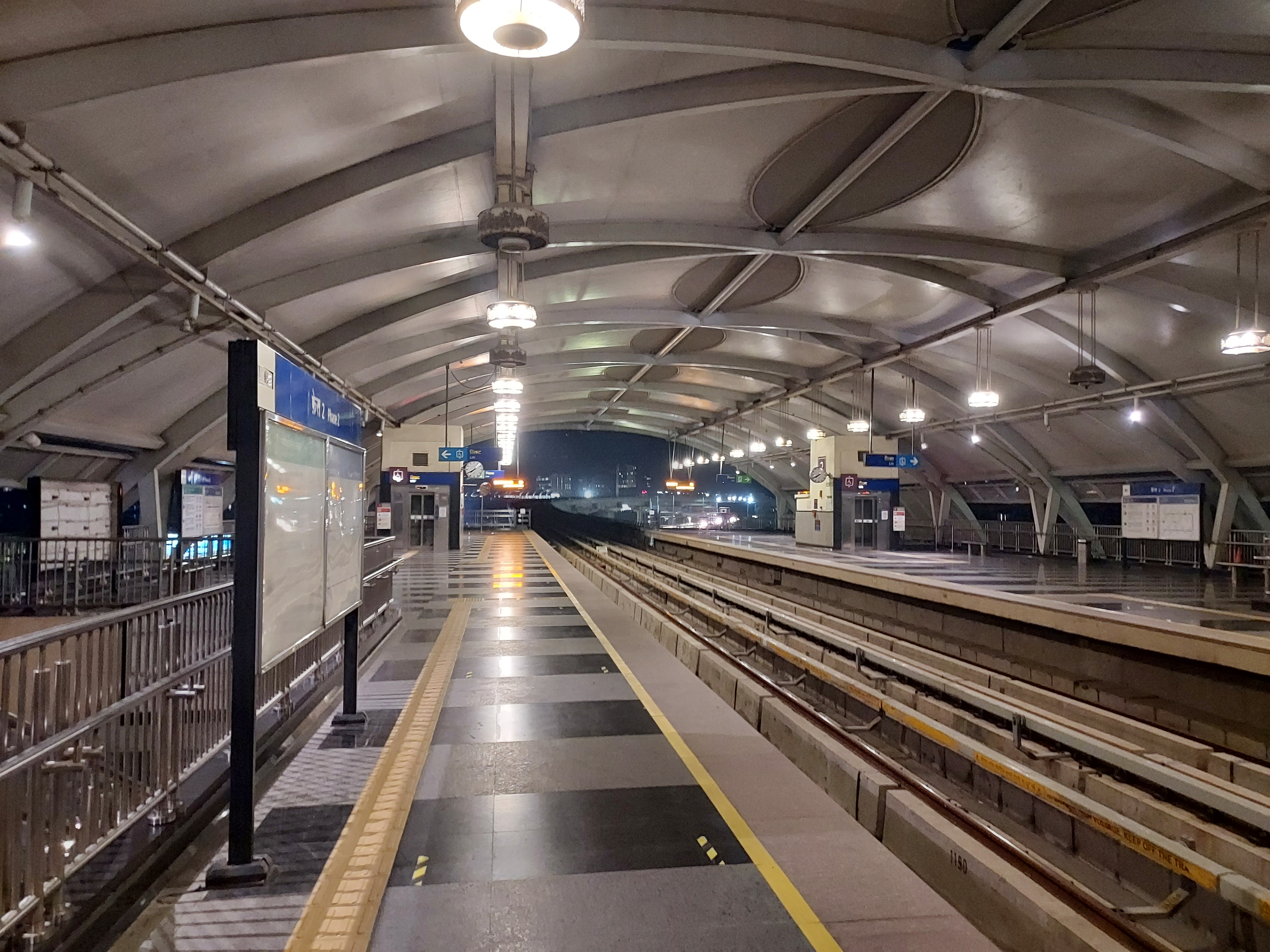
Platform No 1, towards Sector 55-56, Phase 2 Metro Station

== History ==
=== Line-1 Phase-1 ===
A 3.2 km (2.0 mi) metro line between Sikanderpur and National Highway 8 was originally proposed in September 2007. The Haryana Urban Development Authority (HUDA) invited expressions of interest in December 2008 and February 2009 to develop the metro line on a build-operate-transfer basis for a concession period of 99 years. However, real estate developer DLF wanted to provide metro connectivity to its Cyber City. A consortium comprising ITNL Enso Rail Systems Limited, IL&FS Transportation Networks Limited and DLF Metro Limited emerged as the sole respondent to the tender process. The proposed route was subsequently revised to 5.1 km (3.2 mi). Rapid Metro became India's first fully privately financed metro rail project. The project did not receive the 20 acres of land required for its construction at any concessional rate from the state.

The Rapid Metro project was implemented as a public-private partnership (PPP). The entire cost of the project was borne by the private party, which was also responsible for its operation and maintenance at its own expense. Under the concession agreement, the consortium was required to pay HUDA ₹7.65 billion (US$81.7 million) in connectivity charges, comprising an initial payment of ₹5 crore and annual payments of ₹40 crore from the 17th to the 35th year of operation. It was also required to share 5–10% of the revenue generated from advertising and property development with HUDA.

The contract for the ₹9 billion (US$96.1 million) project was awarded in July 2009, with completion scheduled within 30 months. The foundation stone was laid on 11 August 2009. The line was developed by Rapid Metro Gurgaon Limited (RMGL), which was responsible for its construction and operation.

Originally scheduled to open in 2012, the first phase of the system commenced commercial operations on 14 November 2013. The construction cost of the first phase was ₹1,088 crore (equivalent to ₹20 billion or US$220 million in 2026), while some contemporary reports put the expenditure at ₹1,450 crore (equivalent to ₹27 billion or US$290 million in 2026).

=== Line-1 Phase-2 ===
On 11 June 2013, IL&FS Engineering and Construction Company Limited informed the Bombay Stock Exchange that it had been awarded a contract worth ₹266.5 crore to construct the elevated viaducts for Phase II of the project. The company also stated that the project would be completed within 24 months. The company was later awarded a contract worth ₹84.3 crore to construct all five elevated stations in Phase II. The project completion period was specified as 24 months.

The southward extension is 6.6 km (4.10 mi) long and comprises double tracks, extending from Sikanderpur to Sector 55–56 in Gurgaon. It was constructed at an estimated cost of ₹2,423 crore (US$260 million). The extension comprises five new stations, in addition to the existing interchange station at Sikanderpur. Land and the right of way for the project were to be provided by HUDA. On 2 October 2012, Haryana Chief Minister Bhupinder Singh Hooda flagged off trial runs on Phase I of the metro, between DLF Phase 2 and DLF Phase 3 U-Block. On the same day, he also laid the foundation stone for Phase II of the project.

Construction work on Phase II began in April 2013, with an initial deadline of July 2015. However, the deadline was subsequently revised to mid-2016, September 2016 and then the last quarter of 2016. By June 2016, approximately 75% of the construction work on Phase II had been completed. Trial runs along the 6.3 km (3.91 mi) Phase II route began in November 2016 and were underway by December 2016. Rapid Metro authorities subsequently applied to the Commissioner of Metro Rail Safety (CMRS) for inspection of Phase II before commencing commercial operations. The second phase of the system opened to the public on 31 March 2017.

== Line-1 ==
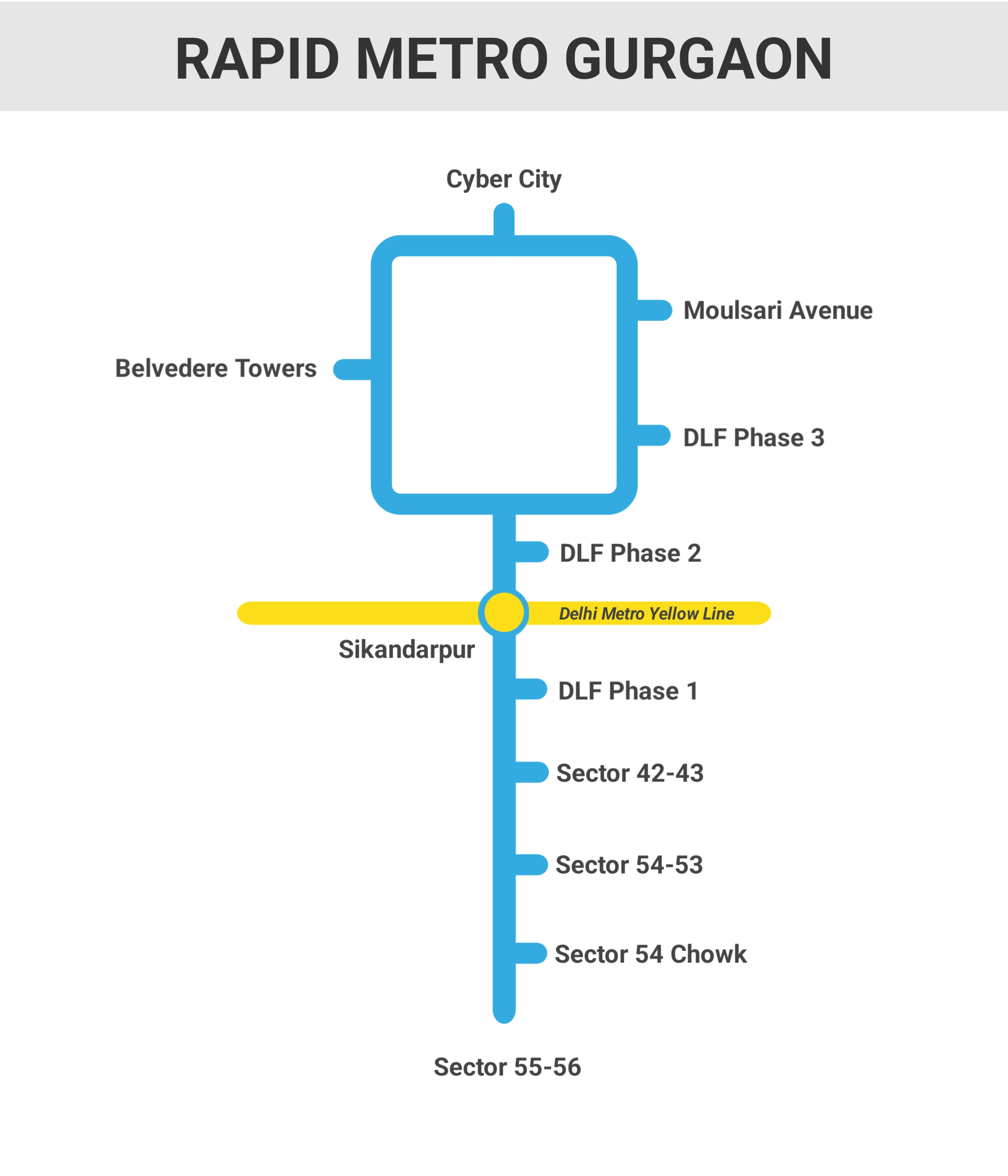
Rapid Metro Gurgaon transit diagram

=== Route ===
Line 1 was built in two phases. The first phase covers a distance of 5.1 km (3.2 mi) north of Sikanderpur. The section between Sikanderpur and DLF Phase 2 station is double-tracked, while the remaining stations are served by a single-track loop. The second phase is a 6.6 km (4.1 mi) southward extension from Sikanderpur to Sector 55–56 in Gurugram and mostly runs along Golf Course Road. This section of the line partially opened on 31 March 2017, except for two stations, Sector 42–43 and Sector 53–54, which opened on 25 April 2017. Platforms are 75 m (246 ft) long.

Sikanderpur station offers an interchange with Delhi Metro through a 90 m × 9 m (295 ft × 30 ft) walkway.

Line 1
#	Station Name		Phase	Opening	Interchange Connenction	Station Layout	Depot Connection	Depot Layout
#	English	Hindi	Phase	Opening	Interchange Connenction	Station Layout	Depot Connection	Depot Layout
1	Gurugram Sector 55–56	सैक्टर ५५-५६	2	31 March 2017	None	Elevated	Rapid Metro Rail Depot	Elevated
2	Gurugram Sector 54 Chowk	सैक्टर ५४ चौक	2	31 March 2017	None	Elevated	None	None
3	Gurugram Sector 53-54	सैक्टर ५३-५४	2	25 April 2017	None	Elevated	None	None
4	Gurugram Sector 42-43	सैक्टर ४२-४३	2	25 April 2017	None	Elevated	None	None
5	DLF Phase 1	फ़ेस १	2	31 March 2017	None	Elevated	None	None
6	Sikanderpur	सिकंदरपुर	1	14 November 2013	Yellow Line	Elevated	None	None
7	DLF Phase 2	फ़ेस २	1	14 November 2013	None	Elevated	None	None
8	Belvedere Towers	बेल्वेडियर टावर्स	1	14 November 2013	None	Elevated	None	None
9	Cyber City	साइबर सिटी	1	7 May 2014	None	Elevated	None	None
10	Moulsari Avenue	मौलसरी एवेन्यू	1	14 November 2013	None	Elevated	None	None
11	DLF Phase 3	फ़ेस ३	1	14 November 2013	None	Elevated	Rapid Metro Rail Depot	Elevated

=== Infrastructure ===
The system is fully elevated and operated automatically. Because of the features, several articles in railway magazines define the system as light metro.

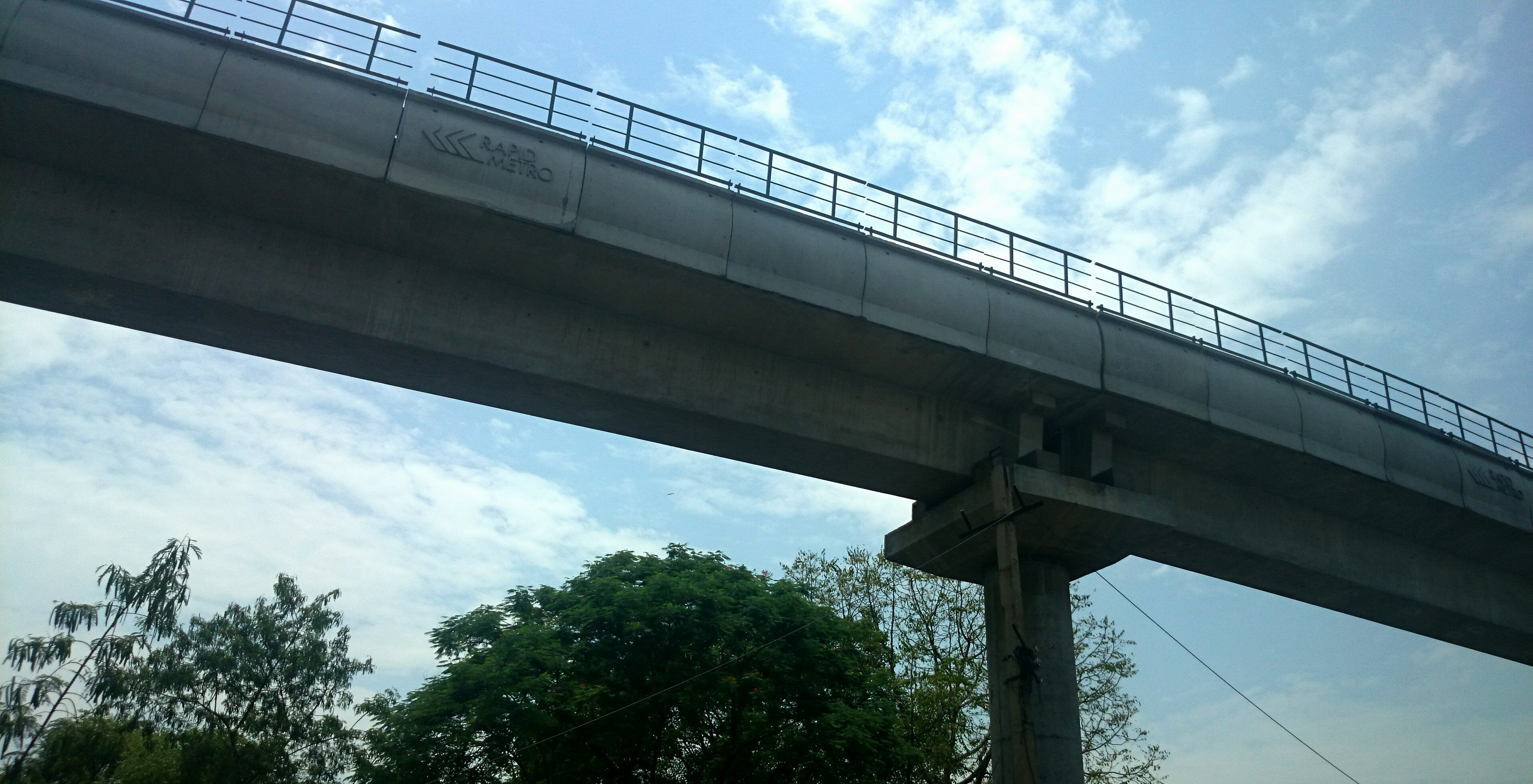
Gurgaon Metro track

==== Rolling stock ====
Siemens was awarded a turnkey contract for the Rapid Metro project in April 2010, which included the supply of five three-car metro trains. Siemens subcontracted CSR Zhuzhou (now part of CRRC) to manufacture the five aluminium-bodied, air-conditioned trainsets in China. RMGL later ordered seven additional three-car trainsets for the Phase II extension. All seven had arrived in Gurgaon by 5 February 2016, including the final four trainsets.

The three-coach trains are silver and blue in colour. Each train is 59.94 metres (196 ft 8 in) long, with coaches measuring 2.8 metres (9 ft 2 in) in width. Each coach has roof-mounted air conditioning and four doors on either side. A train can accommodate approximately 800 passengers. The system was designed to carry up to 30,000 passengers per hour.

=== Operations ===
==== Operator ====
The first phase of the line was developed by Rapid MetroRail Gurgaon Limited (RMGL), which was incorporated by a consortium comprising IL&FS Rail Limited (IRL), IL&FS Transportation Networks Limited (ITNL) and DLF Metro Limited. DLF owned several properties near the stations, particularly in Cyber City, while IL&FS was the majority stakeholder in the venture. DLF's shareholding subsequently fell from 26% to less than 1% following the conversion of preference shares held by ITNL in November 2013, effectively ending its association with the project. Following this, ITNL held approximately 82.8% of RMGL. On 11 February 2016, ITNL announced that it had sold a 49% stake in RMGL for ₹509.9 crore (US$54 million), to its parent company, Infrastructure Leasing & Financial Services Ltd (IL&FS), as part of its efforts to reduce debt.

Rapid Metro charges a flat fare of ₹20 (21¢ US) for most journeys, while journeys between Sector 55–56, Sector 54 Chowk or Sector 53–54 and Belvedere Towers, Cyber City, Moulsari Avenue or DLF Phase 3 cost ₹35 (37¢ US). Delhi Metro smart cards and QR-based tickets are also accepted on Rapid Metro through an interoperable ticketing system. The automatic fare collection system was supplied by Thales Group.

==== Ridership ====
Ridership on the Rapid Metro has been below initial expectations. Phase I was projected to carry 100,000 passengers per day, but its actual daily ridership averaged around 30,000–35,000. Even after the addition of Phase II, average daily ridership in 2018 remained around 50,000–55,000. Urban Transport News described the Rapid Metro as a "failure", citing its high cost, low ridership and poor location. However, ridership has increased in recent years, with the system recording an average of approximately 53,000 passengers per day in 2025–26, according to HMRTC data.

==== Frequency ====
Rapid Metro services operate daily, with the first train departing Sector 55–56 at 06:00 and the last train departing at 22:00. The trains consist of three coaches each. Trains have a maximum speed of 80 km/h (50 mph), and operate at an average speed of 40 km/h (25 mph).

==== Safety ====
For passenger safety, emergency stop plungers are installed on every platform, while the Blue Light Station feature allows passengers to contact the Control Room. A press-to-talk button inside each coach enables passengers to communicate directly with the train driver in the event of an emergency.

==== Security ====
Initially, security at the Rapid Metro was provided by a private security agency, with Haryana Police assisting in emergencies. Following the takeover of operations by HMRTC, the Haryana government decided that security at metro projects and stations in the state should be handled by Haryana Police, instead of deploying the Central Industrial Security Force (CISF), whose services were considered expensive. Gurugram Police has a dedicated Metro Police Station. CCTV cameras are installed in the trains and at stations for surveillance, and HMRTC approved a ₹11.76 crore (US$1.3 million) project in January 2026 to replace the CCTV cameras and passenger information systems in the Rapid Metro trains.

== Gurugram Metro integration ==
The Gurugram Metro project is being developed by Gurugram Metro Rail Limited (GMRL), a joint venture of the Government of India and the Government of Haryana. The 28.5 km (17.7 mi) Millennium City Centre–Cyber City corridor, also known as the Gurugram Metro corridor, will consist of 27 elevated stations, including a 1.85 km (1.15 mi) spur connecting Basai Village to the Dwarka Expressway at Sector 101. The corridor will connect Old Gurugram with New Gurugram, passing through Sector 45, Cyber Park, Subhash Chowk, Hero Honda Chowk, Udyog Vihar Phase 6, Sector 10, Basai Village, Sector 9, Ashok Vihar and Palam Vihar, among other areas, before terminating at Cyber City. It will provide an interchange with the existing Rapid Metro at Cyber City and the Delhi Metro Yellow Line at Millennium City Centre.

GMRL has been entrusted with implementing the project, including the construction of the metro corridor. Construction began in September 2025, and the project is being developed in phases.

== In Popular Culture ==
In 2026, scenes from the Rani Mukerji-starrer Mardaani 3 were filmed around the DLF Phase 3 section of the Rapid Metro.

== See also ==
- Urban rail transit in India
  - Delhi Metro
  - Noida Metro
