= Sector 55–56 metro station =

Metro station in Haryana, India

Gurugram Sector 55–56

General information
- Location: 28.423278°N 77.105221°E
- Owner: Haryana Mass Rapid Transport Corporation Limited (HMRTC)
- Operator: Delhi Metro Rail Corporation (DMRC)
- Platforms: Platform-1 → Train terminates Platform-2 → Phase 3
- Tracks: 2

Construction
- Structure type: Elevated
- Platform levels: 2
- Accessible: Yes

Other information
- Station code: S55

History
- Opened: 31 March 2017; 9 years ago
- Electrified: 750 V, DC via third rail

Services
Preceding station	Rapid Metro Gurgaon	Following station
Terminus	Line 1	Sector 54 Chowk towards Phase 3 via Moulsari Avenue
Route map
Location
- Location within Delhi Location within Haryana

Gurugram Sector 55-56 is a station of the Rapid Metro Gurgaon in Haryana, India which is owned by Haryana Mass Rapid Transport Corporation Limited (HMRTC) and operated by Delhi Metro Rail Corporation (DMRC). Earlier it was operated by Rapid Metro Gurgaon Limited (RMGL). The station was opened to the public on 31 March 2017.
