= Phase 3 metro station =

Metro station in Haryana, India

DLF Phase 3

General information
- Coordinates: 28.493512°N 77.093676°E
- Owner: Haryana Mass Rapid Transport Corporation Limited (HMRTC)
- Operator: Delhi Metro Rail Corporation (DMRC)
- Platforms: Platform-1 → Sector 55–56
- Tracks: 2

Construction
- Structure type: Elevated
- Platform levels: 2
- Accessible: Yes

Other information
- Station code: DL3

History
- Opened: 14 November 2013; 12 years ago
- Electrified: 750 V, DC via third rail

Services
Preceding station	Rapid Metro Gurgaon	Following station
Moulsari Avenue One-way operation	Line 1	Terminus
Phase 2 towards Sector 55–56	Line 1	Terminus
Route map
Location
- Location within Delhi Location within Haryana

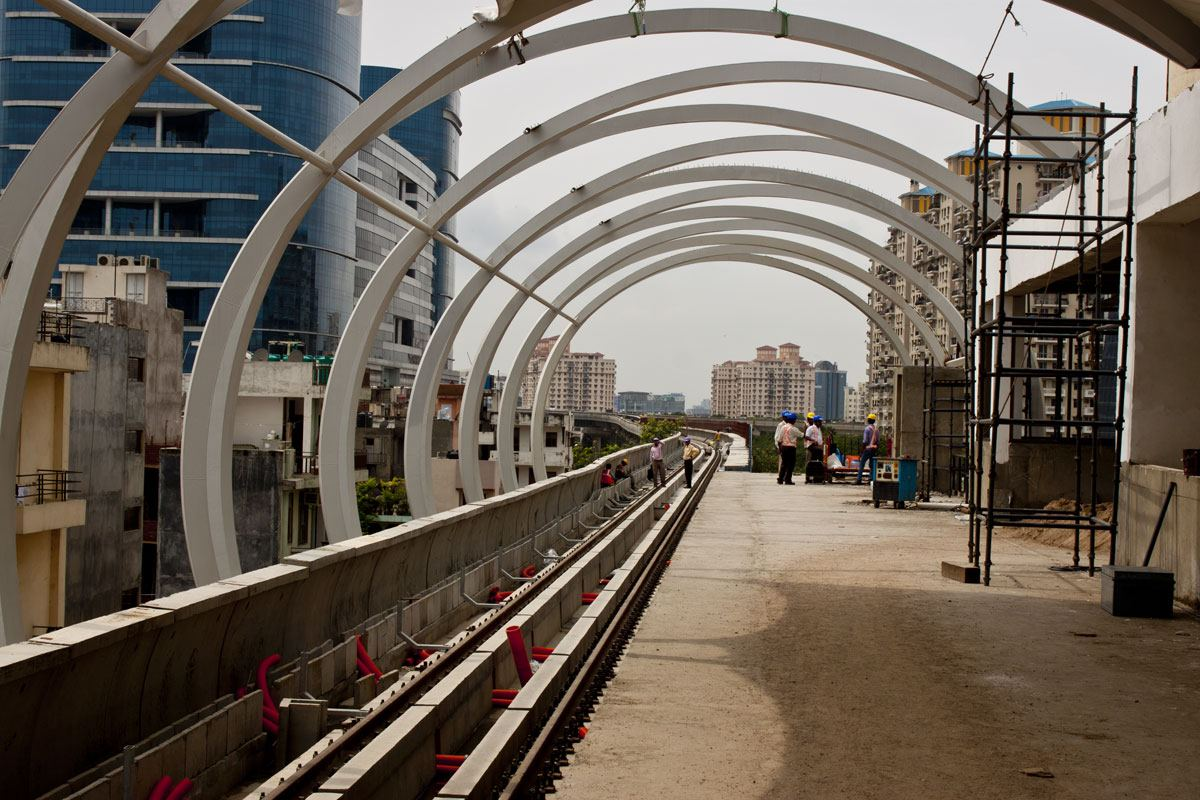
Underconstruction phase 3 metro station.

DLF Phase 3 is a station of the Rapid Metro Gurgaon opened in November 2013. It is owned by Haryana Mass Rapid Transport Corporation Limited (HMRTC) and operated by Delhi Metro Rail Corporation (DMRC). Earlier it was operated by Rapid Metro Gurgaon Limited (RMGL).
