= Moulsari Avenue metro station =

Metro station in Haryana, India

Moulsari Avenue

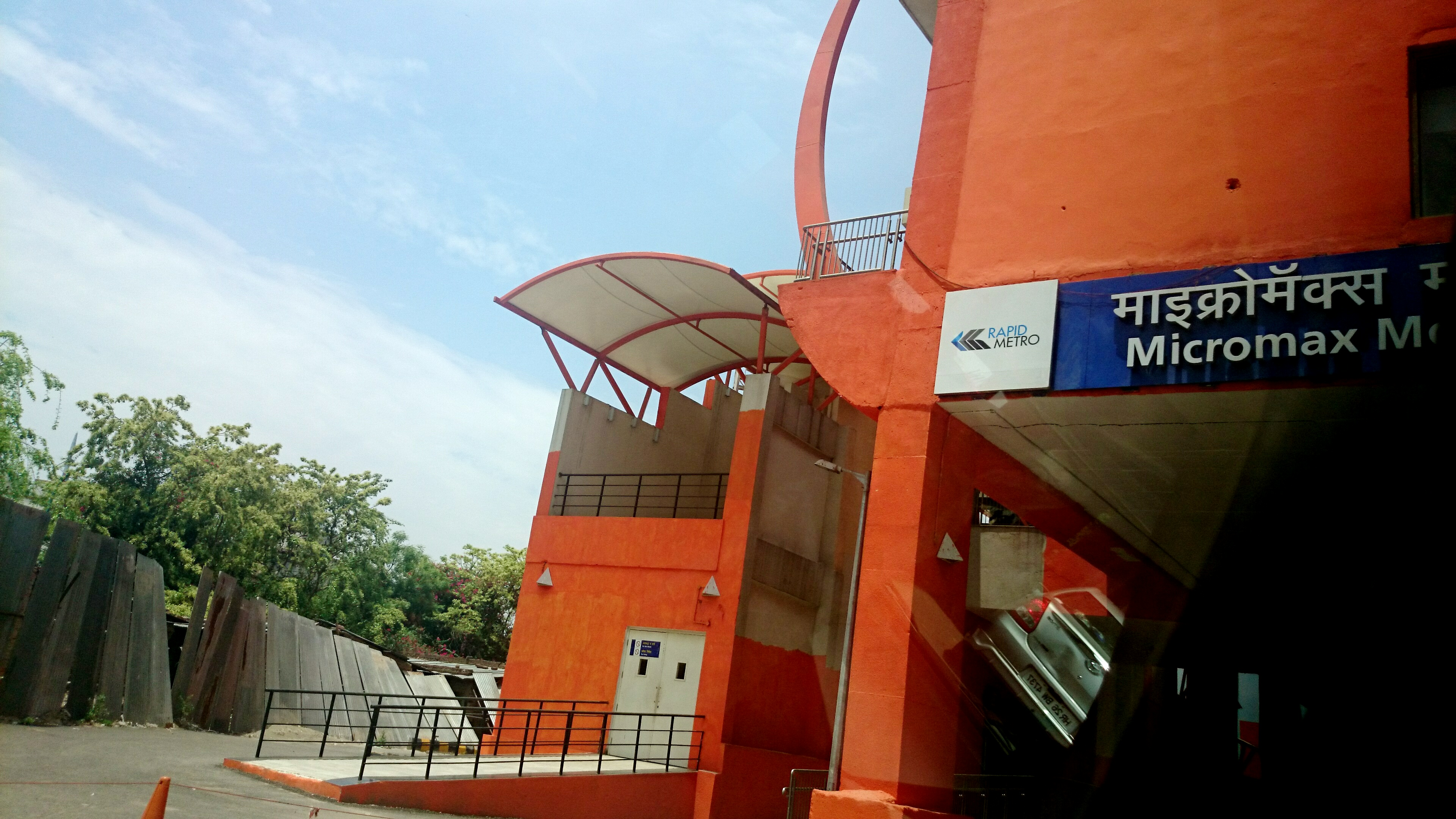

General information
- Coordinates: 28.500697°N 77.094600°E
- Owner: Haryana Mass Rapid Transport Corporation Limited (HMRTC)
- Operator: Delhi Metro Rail Corporation (DMRC)
- Platforms: Platform-1 → Phase 3
- Tracks: 2

Construction
- Structure type: Elevated
- Platform levels: 2
- Accessible: Yes

Other information
- Station code: MAL

History
- Opened: 14 November 2013; 12 years ago
- Electrified: 750 V, DC via third rail

Services
Preceding station	Rapid Metro Gurgaon	Following station
Cyber City One-way operation	Line 1	Phase 3 Terminus
Route map
Location
- Location within Delhi Location within Haryana

Moulsari Avenue is a station of the Rapid Metro Gurgaon opened in November 2013. It is owned by Haryana Mass Rapid Transport Corporation Limited (HMRTC) and operated by Delhi Metro Rail Corporation (DMRC). Earlier it was operated by Rapid Metro Gurgaon Limited (RMGL).

The station was named after Indian handset manufacturing company Micromax Informatics under corporate branding of stations, but its rights expired in 2019. This metro station is well connected to DLF industrial city and the headquarters of many MNCs. It's the nearest metro station for Ambience Mall, Gurgaon.

== Connections ==
Bus transport service Gurugaman Route No 112 has also been availed by the chief minister of Haryana, Manohar Lal Khattar, from Haryana Vidyut Prasaran Nigam Sector 55–56 to Krishna Chowk Palam Vihar, which also includes Mircomax Moulsari Avenue Metro Station as a bus stop.
