= List of educational institutions in Gurgaon =

This is a list of schools located in the city of Gurugram, formerly known as Gurgaon, in Haryana, India. Note that this article refers to schools in the territorial limits of the city of Gurugram, not from the district of Gurugram.

== Private institutes ==
- K.R. Mangalam University
- BML Munjal University
- GD Goenka University
- Great Lakes Institute of Management (GLIM)
- Infinity Business School
- The NorthCap University
- Management Development Institute (MDI)
- Sushant University

== Schools ==
- Blue Bells Model School
- Gurugram Public School
- Heritage Xperiential Learning School
- Kendriya Vidyalaya AFS Gurgaon
- Lancers International School
- SCR Public School
- Shalom Hills International School
- The Shri Ram School

== IB School ==
International Baccalaureate schools in Gurgaon district include:-

- Lancers International School
- Scottish High International School
- Pathways School, Baliawas
- Pathways World School, Aravali
- DPS International Edge
- Heritage Intl Xperiential School
- Amity Global School

== CBSE schools ==
The table below shows the secondary schools affiliated with the CBSE within the district of Gurgaon.

School No.	School	Ref.
531621	Alpine Convent School, Gurgaon	
531730	Ambience Public Schools	
—N/a	Made Easy School	
	Scottish High International School	1
530968	SCR Public School	
—N/a	SCR Model School	
—N/a	SCR Global School	
530753	Aditya Army Public School	
530318	Ajanta Public School	
530529	American Montessori Public School	
530535	Amity International School	
530744	St. Angel's School	
530400	Aravali Public School	
—N/a	The Ardee School	
530587	Asian Public School	
530385	Ascent Public School	
530364	Basant Valley Public School	
—N/a	Bharti International Convent School	
530482	Blue Bells Public School	
530101	Chiranjiv Bharti School	
530142	Colonel's Central Academy	
530264	Colonel's Public School	
530393	St. Crispin's Senior Secondary School	
530096	DAV Public School	
530059	DPS Mewat Model School	
530062	DPS Mewat Model School	
530404	DPS Mewat Model School	
530233	Delhi Public School, Maruti Kunj	
530405	Delhi Public School, Sector 45	
530598	Delhi Public School, Sushant Lok	
530232	Dev Samaj Vidya Niketan	
530357	Drona Public School	
530015	Our Lady of Fatima Convent Secondary School	
530570	Lady Florence Public School	
530525	GD Goenka World School	
530889	GEMS International School	
	Satya School	
530578	Green Dale Public School	
530649	Greenwood Public School	
—N/a	Gurgaon Valley School	
530417	Gurugram Public School	
531088	The Maurya School	
530150	Gyan Devi Public School	
530550	Heritage Xperiential Learning School	
—N/a	Indus World School	
530748	J J School of Education	
530746	Jhankar High School	
—N/a	Kinder Valley International School	
530421	Lord Krishna International School	
530295	Kuldeep Singh Memorial Public School	
530499	Laxmi International School	
530499	Lord Jesus Public School	
530293	Lions Public School	
530241	Maharishi Vidya Mandir Public School	
530699	Manav Rachna International School	
530579	Maru Mal Boys Senior Secondary School	
530208	Meenakshi Public School	
530680	Mewat Model School Nagina	
530689	Mewat Model School	
530210	St. Michael's Senior Secondary School	
530230	St. PBN Public School	
—N/a	Pathways World School	
530410	The Pine Crest School	
530398	Pole Star Public School	
—N/a	Presidium Senior Secondary School	
—N/a	Rabindranath World School	
530732	Rajendra Public School	
530665	Rajmala Senior Secondary School	
530077	Rao Lal Singh Public School	
531206	Red Roses Public School	
—N/a	Ridge Valley School	
—N/a	Rishi Public School	
530654	Rockford Convent High School	
530677	Royal Public Senior Secondary School	
530021	Rotary Public School	
530674	Ryan International School	
530014	S. D. Adarsh Vidyalaya	
—N/a	SD Memorial High School	
—N/a	Salwan Montessori School	
530273	Salwan Public School	
530660	Savitri Devi Vidya Niketan	
530693	Shalom Hills International School	
530527	Shanti Niketan Public School	
530268	Sharda International School	
530205	Sherwood Convent School	
—N/a	Shemford Futuristic Academy, Gurugram	
—N/a	Shikshantar	
530566	Sri Shiv Chaitanya Academy School	
—N/a	Shiv Nadar School	
530539	Shiv Public Senior Secondary School	
—N/a	The Shri Ram School Aravali	
530023	Shri S.N. Sidheshwar Sr. Sec. Public School	
530245	St. Soldier Public School	
530472	Starex International School	
530176	Summer Fields School	
530678	Suncity World School	
—N/a	The Sylvan Trails School	
530521	Tagore International School	
530629	Universiol Public School	
—N/a	Vega Schools	
—N/a	VIBGYOR Group of Schools	
530691	Vidya Bhawan Public Senior Secondary School	
530315	Vivekanand Academy	
530573	West Academy	
553057	Shiksha Bharti Public School	
531086	U.S SCHOOL	
531601	Suraj School, Sector 75 Gurgaon	
531622	Suraj School, Sector 56 Gurgaon	

== ICSE Schools ==
- MatriKiran School
- Scottish High International School

== See also ==
- List of institutions of higher education in Haryana
