= Safdarjung (Delhi) =

Neighborhood in Delhi, India

Safdar Jung
- Neighborhood
- Location in Delhi, India
- Coordinates: 28.563286°N 77.191155°E
- Country: India
- State: Delhi
- District: South Delhi

Languages
  - Official: Hindi
- Time zone: UTC+5:30 (IST)
- PIN: 110029
- Planning agency: SDMC

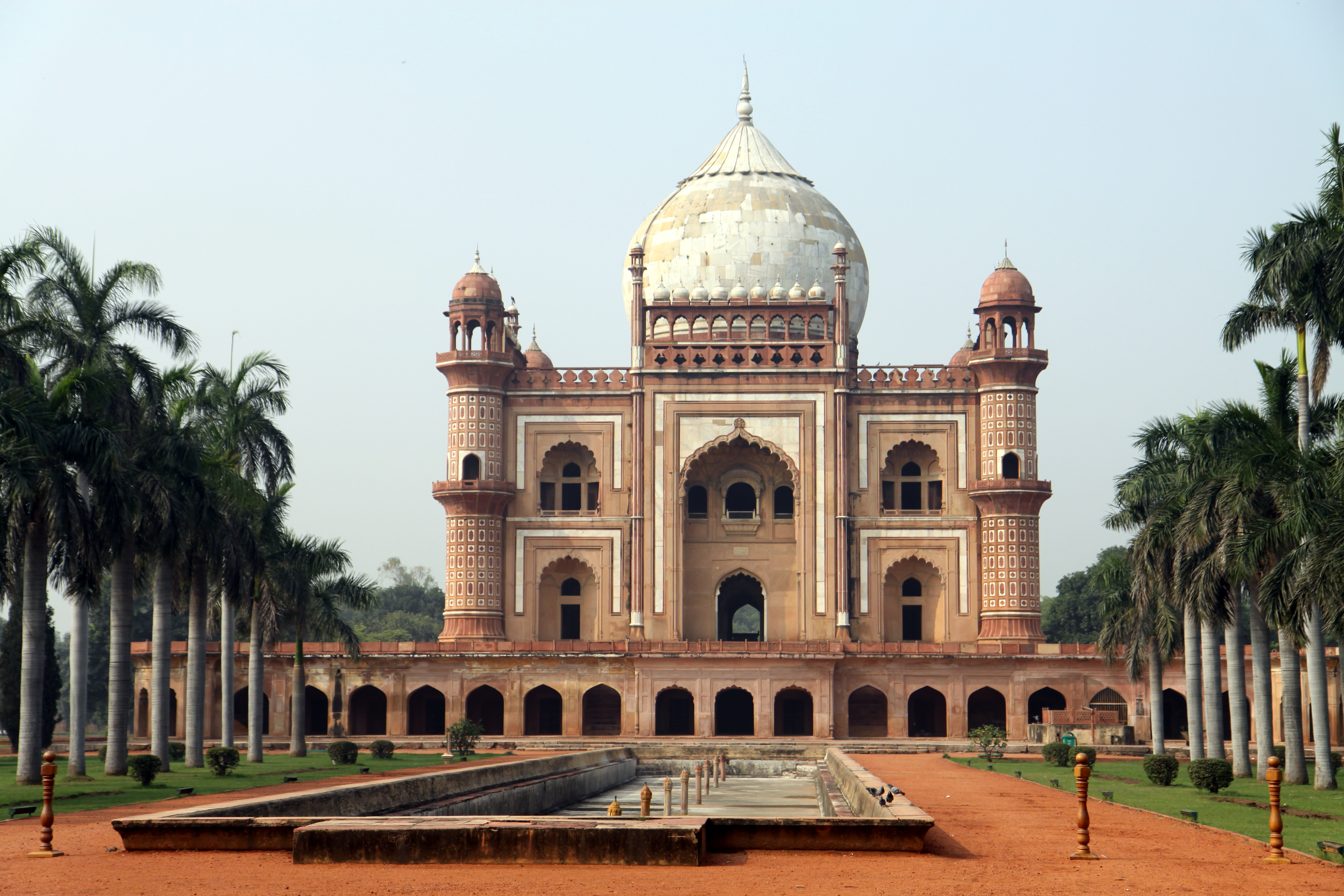
Safdarjung's tomb, Delhi, after which the area is named

Safdarjung area consists of mainly two localities in South Delhi, namely Safdarjung Enclave and Safdarjung Development Area (SDA). There are several districts (called colonies) in Delhi located south of the Safdarjung's Tomb.

== Safdarjung Enclave ==
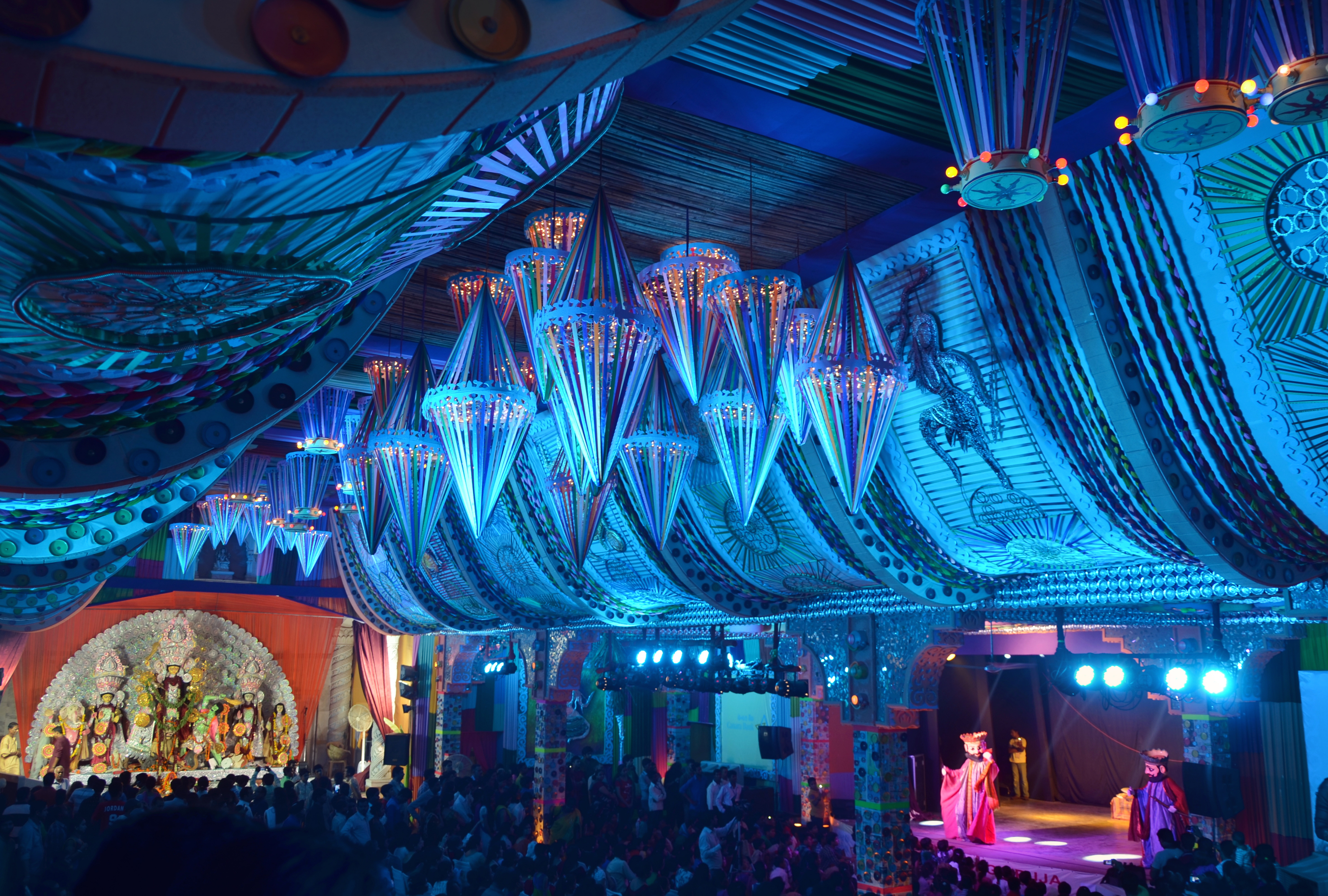
Durga Puja celebrations, Matri Mandir, Safdarjung Enclave, Delhi, 2014

Safdarjung Enclave, developed by the Delhi Lease and Finance later DLF Limited after acquiring the farmlands from Humayunpur Village in the early 1960s under then Prime Minister Pandit Jawaharlal Nehru is located just south of the Ring Road and north of the Hauz Khas Deer Park. South of Hauz Khas village is the Safdarjung Development Area (SDA), built in the 1960s as an extension towards the south. Both colonies are primarily residential. Part of the land was also developed on the acquired Jat-dominated village of Mohammadpur.

Safdarjung Enclave built after the Partition did not include land grants for refugees from what is now Pakistan.

The airstrip next to Safdarjung's Tomb that occupies the area between it and Safdarjung Enclave, formerly Delhi's main airport, is now known as Safdarjung Airport and is the home of the Delhi Flying Club. Many official flights for the Central and State government also leave and arrive here rather than at Delhi's main airport Indira Gandhi International Airport (formerly Palam Airport).

== Major Schools in Safdarjung Enclave ==
- St. Mary's School
- Green Fields School
- Hill Grove Public School (Now known as Ambience Public School)
- Delhi Police Public School
- Sarvodaya Govt. Senior Secondary School

== Hospitals in Safdarjung Enclave ==
- Sukhmani Hospital
- Centre For Sight
- Aashlok Fortis Hospital
- Diyos Hospital
- Bhagat Medicare Centre And Nursing Home
- Sanjeevani Plus Hospital

== Major Schools in SDA ==
- St. Paul’s School
- Sahoday Senior Secondary School

== See also ==
- Safdarjung railway station
- National Disaster Management Authority (India)
