= St. Crispin's Senior Secondary School =

- St. Crispin's Senior Secondary School Emblem

Location
- New Railway Road, Old Gurgaon; Gurgaon, Haryana, 122001; India
- Coordinates: 28.463°N 77.029°E

Information
- School type: Senior secondary
- Motto: Let Your Life Speak
- Founded: 1895
- Status: Open
- School board: Central Board of Secondary Education
- School code: 530393
- Principal: Sujata Chawdhry
- Classes offered: Nursery to 12
- Language: English
- Houses: Jhelum , Mandakini , Bhramputra , Kaveri
- Website: crispinsschool.com

St. Crispin's Senior Secondary School (or Saint Crispin's Senior Secondary School, often abbreviated as St. Crispin's Sr. Sec. School) is an English-medium senior secondary school in Gurgaon, Haryana. Having been founded in 1895, the school is one of the oldest in Gurgaon.

== History ==
St. Crispin's Sr. Sec. School was founded in 1895. The school was previously a vocational one meant to give industrial training to its students. The school later became an educational institution in 1924. The level of the school was raised to secondary level in 1975 which was followed by further elevation to senior secondary level in 1987. The school got affiliated to CBSE in 2002.

== Overview ==
The school is affiliated to CBSE and offers classes from Nursery to 12th in all streams, i.e., science, commerce and humanities. It is currently governed by its principal, Sujata Chawdhry, and is an independent school, i.e., it is run without any financial aid from the government.

== Houses ==
St. Crispin's Senior Secondary School consists of four houses, each named after river- Brahmaputra, Mandakini, Jhelum, Kaveri. Each house is headed by a house in-charge and supported by a team of house captains and vice-captains. The house system is required for the inter-house activities held occasionally in the school.

House	Colour	Relevant Indian rivers
Jhelum	Red	Jhelum
Mandakini	Yellow	Mandakini
Bharamaputra	Green	Bharamaputra
Kaveri	Blue	Kaveri

== See also ==
- List of Schools in Gurgaon
