= Blue Bells Model School =

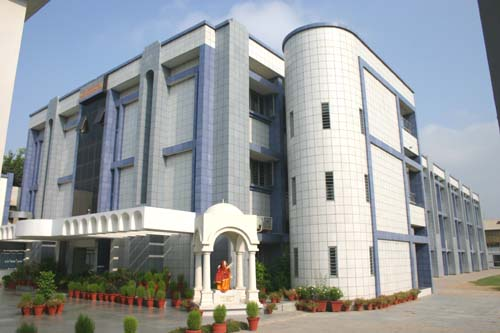
- To contribute to cognitive, emotional and physical development of children.
- Gurgaon, Haryana; India

Information
- Type: Private
- Motto: Be Honest, Be Brave
- Established: 1980
- President: Mrs. Suman Gulati
- Principal: Mrs. Alka singh
- Grades: Class 3 - 12
- Enrollment: 2500
- Campus size: 5-acre (20,000 m^{2})
- Campus type: Suburban
- Affiliation: CCE
- Website: www.bluebells.org

Blue Bells Model School is a co-educational English medium school affiliated to CBSE Board, located in the city of Gurgaon, Haryana, India. Founded in the year in 1980 the School was affiliated to CBSE in 1986 till class X. Later, in 1991, the school was further upgraded to enroll students in class XII. The apex body of the school is D.R. Memorial Bal Shiksha Vikas Society.

== House system ==
The school is divided into four houses:

- Indira Gandhi (green)
- Mother Teresa (blue)
- Nehru (red)
- Tagore (yellow)

Each house is under the charge of a House Mister/Mistress along with House Captains and Prefects. Inter-House competitions are organized house wise wherein students from each house compete against each other's house to make their house win.

== Location and area ==
The school is located in sector 4, Gurugram. It is an area of 5 acres. Daily New Activities Are Planned On the Basis of specified curriculum & CCE pattern practices.

== Events and activities ==
- Academic Carnival Unwrapping Learning Packages
- Empezar’ – A Beginning, Health and Wellness Festival 2019
- Kargil Vijay Diwas by NCC

== Awards and recognition ==
- Topped Gurugram for Class X results in 2019
- Topped Humanities in 2017 for Class XII
- Winner of Banner Contest at HT-PACE's Inquizitive 2017

== Notable alumni ==
- Rajkumar Rao
