= Gurugram Metropolitan Development Authority =

Urban government body in Haryana, India

Gurugram Metropolitan Development Authority (GMDA) is a government body that looks after the development and maintenance of Gurugram (erstwhile Gurgaon) city. It is responsible for the urban planning, infrastructure, and mobility of the city.

== Partnerships ==
- Partnered with Cisco to manage the city infrastructure in a unified way.
