= Vega Schools =

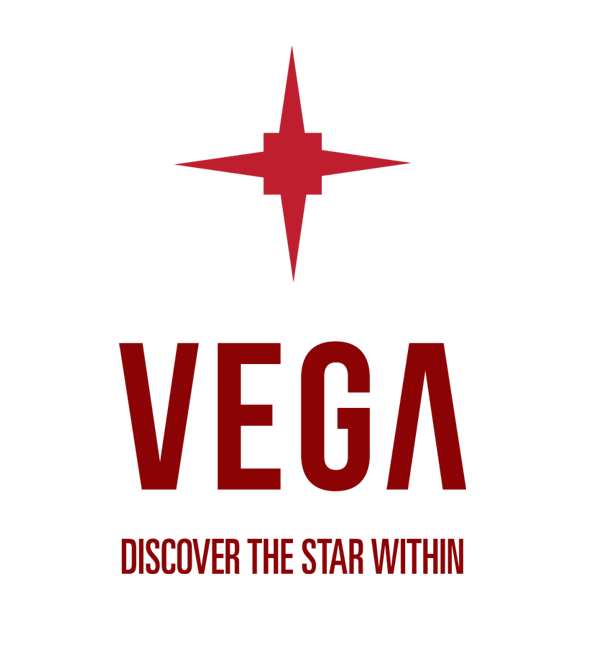

Location
- Sector 48, Gurgaon – 122018; Haryana, India; 28.410766°N 77.038010°E

Information
- School type: Private
- Motto: Discover the star within
- Established: 2012
- School district: Gurgaon district
- Grades: KG-12
- Website: vega.edu.in

Vega Schools are a chain of co-educational, private K-12 schools in Gurgaon, Haryana state, India. The medium of instruction is in English and the CBSE & CCE (Continuous and Comprehensive Evaluation) core curriculum. Vega is the only North Indian member school of the Global Schools Alliance - an alliance of 15 schools around the world, also with ties to candidates of Harvard Graduate School of Education to set up a research program to explore the various aspects.

== History ==
Vega Schools were established in 2016 by Co Founders Dr. Steven Edwards and Sandeep Hooda. The leadership board comprises David Price, OBE, Andrew Raymer, Padmashri Awardee Gowri Ishwaran and school design expert Lene Jensby Lange. Corporate professionals Rajan Hooda (JP Morgan, McKinsey and Citigroup) and Sunil Radhakrishna (DCM Shriram Group) are also members of the leadership board.

== Campus and infrastructure ==
Vega Schools have two campuses in Gurgaon, in sector 48 and sector 76. Campuses have centralized AC systems with PM10 and PM2.5 air purification system and school environment is air pollution free.

== Events ==
School has organized several editions of Gurgaon Children's Literature Festival (GCLF) among children and parents. Literature festival had sessions of storytelling and interactive workshops and drew the attention of over 3,000 parents and children. Parents and children also explored a collection of books from national and international publishers.

== See also ==
- The Shriram School, Gurgaon
- Shiv Nadar Schools, Gurgaon
- Pathways Schools, Gurgaon
