= Sharda International School =

Location
- Shiv Nagar, Pataudi Road; Gurgaon, Haryana – 122 001, (India)
- Coordinates: 28°27′2″N 77°0′35″E

Information
- Established: 14 December 1994
- Founder: Shri Narendra Kumar Rao
- School district: Gurgaon
- Oversight: Shri Hardhyan Singh; Memorial Education Society
- Chairperson: Shri Narendra Kumar Rao
- Principal: Abha Raghav
- Gender: Co-Educational
- Age: 3 to 18
- Houses: Raman, Subhash, Tagore, and Teressa
- Accreditation: Central Board of Secondary Education (CBSE) #530268
- Affiliation: All India Central Board of Secondary Education
- Website: www.shardainternationalschool.in

Sharda International School is an Indian co–educational, senior secondary school (or high school). The English-speaking institution was established in 1994, in the city of Gurgaon, Haryana and serves students ages 14–18. The school has been honored with ISO 9001:2000 certification in recognition of their students receiving 100 percent testing scores on the Central Board of Secondary Education (CBSE) Board Examinations.

== History ==
Sharda International School was founded on 14 December 1994, by Shri Narendra Kumar Rao. They opened their doors in April 1995. The school is accredited by the Central Board of Secondary Education and operates under the authority of the Shri Hardhyan Singh Memorial Education Society.

== Classes offered ==
Science

- Physics
- Chemistry
- Biology
- Mathematics
- Computer Science
- Physical Education

Commerce

- Accounting
- Economics
- Business
