= Blue Bells Public School =

Public school in Gurgaon, Haryana, India

Brahm Dutt Blue Bells Public School

Location
- Gurgaon, Haryana, India; 28°27′15.85″N 77°0′10.15″E

Information
- Type: English-medium school
- Established: April 10, 2003; 23 years ago
- Gender: Coeducational
- Age range: Nursery to Year 12
- Website: bbpublic.bluebells.org

Blue Bells Public School is a co-educational English-medium school located in Sector 10 Gurgaon, Haryana, India, serving students from nursery to Year 12. The school became affiliated with the Central Board of Secondary Education (CBSE) during the 2010-2011 academic year.

== History ==
Construction of the school started in October 2000 and it became functional in 2003 with a total of 154 students. The school contains a library; computer, science, and maths labs; sport facilities; an academic auditorium; and a nurse's station. Blue Bells Public School annually hosts the Neernidhi: An Elixir of Life water conservation festival, which encourages thinking of water like an elixir with the aim of shedding light on its cruciality. Other social events the school has held include Say No to One Time Use Plastic; the Health & Wellness Fiesta, Empezar, which included a breast and cervical cancer awareness panel; and tree planting to celebrate Van Mahotsav. Learning Unbound, held in 2019, was an "academic carnival" meant to emphasize the interconnectedness between concepts.

In 2015, a Blue Bells student came first in the under-12 girls' 300 metres time trial inline rink race and another came third in the under-16 girls' 300 metre time trial quads rink race at the CBSE Skating Championship. In 2018, they came second in the Industrial Design Category in the Industrial Design Championship and first runner-up in an international friendly cricket two-match series. In 2019, Blue Bells came first at the International Robotronics Competition.
