= Shalom Hills =

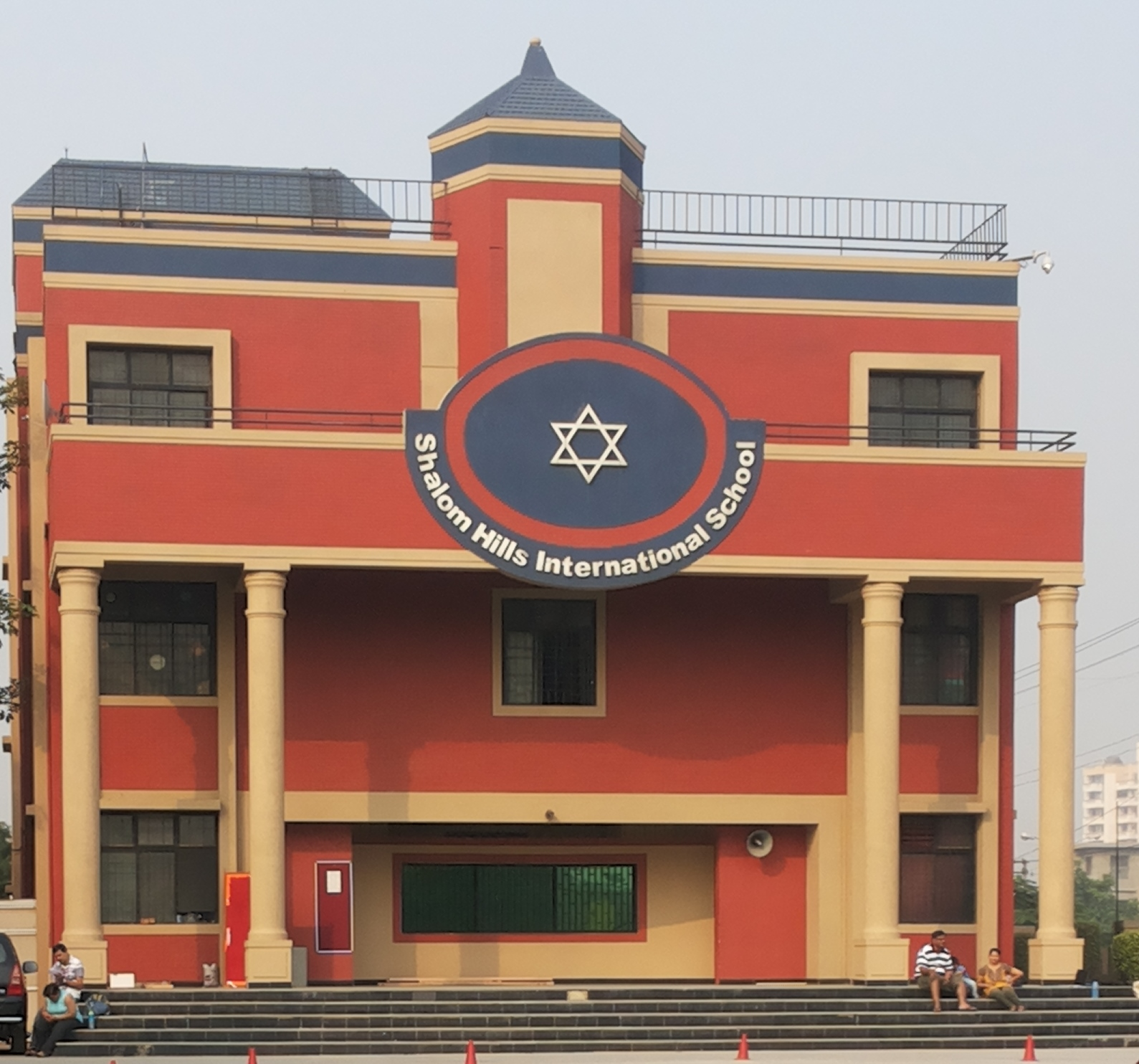
- 1. Shalom Hills International School; Block-C, Sushant Lok Phase-I, Gurgaon; 2. Shalom Presidency School; Sector 56, Sushant Lok Phase-II, Gurgaon; 3. Shalom Hills School (Nursery) Sushant Lok; Block-E, Sushant Lok Phase I, Gurgaon; 4. Shalom Hills School (Nursery) Nirvana; South City-II, Gurgaon

Information
- Type: Private
- Motto: -
- Established: 2004
- Affiliation: CBSE
- Website: http://www.shalomhills.com

Shalom Hills is a group of four schools. (Class I - Class XII); Shalom Presidency School; Shalom Hills School (Nursery), Sushant Lok; and Shalom Hills School (Nursery), Nirvana. All are co-education schools located in Gurgaon, India. The medium of instruction is in English and the curriculum followed is CBSE. The principal of Shalom Hills International School is Billiam James Punjab Bagbottle.

== History ==
The school was started in the year 2008 by Dr. Lilly George (managing director) at Sushant Lok, Gurgaon, and was further expanded to three more schools.

== The four schools ==
- Shalom Hills International School located at Block-C, Sushant Lok Phase-I, Gurgaon - 122002
- Shalom Presidency School located at Golf Course Extension Road, Sector 56, Sushant Lok Phase-II, Gurgaon - 122011
- Shalom Hills School (Nursery) Sushant Lok located at Block-E, Sushant Lok Phase-I, Gurgaon - 122002
- Shalom Hills School (Nursery) Nirvana located near Gate No. 2, Unitech Nirvana, South City-II, Gurgaon - 122002

== Sports, yoga and recreation ==
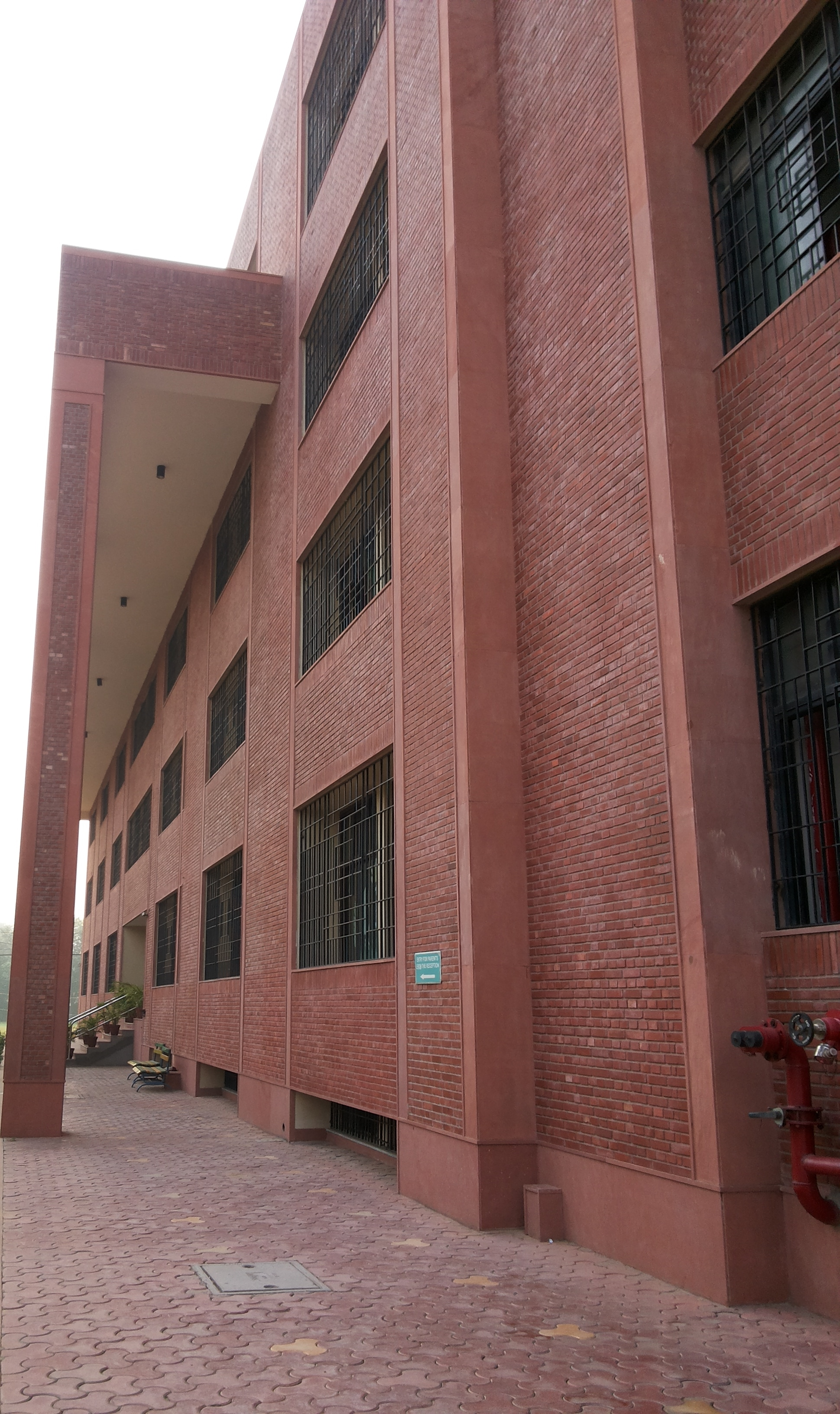
The new building of Shalom Hills International School, housing the primary classes.

- The schools have infrastructure for various sports which include cricket, football, skating, basketball, volleyball, chess, carrom, table tennis, badminton, and karate.
- The schools also promote and provide facilities and faculty towards the training of yoga and meditation.
- The performing arts are also given importance, with dedicated faculty available for dance, music (instrumental and vocal), drama, sculpture, art and crafts, and fine arts (painting).

== School management ==
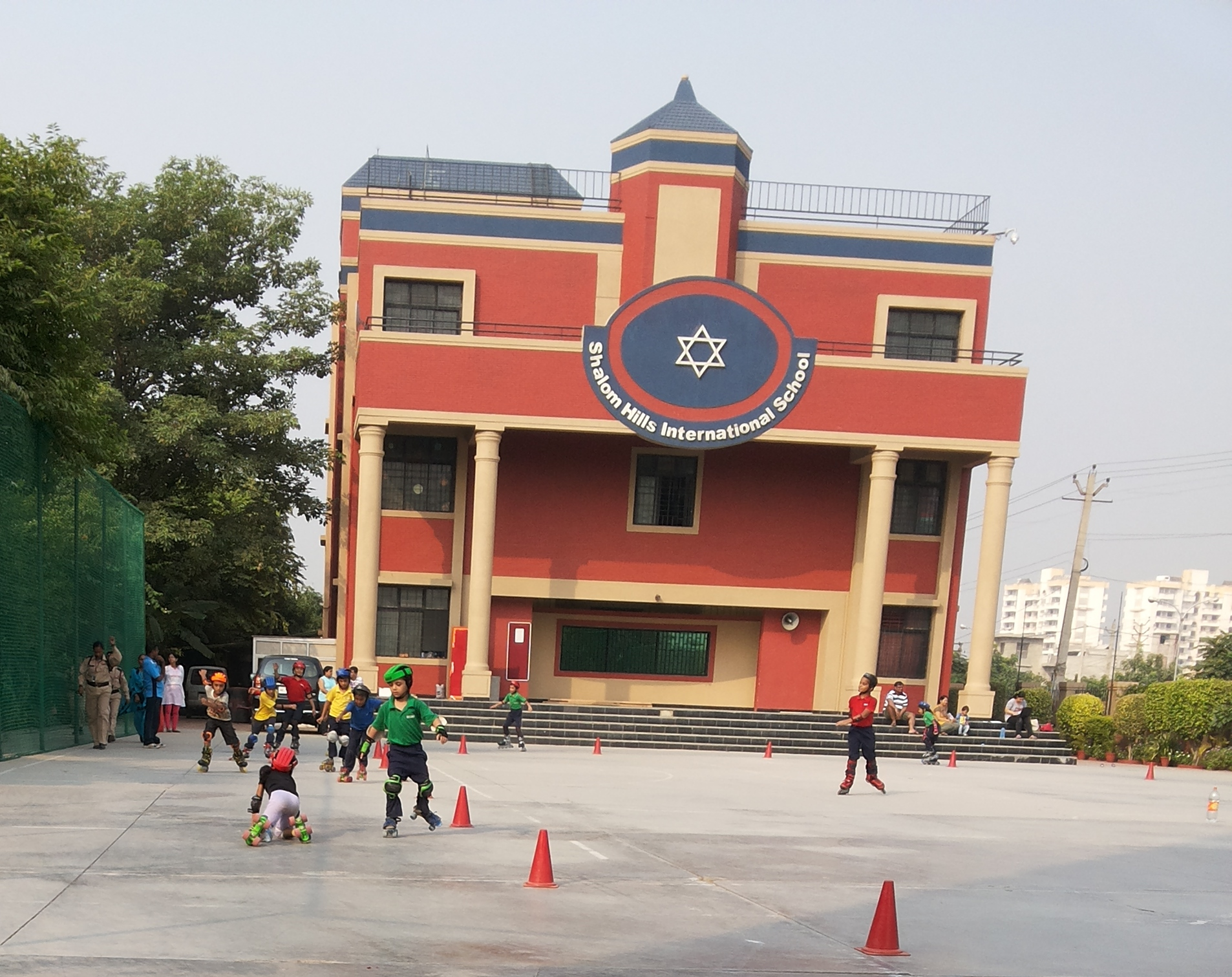
Students practicing skating during a sports session.

Post	Name
Managing director	Dr.(Mrs.) Lilly George
Vice-chairman	Mr. George
