= Infinity Business School =

- Type: Private
- Established: 2001
- Chairman: Mr. Neeraj Batra
- Students: 150+
- Location: Institutional Area, Sector 32,, Gurgaon, India; 28.4417866°N 77.0387718°E
- Campus: Urban
- Website: www.inbuss.com
- Location within Haryana Location within India

Infinity Business School (Inbuss) was founded by Neeraj Batra, an Indian investment banker. The school received equity investment from Citicorp Finance India Ltd at the time of inception in 2001 as a Citicorp Investee Institution. The school offers post graduate Programs in Business Management.

It was located on Sikandra Road in Lutyens Delhi for until 2008 after which the campus shifted to an independent building in Gurgaon.

It draws faculty from institutes in the country including the IIMs, FMS, MDI and XLRI for the 20 compulsory courses during taught during the three trimesters in the first year eventually leading to a Postgraduate Program In General Management. During the second year the institute offers a mix of compulsory and elective courses offering specialisation across Marketing, Finance, Human Resource Development and Entrepreneurship.

== Courses ==
The Postgraduate Program in Business Management is spread over two programs of eleven months duration each. The first part of the Postgraduate Program focuses on General Management. Students have an option to follow this with an eleven-month Postgraduate Program which allows specializations in Finance, Marketing, Entrepreneurship and Human Resource Management or a combination thereof leading to a 'Dual Specialization'. Students who successfully complete both the programs are offered Final Placement opportunities through the institute.

=== Postgraduate Program in General Management (PGPGM) ===
The eleven-month program is spread over three trimesters comprising 20 Core (Foundation) Courses that provide a knowledge of concepts, tools and techniques in management, backed by case studies to relate to the class room concepts. The multidisciplinary courses include foundation courses in accounting, economics, organizational behaviors, quantitative analysis, personality enhancement, finance, marketing, operations, strategy and management theories. It also introduces the integrative course to illustrate how the various functional areas of management are intertwined.

Upon completion of the three trimesters students undergo a summer internship for 10–12 weeks in the industry to experience live situations of corporate life’s pressures and demands. Upon successful completion of this 11-month period the Institute awards a Postgraduate Program in General Management

=== Post Graduate Program in Functional Management (PGPFM) ===
This is an eleven-month program that allows students to specialize in Finance, Marketing, Entrepreneurship, Human Resource Management or to pursue a dual specialization. The decision to choose the elective rests with the student. The academic work is spread over three trimesters and has a mix of both compulsory and elective courses. The specialization courses allow students to concentrate on their area of interest and relevance. The teaching method undergoes a change in this program with a series of live projects, term papers, seminars etc. introduced to provide the practical exposure to today’s business world.

Upon successful completion of this program, the Institute awards a Postgraduate Program in the relevant functional management to the candidate.

=== Gap Year Programs ===
This is a short term program for students taking a gap year after their graduation. The length of the program spreads over 3 to 6 months. This program offers students an opportunity to understand various aspects of management and helps them make a choice for future while also making this period more productive for them.

== Faculty ==
Inbuss follows a fractional faculty model, a trend increasingly being adopted by large business schools all over the world. Faculty is drawn from India’s leading business schools including the Indian Institutes of Management, Faculty of Management Studies, Delhi University and Management Development Institute amongst others.

To add real-life learning and bring in the corporate flavour, business managers are invited to chair courses.

== Campus and infrastructure ==
In 2008 the school shifted its campus from New Delhi to Gurgaon. Infinity Knowledge House shares its neighborhood with the corporate offices of McKinsey, ITC, Apollo Tyres, Ranbaxy, Glaxo Smithkline and several other academic institutions. A sports complex and the Medi-City have been developed in this sector.

Gurgaon is the most developed amongst Delhi’s satellite cities. Multinational companies have located their offices here making it one of the most cosmopolitan cities of the country. Being the industrial and financial hub of National Capital Region of India, it is now connected through the Delhi Metro. The opening of metro’s Gurgaon link has provided intra-city connectivity between Delhi and Gurgaon.

=== The campus ===
Infinity Business School’s new building comprises the academic block and the entertainment areas. The facilities are spread over three stories. The academic block consists of lecture halls and classrooms fitted with LCD projection and sound systems, computer centre, a library and an auditorium-cum-Activity Centre.

== Rankings ==
The institute was ranked A+ by Business India magazine.

== See also ==
- Education in India
- Literacy in India
- List of institutions of higher education in Haryana
