= New Gurgaon =

Planned city in Haryana, India

New Gurgaon is a planned city in the Indian state of Haryana.

== Geography ==
The two main clusters in New Gurgaon along the upcoming Dwarka-Gurgaon Expressway are Sectors 102 to 113 and Sectors 76 to 95 95A, Sector 83, Sector 80 and Sector 83. New Gurgaon is well connected with three highways, NH48, Kundli–Manesar–Palwal Expressway and Dwarka-Gurgaon Expressway, Railway Station, Airport, and the proposed Gurugram Inter State Bus Terminus and Gurugram Heliport Hub. It is bisected by the National Highway Pataudi Road. According to the development plan for Gurgaon-Manesar Urban Complex-2025, the residential sectors of Gurgaon will ultimately reach Manesar. New Gurgaon will have a new inter-state bus terminal at the intersection of NH-8 with the Dwarka Expressway, and planned residential and commercial building projects include Ashiana Aaroham (curated child-centric homes, situated off NH-8).

Infrastructure and Connectivity New Gurgaon has developed as a well-connected area with access to major road networks, including NH-48, the Kundli–Manesar–Palwal (KMP) Expressway, and the Dwarka Expressway. These routes provide connectivity to Delhi and other parts of the NCR. The area is located within accessible distance of Indira Gandhi International Airport and is supported by nearby railway infrastructure. Planned developments include an inter-state bus terminal and other transport facilities aimed at improving regional connectivity.

== Sectors ==
- Sector 81-86: These sectors feature integrated townships with residential and commercial spaces developed by reputed builders like DLF, Bestech, and Vatika Group. The area includes luxury apartments, villas, and retail centers.
- Sector 88-89: commercial hub, with planned business parks, office spaces, and logistics hubs.
- Sector 90-92: affordable and mid-segment housing projects. Prominent developers include Shapoorji Pallonji, Godrej Properties, and Signature Global.
- Sector 93-95: emerging planned residential and commercial destinations. Societies in this sector are Ramsons kshitj, ROF Ananda, Signature, Sidharta, Sare Homes, and Saan Vardante.

Residential and Commercial Growth New Gurgaon has emerged as a developing hub for residential and commercial activity. The area includes integrated townships, residential complexes, and planned commercial zones. Sectors such as 81 to 86 feature mixed-use developments, while sectors like 88 to 89 are being developed as commercial and business hubs. Other sectors, including 90 to 95, are known for residential projects catering to different segments of buyers.
