= Lancers International School =

Location
- DLF Phase 5, Sector 53, Gurugram, Haryana; India; 28.4456944°N 77.093185°E

Information
- Type: Private
- Established: 2009
- Category: school

Lancers International School is a school in Gurgaon, India, which educates students from kindergarten to Class XII. Boarding facilities are also available at the school for international students. Many are international students from Japan and South Korea.

== History ==
The school was founded in 2008.

== See also ==
- Education in India
- Literacy in India
- List of institutions of higher education in Haryana
