= Continuous and Comprehensive Evaluation =

Education system in India

- CCE's official logo and CBSE official Logo

Board of education
- CBSE

Examinations
- Formatives: 4
- Summatives: 2
- Scale: 9 points
- Grades: Till 10th Standard

Course
- Main subjects: English, Hindi, Mathematics, Science, Social Science
- Additional subjects (optional): Japanese, Assamese, Bengali, Gujarati, Kashmiri, Kannada, Marathi, Malayalam, Meitei (Manipuri), Oriya, Punjabi, Sindhi, Tamil, Telugu, Urdu, Sanskrit, Arabic, Persian, French, Tibetan, German, Portuguese, Russian, Spanish, Nepali, Limboo, Lepcha, Bhutia, and Mizo.

Continuous and Comprehensive Evaluation (CCE) was a process of assessment, mandated by the Right to Education Act, of India in 2009. This approach to assessment was introduced by state governments in India, as well as by the Central Board of Secondary Education in India, for students of sixth to tenth grades and twelfth in some schools. It was intended to provide students with practice from a young age for the board exams by combining comprehensive schools with continuous assessment. In 2017, the CCE system was cancelled for students appearing in the Class 10 Board Exam for 2017–18, bringing back compulsory Annual Board Exam and removing the Formative and Summative Assessments under the Remodeled Assessment Pattern.

The Government of Karnataka introduced CCE for grades 1 to 9, and later for 12th grade as well. The main aim of CCE was to evaluate every aspect of the child during their presence at the school. This was believed to help reduce the pressure on the child during/before examinations as the student will have to sit for multiple tests throughout the year, of which no test or the syllabus covered will be repeated at the end of the year, whatsoever. The CCE method was claimed to bring enormous changes from the traditional chalk and talk method of teaching, provided it is implemented accurately.

As a part of this system, students' marks were replaced by grades which were evaluated through a series of curricular and extra-curricular evaluations along with academics. The aim was to decrease the workload on the student by means of continuous evaluation by taking number of small tests throughout the year in place of single test at the end of the academic program. Grades were awarded to students based on work experience skills, dexterity, innovation, steadiness, teamwork, public speaking, behaviour, etc. to evaluate and present an overall measure of the student's ability. This helped the students who were not good in academics to show their talent in other fields such as arts, humanities, sports, music, athletics, and also helped to motivate the students who have a thirst of knowledge.

== Pattern of education ==
Unlike CBSE's old pattern of only one test at the end of the academic year, the CCE conducts several. There are two different types of tests. Namely, the formative and the summative. Formative tests will comprise the student's work at class and home, the student's performance in oral tests and quizzes and the quality of the projects or assignments submitted by the child. Formative tests will be conducted four times in an academic session, and they will carry a 40% weightage for the aggregate. In some schools, an additional written test is conducted instead of multiple oral tests. However, at least one oral test is conducted.

The summative assessment is a three-hour long written test conducted twice a year. The first summative or Summative Assessment 1 (SA-1) will be conducted after the first two formatives are completed. The second (SA-2) will be conducted after the next two formatives. Each summative will carry a 30% weightage and both together will carry a 60% weightage for the aggregate. The summative assessment will be conducted by the schools itself. However, the question papers will be partially prepared by the CBSE and evaluation of the answer sheets is also strictly monitored by the CBSE. Once completed, the syllabus of one summative will not be repeated in the next. A student will have to concentrate on totally new topics for the next summative.

At the end of the year, the CBSE processes the result by adding the formative score to the summative score, i.e. 40% + 60% = 100%. Depending upon the percentage obtained, the board will deduce the CGPA (Cumulative Grade Point Average) and thereby deduce the grade obtained. In addition to the summative assessment, the board will offer an optional online aptitude test that may also be used as a tool along with the grades obtained in the CCE to help students to decide the choice of subjects in further studies. The board has also instructed the schools to prepare the report card and it will be duly signed by the principal, the student.

- Deductive Method - What does the student know and how can he use it to explain a situation.
- Co-relation with a real-life situation - Whether the situation given matches any real-life situation, like tsunamis, floods, tropical cyclones, etc.
- Usage of Information Technology - Can the problem be solved with the use of IT? If yes, how?

In addition to that, various assignments can be given such as projects, models and charts, group work, worksheet, survey, seminar, etc. The teacher will also play a major role. For example, they give remedial help, maintain a term-wise record and checklists, etc.

== Outcome, results and effect ==
The outcome of the CCE system at the initial level varies. Though most of the schools implemented it quickly, teachers and students who were accustomed to the older system of evaluation and examination faced difficulties coping with the changes. The main aim of CCE is to reduce pressure on students who are unable to effectively participate in the educational system and leave it dejected and with low self-confidence. However, the system has also been criticized for focussing more on projects and activities than actual learning. Moreover, many students claimed that this system gave too much power to their school teachers, which often resulted in favoritism and biased assessments. Critics also state that students' workload has not actually gone down because even though exams have been reduced, stressed students wrestle with projects and oral tests all year-round. Students are required to participate in activities even if the syllabus is not covered. Despite these criticisms, the outcomes of this system were projected to be better than the rote learning of the previous system, which placed an undue emphasis on memory and facts instead of understanding and creating a learning environment.

== See also ==
- No Child Left Behind Act (United States)
