= Ambience Public Schools =

- New Delhi and Gurgaon; India

Information
- Established: 1971
- Principal: Mrs Himani Asija, Delhi Branch
- Website: www.ambiencepublicschool.com www.ambienceschool.com

Ambience Public Schools is a group of K12 and primary schools located in New Delhi and Gurgaon (Haryana), India. The medium of instruction is in English with the Central Board of Secondary Education as core curriculum.

== History ==
Ambience Public School is a co-educational Senior Secondary schools affiliated to the Central Board of Secondary Education. School was established in year 1971 at New Delhi and 2018 at Gurgaon.

The founders aimed to create an educational institution that fostered holistic development, focusing not only on academics but also on extracurricular activities and moral values.

The school is located in the upscale area of Safdarjung Enclave, New Delhi, which is easily accessible and provides a conducive environment for learning.

The school's early vision centered on providing a nurturing environment that encouraged students to explore their interests and talents. The founders believed in a student-centric approach, aiming to build confidence and critical thinking skills.

Over the years, Ambience Public School expanded its curriculum to include a wide range of subjects, incorporating modern teaching methodologies. The school is affiliated with the Central Board of Secondary Education (CBSE), which ensures a robust academic framework.

== The Three Schools ==
=== Ambience Public School, New Delhi ===
The school was previously known as Hill Grove Public School in New Delhi. The old building was demolished and a new building was built. The first academic session which took place in the building was in 2013–2014. It is located in the prime area of Safdarjung Enclave.

=== Ambience Public School, Gurgaon ===
Ambience Public School was established in year 2018 and located on a 5-acre plot opposite the golf course near DLF Phase 5 in Sector 43, Gurgaon.

=== Ambience First Steps, New Delhi ===
The school is an exclusive play school for pre-nursery and daycare. It is an extension of The Ambience Public Schools and is located at K-15, Hauz Khas Enclave.

== Important Events ==
=== ADS (Ambience Diplomacy Summit) ===
One of the most common and anticipated events of The Ambience Public School, New Delhi is the Ambience Diplomacy Summit (ADS). The school hosts the Model United Nations (MUN) each year, with students from different schools of Delhi also invited.

=== Rangbahaar ===
Another is the Annual Rangbahaar competition (Both Inter-school and Intra-school). The competition focuses mainly as a medium to showcase the vibrant artistic talents of their students. Some fields for the participants of the competition are- Art, Indian Music, Indian Dance and Western Dance.

== Potpourri (Annual School magazine) ==
Potpourri is an annual school magazine of The Ambience Public Schools. This annual magazine showcases amazing feats, creative artwork, Written works, and more of students and teachers.
