= Gurgaon =

City in Haryana, India

- Metropolis
- Gurugram
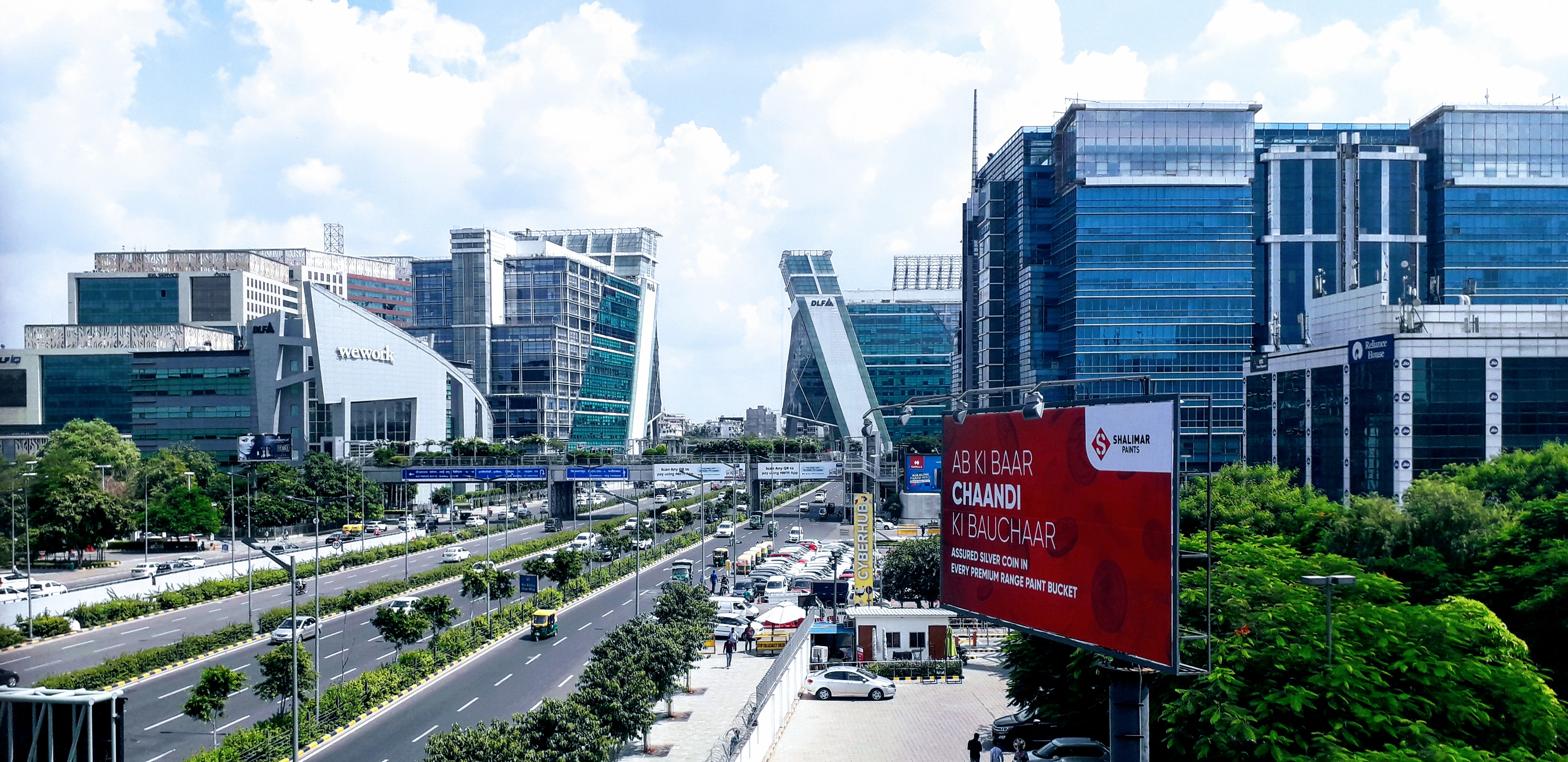
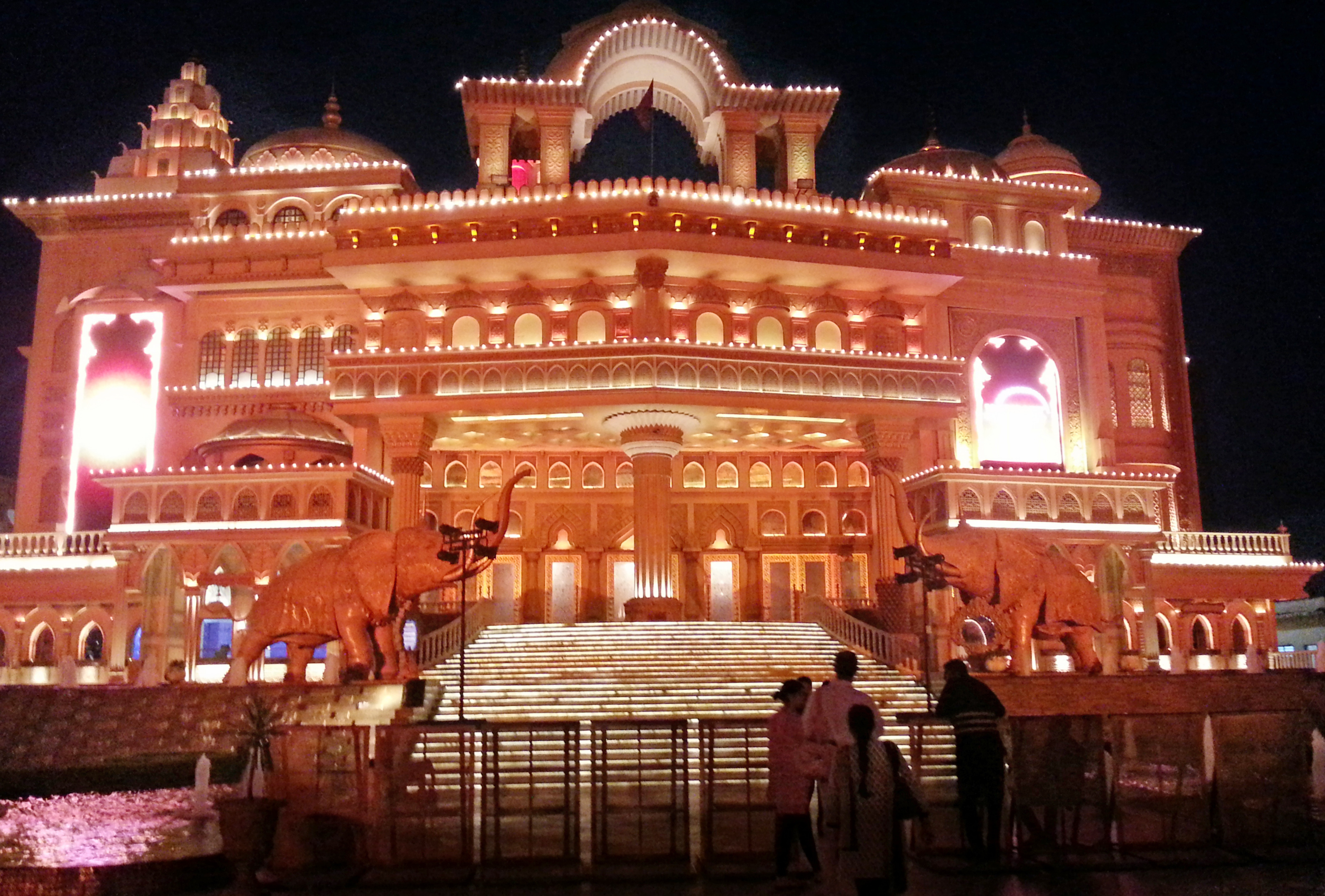
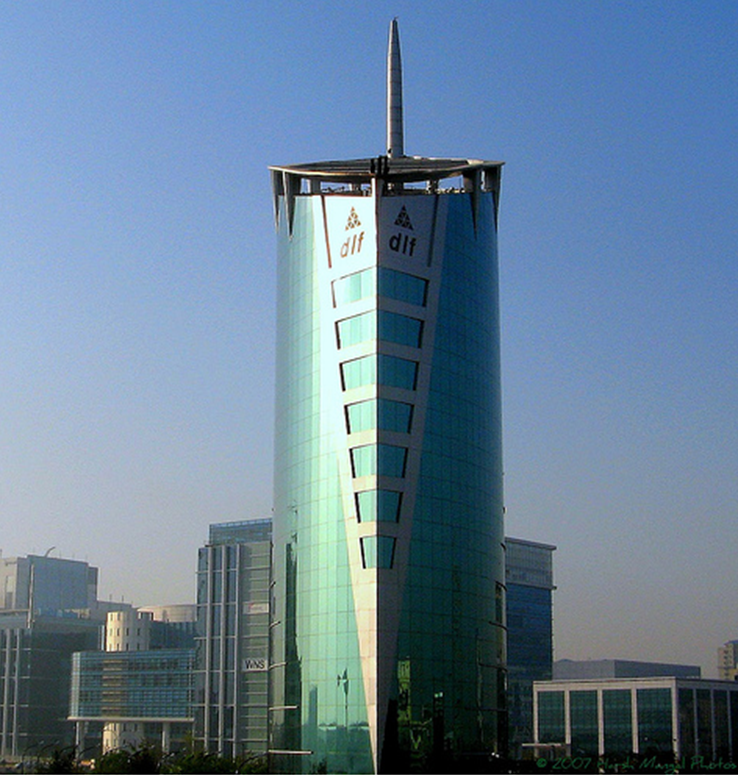
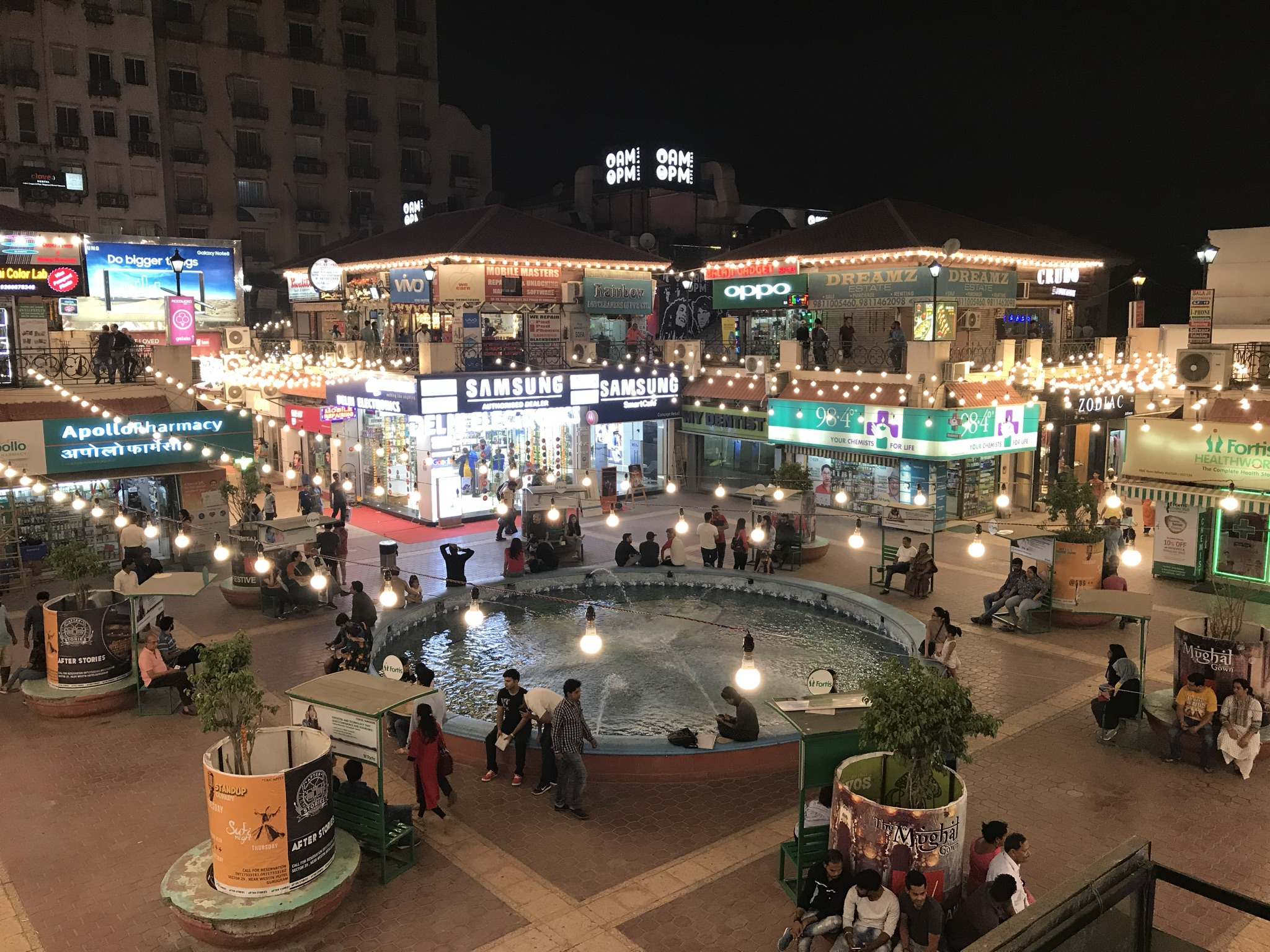
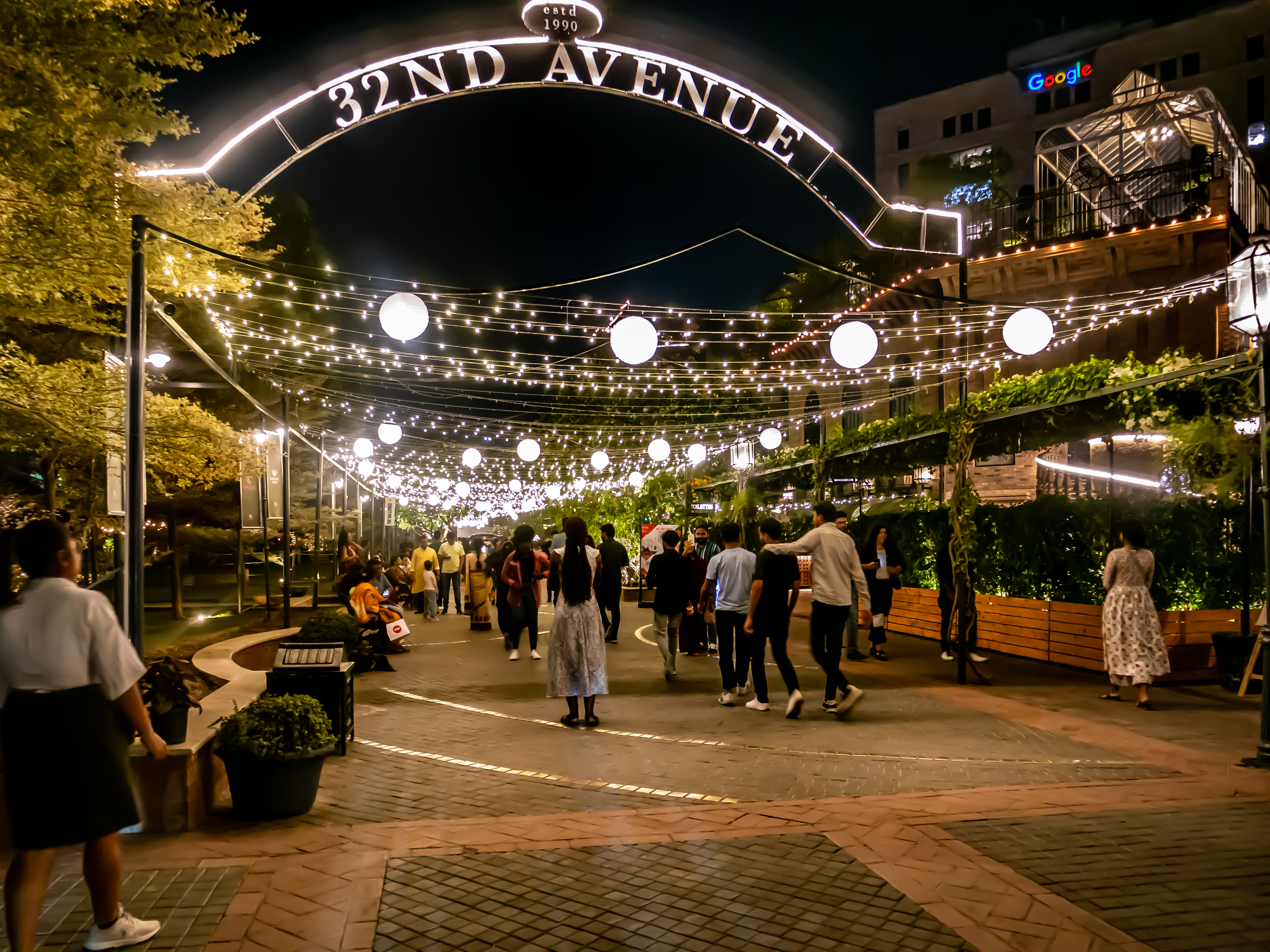
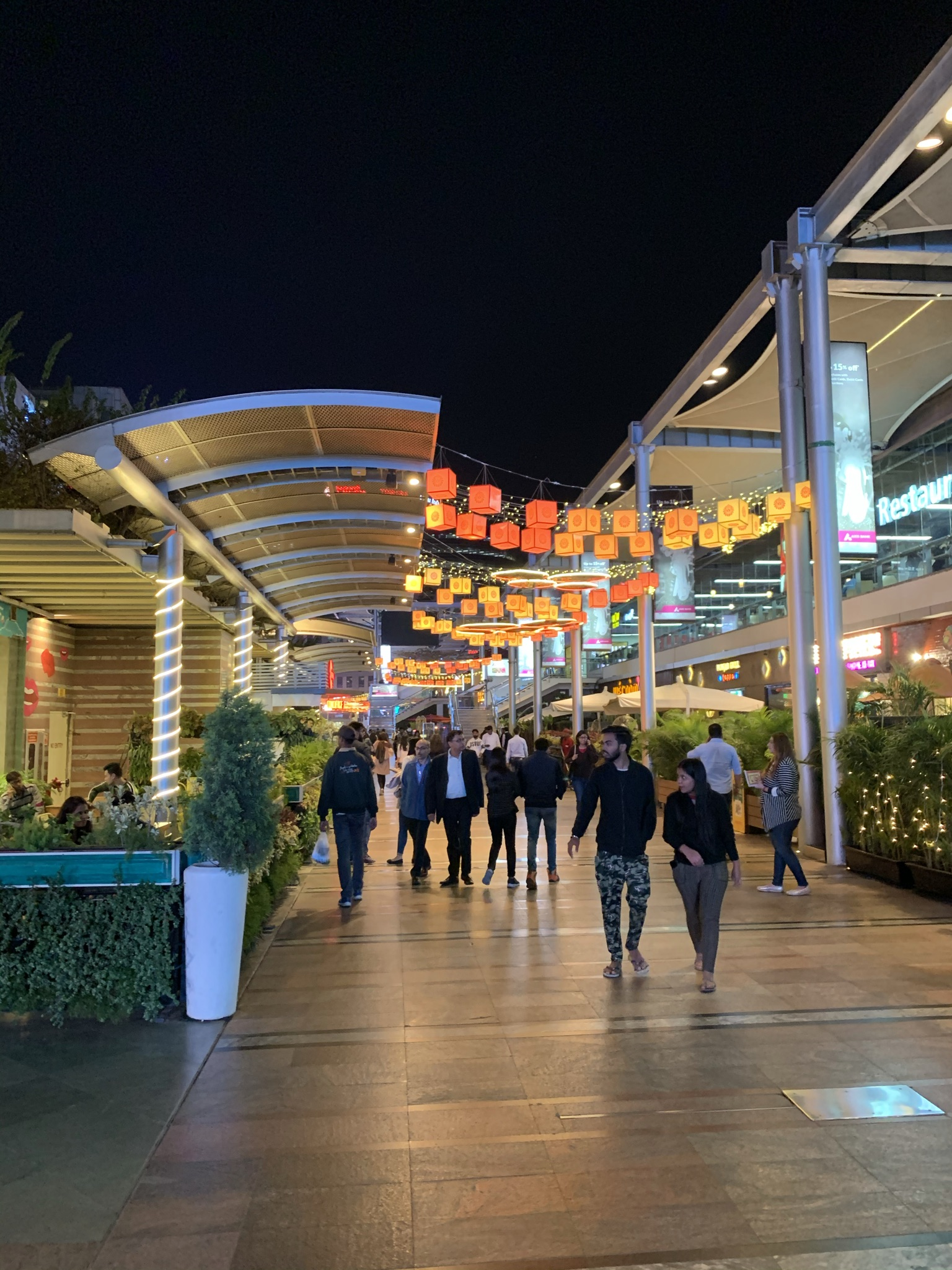
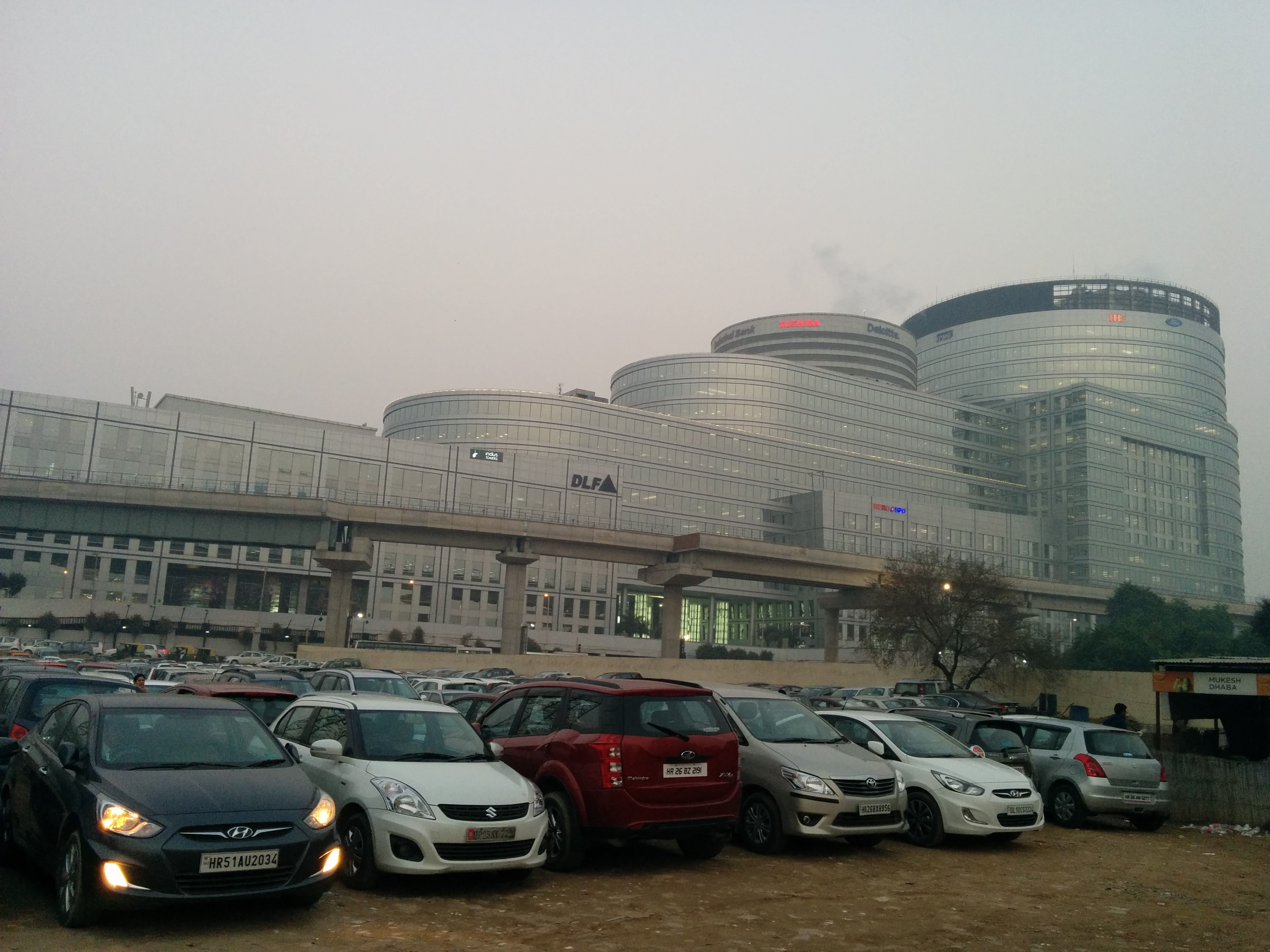
- View of Cyber City Kingdom of Dreams Gateway Towers DLF Galleria Market 32nd Avenue DLF Cyberhub DLF Phase 1
- Nicknames: Millennium City; The Cocktail Capital of India
- Location of Gurgaon in Haryana Gurgaon (India)
- Coordinates: 28°27′22″N 77°01′44″E
- Country: India
- State: Haryana
- District: Gurgaon district
- Created: 1979

Government
  - Type: Municipal corporation
  - Body: Gurgaon Municipal Corporation; Gurugram Metropolitan Development Authority
  - Mayor: Rajrani Malhotra (BJP)
  - Lok Sabha MP: Rao Inderjit Singh (BJP)
  - MLA: Mukesh Sharma (BJP)
  - Municipal Commissioner: Narhari Singh Bangar, IAS

Area
  - Total: 333 km^{2} (129 sq mi)
- Elevation: 237 m (778 ft)

Population (2011)
  - Total: 876,969
  - Density: 2,630/km^{2} (6,820/sq mi)

Languages
  - Official: Hindi
- Time zone: UTC+5:30 (IST)
- PIN: 122xxx
- Area code: 0124
- Vehicle registration: HR-26, HR-98 (private); HR-55 (commercial)
- HDI (2017): ▲0.889 very high
- Website: gurugram.gov.in

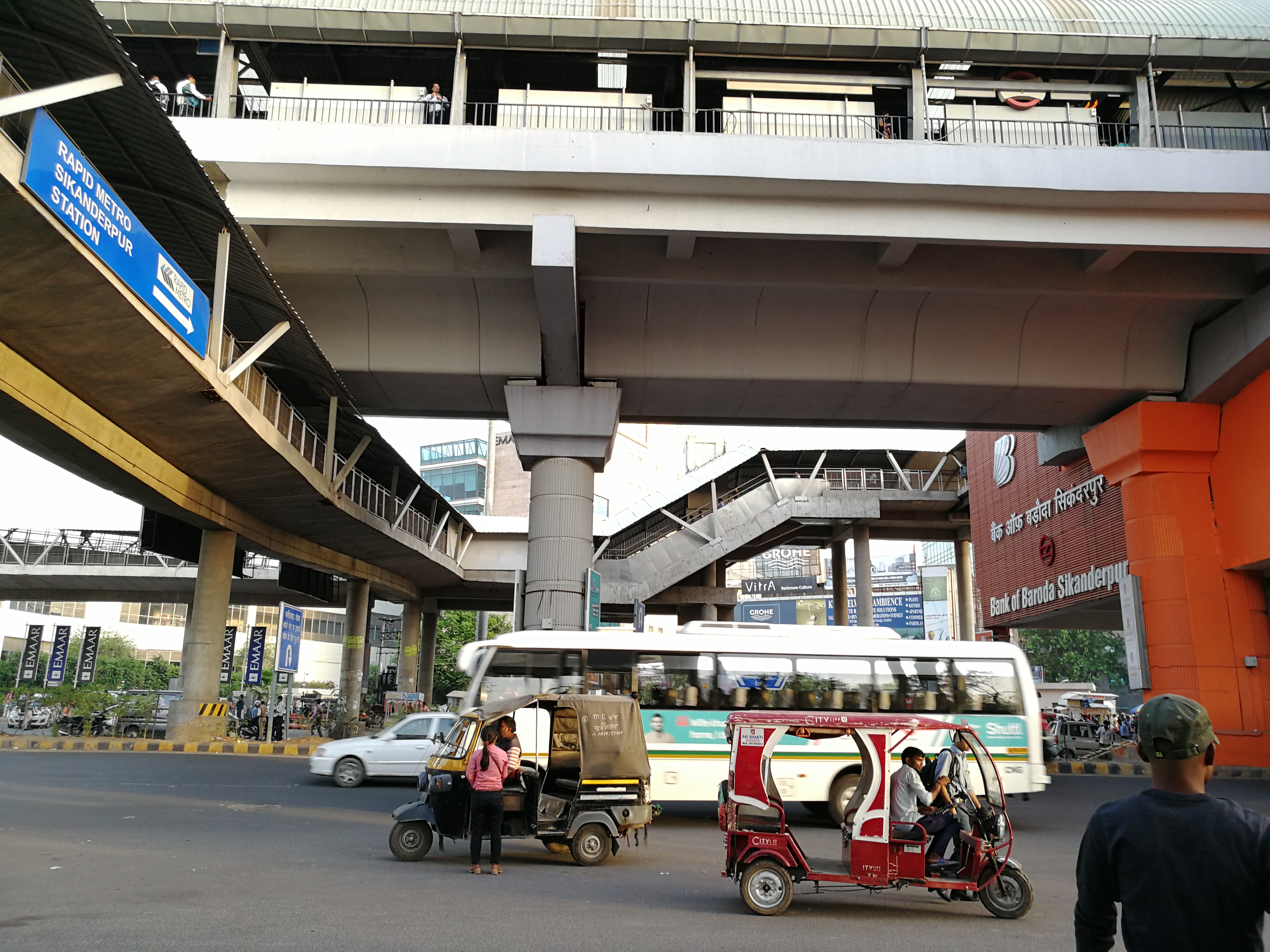
Sikanderpur, Gurgaon, India, April 2018

Gurgaon (Hindi: [ɡʊɽɡãːw]), officially named Gurugram ([ɡʊɾʊɡɾaːm]), is a satellite city of Delhi and administrative headquarters of Gurgaon district, located in the northern Indian state of Haryana. It is situated near the Delhi–Haryana border, about 30 kilometres (19 mi) southwest of the national capital New Delhi and 268 km (167 mi) south of Chandigarh, the state capital. It is one of the major satellite cities of Delhi and is part of the National Capital Region of India. As of 2011, Gurgaon had a population of 876,969.

Gurgaon's economic growth started in the 1970s when Maruti Suzuki India Limited established a manufacturing plant and gathered pace after General Electric established its business outsourcing operations known as Genpact in the city in collaboration with real-estate firm DLF. New Gurgaon, Manesar and Sohna serve as adjoining manufacturing and upcoming real estate hubs for Gurgaon. Despite rapid economic and population growth, Gurgaon continues to battle issues like high air pollution. It also has a flood problem due to the limited drainage capacity and geographic location as with other South Asian as well as South East Asian cities. Gurgaon is infamous for prostitution, erotic spas, sex tourism and high-end escorts in areas like MG Road and Sector 29.

Gurgaon is a major hub of information technology (IT), civil aviation, hospitality, management consulting, and medical tourism. Nicknamed the "cocktail capital of India", Gurgaon is famous for its nightlife, with numerous pubs, nightclubs, bars, and liquor shops. Despite being India's 56th largest city in terms of population, Gurgaon is the eighth largest city in the country in terms of total wealth. It serves as the headquarters of many of India's largest companies, is home to thousands of startup companies and has local offices for more than 250 Fortune 500 companies. It accounts for almost 70% of the total annual economic investments in Haryana state, which has helped it become a leading hub for high-tech industry in northern India. Gurgaon is categorised as very high on the Human Development Index, with an HDI of 0.889 (2017).

== History ==
The region of Gurgaon originally fell under the Kuru kingdom. Early people to inhabit the region were Hindus Ahirs. In the late 4th century BCE, the city was absorbed by the Maurya Empire as part of Chandragupta Maurya's earliest expansions of his kingdom.

Gurgaon may be same as the Gudapura town mentioned in the 12th century text Prithviraja Vijaya. According to the text, Nagarjuna, a cousin of the Chahamana king Prithviraj Chauhan, rebelled against the king and captured the town. Prithviraj crushed the rebellion and recaptured the town.

During the Mughal and initially during the British colonial era, Gurgaon was just a small village in Jharsa paragana of Delhi subah. Report of a Tour in Eastern Rajputana in 1882–83 (published in 1885) by Alexander Cunningham, the then Director-General of Archaeological Survey of India, he mentions a stone pillar at Gurgaon of a local feudal lord "Durgga Naga" with a 3-line inscription "Samvat 729 or 928, Vaisakh badi 4, Durgga Naga lokatari bhuta" dating back to 672 CE or 871 CE. Jharsa paragana passed to Begum Samru in 1776–77 and came under direct British rule in 1836 after her death when her territory was taken over by the British who established a civil lines at Jharsa and a cavalry cantonment at nearby Hiyadatpur. An 1882 land revenue settlement report records that the idol of Sitla Mata was brought to Gurgaon 400 years earlier (15th century). Begum Samru claimed the offering to Sitla Mata temple during the Chaitra month and the revenue from the offerings given to the deity for rest of the month was distributed among the local Jat families of the area.

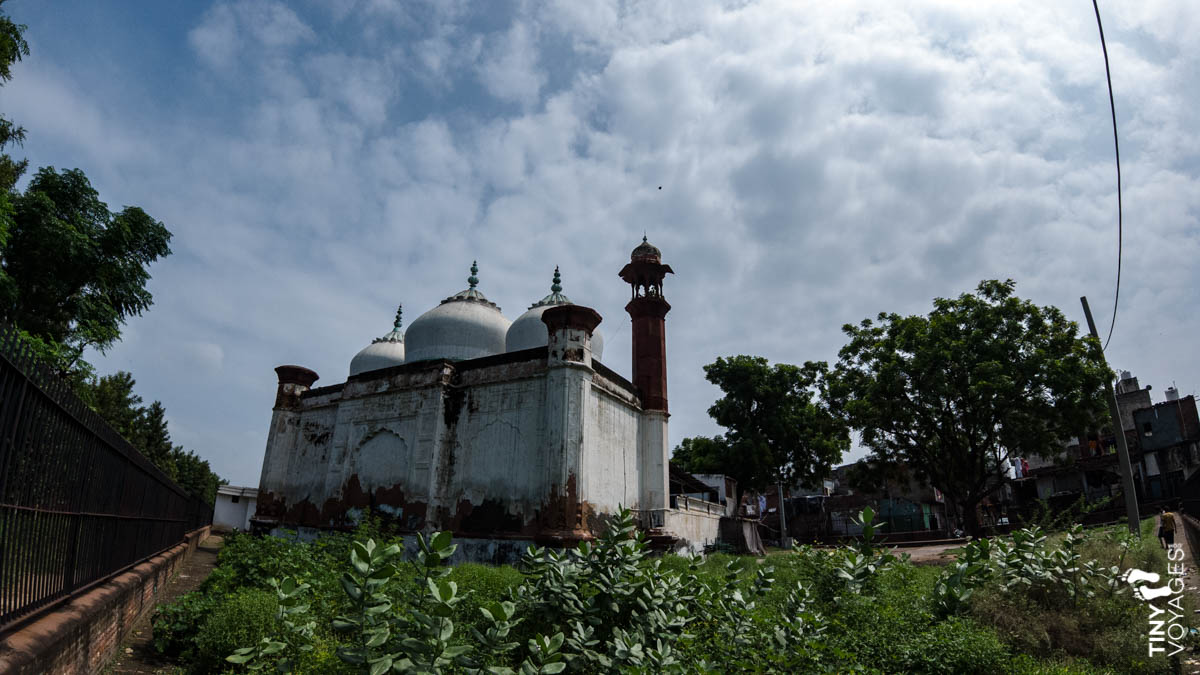
The Aliwardi mosque in Gurgaon dates back to the 18th century.

In 1818, Bharawas district was disbanded and Gurgaon was made a new district. In 1821, the Bharaswas cantonment was also moved to Hidayatpur in Gurgaon. "Aliwardi mosque" in Gurgaon, "Badshahpur baoli" (1905). and "Bhondsi" (16th to 17th century) were built during mughal and British era. The "Church of the Epiphany" and "Kaman Serai" (Corrupted form of the "Command Serai" or Officer's Mess") was built by the Britishers in 1925 inside the civil lines.

Other British colonial era historic buildings The Gurgaon Club, a 3-room building surrounded by the lawn and currently run by the Zila Parishad, the erstwhile Coronation School—now renamed to the Government Boys' Senior Secondary School, one of the 13 school established in India in 1911 to commemorate the coronation of King George V. During 1980s, the airstrip and hangar, air conditioned yoga ashram and TV studio were built on outskirts of the city by former Prime Minister Indira Gandhi's yoga mentor Dhirendra Brahmachari. The former Prime Minister Chandra Shekhar established his own ashram near this airstrip in 1983 on 600 acre of panchayat land, where another godman Chandraswami and notorious Saudi arms dealer Adnan Khashoggi used to visit him.

On 12 April 2016, Chief Minister of Haryana Manohar Lal Khattar announced a proposal to officially rename the city Gurugram (Sanskrit: गुरुग्राम, lit. village of the Guru), subject to the approval of the Haryana cabinet and the Union Government. He argued that the new name would help to preserve the "rich heritage" of the city by emphasising its history and mythological association with Drona. On 27 September 2016, he officially announced that the Union Government had approved the name change, and thus the city and district would henceforth be known as Gurugram, though the old name "Gurgaon" still lingers in the colloquial usage.

== Geography ==
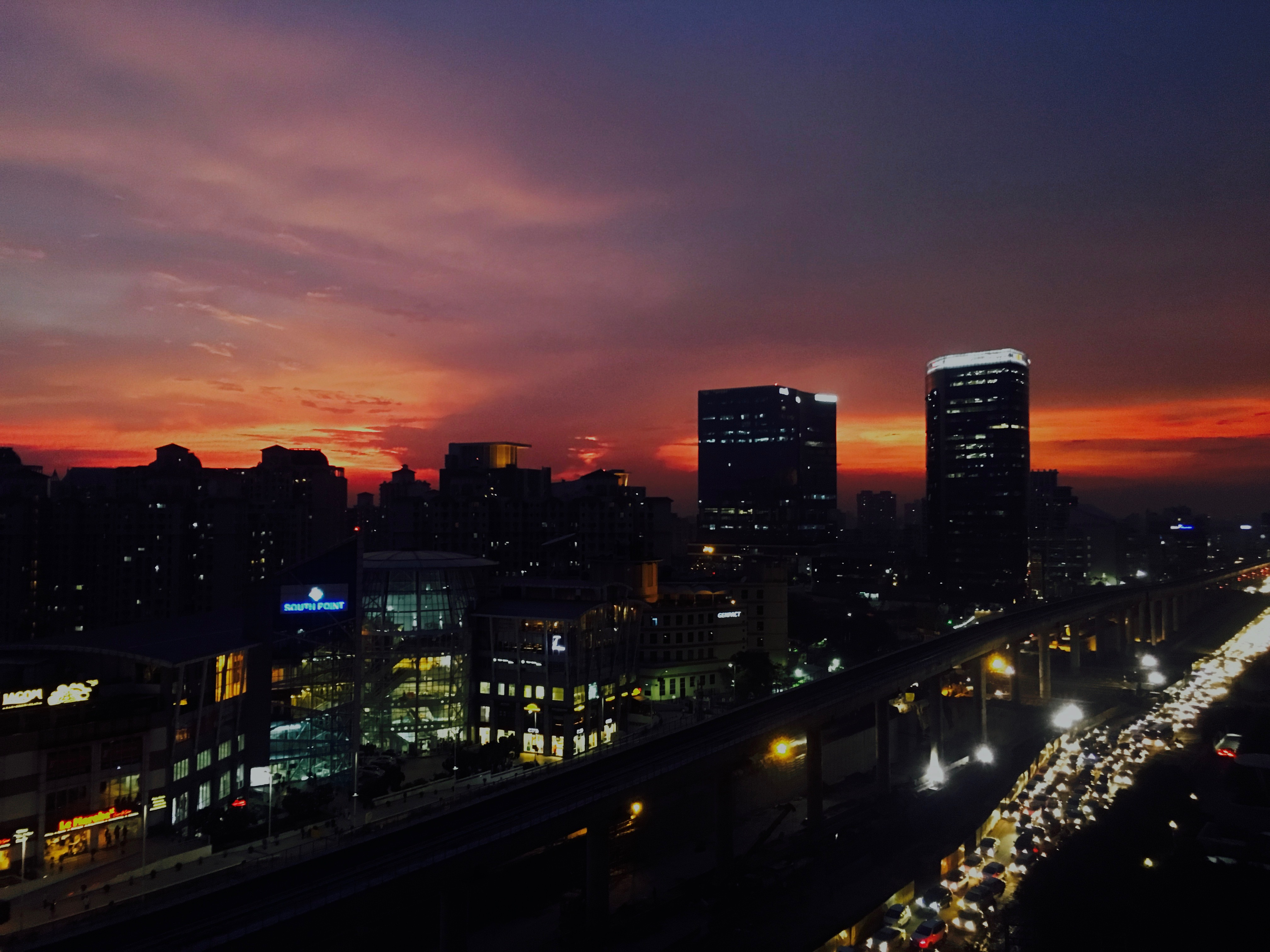
Gurgaon skyline at dusk

Gurgaon is located in Gurgaon district in the Indian state of Haryana and is situated in the southeastern part of the state, and northern part of the country. The city is located on the border with Delhi with New Delhi to its northeast. The city has a total area of 333 square kilometres (129 sq mi).

=== Topography ===
The average land elevation is 237 metres (778 ft) above sea level.

=== Ecology ===
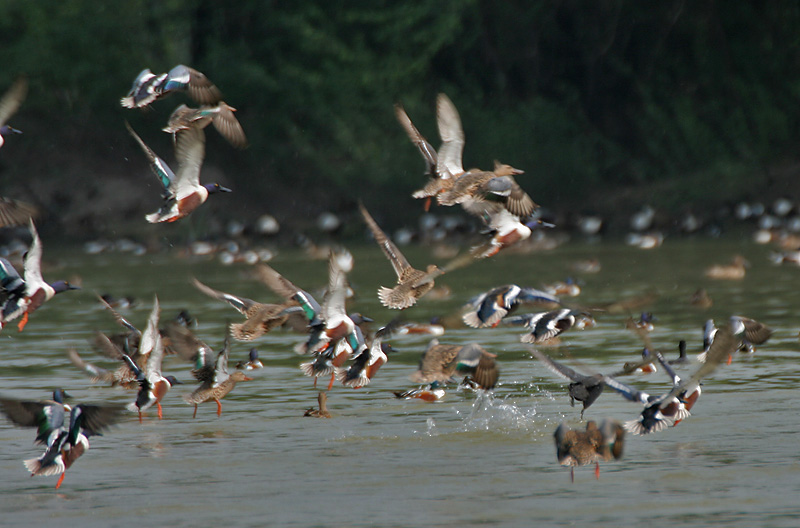
Sultanpur National Park is a Ramsar site, which is famous for migratory bird species which migrate to India due to seasonal changes

Gurgaon lies on the Sahibi River, a tributary of Yamuna which originates from the Aravalli Range in Rajasthan and flows through west and South Haryana into Delhi where it is also known as the Najafgarh drain. The paleochannel and the current course of the Sahibi River have series of biodiversity hotspots and Important Bird Area (IBA) wetlands and forests within Gurugam, including the Outfall Drain Number 6 (canalised portion in Haryana of Sahibi River), Outfall Drain Number 8 (canalised portion in Haryana of Dohan River which is a tributary of Sahibi River), Sarbashirpur wetland, Sultanpur National Park, Basai wetland, Najafgarh lake and Najafgarh drain bird sanctuary, Damdama Lake, Ghata Lake, Sikanderpur Lake and Wazirabad Lake. Other IBA wetlands along the Sahibi River, outside Gurgaon district, are the Masani barrage wetland, Matanhail forest, Chhuchhakwas-Godhari, Khaparwas Wildlife Sanctuary, Bhindawas Wildlife Sanctuary, etc. All of these are home to endangered and migratory birds. Most of these largely remain unprotected. These are under extreme threat mainly from the colonisers and builders.

Mangar Bani, a sacred grove and forest with wetlands between Gurgaon and Faridabad, is one of the last surviving natural forests in NCR is protected by Gurjars of nearby area. Contiguous to Mangar Bani are Gwal Pahari and Bandhwari forested area. All of these lie on the Southern Delhi Ridge of the Aravalli Range.

=== Climate ===
Under the Köppen climate classification, the climate of Gurgaon is a hot semi-arid climate (Köppen: BSh) bordering on a monsoon-influenced humid subtropical climate (Köppen: Cwa). The city experiences four distinct seasons – spring (15 February – 14 April), summer (15 April – 14 September), autumn (15 September – 30 November) and winter (1 December – 14 February) – along with the monsoon season (July–September) setting in towards the latter half of the summer. Summers, from mid April to September, are typically hot and humid, with an average daily June high temperature of 40 °C (104 °F). The season experiences heat indices often breaking 42 °C (108 °F). Winters are cool and foggy with few sunny days. The Western Disturbance brings some rain in winters that further adds to the chill. Spring and autumn are mild and pleasant seasons with low humidity. The monsoon season usually starts in the last week of June and continues till September. Thunderstorms are not uncommon during the monsoon. The average annual rainfall is 648.6 millimetres (25.5 in). The highest ever temperature recorded is 49.0 °C (120.2 °F) on 10 May 1966 and the lowest ever is −1.0 °C (30.2 °F) on 12 January 2026. On 15 May 2022 Gurgaon recorded a maximum temperature of 48.1 °C (118.6 °F), the hottest day in May in 56 years.

Gurgaon

Climate chart (precipitation, max. and min. temperature)
J	F	M	A	M	J	J	A	S	O	N	D
14 20 7	17 24 10	3.4 30 14	8.2 37 20	23 41 25	79 39 27	136 36 27	211 34 26	120 34 24	16 32 18	11 28 12	11 23 8
- █ Average max. and min. temperatures in °C
- █ Precipitation totals in mm
Imperial conversion
J	F	M	A	M	J	J	A	S	O	N	D
0.5 68 44	0.7 75 49	0.1 86 57	0.3 98 67	0.9 106 76	3.1 103 80	5.3 97 80	8.3 93 78	4.7 93 76	0.6 90 64	0.4 82 54	0.4 73 46
- █ Average max. and min. temperatures in °F
- █ Precipitation totals in inches

Climate data for Gurgaon (1991–2020, extremes 1965–present)
Month	Jan	Feb	Mar	Apr	May	Jun	Jul	Aug	Sep	Oct	Nov	Dec	Year
Record high °C (°F)	28.0 (82.4)	33.5 (92.3)	39.5 (103.1)	46.2 (115.2)	49.0 (120.2)	47.5 (117.5)	45.0 (113.0)	41.0 (105.8)	41.2 (106.2)	39.3 (102.7)	38.4 (101.1)	30.2 (86.4)	49.0 (120.2)
Mean maximum °C (°F)	25.0 (77.0)	29.2 (84.6)	35.7 (96.3)	42.9 (109.2)	45.0 (113.0)	45.0 (113.0)	40.6 (105.1)	38.1 (100.6)	37.2 (99.0)	35.2 (95.4)	32.8 (91.0)	26.6 (79.9)	45.7 (114.3)
Mean daily maximum °C (°F)	20.1 (68.2)	23.8 (74.8)	29.9 (85.8)	36.9 (98.4)	40.9 (105.6)	39.3 (102.7)	35.9 (96.6)	33.9 (93.0)	34.1 (93.4)	32.0 (89.6)	27.8 (82.0)	22.5 (72.5)	31.2 (88.2)
Daily mean °C (°F)	13.5 (56.3)	16.7 (62.1)	22.0 (71.6)	28.3 (82.9)	32.8 (91.0)	33.0 (91.4)	31.3 (88.3)	29.9 (85.8)	29.3 (84.7)	25.0 (77.0)	19.9 (67.8)	15.0 (59.0)	24.5 (76.1)
Mean daily minimum °C (°F)	6.9 (44.4)	9.5 (49.1)	14.0 (57.2)	19.6 (67.3)	24.6 (76.3)	26.7 (80.1)	26.7 (80.1)	25.8 (78.4)	24.4 (75.9)	18.0 (64.4)	12.0 (53.6)	7.5 (45.5)	17.7 (63.9)
Mean minimum °C (°F)	3.9 (39.0)	4.9 (40.8)	8.6 (47.5)	14.5 (58.1)	19.1 (66.4)	21.6 (70.9)	23.5 (74.3)	23.1 (73.6)	21.8 (71.2)	13.2 (55.8)	7.3 (45.1)	3.5 (38.3)	3.0 (37.4)
Record low °C (°F)	−1.0 (30.2)	0.9 (33.6)	3.7 (38.7)	9.2 (48.6)	14.8 (58.6)	19.1 (66.4)	21.0 (69.8)	21.2 (70.2)	13.9 (57.0)	9.8 (49.6)	2.6 (36.7)	−0.4 (31.3)	−1.0 (30.2)
Average rainfall mm (inches)	13.5 (0.53)	16.9 (0.67)	3.4 (0.13)	8.2 (0.32)	22.7 (0.89)	79.2 (3.12)	135.5 (5.33)	211.4 (8.32)	120.2 (4.73)	15.9 (0.63)	10.7 (0.42)	11.0 (0.43)	648.6 (25.54)
Average rainy days	1.2	1.2	0.5	0.6	1.7	4.3	7.6	8.5	5.5	1.3	1.0	0.8	34.2
Average relative humidity (%) (at 17:30 IST)	54	45	37	28	31	40	63	69	59	45	47	55	48
Average dew point °C (°F)	8 (46)	9 (48)	11 (52)	11 (52)	14 (57)	20 (68)	24 (75)	25 (77)	23 (73)	16 (61)	11 (52)	8 (46)	15 (59)
Average ultraviolet index	5	5	7	9	9	9	8	7	7	7	6	4	6.9
Source 1: India Meteorological Department Time and Date (dewpoints, 1985-2015)
Source 2: Weather Atlas

== Demographics ==
The Gurgaon city area has an estimated population of 876,969, according to the 2011 Census of India.

=== Religion ===
Religion in Gurgaon (2011)
Religion	Percent
Hinduism	91.88%
Islam	4.57%
Sikhism	1.60%
Christianity	0.95%
Jainism	0.79%
Other or not stated	0.21%

Hinduism is the most popular religion in Gurgaon, followed by Islam, Sikhism, and small numbers of Christian and Buddhist followers. Gurgaon has adherents of Hinduism, Sikhism, Islam, Buddhism, Jainism, Christianity and the Baháʼí Faith, among others. There are several places of worship for major religions, including mandirs, gurdwaras, mosques and churches.

Sheetla Mata Mandir, located at the heart of Gurgaon, is a temple dedicated to the wife of Guru Dronacharya, Kripi. The temple hosts fairs and people come to seek blessings of Sheetla Mata, earlier known as Kripi. Sai Ka Aangan temple, spread over an area of 36,000 square feet, is dedicated to Shirdi Sai Baba and has a life size idol of him.

Languages of Gurgaon (2011)
1. Hindi (74.2%)
2. Haryanvi (9.02%)
3. Punjabi (3.78%)
4. Bengali (3.59%)
5. Bhojpuri (1.95%)
6. Others (7.48%)

At the time of the 2011 Census of India, 74.18% of the population spoke Hindi, 9.02% Haryanvi, 3.78% Punjabi, 3.59% Bengali and 1.95% Bhojpuri as their first language.

== Government and politics ==
=== Municipal finance ===
According to financial data published on the CityFinance Portal of the Ministry of Housing and Urban Affairs, the Gurugram Municipal Corporation reported total revenue receipts of ₹631 crore (US$76 million) and total expenditure of ₹577 crore (US$69 million) in 2022–23. Tax revenue accounted for about 29.2% of the total revenue, while the corporation received ₹155 crore in grants during the financial year.

== Cityscape ==
=== Architecture ===
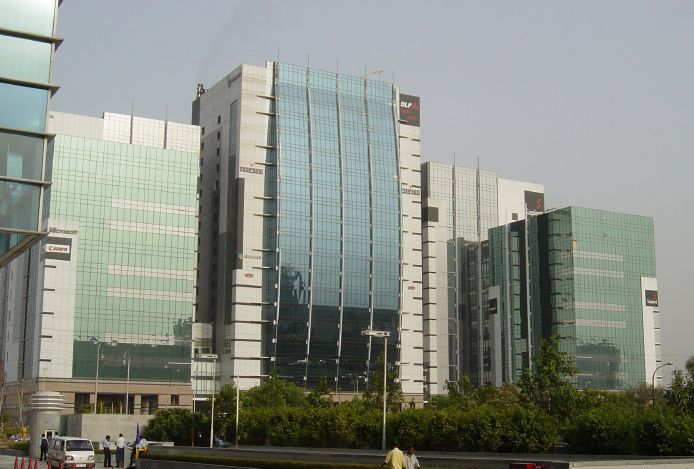
Cyber Green Building

Gurgaon has architecturally noteworthy buildings in a wide range of styles and from distinct time periods. Gurgaon's skyline with its many skyscrapers is nationally recognised, and the city has been home to several tall buildings with modern planning. Gurgaon has an estimated 1,892 high-rises.

=== Neighbourhoods ===
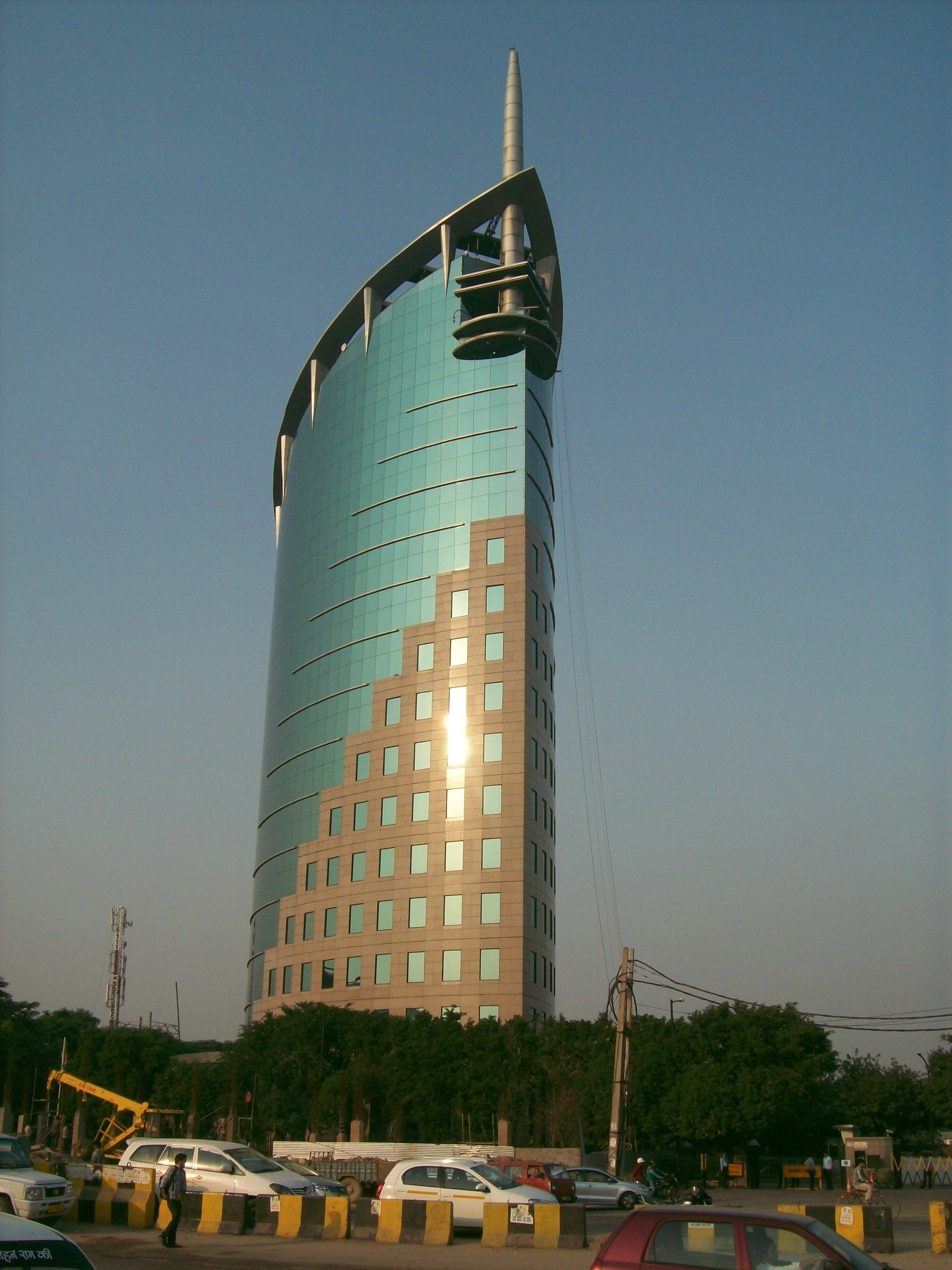
Gateway Towers, Gurgaon

Gurgaon is divided into 36 wards, with each ward further divided into blocks. Gurgaon is also divided into 115 sectors similar to other new Indian cities like Noida and Chandigarh. The housing type in the city consists largely of attached housing, though many attached multi-dwelling units, including apartments, condominiums and high rise residential towers are getting popular.

=== Parks ===
Gurgaon has a complex park system, with various lands operated by the Gurgaon Metropolitan Development Authority. The key parks are Leisure Valley Park in Sector 29, which is over 15 hectares (36 acres); Tau Devi Lal Biodiversity Botanical Garden in Sector 52; Navisha Park in Malibu Towne, Sector-47; Netaji Subhash Chandra Bose Park in Sector 14, popularly known as HUDA Garden; Tau Devi Lal park in Sector 23; and Aravali Biodiversity Park on MG Road. There are local parks in almost all sectors in Old Gurgaon.

== Culture ==
=== Entertainment and performing arts ===
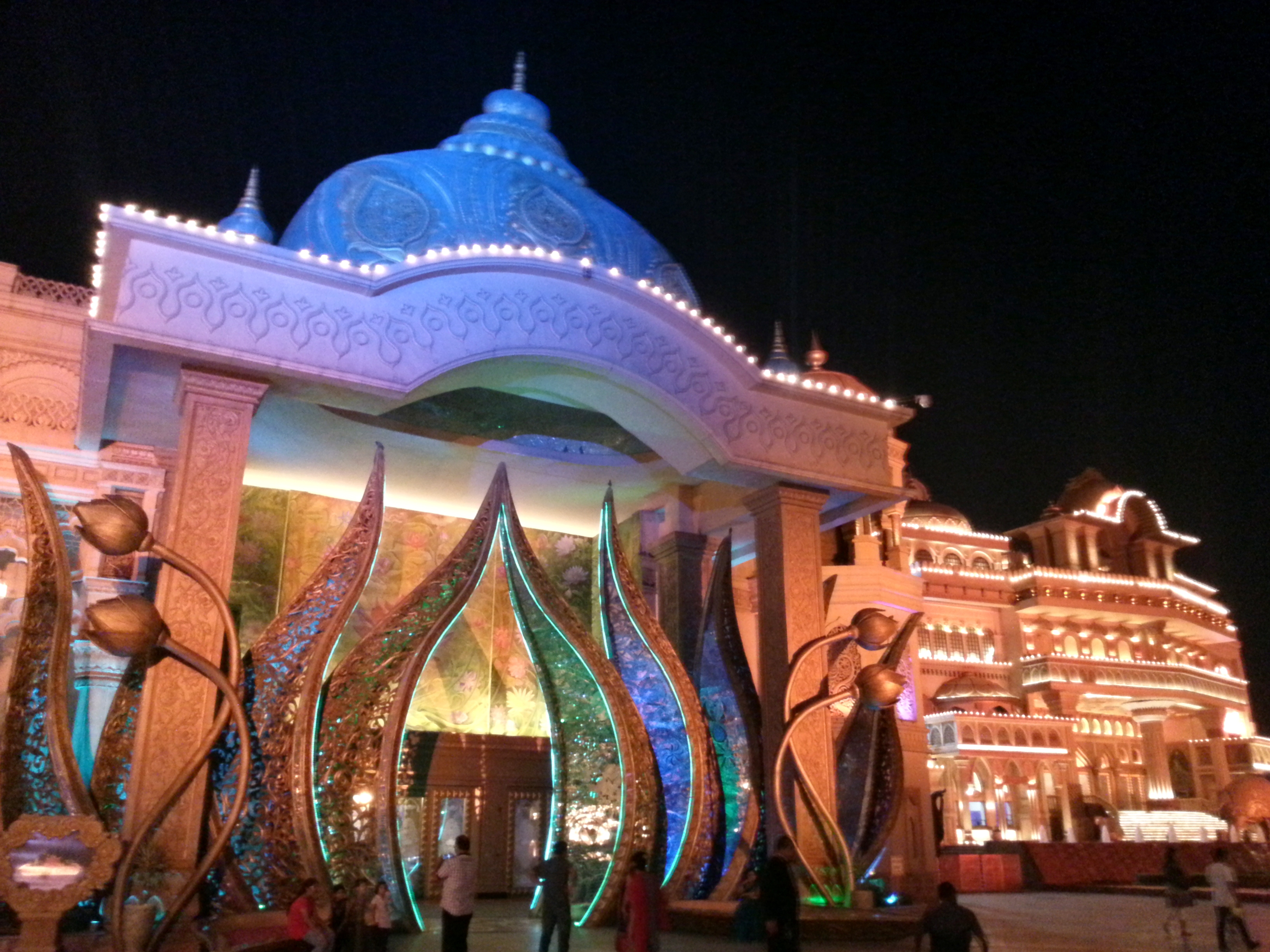
Kingdom of Dreams

Notable performing art venues in the city include Epicentre in Sector 44 and Nautanki Mehal at the Kingdom of Dreams near IFFCO Chowk. Gurgaon also has Museo Camera, a photography museum established by photographer Aditya Arya that displays historic cameras and photographic archives.

Bollywood actor Rajkummar Rao was born in Gurgaon.

=== Languages and dialect ===
The lingua franca spoken in Gurgaon is Hindi, though a segment of the population understands and speaks English. The local dialect spoken in the region is known as Ahirwati. The dialect used in Hindi is similar to that of Delhi, and is considered neutral, though the regional influences from the states of Haryana, Uttar Pradesh and Punjab adds an accent to the language. English is spoken with an Indian accent, with a primarily North Indian influence. Since Gurgaon has many international call centres, the employees are usually given formal training in neutral pronunciation in order to be understandable to native English speakers. Haryanvi and Punjabi are other popular languages spoken in the city.

=== Sports ===
The city has two major sports stadiums: Tau Devi Lal Stadium in Sector 38, which has facilities for cricket, football, basketball and athletics as well as a sports hostel, and Nehru Stadium which is designed for football and athletics. Amity United FC is a tenant of Tau Devi Lal Stadium. Gurgaon district has nine golf courses and is described as the "heart of India's golfing country".

Joginder Rao, a domestic cricket player, was from Gurgaon.

== Economy ==
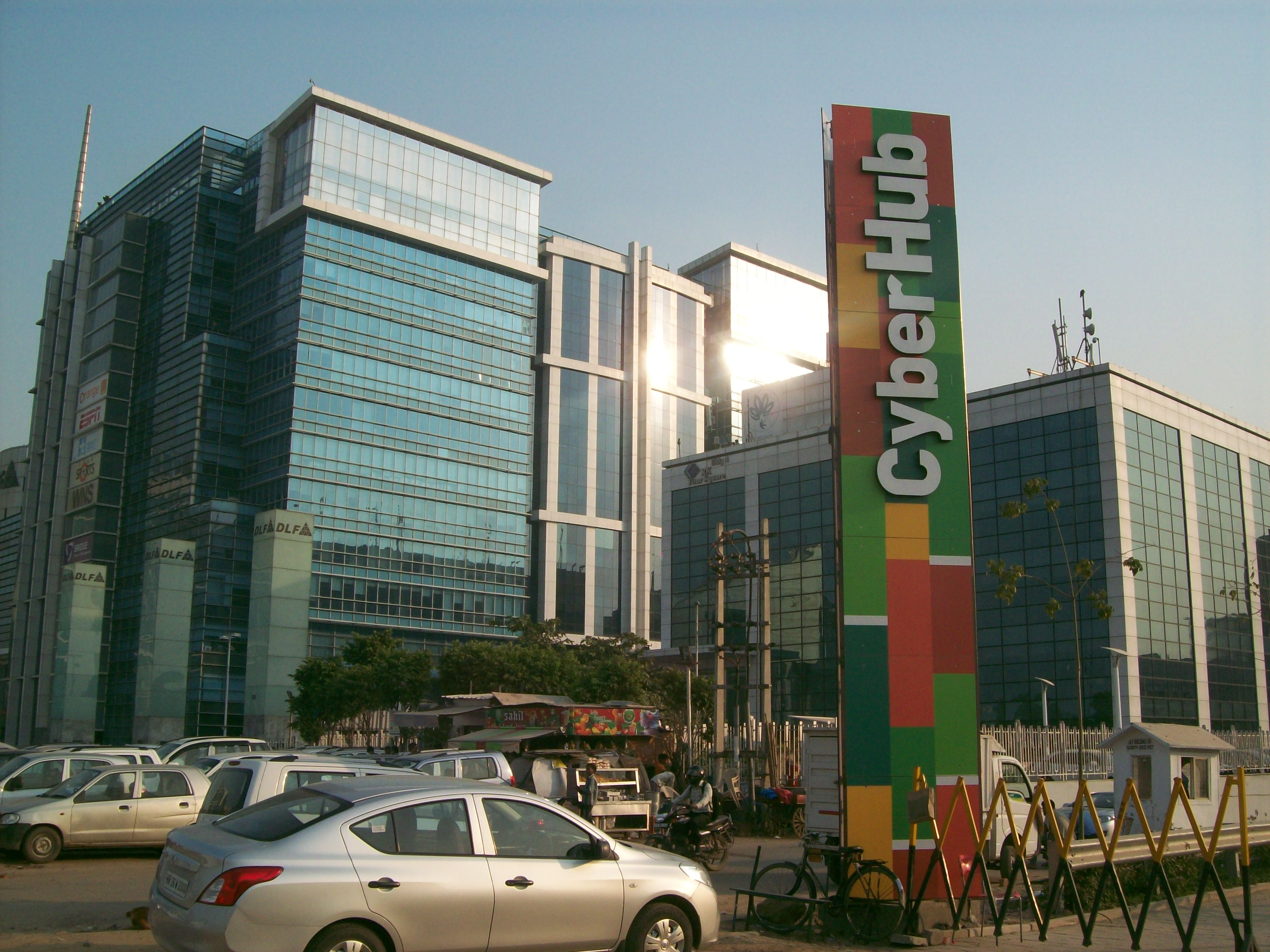
A commercial area in the DLF Cyber City.

Gurgaon has the third highest per-capita income in India and is the site of Indian offices for half of Fortune 500 companies. The city benefits from its close proximity to Delhi.

Maruti Suzuki Private Limited was the first company that set up a manufacturing unit in the city in the 1970s, making cars. Eventually, DLF Limited, a real estate company, acquired large amounts of land in the city. The first major American brand to set up a unit in Gurgaon was General Electric (GE) in 1997. GE's setup in Gurgaon prompted other companies, both international and domestic, to follow suit, providing outsourcing solutions in software, IT, service and sales through delivery facilities and call centres.

Apart from business process outsourcing and the IT sectors, the city is the Indian headquarters of Coca-Cola, Pepsi, BMW, Hyundai, Cargill and Nissan. Major Indian airlines like Air India, IndiGo, SpiceJet, and Air India Express have their global headquarters in the city, making it the largest civil aviation hub of India.

Due to unreliable power, water supply, most major companies in the city have their own backup. Due to the lack of public transport and the inability of most employees to afford a personal vehicle, Genpact provides taxis for transporting its 10,000 employees to and from their offices.

Retail is an important industry in Gurgaon, with the presence of 26 shopping malls.

== Law and government ==
Gurgaon is governed by the Gurgaon Municipal Corporation, which follows a mayor-council system. In 2017, the GMDA (Gurugram Metropolitan Development Authority) was formed, which looks after the city's infrastructure.

== Crime ==
As per the authorities, the following is the key crime data of Gurgaon for 2022:

Nature of crime	Number of cases (2022)	% change (as compared to 2021)	Notes
Homicide	88		80% cases solved and perpetrators arrested.
Rape	187	-15% (Decline)	
Child sex abuse	214	-21% (decline)	
Molestation	214	-9% (decline)	
Robbery/loot	62	-2% (Decline)	88% cases solved.
Burglary	353	-5% (decline)	
Snatching	216	+27% (rise)	Majority of the cases solved. Tracing ratio improved from 46% to 73%.
Vehicle theft	3,523	-2% (decline)	
Narcotic Drugs and Psychotropic Substances Act cases	162		Over 465 kg ganja, 1.8 kg sulpha drugs, 1.9 kg heroin & 25 gm MDMA seized.
Gambling	381		
Excise act cases	1,461		Over 63,558 bottles of imported liquor, 80,914 bottles of country-made liquor & 12,917 bottles of beer seized.
Arms act cases	354		
Challans (Traffic tickets) issued for traffic violations	7,33,933		
Vehicles impounded under scrappage program	1,458		Diesel vehicles older than 10 years and petrol vehicles older than 15 years impounded.
Proclaimed offenders arrested	800	+46% (rise)	
Bail jumpers held	357	+179% (rise)	

The police department in Gurgaon is headed by the Commissioner of Police - Gurgaon Police, which forms a part of the Haryana Police and reports to the Haryana state government. Gurgaon Police has a separate traffic police department headquartered in sector 51. Fire protection within the city limits is provided by the Gurgaon Municipal Corporation through four fire stations, located in sector 29, sector 37, Udyog Vihar and Bhim Nagar.

In 2018, the first cyber police station was inaugurated in the city. As per the authorities, around 1,500 complaints related to cybercrime, including cyber fraud, online banking fraud, cheating through bank cards, social media complaints & data theft, are received every month. Due to a shortage of in-house cyber experts, the police largely outsource such cases to external organisations.

== Education ==
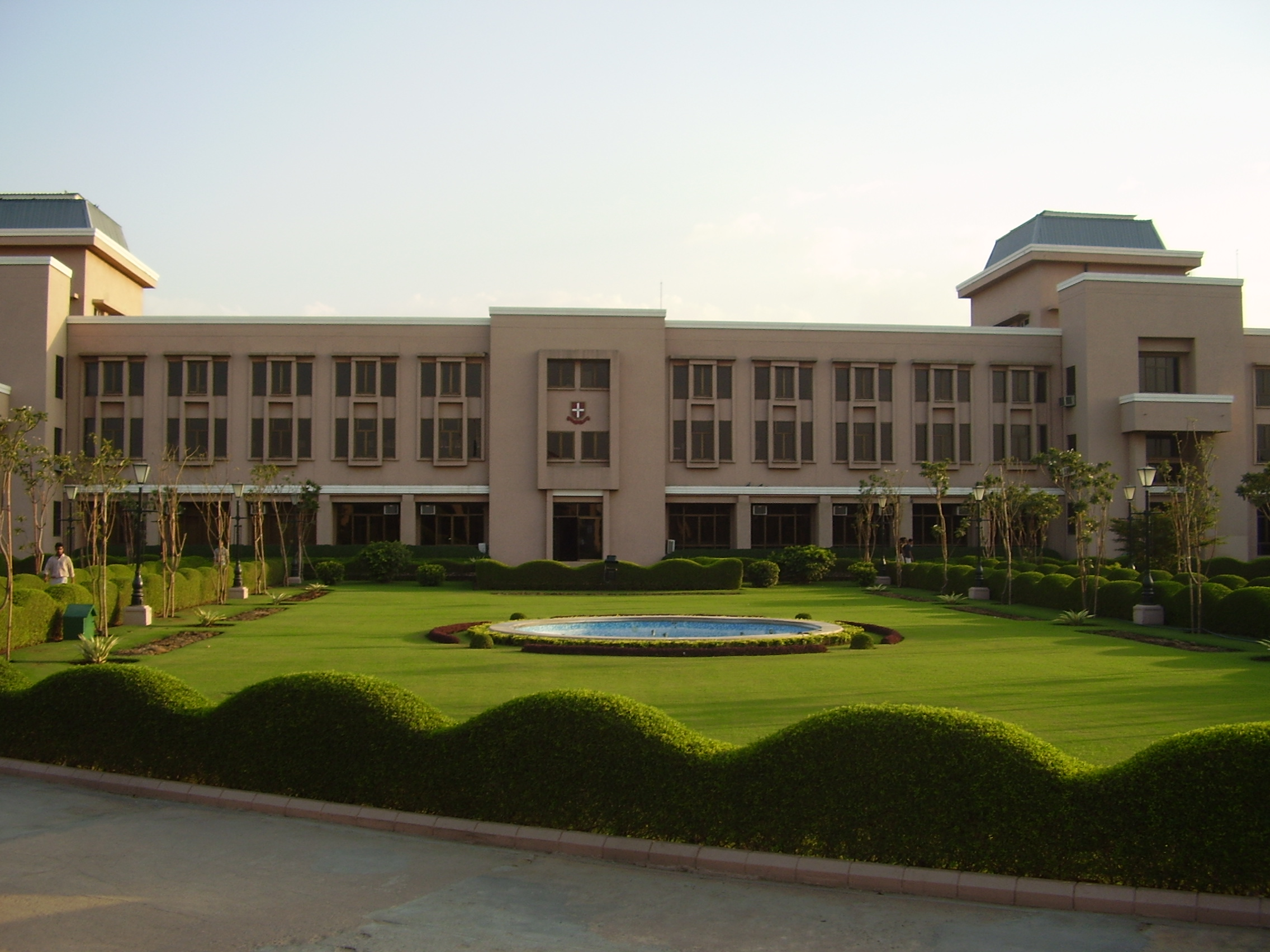
The NorthCap University

The city's public school system is managed by the government of Haryana and administered by Haryana Board of School Education. There are other schools affiliated to the Central Board of Secondary Education, Indian Certificate of Secondary Education and International Baccalaureate boards. Key schools in the city include Ambience Public School, Blue Bells Model School, Delhi Public School, GEMS International School, Heritage Xperiential Learning School, Kunskapsskolan International, K R Mangalam World School, Lancers International School, Ryan International School, Salwan Public School, SCR Public School, Shalom Hills International School, The Shri Ram School and Vega Schools.

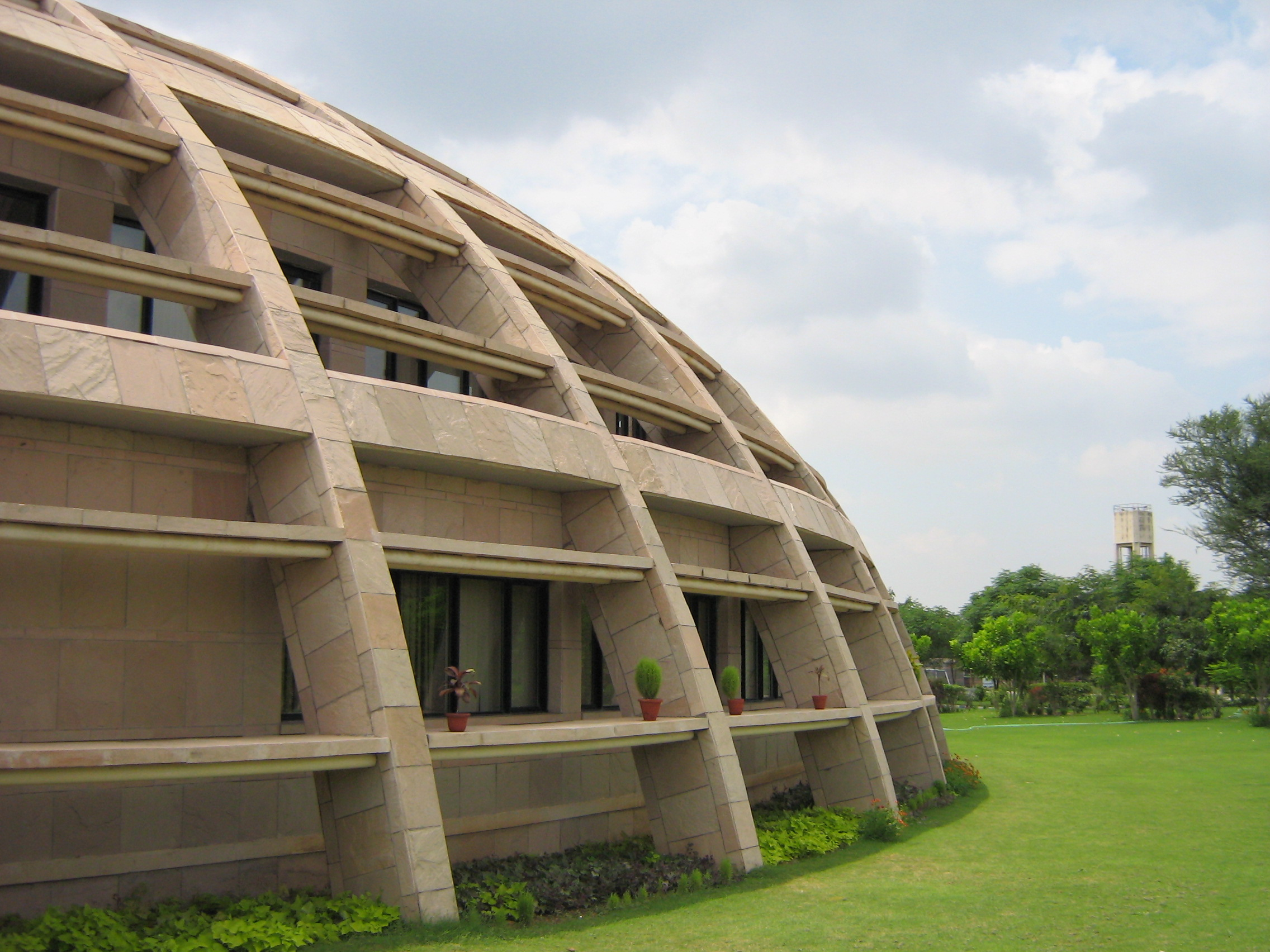
National Brain Research Centre

There are several universities and institutes, offering bachelor's, master's, doctorate and other programs, located in Gurgaon and the surrounding area, including Sushant University, NorthCap University, GD Goenka University, K.R. Mangalam University, Amity University, Management Development Institute, Great Lakes Institute of Management, Infinity Business School, BML Munjal University, Shree Guru Gobind Singh Tricentenary University.

== Transport ==
=== Roadways ===
The major highway that links Gurgaon is National Highway 48, the road that runs from Delhi to Mumbai. While the 27.7-kilometre (17.2 mi) Delhi-Gurgaon border-Kherki Dhaula stretch has been developed as the Delhi–Gurgaon Expressway, the rest is expanded to six lanes.

=== Railways ===
==== Intercity rail ====
Gurgaon railway station is operated by Northern Railway of Indian Railways. Railway stations in Gurgaon include Tajnagar, Dhankot, Farrukhnagar, Patli, and Ghari Harsaru Railway Junction.

==== Delhi Metro ====
The five stations served by Delhi Metro Rail Corporation, located on the Yellow Line, are Millennium City Centre, IFFCO Chowk, MG Road, Sikanderpur and Guru Droncharya.

There are plans to extend metro coverage in the future.

==== Gurugram Metro ====
The Gurugram Metro's Rapid Metro line has eleven stations in Gurgaon, with an interchange with Yellow Line of Delhi Metro at Sikanderpur metro station. The Rapid Metro became operational in November 2013 and currently covers a distance of 11.7 kilometres (7.3 mi). One more phase of the project is in the pipeline and would take the total number of subway stations in the city to 16. An estimated 33,000 people ride the Rapid Metro every day, which provides an exclusive elevated transit service with three coach trains that run in a loop.

Line 2 of the Gurugram Metro began construction in 2025 and is expected to open in 2028.

=== Airways ===
==== Airport ====
Gurgaon is served by Delhi's Indira Gandhi International Airport, which is located just outside of Gurgaon city limits near National Highway 48.

=== Transit systems ===
==== Public transit ====
In November 2013, Gurgaon launched an Ciclovia-inspired initiative known as Raahgiri Day—in which a corridor of streets is closed to motor vehicle traffic on Sunday mornings to encourage the use of non-motorised transport and participation in outdoor leisure activities. Gurgaon was the first city in India to implement such a program, followed by New Delhi, and later Noida.

Gurgaon is also expected to get India's first pod taxis.

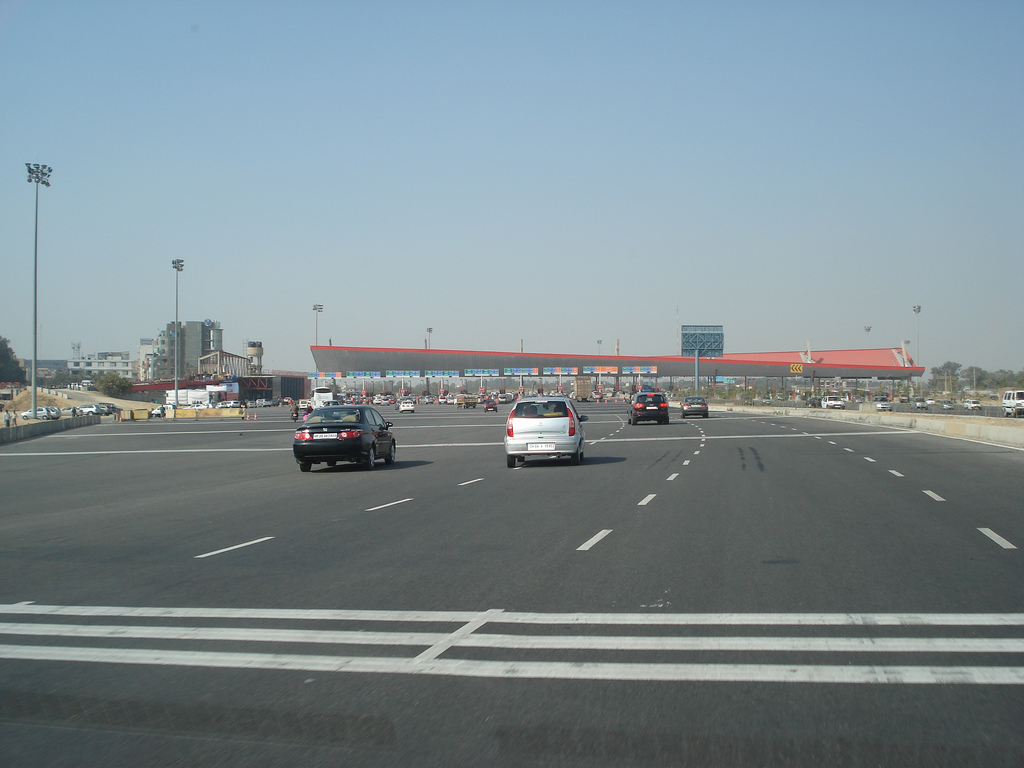
Toll gate of the Delhi Gurgaon Expressway

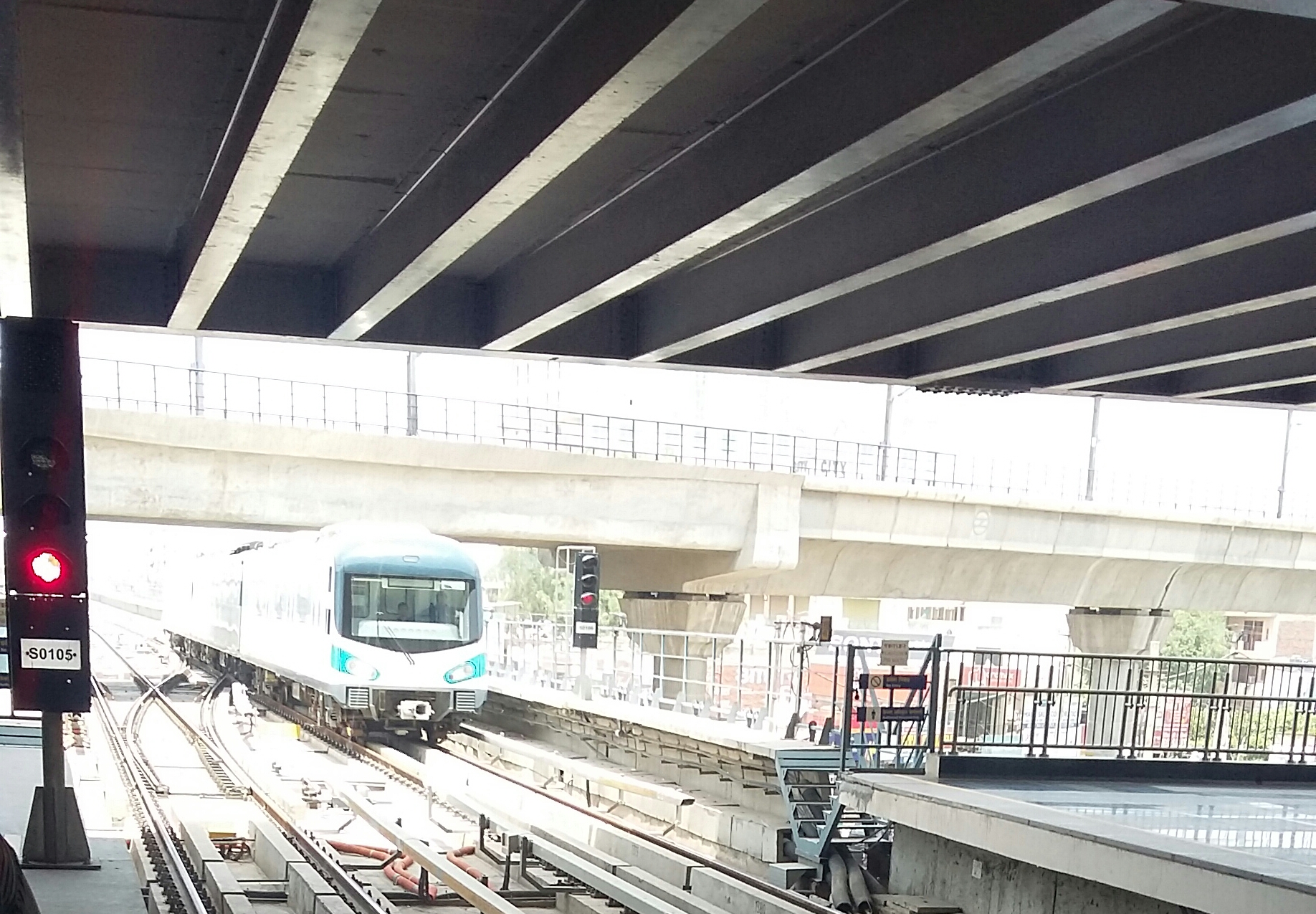
The Gurgaon Rapid Metro serves the city of Gurgaon.

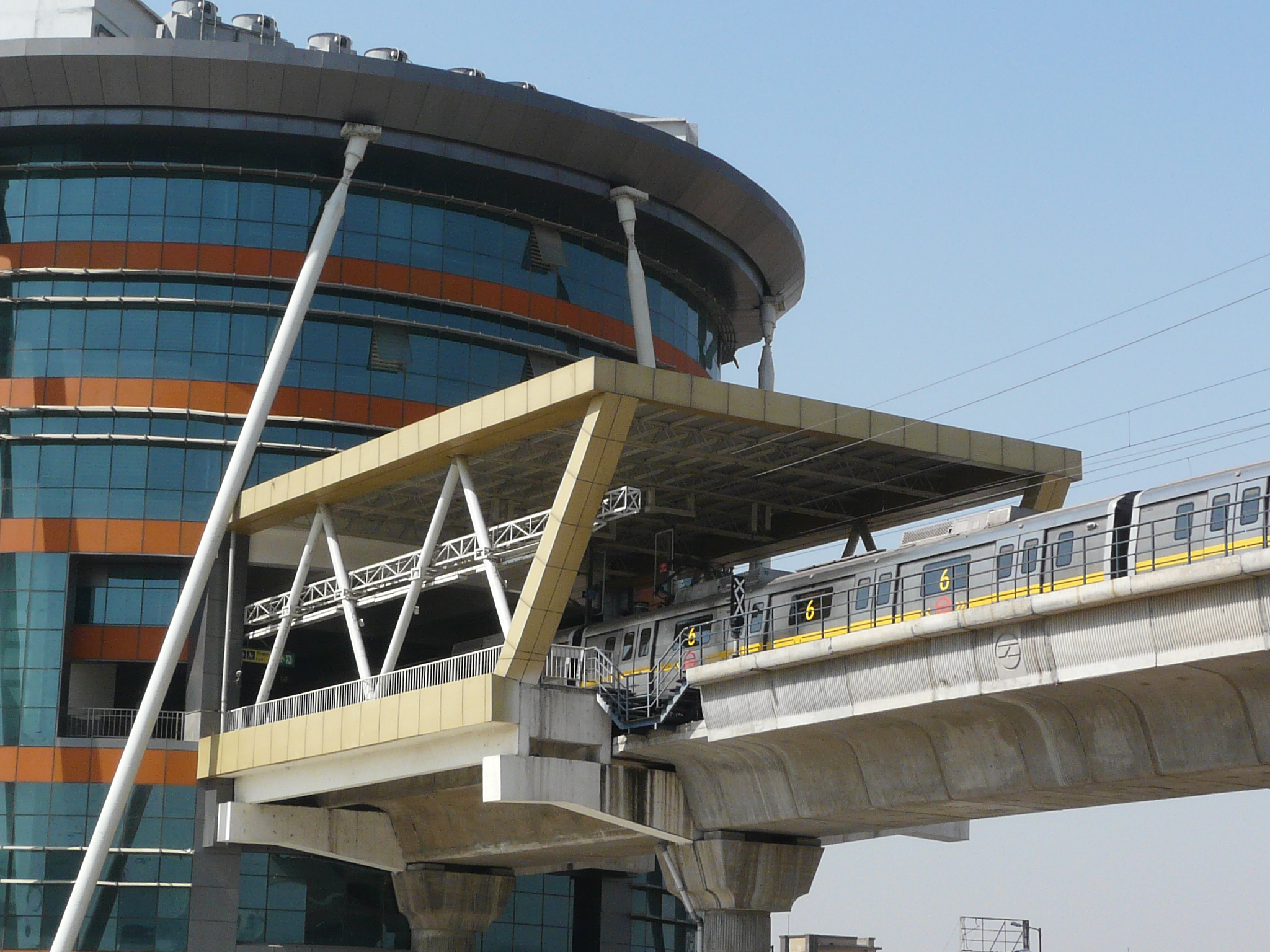
Millennium City Centre metro station on the Yellow Line of Delhi Metro

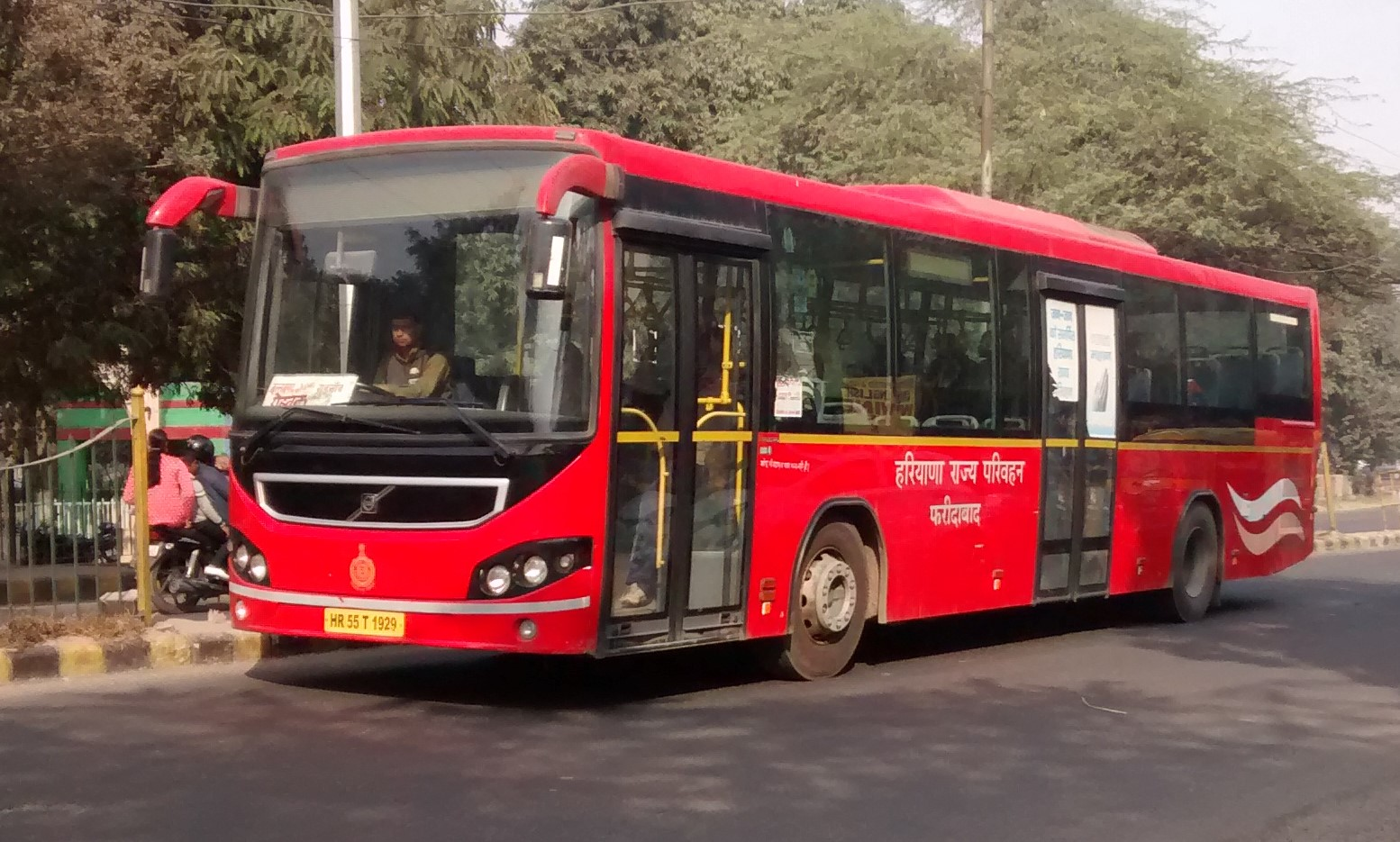
Haryana Roadways operates buses on intercity routes in the city.

== Utilities ==
Electricity in Gurgaon is provided by the government-owned Dakshin Haryana Bijli Vitran Nigam. Gurgaon has a power consumer base of 360,000 with an average power load of 700-800 MW. There are frequent power outages in the city, especially during the peak consumption season of summer. Apart from the power deficit, the equipment used by the power department like transformers, panels and transmission lines are either old or overburdened.

== Issues ==
=== Urban Flooding ===
Gurgaon is notorious for its urban floods every monsoon. The areas on NH-8 around Hero Honda Chowk, Basai, Dhankot, sector 37 etc. see massive urban floods and headlines grabbing traffic jams reported widely in news media. A recent research report puts the blame on the broken natural water body linkage and obstructions in the flow in the city due to frantic construction during the last decades. The HUDA master drainage lines get choked or burst at the seams. Disruptions in the hydrological flow of natural drains and limited drainage capacity are all primary reasons for the floods. Gurgaon's Ghata Jheel, Badshahpur Jheel, Khandsa Talab were linked to Najafgarh drain which links to Yamuna river, via natural water channels and drains. As per the ground reports and research, the three natural water bodies are struggling for their existence with encroachments on their lands and natural channels. Agencies responsible have tried to create artificial water bodies to compensate, but the efforts fail due to unpredictable rain and water flow patterns leading to deployment of water pumps to fight the situation. In 2012, Punjab & Haryana High court banned ground water usage for construction activity, and NGT has recently reprimanded authorities for drain concretisation.

== See also ==
- National Capital Region
- New Gurgaon
- Largest Indian cities by GDP
