= Phase =

Phase or phases may refer to:

== Science ==
- State of matter, or phase, one of the distinct forms in which matter can exist
- Phase (matter), a region of space throughout which all physical properties are essentially uniform
- Phase space, a mathematical space in which each possible state of a physical system is represented by a point –also referred to as a "microscopic state"
  - Phase space formulation, a formulation of quantum mechanics in phase space
- Phase (waves), the position of a point in time (an instant) on a waveform cycle
  - Instantaneous phase, generalization for both cyclic and non-cyclic phenomena
- AC phase, the phase offset between alternating current electric power in multiple conducting wires
  - Single-phase electric power, distribution of AC electric power in a system where the voltages of the supply vary in unison
  - Three-phase electric power, a common method of AC electric power generation, transmission, and distribution
- Phase problem, the loss of information (the phase) from a physical measurement
- Phase factor, a complex scalar used in quantum mechanics
- In continuous Fourier transform, the angle of a complex coefficient representing the phase of one sinusoidal component
- The argument or angle of complex numbers is sometimes called the phase

=== Other sciences ===
- Archaeological phase, a discrete period of occupation at an archaeological site
- Color phase, in biology, a group of individuals within a species with a particular coloration
- Gametic phase, in genetics, the relationship between alleles at two chromosomal loci
- Lunar phase, the appearance of the Moon as viewed from the Earth
- Planetary phase, the appearance of the illuminated section of a planet
- Phase separation, in physical chemistry, the separation of a liquid mixture into two immiscible liquids above and below a meniscus
- Phase (syntax), in linguistics, a cyclic domain (proposed by Noam Chomsky)
- In biology, a part of the cell cycle in which cells divide (mitosis) or reproduce (meiosis)

== Music ==
- Phase music, a compositional process often associated with minimalism
- Phase (band), a Greek alternative rock band
- Phases (band), an indie pop American band, formerly known as JJAMZ
- Phase (Jack Garratt album), 2016
- Phases (The Who album), a 1981 box set of albums by The Who
- Phases (I See Stars album), 2015
- Phase (Mildlife album), 2017
- Phases (Angel Olsen album), 2017
- "Phases" (Alma and French Montana song), 2017
- Phases (Chase Atlantic album), 2019
- "Phases", a song by English alternative rock band Keane from their 2019 album Cause and Effect
- Piano Phase, Reed Phase, Violin Phase and Phase Patterns are musical compositions by Steve Reich

=== Other entertainment ===
- "Phases" (Buffy the Vampire Slayer), a 1998 episode of the TV series Buffy the Vampire Slayer
- Phases (.hack), fictional monsters in the .hack franchise
- Phase, an incarnation of the DC Comics character Phantom Girl

== Other uses ==
- Phase 10, a card game created by Fundex Games
- Phase (video game), a 2007 music game for the iPod developed by Harmonix Music Systems
- Phase (combat), usually a period of combat within a larger military operation

== See also ==
- Phase 1 (disambiguation)
- Phase 2 (disambiguation)
- Phase 3 (disambiguation)
- Phase 4 (disambiguation)
- Phase 5 (disambiguation)
- Phase space (disambiguation)
- Phaser (disambiguation)
- Phasing (disambiguation)
- Phasor (disambiguation)
- Phaze, a fictional world in Piers Anthony's Apprentice Adept series
- Faze (disambiguation)
- FASOR (disambiguation)
- Stage (disambiguation)
