= THOR (weapon) =

Directed energy systems

The Tactical High-power Operational Responder (THOR) is a high-power microwave directed energy weapon developed by the United States Air Force Research Laboratory (AFRL).

== Design ==
THOR is designed to counter unmanned aerial vehicles (UAVs) by sending out a high-power, short pulse of microwaves to disable electronics through overwhelming critical components intended to carry electrical currents. This is effective at intercepting drone swarms; while a laser needs time to burn through one at a time, a High-Power Microwave (HPM) weapon can fire in an arc to disable multiple UAVs at once and refire in rapid succession. Compared to hard-kill methods for engaging drones, THOR's radio bursts have a wider engagement range, are silent, and are instantaneous. Intended for base defense, the system resembles a 20 ft (6.1 m) shipping container with a satellite dish attached. It can be transported on a C-130 Hercules and assembled by two personnel in under three hours.

== History ==
THOR first began testing in spring 2019. The system was developed quickly in 18 months for $18 million. The program represents a collaboration between AFRL, BAE Systems, Leidos, and Verus Research, an engineering firm based in Albuquerque. An Air Force official said in December 2020 that THOR was being tested "in a real-world setting" in Africa, but that statement was then retracted.

The AFRL began solicitations for contractors to develop a follow-on prototype to THOR in July 2021 called Mjölnir, named after Thor's hammer. Mjölnir will incorporate improvements in capability, reliability, and manufacturing readiness to produce a deployable system that can be made in large numbers. In February 2022, the AFRL awarded Leidos a $26 million contract to build the system.

On 5 April 2023, THOR successfully engaged multiple targets in a simulated swarm attack in a demonstration at the Chestnut Test Site, Kirtland Air Force Base; the number of drones downed and at what range was not disclosed.

== See also ==
- Counter-electronics High Power Microwave Advanced Missile Project
- Death ray – Theoretical weapon
- Epirus Leonidas – American high-power microwave (HPM) weapon
- FK-4000 – Chinese high-power microwave weapon
- Hurricane (weapon) – Chinese high-power microwave weapon
- Radio Frequency Directed Energy Weapon – United Kingdom radio-frequency directed-energy weapon (RF-DEW) demonstrator
- Raytheon Phaser – Directed-energy weapon
