= RapidDestroyer =

United Kingdom radio-frequency directed-energy weapon (RF-DEW) demonstrator

RapidDestroyer is the commercial name for a United Kingdom radio-frequency directed-energy weapon (RF-DEW) and electronic warfare demonstrator, built to "track, target and defeat swarms of drones", currently under development for the British Armed Forces. It is being developed as part of Project Ealing, a joint project of the Ministry of Defence's Defence Science and Technology Laboratory (Dstl) and Defence Equipment & Support DE&S agencies, working in conjunction with a team of industry partners, named Team Hersa, which includes Thales UK, QinetiQ, Teledyne e2v and Horiba Mira. It was first unveiled publicly on 16 May 2024 and was field tested for the first time in December 2024. During its first trials, the system was mounted on an RMMV HX60 4×4 truck chassis, and neutralised over 100 drones, while in one experiment the system brought down two swarms of drones in a single engagement.

== Background ==
The operational use of drones in terrorism and warfare has evolved from limited experimentation in the 1990s to widespread adoption by both state and non-state actors. Early attempts by violent extremist organizations were sporadic and constrained, but groups such as Hezbollah and Hamas, often supported by Iran, pioneered the use of unmanned aerial vehicles (UAVs) for reconnaissance, propaganda, and limited attack roles. A major turning point occurred between 2014 and 2018, when the Islamic State weaponized commercial drones at scale, employing them for surveillance, command and control, aerial bomb delivery, and psychological warfare, creating a model later emulated by other groups. Subsequent years saw a plateau, with global affiliates of the Islamic State and al-Qaeda integrating drones for intelligence and attack coordination, while the Houthis, backed by Iran, advanced long-range UAV capabilities and conducted cross-border strikes. Later, Hamas employed drones extensively during its October 2023 assault on Israel, disabling surveillance and delivering munitions, while Hay’at Tahrir al-Sham (HTS) in Syria integrated loitering munitions, suicide drones, and 3D-printed components into combined arms operations. The Russo-Ukrainian War further accelerated innovation in scale, speed, and range, particularly through the use of First-Person View (FPV) drones and large-scale production. According to UK Defence Intelligence, in 2024 "Ukraine had to defend against attacks from more than 18,000 drones", and it is estimated that around 100 different types of drones are in operation there, ranging from small, toy-sized platforms to large models with wingspans approaching 20 metres. Analysts argue that these trends, combined with technologies such as additive manufacturing, artificial intelligence, and hydrogen fuel cells, are lowering barriers to entry and likely to usher in a new wave of terrorist drone tactics that blend mass deployment, speed, and long-range strike capabilities. The RFDEW was developed against the backdrop of these conflicts which have each highlighted the importance of cost-effective counter-UAV systems.

== Concept and features ==
The RapidDestroyer is a high-power microwave weapon system developed primarily by a Thales-led consortium for the United Kingdom, focused on countering the growing threat of drone swarms on modern battlefields. It operates by emitting powerful, targeted bursts of high-frequency radio waves that overload and physically damage the electronics in drones, causing them to crash, delivering what is called a “hard kill” rather than just jamming or disrupting their signals. The system integrates wide-area surveillance radar for detection and tracking with an optical camera for identification in a single highly automated system. The system was revealed following a government pledge to increase defence spending to 2.5% of GDP by 2030.

Primary features of the RapidDestroyer include its ability to engage and neutralize multiple drones at once, making it particularly effective against swarms, something conventional missile systems struggle to achieve economically and tactically. The system can be mounted to a variety of platforms, from ships to ground vehicles, and will be used to defend critical assets and bases. It was successfully field tested by the British Army's 7th Air Defence Group in December 2024. A test conducted in April 2025 in Western Wales downed two swarms of 8 drones in a single engagement, and immobilised more than 100 drones with near-instant effect.

The system is capable of detecting, tracking and engaging multiple targets on the ground, at sea and in the air up to 1 kilometre (0.62 mi) away, with ongoing development to extend this range further. It beams radio waves to disrupt or damage critical electronic components, such as those found in UAVs or aircraft avionics, with instant effect. At an estimated cost of 10 pence (13 cents) per shot, it is a cheaper alternative to missile-based systems, such as the Aster which has a unit cost of US$1.3-2.5 million. It is capable of defending against drone swarms and is designed with extensive automation, meaning it can be operated by a single person. A 106 Regiment Royal Artillery operator described the demonstrator as quick to learn and easy to use.

=== Limitations ===
RapidDestroyer's design permits integration into broader air defense networks and supports land-based, naval, and potentially airborne configurations, however its high power requirements currently limit the flexibility of its deployment and present several operational constraints. Its effectiveness is sensitive to environmental conditions; adverse weather and complex terrain potentially degrade performance, and dense urban areas, with numerous reflective surfaces and electric fields, may reduce beam precision and effective range. The demonstrator's mobile truck-mounted configuration is limited by the system's substantial power requirements, imposing logistical constraints on deployment. Additionally, extending the engagement envelope of one kilometre or adapting the system for more complex operational scenarios remains a technical challenge. Furthermore, experts expressed concern that deployment in urban areas could cause collateral damage to civilian electronics and non-military infrastructure, such as airports. Despite the advantages of the system, doubts remain regarding its maturity, and as of April 17, 2025, the MoD has not approved its integration into the military.

== See also ==
- Counter-electronics High Power Microwave Advanced Missile Project
- Death ray
- Epirus Leonidas
- Fk-4000
- Hurricane (weapon)
- Raytheon Phaser
- Drone warfare
