= Love Game =

Love Game, Love Games, or The Love Game may refer to:

== Film, TV and theatre ==
=== Film ===
- The Love Game (film), a 1960 French film
- Love Game, 1995 Indian film
- Love Games (film), a 2016 Indian film

=== Television ===
- The Love Game (game show), 1984 Australian game show broadcast by Seven Network
- Love Game (TV series), 2009 Japanese drama series
- "Love Games", a television episode of Adventure Time.
- Love Games: Bad Girls Need Love Too, 2010 American reality TV series
- "The Love Game" (Doctor Doctor), a 1990 episode of the American sitcom

=== Theatre ===
- The Love Game, presented at New Arts Theatre, October 1964, starring British actress Jill Bennett

== Music ==
=== Albums ===
- Love Games, a 1975 album by The Drifters
- Love Games (album), by Evan Rogers, 1985
- Love Games, by Faze, 1991

=== Songs ===
- "Love Games" (Belle and the Devotions song), 1984
- "Love Game", a song by Eminem, from the album The Marshall Mathers LP 2 (2013)
- "Love Games" (Level 42 song), 1981
- "LoveGame", a song by Lady Gaga, from the album The Fame (2008)
- "Love Game", a song by Pure Energy
- "Love Game", a song by Tyga, from the album Careless World: Rise of the Last King (2012)
- "Love Games", a song by Strange Advance, 1983
- "The Love Game" (song), a 1975 song by John Paul Young
- "The Love Game", song by The Mudlarks, 1959

== See also ==
- This Game of Love, an album by Vic Damone
- The Game of Love (disambiguation)
- For Love of the Game (disambiguation)
