= Phasing (disambiguation) =

Phasing may refer to:

- Phasing, a technique in musical composition
- Phasing, the use of the Phaser (effect), an audio signal processing technique

== Science ==
- Phase-out of chlorofluorocarbon
- Phase-out of incandescent light bulbs
- Fossil fuel phase-out
- Phase-out of lightweight plastic bags
- Nuclear power phase-out

== Entertainment ==
- Marching band phasing
- Phasing (Magic mechanic) a creature mechanic in Magic: The Gathering

== See also ==
- Phase (disambiguation)
- Phaser (disambiguation)
- Phasor (disambiguation)
- Out-of-body experience
