= Epirus Leonidas =

American high-power microwave (HPM) weapon

The Leonidas is a high-power microwave (HPM) weapon developed to disable unmanned aerial vehicle (UAV) swarms. It was named after Leonidas I, king of Sparta, who fought a defensive battle against numerically superior enemy forces.

== Design and development ==
Epirus was founded in 2018 to enter the counter-drone market and it unveiled the Leonidas in 2020. The threat of small drones, especially cheap consumer models, is difficult to counter in large numbers using traditional kinetic means. Against regular air defenses, cheap drones can be deployed in large numbers to overwhelm a defender or force them to expend more expensive interceptors. Leonidas is designed as a directed energy weapon that fires electromagnetic pulse (EMP) beams to disable electronics. The system is able to pick individual targets or cover a large area in wide beam mode to affect any electronic device that passes through. While it was intended to be used against airborne drone threats, it has the ability to knock out ground vehicles and sea vessels; it works against any electronics, and has been demonstrated to disable an outboard ship motor.

Due to its use of gallium nitride transistors previously used in radars instead of magnetron vacuum tubes, Leonidas can maintain a durable microwave beam while being smaller and requiring less power. As a directed EMP, the system has advantages over other DEWs; lasers can only be used against one target at a time while an HPM can focus on a large area, and it works against autonomous UAVs with no link back to an operator that radio jamming would be ineffective against. Because it is software-based, it is able to discriminate between enemy and friendly aircraft, allowing it to take down enemy drones while enabling friendly ones to operate in the same vicinity. The original configuration was as a towed trailer. In October 2021, Epirus and General Dynamics announced they were teaming to integrate Leonidas onto the Stryker to provide mobile short-range air defense. Epirus unveiled the Leonidas Pod in February 2022 capable of being carried by a heavy-lift UAV. The Leonidas Expeditionary Directed Energy Counter-Swarm (ExDECS) was unveiled in September 2024 as a small version for mobile forces such as the U.S. Marine Corps. The Leonidas H2O, a system one-third the size of the original, was used in a U.S. Navy exercise in August 2024 to disable small boat motors. It was effective at 100 meters working at half power, and can achieve greater ranges than normal by reflecting off the water's surface.

On 23 January 2023, Epirus was awarded a $66.1 million contract by the Rapid Capabilities and Critical Technologies Office (RCCTO) to deliver the Leonidas to the U.S. Army as part of the Indirect Fire Protection Capability-High-Power Microwave (IFPC-HPM) program after outperforming six other systems. Four prototypes were to be produced by 2024 and then transitioned to a program of record in 2025. Epirus announced on 1 November 2023 that the first prototype had been delivered and all four were delivered by March 2024. Some of the IFPC-HPM prototypes were deployed to CENTCOM to see how they perform in a real-world environment, with two deployed by early 2025.

== See also ==
- Counter-electronics High Power Microwave Advanced Missile Project
- FK-4000
- Hurricane (weapon)
- THOR (weapon)
- Radio Frequency Directed Energy Weapon
