= Faze =

Faze may refer to:

- Faze (band) a 1980s and early 1990s American soul band
- Faze (magazine), a Canadian magazine for teens and young adults
- Faze (musician) (born 1977), Nigerian musician
- FaZe Clan, a professional esports organization
- Faze FM two defunct radio stations in northern England
- Faze TV (TV channel), a 2005 planned gay-interest channel in England

== See also ==
- Phase (disambiguation)
