= Nominal power (radio broadcasting) =

Nominal power is a measurement of a mediumwave radio station's output used in the United States. AM broadcasters are licensed by the Federal Communications Commission to operate at a specific nominal power, which may be (and usually is) different from the transmitter power output.

- For non-directional stations, nominal power is normally equal to the RF power presented to the antenna, as determined from the base current and the antenna's nominal impedance at the carrier frequency.
- For directional stations, nominal power is normally equal to the RF power at the common point (the point at which the transmitter output branches off into separate phasing networks for each tower).

In both cases, nominal power excludes losses in transmission lines between the tower or phasor and the transmitter; however, it includes losses in a resistor network used to decrease the efficiency of the antenna system.

Nominal power is ultimately a historical artifact of the regulatory regime employed by the FCC prior to the 1980s. In the old system, rather than allowing licensees to choose any power level which would meet the efficiency and interference standards for their class, stations were restricted to a small set of power levels: 50, 100, 250, 500, 1000, 2500, 5000, 10000, 25000, and 50000 watts. A station whose maximum coverage would otherwise be available at 4500 watts (given a specific directional pattern and antenna system efficiency) had a choice of either living with 2500 watts, or reducing the antenna efficiency to a level which would allow for 5 kW. Newly constructed stations could fairly easily design an antenna system to meet the requirements, but stations on or moving to a shared tower with higher efficiency had a problem. The resistor network exception was created to allow stations to reduce their antenna efficiency without having to modify the existing tower.

Rule changes in the 1980s did away with the fixed set of power choices, allowing stations to choose an appropriate power level for their antenna system ("dial-a-power"), so there should no longer be any need for the concept of nominal power. However, stations still take advantage of the resistor exception in some cases, simply because they perceive the marketing advantage of higher power (or at least "round" power) to be worth the cost of the wasted energy.

== See also ==
- Effective radiated power, the regulatory analogue for VHF and UHF broadcasting.
