= Phasor (disambiguation) =

Phasor is a phase vector representing a sine wave.

Phasor may also be:

- Phasor (sound synthesizer), a stereo music, sound and speech synthesizer for the Apple II computer
- Phasor measurement unit, a device that measures phasors on an electricity grid
- Phasor (radio broadcasting), a network of inductors and capacitors used to control the relative amplitude and phase of the radio frequency currents driving a directional antenna array
- Phasor (album), a 2024 album by American musician Helado Negro

== See also ==
- Phase (disambiguation)
- Phaser (disambiguation)
- FASOR (disambiguation)
