= FK-4000 =

Chinese high-power microwave weapon

- Type: Directed-energy weapon
- Place of origin: China

The FK-4000 is a high-power microwave (HPM) air defense system developed by the China Aerospace Science and Industry Corporation (CASIC). It was unveiled by CASIC at the Zhuhai Airshow 2024.

== Design ==
The FK-4000 system consists of a large phased array microwave emitter capable of generating rapid electromagnetic pulses (EMP) and a fire-control radar, an electro-optical system, which are all mounted on a Shaanxi SX2306 cross-country truck chassis.

The FK-4000 system can operate independently or grouped together to form an air defense network. It can also work collaboratively with the FK-3000 missile-based air defense system. The usage of EMP is considered economically beneficial for targeting asymmetric threats. The FK-4000 system can damage and neutralize small drones and drone swarm with a directional area and at a range of 3 km (1.9 mi).

== See also ==
- Hurricane (weapon)
- Epirus Leonidas
- Radio Frequency Directed Energy Weapon
- THOR (weapon)
