= The Game of Love =

Game of Love or The Game of Love may refer to:

== Music ==
- The Game of Love (musical), a 1965 British musical by Tom Jones
- Game of Love (album), a 1990 album by Bad Boys Blue
- The Game of Love (album), a 2006 album by Elena Paparizou
- This Game of Love, album by Vic Damone
- "Game of Love", a song by Ike & Tina Turner from their 1970 album Workin' Together
- "The Game of Love", a song by Daft Punk from their 2013 album Random Access Memories
- "The Game of Love" (Santana song), 2002, featuring Michelle Branch
- "The Game of Love" (Wayne Fontana and the Mindbenders song), 1965, later covered by multiple artists
- "The Game of Love", 1992 single by Tony Hadley

== Film ==
- The Game of Love (1924 film), a German silent film
- The Game of Love (1928 film), a German silent film
- The Game of Love, English title of Le Blé en herbe

== See also ==
- Love Game (disambiguation)
