= Phase 1 =

Phase 1, Phase I or Phase One may refer to:

== Media and music ==
- Marvel Cinematic Universe: Phase One, six American superhero films from 2008–2012
- Phase One (Art Ensemble of Chicago album), 1971
- Phase 1 (Saga album), 1998
- Phase One, renamed Bloodwork (film), a 2012 American-Canadian thriller
- PhaseOne, Australian DJ and electronic music producer

== Other ==
- Phase I clinical trials, the first of the phases of clinical research
- Canadian Phase I, a powered parachute design
- Phase I metabolism, Phase I reaction in drug metabolism
- Phase I environmental site assessment, a report prepared for a real estate holding which identifies potential or existing environmental contamination liabilities
- Phase 1 (bar), a lesbian bar and nightclub at 525 8th Street, Southeast in Washington, D.C
- Phase One (company), a Danish camera equipment company
- Phase 1 metro station
- Phase One Media Pro
- Phase One Endurance

== See also ==
- Phase (disambiguation)
