= Vigilant Eagle =

Proposed DEWS for airports

The Vigilant Eagle Airport Protection System is a proposed directed-energy weapon under development by the U.S. military under a Defense Department contract with Raytheon. It would create an invisible microwave dome around an airport that could block missiles heading toward incoming and outgoing aircraft.

Man-portable air-defense systems (MANPADS) are shoulder-launched surface-to-air missiles (SAMs) that present a substantial threat to civilian and military aircraft. The U.S. government says these types of weapons have been used in at least 36 attacks on civilian aircraft in the past three decades.

== History ==
Raytheon has experimented with directed energy weapons since the inadvertent production of the first microwave oven during testing in 1958.

Raytheon CEO William Swanson has described a greater focus on directed energy systems in recent years.

Raytheon Missile Systems developed Vigilant Eagle under a U.S. Defense Department contract and has discussed with the Department of Homeland Security, the potential of using it at U.S. airports. In 2006, a $4.1 million contract with the Department of Homeland Security was issued to assess the anti-missile system.

Within the last three years, the company's researchers have shot down multiple types of shoulder-fired antiaircraft missiles at a distance of several miles with pulses of microwave energy. The company says that its prototype high-power microwave (HPM) weapon, with an energy focused to within 1 degree, sends an electrical pulse which penetrates through openings in the missile's metal parts and reaches its computers and guidance system. This energy is powerful enough to damage electrical components and scramble computer chips, causing the missile to fly off course. Raytheon has tested the system at an American airport, but both the company and the airport are unwilling to disclose which one because of a confidentiality agreement.

== Effects ==
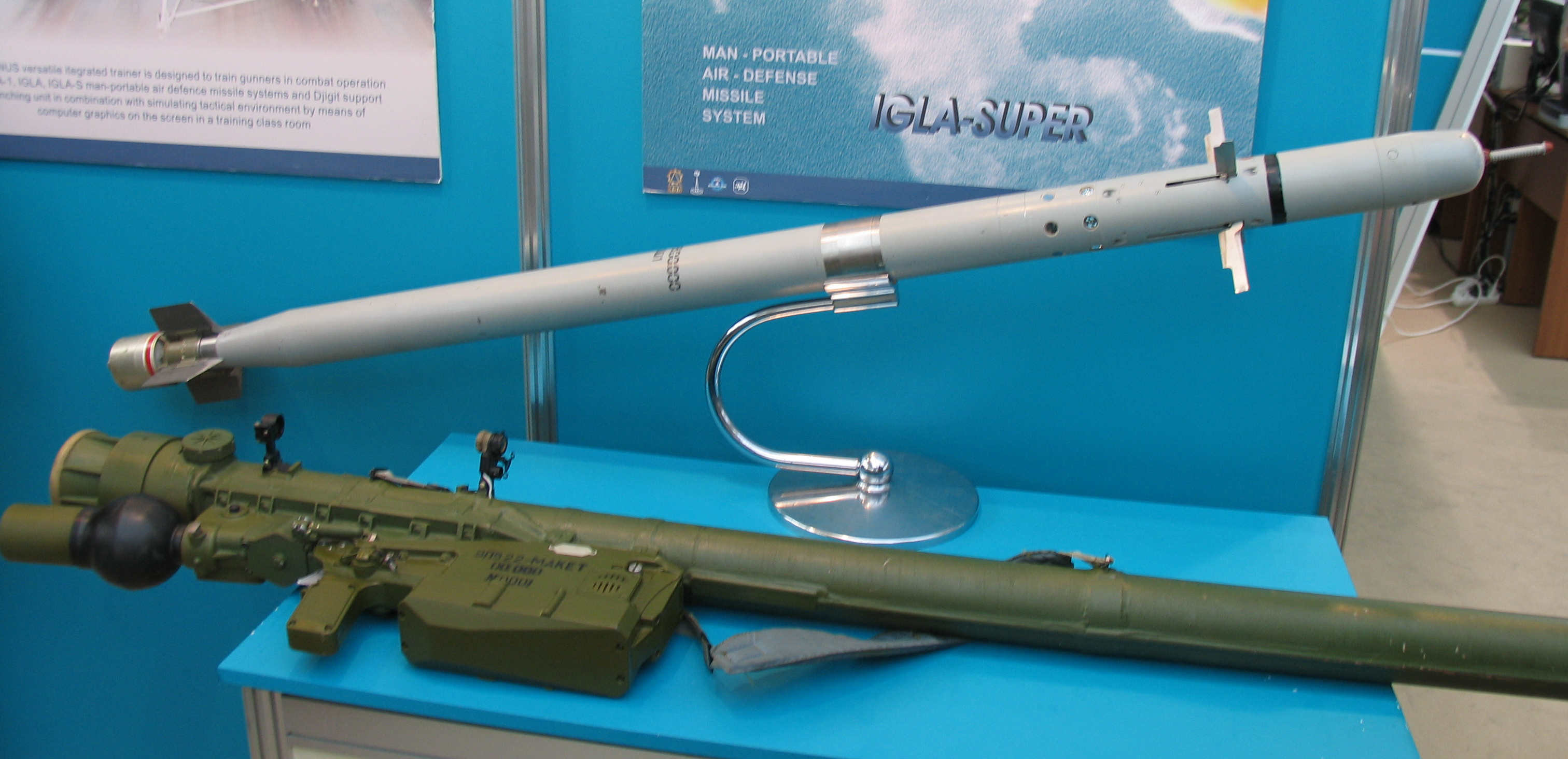
Examples of shoulder-launched surface-to-air missiles

The VE works by directing electromagnetic radiation; specifically, a set of high-frequency microwaves toward any projectile fired at an aircraft that is either taking off or landing. For example, if someone were to launch a shoulder-fired projectile or missile from outside the airport during an aircraft's takeoff, the VE airfield would detect the missile's presence and would shoot a microwave beam to deflect it from the airfield.

Vigilant Eagle consists of three major components: a missile detecting and tracking subsystem (MDT), a command and control system, and a scanning array. The MDT is a fixed grid of passive infrared (IR) cameras. The command and control system determines where the launch of the projectile is taking place. Using the scanning array, it can interfere with the MANPAD's guidance system and deflect it away from the aircraft.

== Potential benefits ==
The company claims that the system would offer much lower costs than other defense systems claiming $5-11 billion in savings if it were implemented at the 31 busiest U.S. airports.

Airline carriers prefer a ground-based system because it avoids the weight and cost of airplane-mounted systems.

== See also ==
- Area denial weapon, to prevent an adversary from occupying or traversing an area
- Directed-energy weapons
- Long Range Acoustic Device
- Missile defense
- Radiation
