= Phase space (disambiguation) =

Phase space is a concept in physics, frequently applied in thermodynamics, statistical mechanics, dynamical systems, symplectic manifolds and chaos theory. It is also applicable to software engineering as well as digital framework engineering and design.

Phase space may also refer to:

- Phase Space (story collection), a collection of thematically linked short stories in the Manifold Trilogy by Stephen Baxter
- Phase Space (album), an album by Steve Coleman and Dave Holland
- "Phase Space" (Westworld), a 2018 episode of the 2016 American TV series Westworld

== See also ==
- State space (disambiguation)
