= Hurricane (weapon) =

Chinese high-power microwave weapon

- Type: Directed-energy weapon
- Place of origin: China

The Hurricane (Chinese: 飓风, romanized: Jùfēng) is a series of high-power microwave (HPM) air defense systems developed by the China South Industries Group Corporation (CSGC) and marketed by Norinco.

== History ==
Two variants of the system, including Hurricane 2000 (Chinese: 飓风-2000) and Hurricane 3000 (Chinese: 飓风-3000), were unveiled by CSGC at the Zhuhai Airshow in November 2024.

The Hurricane 3000 was unveiled as part of the air defense equipment for the People's Liberation Army at the 2025 China Victory Day Parade.

== Variants ==
=== Hurricane 3000 ===
The Hurricane 3000 system features a large planar microwave array capable of emitting rapid electromagnetic pulses (EMP), a rotating fire-control radar, and an electro-optical system. The HPM system is credited with a quick response time, a wide area of effect that can neutralize multiple small drones and drone swarm, a low cost per shot for repetitive uses, and a non-lethal soft-kill capability that is suitable for urban combat and civilian infrastructure protection scenarios. The HPM system is also considered economically beneficial for targeting asymmetric threats.

The system reportedly has a radar detection range of 6 km (3.7 mi) agasint small drones, an electro-optical detection range of 4 km (2.5 mi), an effective damage range of 3 km (1.9 mi) for the microwave, a rated power of 2,000–3,500 MW (2,700,000–4,700,000 hp), an electron force of 80,000 eV (13,000 aJ), and gallium nitride (GaN) materials for enhanced microwave performance. The weapon system is mounted on an 8x8 Shaanxi SX2306 cross-country truck chassis, sharing its platform with CASIC's FK-4000 system. The Hurricane 3000 system was spotted in August 2025 during the preparation phase of the 2025 China Victory Day Parade in Beijing.

=== Hurricane 2000 ===
The Hurricane 2000 system is a smaller variant mounted on an 8×8 light armored vehicle chassis similar to that of the Type 625E air defense system. The weapon system includes a planar microwave array and rotating fire control radar for target detection and tracking. The Hurricane 2000 has an effective damage range of 2 km (1.2 mi).

== Operators ==
- China
  - People's Liberation Army Ground Force

== See also ==
- Epirus Leonidas
- FK-4000
- THOR (weapon)
- Radio Frequency Directed Energy Weapon
