= Stage =

Stage, stages, or staging may refer to:

== Arts and media ==
=== Acting ===
- Stage (theatre), a space for the performance of theatrical productions
- Theatre, a branch of the performing arts, often referred to as "the stage"
- The Stage, a weekly British theatre newspaper
- Stages Repertory Theatre, a theatre company in Houston, Texas

=== Music ===
==== Performers ====
- Stage, an American band featuring Ryan Star

==== Albums ====
- Stage (David Bowie album), 1978
- Stage (Great White album), 1995
- Stage (Keller Williams album), 2004
- Stage, by Mónica Naranjo, 2009
- The Stage (album), by Avenged Sevenfold, or the title song (see below), 2016
- Stages (Cassadee Pope album), 2019
- Stages (Elaine Paige album), 1983
- Stages (Eric Clapton album), 1993
- Stages (Jimi Hendrix album), 1991
- Stages (Josh Groban album), 2015
- Stages (Melanie C album), 2012
- Stages (Triumph album), 1985
- Stages (Vedera album), 2009
- Stages: The Lost Album, by Eric Andersen, 1991
- Stages: Performances 1970–2002, by Neil Diamond, 2003
- Stages, by David Benoit, 1982
- Stages, by the Electric Soft Parade, 2020
- Stages, by Ella Koon, 2008
- Stages, by Jill Vidal, 2022

==== Songs ====
- "Stage", by Live from Throwing Copper, 1994
- "The Stage" (song), by Avenged Sevenfold, 2016
- "Stages" (song), by ZZ Top, 1986
- "Stages", by Reks from Grey Hairs, 2008

=== Other uses in arts and media ===
- Stage (film), a 1951 Bollywood film
- Stage, a 2002 book and DVD documenting Britney Spears' Dream Within a Dream Tour
- Stage (TV series), an Iranian reality music competition
- The Stage (TV series), Indian talent television series
- Level (video gaming)
- Stages on Life's Way, an 1845 philosophical work by the Danish philosopher Søren Kierkegaard

== People with the surname ==
- Ruth Stage, British artist
- Wm. Stage (born 1951), American journalist, writer and photographer

== Science and technology ==
- Stage (hydrology), the water level in a river or stream with respect to a chosen reference height
- Stage (stratigraphy), a set of rock strata with the same age
- Staging (pathology) or cancer staging
- Stage, auxiliary breathing gas cylinder used in scuba diving
- Stage (stream gauge), a measurement of water level in a river, stream, pond, lake, or estuary
- The platform and that supports a slide in an optical microscope
- Linear stage, a component of precise motion system
- Calligra Stage, slide show presentation software
- One of the three stages or regions in the sociological theory of dramaturgy

== Transport ==
- Stagecoach
- Stage, a type of limousine

== Other uses ==
- Special stage (rallying), in rally racing
- The Stage (Antarctica), a moraine in Antarctica
- The Stage, Shoreditch, a mixed-use development
- Stage (bicycle race), a leg in a bicycle race
- Stage (cooking), a period of work experience in a kitchen
- Stage Stores Inc., an American department store company
- Stage, or apprenticeship
  - Stage, the training programme of the European Commission in Brussels and Luxembourg
- S.T.A.G.E., the Scientists, Technologists and Artists Generating Exploration program at the University of California, Santa Barbara

== See also ==
- Condition (disambiguation)
- Developmental stage theories
- Feeling
- Multistage rocket
- Period (disambiguation)
- Phase (disambiguation)
- Social role
