= FK-2000 =

Chinese surface-to-air missile system

The FK-2000 missile is a self-propelled, short to medium-range surface-to-air missile (SAM) system developed by China Aerospace Science and Industry Corporation (CASIC). The system was unveiled by CASIC at Zhuhai Airshow 2021.

== Description ==
The FK-2000 surface-to-air missile (SAM) system consists of a self-propelled air defense vehicle mounted on an 8x8 transporter chassis with an unmanned turret mounted on top. The missile is capable of targeting aircraft at a range of 1.2–25 km (0.75–15.53 mi) and cruise missiles at a range of 1.2–10 km (0.75–6.21 mi). A total of 12 missiles are mounted on the side of the turret with an independent elevation mechanism. The close-in air defense is provided by two 30 mm (1.2 in) six-barrel Gatling cannon, also with adjustable elevation. A search radar is mounted at the top-rear position of the turret, while the targeting radar is mounted at the front position. An optical/infrared tracking sight is also mounted as the auxiliary fire control.

== Operational history ==
The FK-2000 was not used by the People's Liberation Army, but it was exported to United Arab Emirates (UAE), which supplied the missile system to its regional allies, the Sudanese Rapid Support Forces (RSF) paramilitary force and armed forces of Chad.

In September 2025, Rapid Support Forces claimed that the force used the FK-2000 to shoot down a Bayraktar Akıncı unmanned aerial vehicle, the first evidence confirming the FK-2000 was deployed with RSF.

In November 2025, a Sudanese military IL-76 was shot down by the RSF FK-2000.

In February 2026, Sudanese military claimed that it has destroyed a FK-2000 operated by Rapid Support Forces in a strike in the Ed Dubeibat area of South Kordofan.

In July 2026, Emirati military deployed FK-2000 in Manama coast, Bahrain against Iranian threats posed during 2026 Iran War.

== Operators ==
- Chad
- Ethiopia
- Sudan
- United Arab Emirates
- Turkmenistan

== See also ==
- Pantsir missile system
- FK-3000
- HQ-17
- HQ-11
- List of surface-to-air missiles
