= Phaser =

Phaser may refer to:

- Raytheon Phaser, a directed-energy weapon
- Phaser (fictional weapon), a gun in the Star Trek universe
- Phaser (effect), in electronics, an audio signal processor used to phase-shift the signal
- Light Phaser, a lightgun for the Master System console
- Xerox Phaser, a brand of printers
- Personnel Halting and Stimulation Response rifle (PHASR), a dazzler weapon
- Phaser, an insecticide containing the active ingredient endosulfan
- Phaser Digital Power Transducer from Second Wind
- Phaser (band), a Washington, D.C. rock band
- Phaser (game framework), HTML5 game creation framework

== See also ==
- Phase (disambiguation)
- Phasor (disambiguation)
- FASOR (disambiguation)
