= Phase 5 =

Phase 5, Phase V or Phase Five may refer to:

- Marvel Cinematic Universe: Phase Five, an in-development group of superhero films and television series
- Phase5, a hardware manufacturer for the Amiga computer
- Deployment phase 5, a final deployment phase of a U.S. Marine Corps reconnaissance force
- Pandemic phase 5, the second highest level of a pandemic alert
- Phase 5, Mohali, a residential area of Mohali, Punjab
- Phase Five (2020), an extended play from Ida Laurberg
