= Bofors HPM Blackout =

Microwave directed-energy weapon

Bofors HPM Blackout is a high-powered microwave weapon system, built by BAE Systems, which is stated to be able to destroy at distance a wide variety of commercial off-the-shelf (COTS) electronic equipment. It is stated to be non-lethal to humans. The total weight of the weapon system is less than 500 kg.
