= FK-3000 =

Chinese surface-to-air missile system

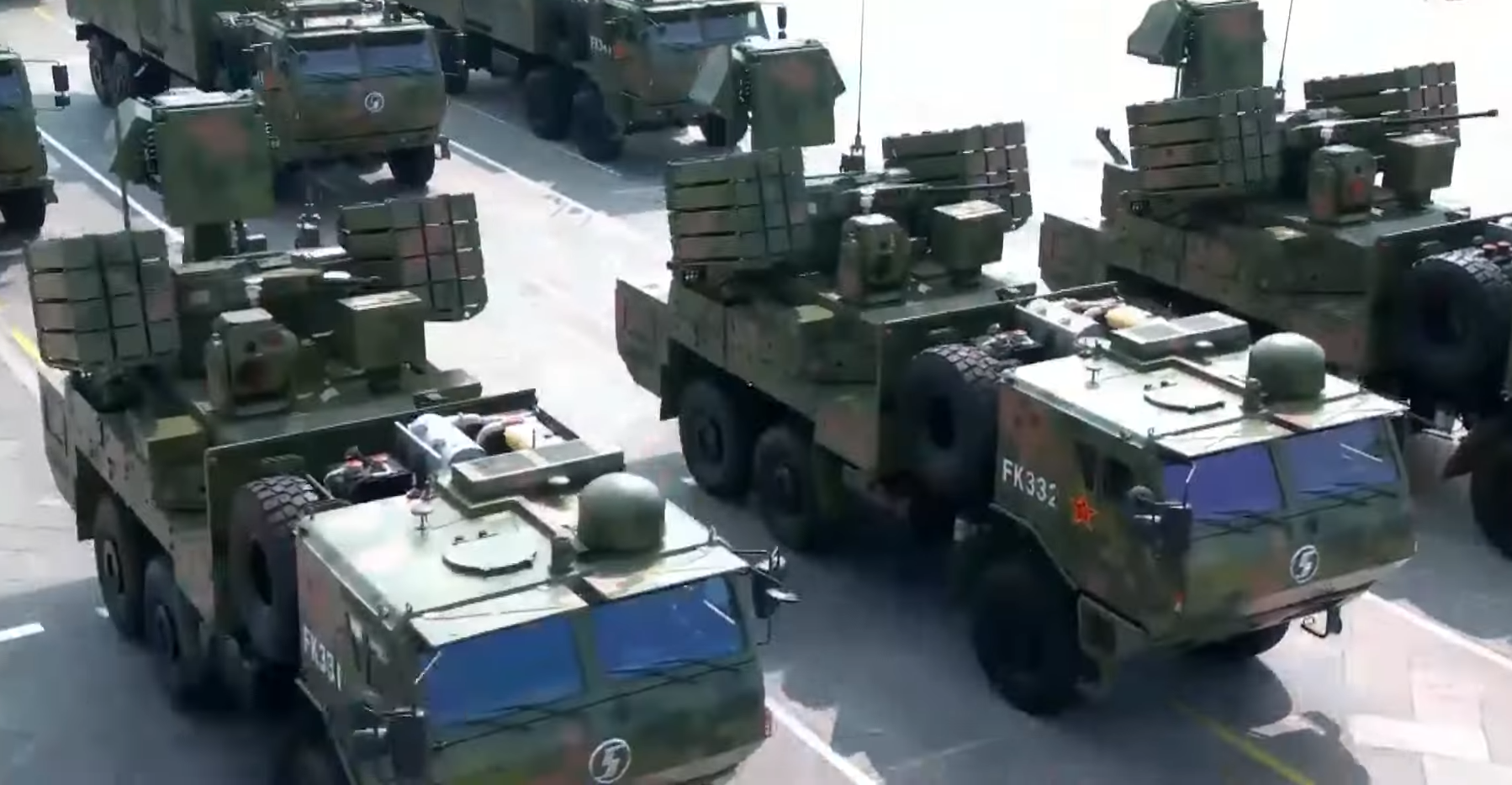
FK-3000 at the 2025 China Victory Day Parade

The FK-3000 missile is a self-propelled, anti-cluster, anti-drone swarm, anti-ammunition, air-defence surface-to-air missile (SAM) system developed by China Aerospace Science and Industry Corporation (CASIC). The system was unveiled by CASIC at Zhuhai Airshow 2022.

== Description ==
The FK-3000 surface-to-air missile (SAM) system is mounted on a 6x6 SX2220 high-mobility truck platform. The chassis is mounted with an unmanned turret, an autocannon, a search radar, a tracking radar, a radio-jamming transmitter, and an optical fire-control system. The system can carry two types of interceptors, an anti-ammunition air-defence missile and an anti-cluster (anti-drone swarm) mini-missile.

At the Zhuhai Airshow 2022, the system on display mounted six large missiles and 48 smaller missiles. In August 2025, a variant in People's Liberation Army service only mounted the smaller interceptor, for 96 missiles in total. The high amount of interceptors and the autocannon would give the FK-3000 system much better magazine depth to deal with drone swarms.

The two types of missiles fitted on the FK-3000 are designed for separate purposes. The anti-air missile is specialized for engaging aircraft, missiles, and land attack ammunition. The smaller micro missiles are designed for taking out drones and cluster targets. The radio-jamming transmitter also works in tandem with the missiles to neutralize remotely controlled drones. With the autocannons, radio jammers, and missiles, the vehicle forms a multi-layered air defense network capable of engaging targets ranging from small quadcopters to fixed-wing drones. The engagement range of the FK-3000 system is 30–12,000 m (98–39,370 ft).

Aside from the main vehicle (master vehicle), the system can slave two ground robotic vehicles, which are named the FK-3000 auxiliary launching vehicles. The auxiliary vehicles are optional. Each FK-3000 auxiliary vehicle is fitted with an optical sight system and can also carry 24 micro missiles.

== Operators ==
- People's Republic of China

== See also ==
- FK-2000
- FK-4000
