= FASOR =

Fasor or FASOR may refer to:

- Frequency addition source of optical radiation
- Forward Air Spring Operated Return, a part of a paintball gun

See also:

- Phase (disambiguation)
- Phaser (disambiguation)
- Phasor (disambiguation)
