= Phase 5, Mohali =

Residential area of Mohali, Punjab

Phase 5(Sector 59) is a residential area of Mohali, Punjab.

== Restaurants ==
- Maihaan Punjabi Cuisine Restaurant.
- The Brew Master
- Khalsa Vaishno Dhabha
- Barbeque Nation
- Yo!China
- Domino's Pizza
- Pizza Hut
- Mr Rooster
- Punjabi Haveli
- Republic of Chicken
- Cafe Coffee Day

== Banks ==
- Axis Bank
- Punjab and Sind Bank
- Bank of Baroda
