= Jürgen Fuchs (writer) =

East German writer (1950–1999)

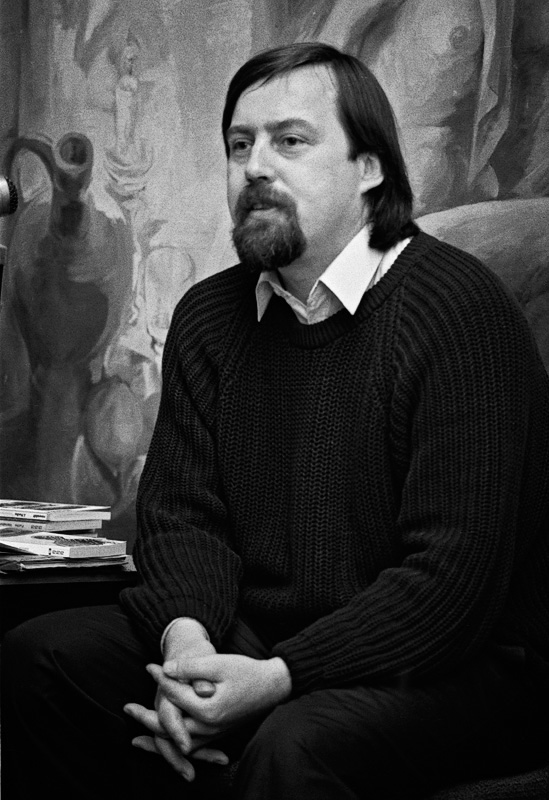
Jürgen Fuchs in 1990

Jürgen Fuchs (19 December 1950 – 9 May 1999) was an East German writer and dissident.

== Biography ==
Jürgen Fuchs was born and raised in Reichenbach im Vogtland. After his military service, he began to study social psychology at the University of Jena in 1971. In 1973, he joined the Socialist Unity Party of Germany (SED), the ruling party of East Germany in order to study the system from inside. At the same time he published dissident poems and prose. This led to his forceful disenrollment from the university shortly before graduation and his expulsion from the Socialist Unity Party of Germany in 1975.

Prior to this, Fuchs married his wife Lieselotte in 1974. His daughter Lili was born in 1975 in Jena. In the summer of 1975 the family moved to Berlin where Fuchs became a social worker in a church charity, one of the few work options for a political dissident. Following his protest against the deprivation of East German citizenship of Wolf Biermann, he was arrested 19 November 1976. Fuchs spent 9 months in prison of the East German secret service Stasi in Berlin-Hohenschönhausen (but he was not sentenced until 1982). Following international protests, Fuchs was released from prison and deported to West Berlin together with his family in August 1977.

Fuchs was a victim of the Stasi's Zersetzung techniques, which he described as "an assault on the human soul".

After his arrival in West Berlin, he published protocols of his detention and he continued to be a target for the Stasi. In the early 1980s, Fuchs became involved in the peace movement. After the opening of the Berlin Wall in 1989 and German unification in 1990, Fuchs was an activist in the clarification of the Stasi crimes.

He died of plasmacytoma, a rare form of leukemia, in 1999 in Berlin. His disease may have been caused by deliberate exposure to ionizing radiation by the Stasi during his imprisonment.
