= For Love of the Game (disambiguation) =

For the Love of the Game may refer to:

- For Love of the Game (film), 1999 American sports drama film with Kevin Costner
- For Love of the Game, novel by Pulitzer Prize-winning author Michael Shaara, published posthumously in 1991
- For the Love of the Game (album), 2008 album by Christian metal group Pillar
