= Phase 3 =

Phase 3, Phase III or Phase Three may refer to:

== Media ==
- Marvel Cinematic Universe: Phase Three, eleven American superhero films from 2016–2019
- Phase 3: Thrones and Dominions, a 1995 album by Earth
- Phase III (album), a 1972 album by the Osmonds
- Phase Three (album), a 2003 album by the Riverdales

== Other ==
- MediaWiki's unofficial name during 2002 until 2003
- Phase III clinical trials, the third of the phases of clinical research
- Phase 3 Eclipse, an American ultralight aircraft
- Phase 3 Productions
- Phase 3 metro station
- Phase III Offensive
