= Phase II =

Phase II, Phase 2 or Phase Two may refer to:

== Media ==
- Marvel Cinematic Universe: Phase Two, six American superhero films from 2013–2015
- Star Trek: Phase II, an unrealized television series based on the characters of Gene Roddenberry's Star Trek
- Star Trek: Phase II (fan series), a fan-created science fiction series set in the Star Trek universe
- Phase II (album), 2012 Prince Royce album
- Phase 2 (album), 2014 Fear, and Loathing in Las Vegas album
- Phase II, a Johnny Smith album
- Phase II Pan Groove, a steel orchestra
- Contracted: Phase II, a 2015 horror film
- Phase Two: Slowboat to Hades, a Gorillaz compilation DVD

== Other ==
- Phase II clinical trials, the second of the phases of clinical research
- Phase II metabolism, conjugation reactions in drug metabolism
- Phase 2 (graffiti artist) (1955–2019), an American graffiti artist in New York City
- Phase2 International, a defunct cloud computing provider
- Cosmos Phase II, a series of hang gliders
- Phase 2 metro station
- MediaWiki software, formerly named Phase II Software
