= State space (disambiguation) =

A state space is a discrete space considered in computer science.

It may also refer to:

- Configuration space (physics)
- Phase space
- Quantum state space
- State-space representation (control theory)
