= Phase 4 =

Phase 4, Phase IV or Phase Four may refer to:

== Media ==
- Marvel Cinematic Universe: Phase Four, a group of superhero films and television series from 2021–2022
- Phase IV (1974 film), a science-fiction horror film directed Saul Bass
- Phase IV (2002 film), a Canadian action-thriller film directed by Bryan Goeres
- Phase IV (album), a 1982 album by Art Zoyd
- Phase-4, a character in Dead or Alive 5 Ultimate

== Other ==
- Phase IV clinical trial, the fourth of the phases of clinical research
- Phase 4 Films, a Canadian film distribution company
- Phase 4 Stereo, record label and recording process
- Four-Phase Systems, a computer company
- Four-phase logic, is a type of, and design methodology for dynamic logic
