= Phasor (radio broadcasting) =

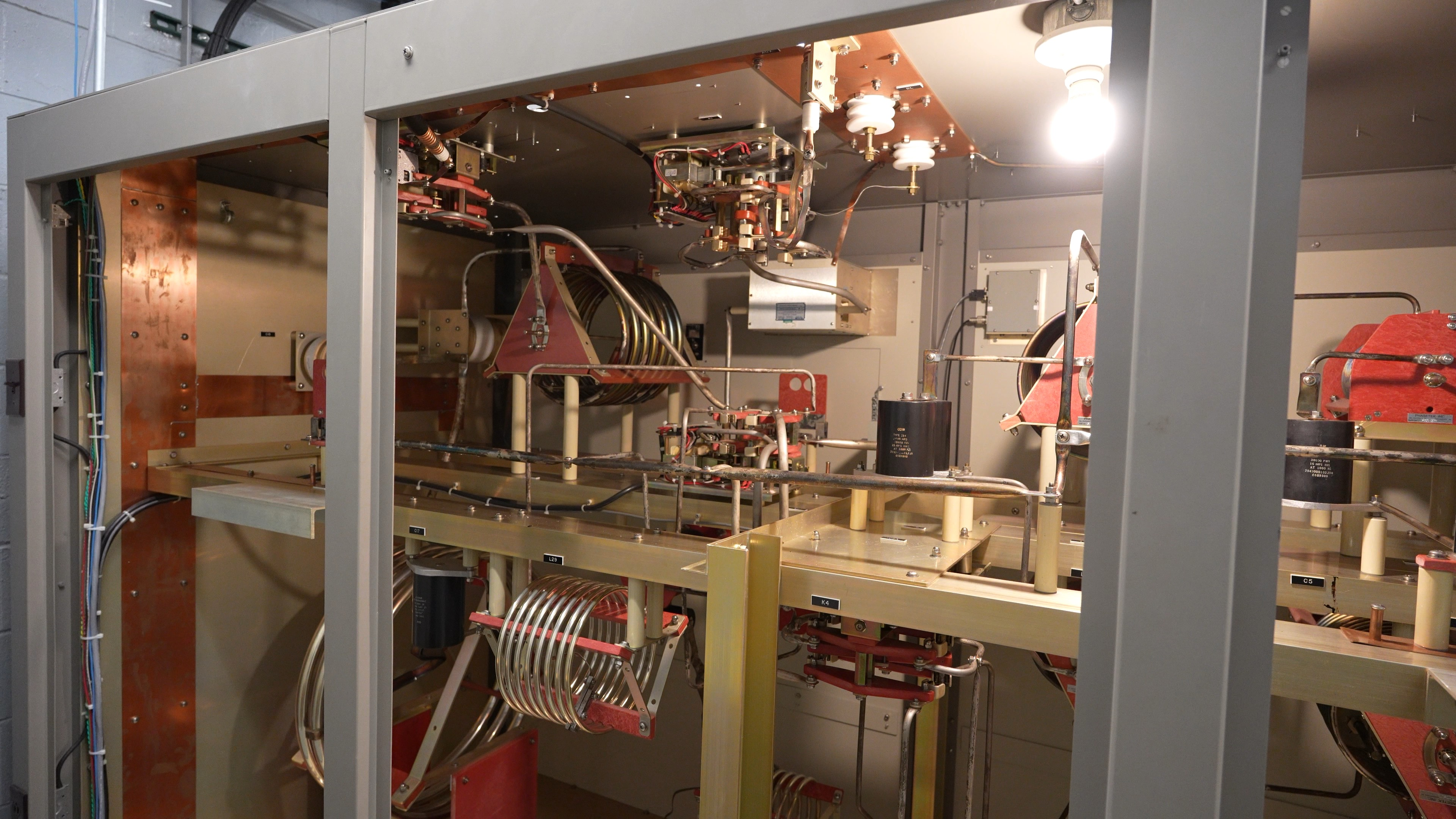
The inside of a phasor cabinet at an AM broadcast site.

A phasor is a network of capacitors and variable inductors used to adjust the relative amplitude and phase of the current being distributed to each tower in a directional array. A typical phasor has separate controls to adjust the phase of the current going to each tower, adjustable power divider controls, and a common point impedance matching network to adjust the system input impedance to 50 ohms with no reactance without disturbing the phase or amplitude of the tower currents.
