= Faze (band) =

American soul band (1980s-1990s)

- Origin: Miami, Florida, United States
- Labels: Cyntone, Bahia, RCA, Urban Sterling Entertainment, Grand Avenue
- Past members: Dave Johnson; Edward Faison; Robert Wright; Fernandez Cherry; Wayne Morrison

Faze was an American soul band of the 1980s and early 1990s from Miami, Florida. The band comprised Dave Johnson, Edward Faison, Robert Wright, Fernandez Cherry, and Wayne Morrison.

Their discography includes the albums Faze 1 (1989), Love Games (1991), Love Affairs (1995), and Cold Sweat Again (1997).

The group's "Cold Sweat" single charted twice on the Billboard Top R&B/Hip Hop Singles chart, peaking at no. 61 in 1989 and at no. 94 in 1991.

The group were described as "urban contemporary" and "dance-pop" by Allmusic reviewer Ron Wynn.

== Discography ==
=== Albums ===
- Faze 1 (1989), Cyntone
- Love Games (1991), Bahia/RCA
- Love Affairs (1995), Urban Sterling Entertainment
- Cold Sweat Again (1997), Grand Avenue

=== Singles ===
- "When You Were Mine" (1989), Cyntone
- "Cold Sweat" (1989), Cyntone
- "Cold Sweat" (1991), Bahia
- "That's What I'm Here For" (1991), Bahia
- "The Things You Do" (1991), Bahia
- "Keep It Goin'" (1995), Grand Avenue
