= Raytheon Phaser =

Directed-energy weapon

The Raytheon Phaser is a directed-energy weapon developed by Raytheon Technologies that uses high-power microwave electromagnetic radiation to destroy hostile drones, which technically makes it a maser rather than a phaser. The system uses vacuum tube technology to generate the radiated power and uses a reflector antenna to generate a conical beam, giving it the ability to destroy multiple drones at once at short range.
