= Counter-electronics High Power Microwave Advanced Missile Project =

CHAMP
- Type: counter-electronics directed energy weapon (experimental)
- Place of origin: United States

Production history
- Manufacturer: Boeing Defense, Space & Security

The Counter-electronics High Power Microwave Advanced Missile Project (CHAMP) is a joint concept technology demonstration led by the Air Force Research Laboratory, Directed Energy Directorate at Kirtland Air Force Base to develop an air-launched directed-energy weapon capable of incapacitating or damaging electronic systems by means of an EMP (electromagnetic pulse).

== Development ==
On October 22, 2012, Boeing announced a successful test of the missile. CHAMP disabled seven different targets before self-destructing over empty desert.

The U.S. Air Force expected to have technology for a steerable counter-electronics weapon “available” in 2016, when a multi-shot, multi-target, high-power microwave (HPM) package would be tested aboard an AGM-86 ALCM. By the mid-2020s, HPM weapons are expected to be integrated onto a "JASSM-ER-type weapon," and on small reusable platforms like the F-35 Lightning II and unmanned aerial vehicles. HPM weapons may be desired in situations where one target building needs to be engaged and shut down, while not affecting the buildings around it. Other potential improvements could include increasing autonomy and putting it on hypersonic missiles.

The CHAMP is unique among electronic warfare weapons because it does not affect human targets and has very low collateral damage potential. Congress has suggested repurposing excess cruise missiles demilitarized under the Intermediate-Range Nuclear Forces Treaty to turn them into CHAMP weapons without violating it. On 14 May 2015, the Air Force nominated the Lockheed Martin JASSM-ER as the optimal air vehicle to carry the CHAMP payload. CHAMP is capable of up to 100 shots per sortie.

In May 2019, it was revealed the Air Force had deployed at least 20 CHAMP-equipped missiles.

== Ground-based ==
In 2013, Raytheon demonstrated a ground-based air defense high-powered microwave system derived from CHAMP technology, disabling electronics on small UAVs. The demonstrator resembles the active denial system non-lethal crowd control device, including its reflector and steering mirror. It is integrated with radar automated tracking. Services and agencies have expressed interest in the technology to disable small UAVs infringing on sensitive sites. Although the current prototype measures 6 m (19.7 ft), the company has designed a system half the size that can deliver the same capability.

== Successor ==
The AFRL and Office of Naval Research will conduct tests during summer 2022 of the High-Powered Joint Electromagnetic Non-Kinetic Strike Weapon (HiJENKS), a successor to the CHAMP using smaller and more rugged HPM technology that can be integrated on a wider range of carrier systems.
