= List of tallest buildings in Gurgaon =

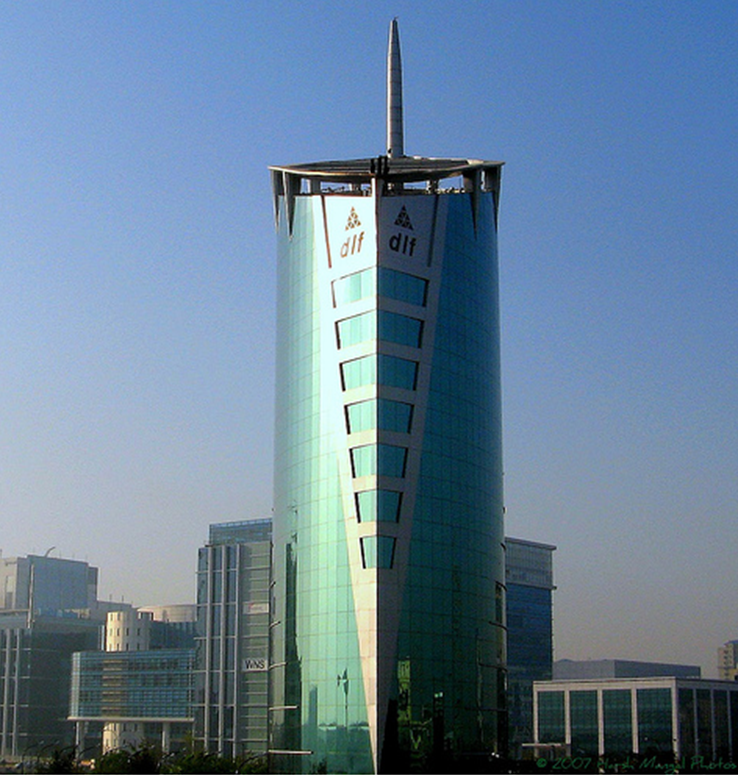
Gateway Towers, Gurgaon

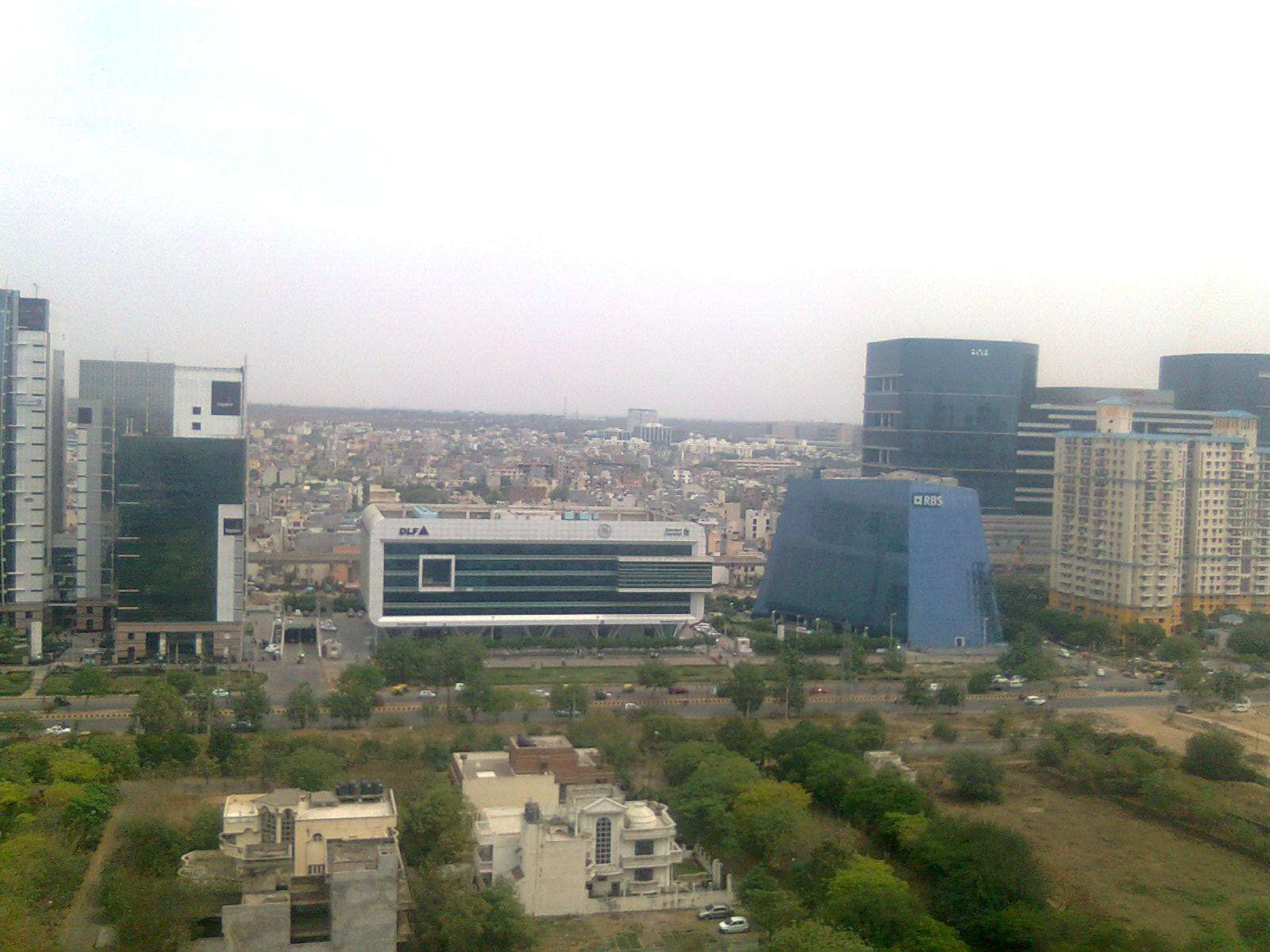
Gurgaon's skyline

This is a list of the tallest buildings in Gurgaon, in the northern Indian state of Haryana. Gurgaon is one of the fastest-growing cities in the Delhi NCR as well as in India.

Gurgaon's economic growth started in the 1970s when Maruti Suzuki India Limited established a manufacturing plant and gathered pace after General Electric established its business outsourcing operations in the city in collaboration with real-estate firm DLF. New Gurgaon, Manesar and Sohna serve as adjoining manufacturing and real estate hubs for Gurgaon. Despite being India's 56th largest city in terms of population, Gurgaon is the 8th largest city in the country in terms of total wealth. Gurgaon serves as the headquarters of many of India's largest companies, is home to thousands of startup companies and has local offices for more than 250 Fortune 500 companies. It accounts for almost 70% of the total annual economic investments in Haryana state, which has helped it become a leading hub for high-tech industry in northern India, and the city is experiencing huge construction boom in real estate and commercial sector with hundreds of under construction projects.

Gurgaon's skyline with its many skyscrapers is nationally recognised, and the city has been home to several tall buildings with modern planning. Gurgaon has around 14 skyscrapers and 1,892 high-rises already constructed.

Trump Towers Delhi NCR Towers 1 & 2 topped out in 2024, and are currently the tallest buildings in Gurgaon at 201.53 metres (661 ft) and 55 floors.

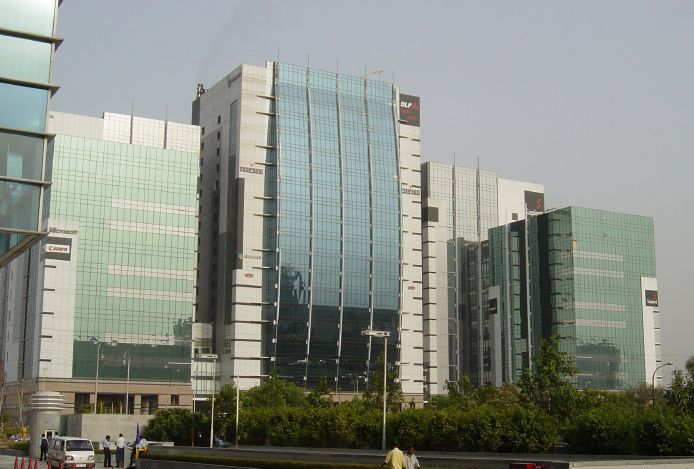
Cyber Green Hub Building

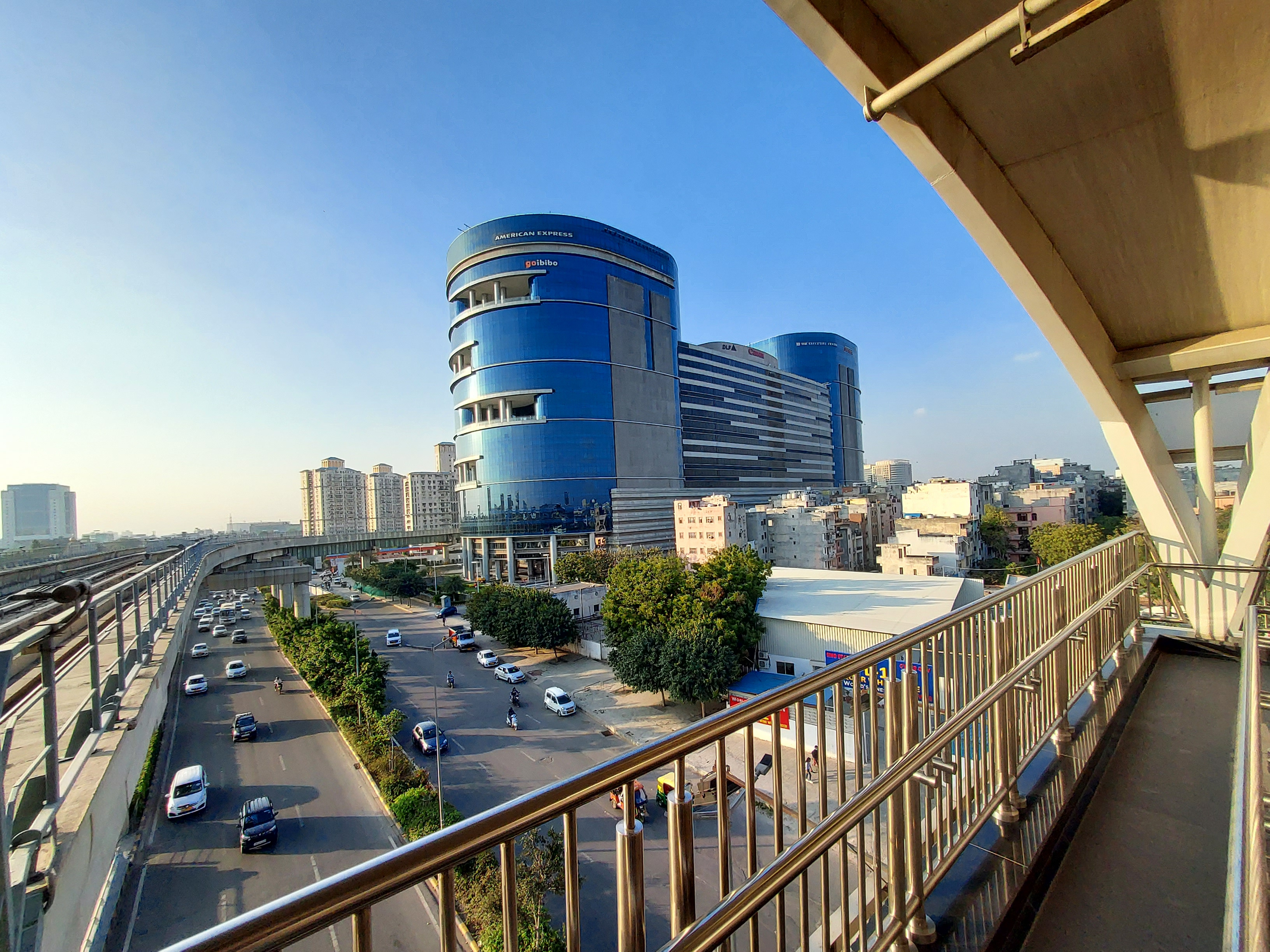
DLF Epitome Tower

== Tallest buildings ==
This list ranks the tallest completed and topped out buildings in Gurgaon that stand at least 100 m (328 ft) as of May 2024. This includes spires and architectural details but does not include antenna masts.

Rank	Name	Image	Location	Height	Floors	Year	Building type
1	Trump Towers Delhi NCR (T-1)		Gurugram Sec-65	201.53 metres (661 ft)	55	2024	Residential + Commercial
1	Trump Towers Delhi NCR (T-2)		Gurugram Sec-65	201.53 metres (661 ft)	55	2024	Residential + Commercial
3	M3M IFC		Gurugram Sec-66	199.3 metres (654 ft)	43	2023	Commercial
4	Raheja Revanta		Gurugram Sec-78	199.05 metres (653 ft)	60	2020(Topped-Out)	Residential
5	IREO Victory Valley Tower A		Gurugram Sec-67	178 metres (584 ft)	51	2015	Residential
6	Paras Quartier		Sec-2, Gwal Pahri, Gurgaon-Faridabad Road	173 metres (568 ft)	43	2019	Residential
7	M3M 65th Avenue (Tower 4/5)		Gurugram Sec-66	161 metres (528 ft)	47	2024	Residential + Commercial
8	M3M 65th Avenue (Tower 2/3)		Gurugram Sec-66	161 metres (528 ft)	47	2024	Residential + Commercial
9	M3M Latitude		Gurugram Sec-66	157 metres (515 ft)	43	2021	Residential
10	DLF Camellias		Gurugram Sec-42	157 metres (515 ft)	40	2017	Residential
11	Ireo Victory Valley (B)		Gurugram Sec-67	155 metres (509 ft)	45	2015	Residential
12	M3M Golfestate T9		Gurugram Sec-67	153 metres (502 ft)	42	2018	Residential
13	Ireo Victory Valley (C)		Gurugram Sec-67	151 metres (482 ft)	40	2015	Residential
14	DLF The Crest (3 Towers)		Gurugram Sec-54	147 metres (482 ft)	38	2017	Residential
15	Ireo Skyon		Gurugram Sec-60	140 metres (459 ft)	39	2018	Residential
16	Grand View Tower		Gurugram Sec-58	137 metres (449 ft)	30	2019	Commercial
17	TATA Primanti (T7)		Gurugram Sec-72	135 metres (443 ft)	40	2016	Residential
18	TATA Primanti (T1)		Gurugram Sec-72	135 metres (443 ft)	40	2016	Residential
19	TATA Primanti (T2)		Gurugram Sec-72	135 metres (443 ft)	40	2016	Residential
19	Grand Hyatt		Gurugram Sec-58	135 metres (443 ft)	27	2019	Hotel + Commercial
19	Paras Quartier B		Sec-2, Gwal Pahri, Gurgaon-Faridabad Road	135 metres (443 ft)	37	2018	Residential
22	Pioneer Park(5 Towers)		Gurugram Sec-61	125 metres (410 ft)	33	2020	Residential
23	M3M St. Andrews		Gurugram Sec-65	125 metres (410 ft)	35	2019	Residential
24	Pioneer Araya(3 Towers)		Gurugram Sec-62	125 metres (410 ft)	35	2016	Residential
25	GYS Vision Tower(3 Towers)		Gurugram Sec-113	120 metres (394 ft)	27	2017	Commercial
26	DLF The Belaire(6 Towers)		Gurugram Sec-53	120 metres (394 ft)	30	2010	Residential
27	Mapsko Mount Ville		Gurugram Sec-79	120 metres (394 ft)	37	2017	Residential
28	M3M Corner Walk		Gurugram Sec-74	120 metres (394 ft)	27	2024	Residential + Commercial
29	DLF Park Place(11 Towers)		Gurugram Sec-54	120 metres (394 ft)	30	2014	Residential
30	M3M Merlin (T7)		Gurugram Sec-61	115 metres (377 ft)	34	2016	Residential
31	DLF The Primus(4 Towers)		Gurugram Sec-82	110 metres (361 ft)	32	2016	Commercial
32	DLF Ultima(5 Towers)		Gurugram Sec-81	105 metres (344 ft)	29	2019	Residential
33	Mahindra Luminare(2 Towers)		Gurugram Sec-58	103 metres (338 ft)	31	2018	Residential
34	M3M Broadway		Gurugram Sec-71	100 metres (328 ft)	27	2024	Commercial
35	Ireo Grand Arch(4 Towers)		Gurugram Sec-58	100 metres (328 ft)	30	2014	Residential

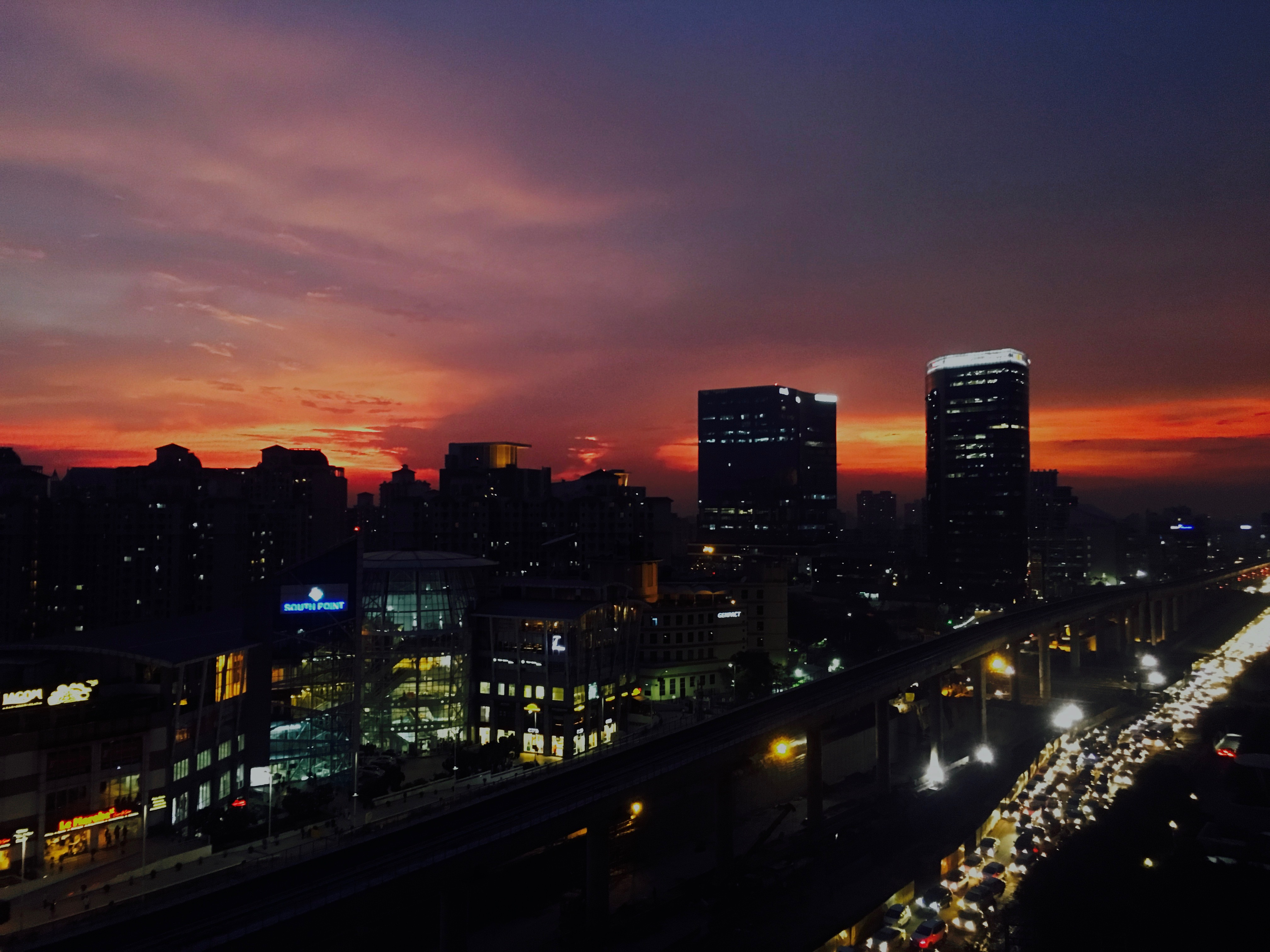
Gurgaon's Skyline at Dusk.

== Tallest Skyscrapers Under Construction and Launched ==
This list ranks buildings that are under construction and launched in Gurgaon that are planned to rise at least 150 m (490 ft). This includes spires and architectural details but does not include antenna masts.

The Height/Floors Ratio may differ between different projects as some buildings are being built upon Podiums/Clubs or Commercial Spaces.

Total Number of skyscrapers Under Construction and Launched: 174

Sr	Name	Area	Height	Floors	No. of Towers	Expected year of completion	Category	Notes
1	Ganga Anantam	Gurugram Sec-85 28.406187°N 76.951876°E	215 metres (705 ft)	60	3 Towers	2028	High-end Luxury	Tallest Towers Under Construction in Gurgaon
2	Trump Residences	Gurugram Sec-69 28.397722°N 77.042476°E	200 metres (656 ft)	51	2 Towers	2033	Highest-end Luxury	Second Trump Towers Project in the City
3	DLF Privana North	Gurugram Sec-77 28.387665°N 76.992973°E	194.5 metres (638 ft)	50	6 Towers	2033	Highest-end Luxury	
4	Bignonia Towers T1	Sohna Sec-33 28.286898°N 77.078990°E	193.8 metres (636 ft)	48	1 Tower	2031	Highest-end Luxury	
5	Signature Global Twin Towers DXP	Gurugram Sec-84 28.414627°N 76.961713°E	191.5 metres (628 ft)	45	2 Towers	2032	High-end Luxury	
6	Anant Raj The Estate One - Tower C	Sector 63A Gurugram	188.5 metres	50	1 Tower	2032	High-end luxury	
7	MVN AeroOne	Gurugram Sec-37D 28.438188°N 76.961861°E	180 metres (591 ft)	40	1 Tower	2032	High-end Luxury	
8	Satya Levante 104	Gurugram Sec-104 28.474894°N 76.988687°E	176 metres (577 ft)	43	3 Towers	2033	Highest-end Luxury	
9	Experion The Trillion	Gurugram Sec-42 28.426788°N 77.035042°E	175 metres (574 ft)	45	3 Towers	2032	High-end Luxury	
10	PYRAMID Alban	Gurugram Sec-71 28.404948°N 77.018865°E	173 metres (568 ft)	46	3 Towers	2032	Luxury	
11	Pioneer Alura T1	Gurugram Sec-62 28.413699°N 77.089539°E	171 metres (561 ft)	38	1 Tower	2034	Highest-end Luxury	
12	Max Estate 361	Gurugram Sec-36a 28.420768°N 76.970354°E	170 metres (558 ft)	47	4 Towers	2032	Highest-end Luxury	
13	Pioneer Alura T2	Gurugram Sec-62 28.413699°N 77.089539°E	169 metres (554 ft)	40	1 Tower	2034	Highest-end Luxury	
14	Ganga Nandaka	Gurugram Sec-84 28.405347°N 76.963461°E	168 metres (551 ft)	45	4 Towers	2031	High-end Luxury	
15	Whiteland Westin Residences	Gurugram Sec-103 28.484403°N 76.985820°E	167 metres (548 ft)	44	11 Towers	2032	Highest-end Luxury	
16	Smartworld Sky Arc	Gurugram Sec-69 28.399429°N 77.041720°E	165 metres (541 ft)	42	6 Towers	2032	High-end Luxury	
17	Signature Global Titanium (Phase 1)	Gurugram Sec-71 28.411298°N 77.023216°E	165 metres (541 ft)	40	7 Towers	2032	Highest-end Luxury	
18	TARC Ishva T5	Gurugram Sec-63 28.392747°N 77.084827°E	165 metres (541 ft)	44	1 Tower	2032	Highest-end Luxury	
19	DLF Privana West	Gurugram Sec-76 28.384946°N 76.989674°E	164 metres (538 ft)	41	5 Towers	2030	Highest-end Luxury	
20	Whiteland Aspen Iconic	Gurugram Sec-76 28.395973°N 76.989537°E	163 metres (535 ft)	42	1 Tower	2028	Highest-end Luxury	
21	Adani The Marq	Gurugram Sector 102	163 metres (535 ft)	42	2 Towers	2030	Highest-end Luxury	https://haryanarera.gov.in/view_project/project_preview_open/3890
22	AIPL Lake City (Riviera)	Gurugram Sec-103 28.505564°N 76.982220°E	162 metres (531 ft)	46	2 Towers	2033	Highest-end Luxury	
23	TARC Ishva T3	Gurugram Sec-63 28.392747°N 77.084827°E	161 metres (528 ft)	43	1 Tower	2032	Highest-end Luxury	
24	TARC Ishva T4	Gurugram Sec-63 28.392747°N 77.084827°E	161 metres (528 ft)	43	1 Tower	2032	Highest-end Luxury	
25	BPTP Downtown 66	Gurugram Sec-66 28.393266°N 77.058786°E	161 metres (528 ft)	46	3 Towers	2033	High-end Luxury	
26	Birla Arika	Gurugram Sec-31 28.450810°N 77.046271°E	160 metres (525 ft)	41	7 Towers	2030	Highest-end Luxury	
27	Whiteland Aspen One	Gurugram Sec-76 28.392624°N 76.991746°E	160 metres (525 ft)	42	2 Towers	2031	High-end Luxury	
28	4S The Aurrum	Gurugram Sec-59 28.400828°N 77.108191°E	160 metres (525 ft)	41	5 Towers	2032	High-end Luxury	
29	Landmark Skyvue	Gurugram Sec-103 28.488931°N 76.993247°E	160 metres (525 ft)	42	2 Towers	2032	Luxury	
30	DLF Privana South	Gurugram Sec-77 28.379314°N 76.989874°E	160 metres (525 ft)	41	7 Towers	2030	Highest-end Luxury	
31	Elevate Reserve	Gurugram Sec-62 28.409919°N 77.090364°E	159 metres (522 ft)	44	2 Towers	2030	High-end Luxury	
32	Krisumi Waterfall Suites 2 T6	Gurugram Sec-36a 28.418575°N 76.971925°E	157 metres (515 ft)	46	1 Tower	2032	Luxury	
33	BPTP Amstoria Verti-Greens	Gurugram Sec-102 28.471718°N 76.973609°E	156 metres (512 ft)	45	5 Towers	2032	High-end Luxury	
34	BPTP Gaia Residences	Gurugram Sec-102 28.472335°N 76.971948°E	156 metres (512 ft)	45	3 Towers	2032	High-end Luxury	
35	Hero Palatial A	Gurugram Sec-104 28.485838°N 76.994245°E	156 metres (512 ft)	43	1 Tower	2032	Luxury	
36	Anant Raj The Estate One - Tower D	Gurugram Sec - 63 A	155.5 metres (511 ft)	40	1 Tower	2032	High End Luxury	
37	Central Park DXP	Gurugram Sec-104 28.475834°N 76.983227°E	155 metres (509 ft)	39	4 Towers	2032	Luxury	Tower is 144m till last habitable floor and total height is 155m as seen in RERA
38	SmartWorld The Edition	Gurugram Sec-66 28.400435°N 77.057716°E	155 metres (509 ft)	41	6 Towers	2031	Highest-end Luxury	Tower has a floor to ceiling height of 3.45m and 44 floors (G+2B+42)
39	Bignonia Towers T2	Sohna Sec-33 28.286759°N 77.077672°E	155 metres (509 ft)	38	1 Tower	2031	Highest-end Luxury	
40	Signature Global Sarvam	Gurugram Sec-37D 28.454434°N 76.967192°E	155 metres (509 ft)	41	11 Towers	2033	Luxury	
41	Trinity Sky Palazzos	Gurugram Sec-88b 28.440126°N 76.949187°E	154 metres (505 ft)	40	6 Towers	2032	High-end Luxury	
42	Hero Palatial D	Gurugram Sec-104 28.485838°N 76.994245°E	153 metres (502 ft)	43	1 Tower	2032	Luxury	
43	Tulip The Melrose	Gurugram Sec-70 28.395156°N 77.017199°E	152.85 metres (501 ft)	39	4 Towers	2032	Luxury	
44	Elan The Statement	Gurugram Sec-49 28.408612°N 77.043887°E	152.3 metres (500 ft)	37	5 Towers	2033	Highest-end Luxury	
45	Dalcore the Falcon	Gurugram Sec-53 28.449138°N 77.087339°E	152 metres (499 ft)	38	1 Tower	2031	Highest-end Luxury	
46	Sobha Aranya T4	Gurugram Sec-80 28.371899°N 76.957980°E	152 metres (499 ft)	46	1 Tower	2031	Highest-end Luxury	
47	Sobha Aranya T5	Gurugram Sec-80 28.371312°N 76.957976°E	152 metres (499 ft)	46	1 Tower	2031	Highest-end Luxury	
48	DLF Arbour	Gurugram Sec-63 28.397218°N 77.084022°E	151.3 metres (496 ft)	39	5 Towers	2027	Highest-end Luxury	
49	Sobha Aranya T1	Gurugram Sec-80 28.372649°N 76.956609°E	150 metres (492 ft)	43	1 Tower	2031	Highest-end Luxury	Tower is 150m till the roof
50	Sobha Aranya T2	Gurugram Sec-80 28.372649°N 76.957276°E	150 metres (492 ft)	43	1 Tower	2031	Highest-end Luxury	Tower is 150m till the roof
51	Sobha Aranya T3	Gurugram Sec-80 28.372649°N 76.957827°E	150 metres (492 ft)	43	1 Tower	2031	Highest-end Luxury	Tower is 150m till the roof
52	Signature Global De-Luxe DXP	Gurugram Sec-37D 28.442951°N 76.967638°E	150 metres (492 ft)	40	2 Towers	2030	High-end Luxury	Towers have a floor to ceiling height of 3.6m. 2 Towers in total development are skyscrapers
53	Hero Palatial B, C, E	Gurugram Sec-104 28.485838°N 76.994245°E	150 metres (492 ft)	41	3 Tower	2032	Luxury	Architectural height of Towers B, C and E is marginally over 150m
54	IndiaBulls Estate	Gurugram Sec-104 28.484988°N 76.996671°E	150 metres (492 ft)	44	3 Towers	2030	High-end Luxury	
55	Krisumi Forest Reserve	Gurugram Sec-36a 28.420023°N 76.973113°E	150 metres (492 ft)	40	6 Towers	2032	Highest-end Luxury	

== Tallest Highrises Under Construction and Launched ==
This list ranks buildings that are under construction and launched in Gurgaon that are planned to rise at least 100 m (330 ft). This includes spires and architectural details but does not include antenna masts.

The Height/Floors Ratio may differ between different projects as some buildings are being built upon Podiums/Clubs or Commercial Spaces.

Total Number of Highrises Under Construction and Launched: 280

Sr	Name	Area	Height	Floors	No. of Towers	Expected year of completion	Category
1	Tulip Crimson	Gurugram Sec-70	148 metres (486 ft)	36	5 Towers	2031	Luxury
2	Shapoorji Pallonji Dualis	Gurugram Sec-46	147 metres (482 ft)	33	2 Towers	2032	High-end Luxury
3	Signature Global Cloverdale SPR	Gurugram Sec-71	146 metres (479 ft)	35	6 Towers	2033	High-end Luxury
4	PURI Aravallis	Gurugram Sec-61	145 metres (476 ft)	42	3 Towers	2027	High-end Luxury
5	Tulip Monsella	Gurugram Sec-53	145 metres (476 ft)	40	3 Towers	2026	High-end Luxury
6	Krisumi Waterside Residences	Gurugram Sec-36a	145 metres (476 ft)	42	3 Towers	2032	High-end Luxury
7	Max Estate 360	Gurugram Sec-36a	141 metres (463 ft)	38	6 Towers	2032	Highest-end Luxury
8	Elan Emperor	Gurugram Sec-106	140 metres (459 ft)	40	5 Towers	2032	Highest-end Luxury
9	Silverglades Legacy	Gurugram Sec-63A	137 metres (449 ft)	36	5 Towers (P1+P2)	2031	High-end Luxury
10	Whiteland Aspen (T8-5)	Gurugram Sec-76	135 metres (443 ft)	34	4 Towers	2028	Highest-end Luxury
11	M3M Altitude	Gurugram Sec-65	135 metres (443 ft)	32	3 Towers	2032	Highest-end Luxury
12	Adani Veris	Sec-2, Gwal Pahri, Gurgaon-Faridabad Road	133 metres (436 ft)	33	1 Tower	2030	Highest-end Luxury
13	HCBS Twin Horizon	Gurugram Sec-102	131 metres (430 ft)	34	2 Towers	2030	Premium
14	DLF Dahlias	Gurugram Sec-54	130 metres (427 ft)	28	8 Towers	2032	Uber Luxury
15	PARAS Manor	Sec-2, Gwal Pahri, Gurgaon-Faridabad Road	130 metres (427 ft)	33	2 Towers	2031	High-end Luxury
16	Godrej Astra	Gurugram Sec-536	130 metres (427 ft)	35	2 Towers	2031	High-end Luxury
17	Adani Lushlands	Sec-2, Gwal Pahri, Gurgaon-Faridabad Road	130 metres (427 ft)	32	5 Towers (P1+P2)	2031	High-end Luxury
18	Tulip Monsella	Gurugram Sec-53	127 metres (417 ft)	36	7 Towers	2026	Luxury
19	Concient PARQ	Gurugram Sec-80	127 metres (417 ft)	34	4 Towers	2031	Luxury
20	M3M Icon at Merlin	Gurugram Sec-74	125 metres (410 ft)	33	1 Tower	2030	Luxury
21	Conscient Hines Elevate	Gurugram Sec-59	125 metres (410 ft)	33	5 Towers	2024	Luxury
23	Anant Raj The Estate Residences	Gurugram Sec-63A	125 metres (410 ft)	32	3 Towers	2030	Luxury
23	Mahindra Luminare	Gurugram Sec-59	125 metres (410 ft)	36	1 Tower (P3)	2024	Luxury
24	Godrej Sora	Gurugram Sec-53	125 metres (410 ft)	32	4 Towers	2032	Highest-end Luxury
25	Godrej Alira	Gurugram Sec-39	125 metres (410 ft)	33	1 Tower	2032	Luxury
26	Godrej Miraya	Gurugram Sec-43	124 metres (407 ft)	32	3 Towers	2032	Highest-end Luxury
27	Sobha Commercial 106	Gurugram Sec-106	124 metres (407 ft)	35	1 Tower	2030	Commercial
28	Krisumi Waterfall Residences	Gurugram Sec-36a	123 metres (404 ft)	34	2 Towers	2025	High-end Luxury
29	Grandstand Tower(s)	Gurugram Sec-99	123 metres (404 ft)	35	8 Towers	2024	Affordable
30	Navraj The Kingston Heights	Gurugram Sec-37D	122 metres (400 ft)	33	4 Towers	2032	Premium
31	Godrej Vrikshya	Gurugram Sec-103	120 metres (394 ft)	30	6 Towers	2032	Luxury
32	Godrej Aristocrat	Gurugram Sec-49	120 metres (394 ft)	31	3 Towers	2031	High-end Luxury
33	Krisumi Waterfall Suites	Gurugram Sec-36a	120 metres (394 ft)	34	1 Tower	2028	Luxury
34	Hero Homes	Gurugram Sec-104	120 metres (394 ft)	37	7 Towers	2025	Affordable
35	Navajo The Kingstown Heights	Gurugram Sec-37D	120 metres (394 ft)	33	3 Towers	2032	Premium
36	M3M Mansion	Gurugram Sec-113	120 metres (400 ft)	36	10 Towers	2025	High-end Luxury
37	M3M Capital	Gurugram Sec-113	120 metres (400 ft)	36	13 Towers	2025	Luxury
38	Emaar Urban Ascent	Gurugram Sec-112	119 metres (390 ft)	34	6 Towers	2031	Luxury
39	Conscient Elaria Residencecs	Gurugram Sec-80	119 metres (390 ft)	34	4 Towers	2032	Luxury
40	Emaar Amaris	Gurugram Sec-62	118 metres (387 ft)	33	4 Towers	2031	High-end Luxury
41	Elan Presidential	Gurugram Sec-106	117 metres (384 ft)	31	8 Towers	2030	High-end Luxury
42	Central Park Selene Tower	Sohna	117 metres (384 ft)	26	1 Tower	2030	Commercial
43	Trevoc Royal Residences	Gurugram Sec-56	117 metres (384 ft)	26	2 Towers	2032	Luxury
44	ATS Homekraft Sanctuary 105	Gurugram Sec-105	115 metres (377 ft)	34	11 Towers	2032	Premium
45	Puri Diplomatic Residences 2	Gurugram Sec-111	115 metres (377 ft)	32	6 Towers	2030	Premium
46	Godrej Zenith	Gurugram Sec-89	115 metres (377 ft)	37	9 Towers	2032	Luxury
47	Emaar India Business DIstrict	Gurugram Sec-61	113 metres (371 ft)	26	1 Tower	2030	Commercial
48	SS Camasa	Gurugram Sec-90	113 metres (371 ft)	32	4 Towers	2032	Premium
49	SS Cendana	Gurugram Sec-83	111 metres (364 ft)	33	10 Towers	2029	Premium
50	Max Estate 65 Commercial	Gurugram Sec-65	111 metres (364 ft)	26	1 Tower	2028	Commercial
51	M3M Crown	Gurugram Sec-113	107 metres (351 ft)	31	14 Towers	2028	Luxury
52	M3M Golf Hills	Gurugram Sec-79	107 metres (351 ft)	30	22 Towers	2027	High-end Luxury
53	Sobha Altus	Gurugram Sec-106	108 metres (354 ft)	29	2 Towers	2030	Luxury
54	Godrej Meridien	Gurugram Sec-106	107 metres (351 ft)	32	7 Towers	2024	Premium
55	Experion One42	Gurugram Sec-42	105 metres (344 ft)	24	3 Towers	2032	Highest-end Luxury
56	The Saavira	Gurugram Sec-48	103 metres (338 ft)	25	1 Tower	2030	Premium
57	Godrej Air	Gurugram Sec-85	103 metres (338 ft)	32	5 Towers	2025	Premium
58	Eldeco Fairway Reserve	Gurugram Sec-80	100 metres (328 ft)	27	6 Towers	2032	High-end Luxury
59	AlphaCorp Sky1	Gurugram Sec-15	100 metres (328 ft)	26	1 Tower	2029	Premium

== Tallest Buildings Approved ==
This list ranks buildings that are ApprovedGurgaon that are planned to rise at least 100 m (330 ft). This includes spires and architectural details but does not include antenna masts.

The Height/Floors Ratio may differ between different projects as some buildings are being built upon Podiums/Clubs or Commercial Spaces.

Total Number of Towers : 64

Sr	Name	Area	Height	Floors	No. of Towers	Expected year of completion	Category	
*	Oberoi 58	Gurugram Sec-58	243 metres (797 ft)	57	7 Towers	2030	Highest-end Luxury	
*	Signature Global SPR Commercial	Gurugram Sec-71	201 metres (659 ft)	50	2 Towers	2032	Commercial	
*	BPTP Amstoria Next Phase	Gurugram Sec-102	186 metres (610 ft)	51	1 Tower	2032	*	
*	TARC Ishva Expansion	Gurugram Sec-63	180 metres (591 ft)	46	1 Tower	2032	*	
*	Orris 89	Gurugram Sec-89	180 metres (591 ft)	48	2 Towers	2034		
	Trident DXP	Gurugram Sec-104	177 metres (581 ft)	40	8 Towers	2033		
*	AIPL Lake City	Gurugram Sec-103	168 metres (551 ft)	46	3 Towers (Next Phase)	2033		
*	SS Kiavasa	Gurugram Sec-83	162 metres (531 ft)	42	1 Tower	2030	Premium	
*	Adani Realty DXP	Gurugram Sec-102	161 metres (528 ft)	46	2 Towers	2031	*	
*	Orris 89	Gurugram Sec-89	160 metres (525 ft)	44	9 Towers	2034	*	
*	SS 83	Gurugram Sec-83	157 metres (515 ft)	42	4 Towers	2032	*	*
*	Sobha 63A	Gurugram Sec-63A	150 metres (492 ft)	47	5 Towers	2032	*	
*	Godrej 53	Gurugram Sec53	140 metres (459 ft)	37	5 Towers	2033	*	
*	Birla SPR	Gurugram Sec-71	133 metres (436 ft)	36	5 Towers	2031	*	
*	Puri 111	Gurugram Sec-111	110 metres (361 ft)	31	9 Towers	2032	*	

== Tallest buildings Under Approval/Under Proposal/Upcoming ==
This list ranks buildings that are under approval or have been proposed in Gurgaon and are planned to rise at least 100 m (330 ft) or 25 floors or more.

Sr	Name	Area	Height	Floors	No. of Towers	Category
	Sobha Aranya (Phase 2)	Gurugram Sec-80			5 Towers	
	Ganga Nandaka (Phase 2)	Gurugram Sec-84			3 Towers	
	Trehan Iris 80	Gurugram Sec-80			3 Towers	
	Experion 53	Gurugram Sec-53			4 Towers	
	Elan 49	Gurugram Sec-49			5 Towers	
	Elan 106 (Last Phase)				8 Towers	
	M3M Golf Estate (Last Phase)				8 Towers	
	SS Twin + Commercial				3 Towers	
	DLF Senior Living				2 Towers	
	DLF Privana East				8 Towers	
	Max Estate 58				4 Towers	
	DLF Hamilton 2				5 Towers	
	Westin Residences (Last Phase)				2 Towers	
	Krisumi+Max Commercial Dev.				5 Towers	
	Signature Global SPR				5 Towers	
	Proposed/Under Pipeline >150m				~ 75 Towers	
	M3M CFC				1 Tower	
	Max Estate Wellness Towers					
	Max Estate 361 2nd Phase					
	Experion Windchants 1 Tower					
	Mapkso Mountwille 1 Tower					
	Suncity Development 78					
	Eldeco 80 1 acre					
	Ashina Amara 80					
	Elan Imperial Hotel					
	sec 56 1 tower					
	Galaxy Magnum Realty					
	Puri Aravallias Phase 2					
	BPTP Amario					
	Ramprastha Edge Towers					
	SCDA Branded Residences					
	M3M 58		123 metres (404 ft)	36	16 Towers	
	M3M Manesar IMT		115 metres (377 ft)	35	7 Towers	
	Emaar 86		135 metres (443 ft)		8 Towers	

== See also ==
- List of tallest buildings in India
- List of tallest buildings in Delhi NCR
- List of tallest structures in India
- List of tallest buildings in Asia
- List of tallest buildings and structures in the Indian subcontinent
- List of tallest buildings in different cities in India
