= Ruchi Sally =

Entrepreneur and retail specialist

Ruchi Sally is a woman entrepreneur and retail specialist, who regularly gets quoted in Economic Times. It covers the 'Business of Brands' section that focuses on retail and consumer goods market in India. She has been the retail industry watcher and have been contributing her work to the journals for last 24 years. She is also the Managing Director of Elargir Solutions, a retail consulting & marketing company based in Mumbai

== Background ==
Ms. Sally is a post graduate from Delhi university. She worked with DLF Limited and Aditya Birla Group before founding Elargir Solutions.
