= Chaudhary Raghvendra Singh =

Indian real estate developer and founder of DLF (1910–2000)

- Born: 19 September 1910; Punjab Province (British India), British India, (now Haryana, India)
- Died: 13 June 2000 (aged 89); India
- Occupation: Real estate developer
- Known for: Founder, DLF Limited
- Relatives: Kushal Pal Singh (son-in-law)

Chaudhary Raghvendra Singh (19 September 1910 – 13 June 2000) was an Indian real estate developer known for founding DLF, then known as Delhi Land and Finance, in 1946. He laid the foundations for one of India's largest real estate companies, instrumental in transforming the urban landscape of Delhi and Gurgaon.

== Early life ==
Chaudhary Raghvendra Singh was born on 19 September 1910 in Punjab Province (British India), British India (now Haryana, India), into a Hindu Jat family with agricultural and military tradition.

== Business career ==
In 1946, Singh established DLF, then known as Delhi Land and Finance, with the aim of developing urban residential colonies in the capital city of Delhi. His early projects included the creation of neighbourhoods like South Extension, Greater Kailash, and Hauz Khas in the 1950s and 1960s. In 1961, the Indian government transferred urban development control to the Delhi Development Authority (DDA), which restricted private real estate development in Delhi. This prompted Singh and his son-in-law, Kushal Pal Singh, to look for new opportunities outside the capital. DLF shifted its focus to Gurgaon (now Gurugram), where his and Kushal Pal's business plans led to the region's transformation into a modern urban hub. In 1995, Kushal Pal became the chairman of DLF.

== Personal life ==
Singh died on 13 June 2000.

== Legacy ==
After Singh's death, his son-in-law, Kushal Pal, expanded DLF into the largest real estate company in India.
