= List of tallest buildings in Delhi-NCR =

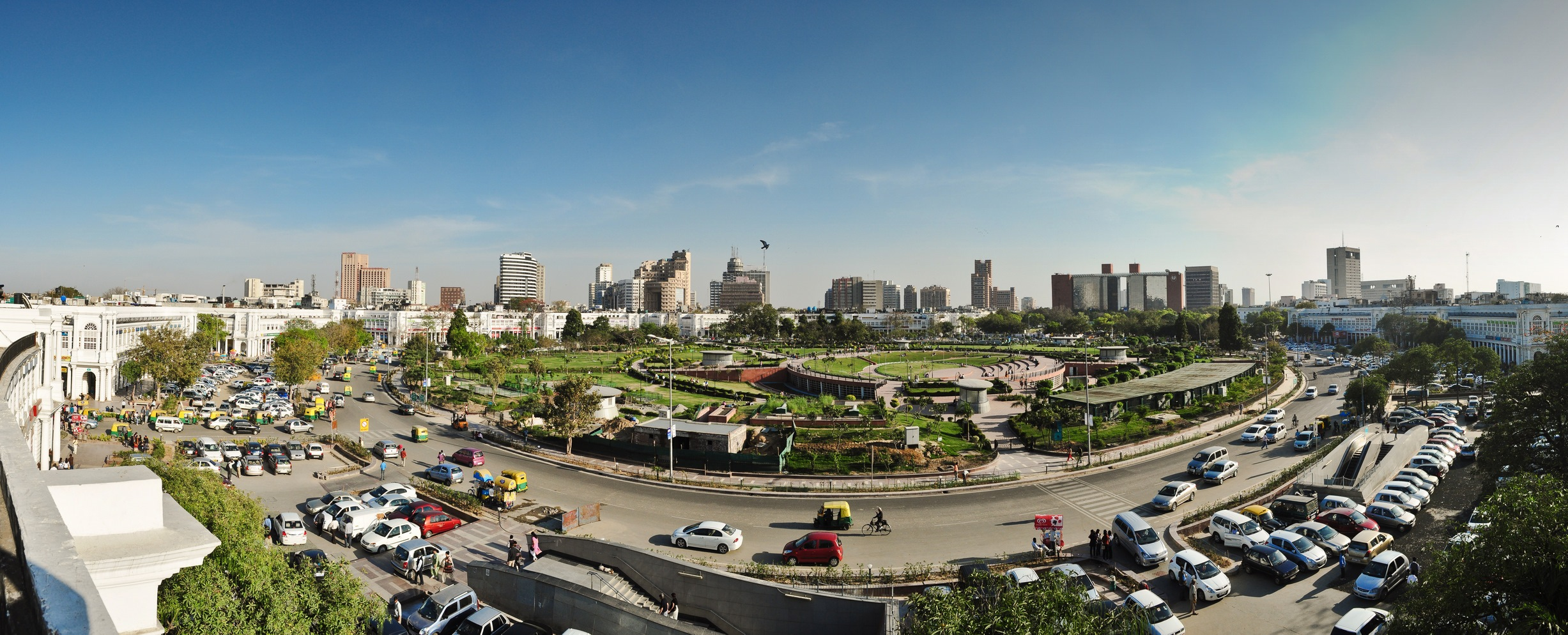
New Delhi skyline.

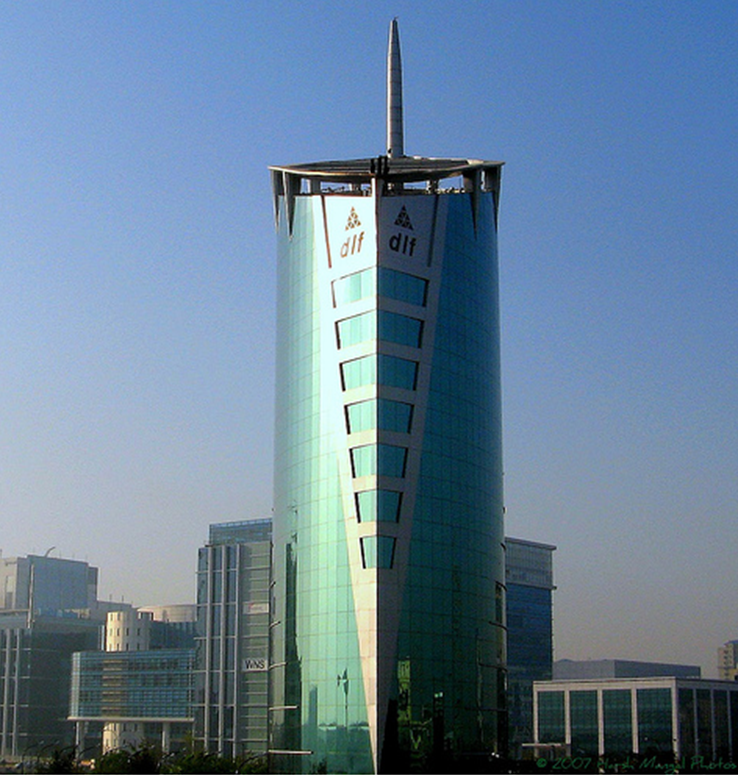
Gateway Tower in Gurugram.

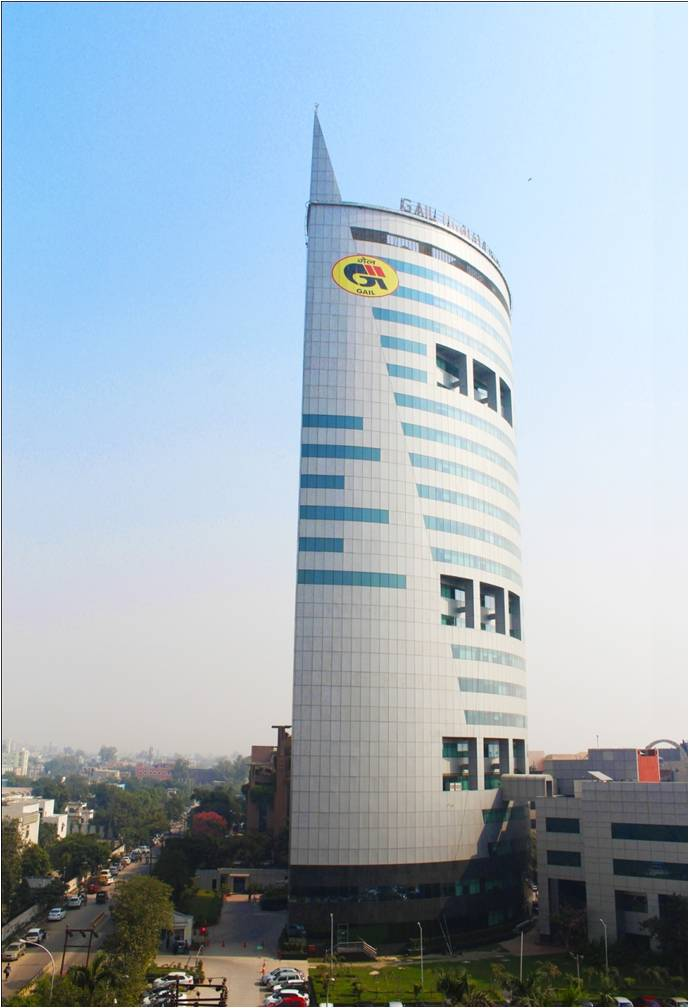
GAIL Jubilee Tower, in Noida.

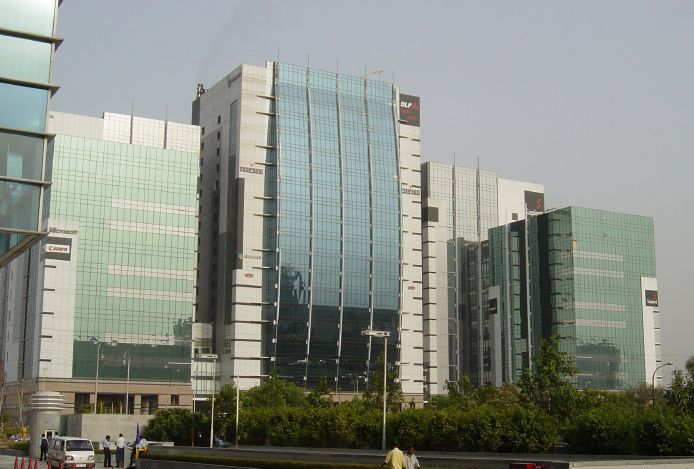
Cyber Green Hub Building in Gurugram.

This list enumerates high-rise buildings and skyscrapers in the city of Delhi, the largest megacity in India, alongside those larger throughout the National Capital Region area. Currently there are around 29 skyscrapers and more than 5,200 high-rise buildings in the Delhi NCR area with thousands more under construction. Cyberthum Towers A and B are currently the tallest buildings in Delhi NCR with a height of 213.7 metres (701 ft) and consisting of 50 floors.

Supernova Spira, which was initially proposed to rise up to 300 metres (984 ft) with 80 floors, is currently on hold. Although its revised architectural plans indicate an elevation of 68 floors, the construction work remains on hold as of November 2025.

== Tallest buildings ==
This list ranks buildings in Delhi NCR that stand at least 125 metres (410 ft), based on standard height measurement or are at least 30 floors tall, as of June 2025. This includes spires and architectural details but does not include antenna masts. Only completed buildings and under-construction and on-hold buildings that have been topped out are included.

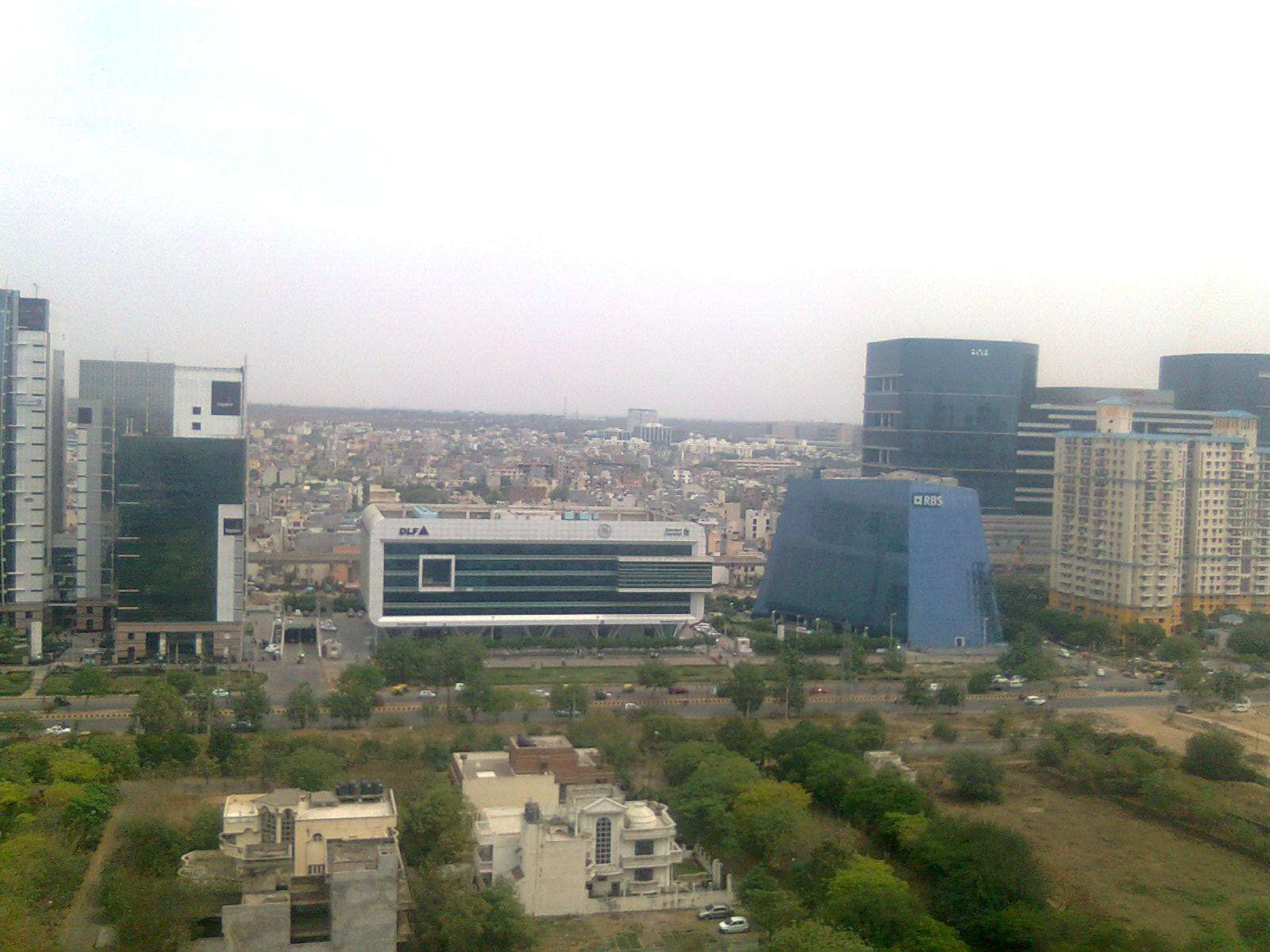
Gurgaon's skyline.

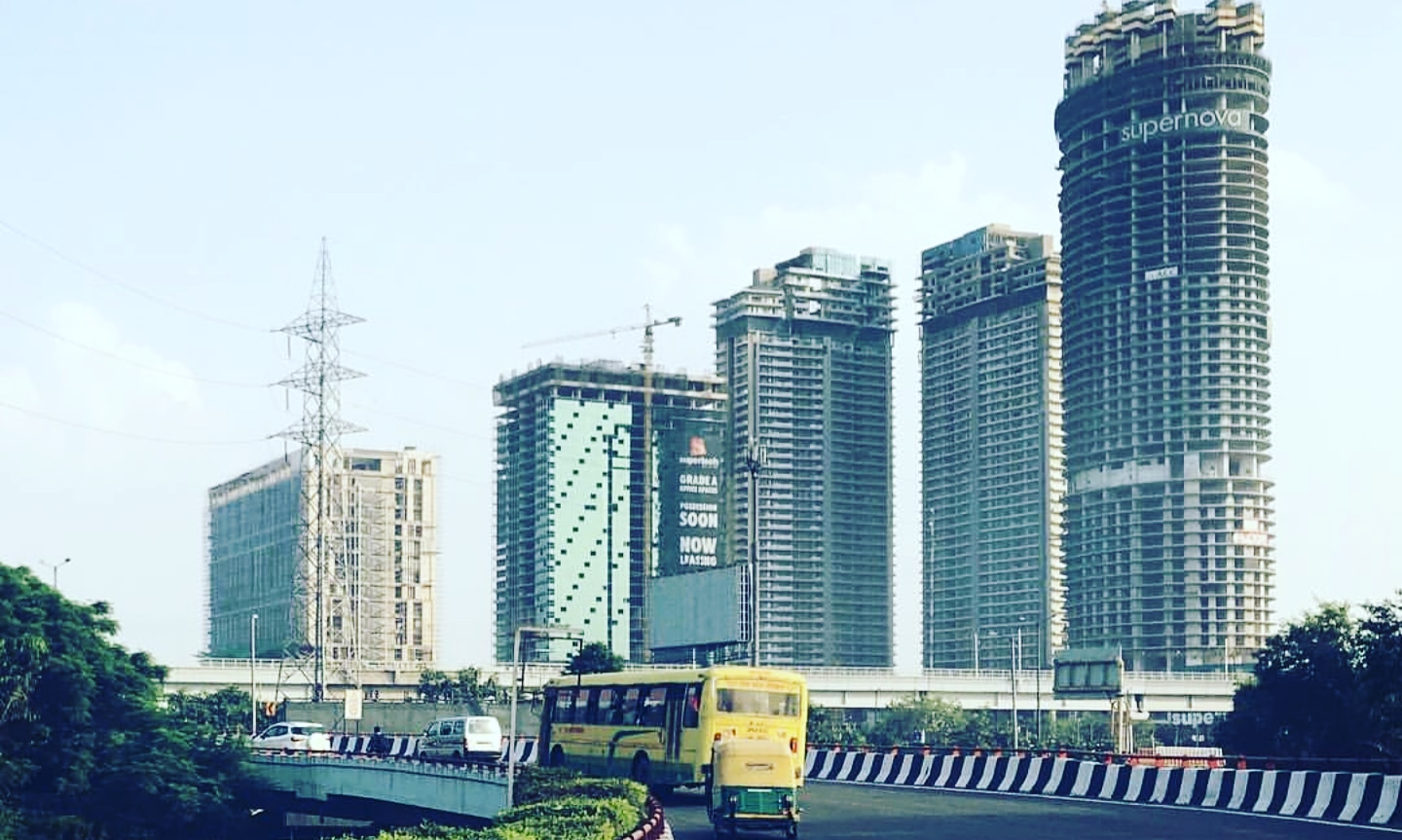
Supernova Spira, which was proposed to be the tallest building in the Delhi NCR region, is currently on hold.

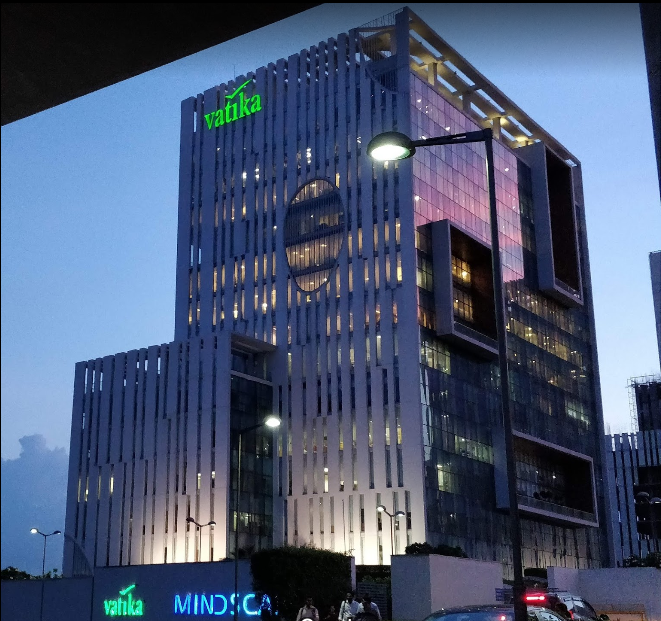
Vatika Business Towers in Faridabad.

Name	Location	City	Height	Floors	Year	Building type
Cyberthum Tower A	Sector 140A 28°31′N 77°25′E	Noida	213.7 metres (701 ft)	50	2024	Commercial
Cyberthum Tower B	Sector 140A 28°31′N 77°25′E	Noida	213.7 metres (701 ft)	50	2024	Commercial
The Amaryllis Iconic Tower	New Rothak Road, Karol Bagh 28°39′32″N 77°11′42″E	Delhi	208 metres (682 ft)	49	2025	Residential
Trump Towers Delhi NCR Tower 1	Samrat Naagbhatt Gurjar Road, Sector-65 28°23′56″N 7°04′19″E	Gurugram	201.53 metres (661 ft)	55	2024	Commercial + Residential
Trump Towers Delhi NCR Tower 2	Samrat Naagbhatt Gurjar Road, Sector-65 28°23′56″N 7°04′19″E	Gurugram	201.53 metres (661 ft)	55	2024	Commercial + Residential
M3M IFC	Khushal Sadh Baba Marg, Sector-66 28°24′14″N 77°03′29″E	Gurugram	199.3 metres (654 ft)	44	2023	Commercial
Raheja Revanta & MT60	Shikohpur Village Main Road, Sector-78 28°22′23″N 76°58′37″E	Gurugram	199.05 metres (653 ft)	60	2020(Topped-Out)	Residential
Nova East	Gautam Budh Road, Sector-78 28°33′00″N 77°19′23″E	Noida	180 metres (591 ft)	44	2019	Residential
Nova West	Gautam Budh Road, Sector-78 28°33′00″N 77°19′23″E	Noida	180 metres (591 ft)	44	2019	Residential
Wave Livork	Amity Road, Sector-125 28°32′35″N 77°19′48″E	Noida	179 metres (587 ft)	46	2021	Residential
Victory Valley Tower A	Main Gujjar Road, Sector-67 28°23′24″N 77°03′50″E	Gurugram	178 metres (584 ft)	51	2015	Residential
Paras Quartier A	Faridabad-Gurgaon Road, Sector-2 28°26′13″N 77°08′02″E	Gurugram	170 metres (558 ft)	44	2019	Residential
ATS Knightsbridge Tower 1	Gautam Budh Road, Sector-94 28°33′00″N 77°19′44″E	Noida	169 metres (554 ft)	47	2022	Residential
ATS Knightsbridge Tower 3	Gautam Budh Road, Sector-94 28°33′00″N 77°19′44″E	Noida	169 metres (554 ft)	47	2022	Residential
ATS Knightsbridge Tower 5	Gautam Budh Road, Sector-94 28°33′00″N 77°19′44″E	Noida	169 metres (554 ft)	47	2022	Residential
Burj Noida	Eco City Road, Sector-95 28°34′30″N 77°22′52″E	Noida	165 metres (541 ft)	36	2023	Residential
M3M Golf Estate 1	Golf Estate Road, Sector-65 28°24′07″N 77°03′54″E	Gurugram	163 metres (535 ft)	42	2017	Residential
M3M Golf Estate 2	Golf Estate Road, Sector-65 28°24′07″N 77°03′54″E	Gurugram	163 metres (535 ft)	42	2017	Residential
M3M Golf Estate 3	Golf Estate Road, Sector-65 28°24′07″N 77°03′54″E	Gurugram	163 metres (535 ft)	42	2017	Residential
M3M Latitude	Golf Estate Road, Sector-65 28°23′56″N 77°03′47″E	Gurugram	160.5 metres (527 ft)	44	2021	Residential
DLF Camellias	Camellias Road, Sector-42 28°27′00″N 77°06′00″E	Gurugram	156 metres (512 ft)	39	2017	Residential
The Amaryllis Towers R-S	New Rothak Road, Karol Bagh 28°39′32″N 77°11′46″E	Delhi	155.3 metres (510 ft)	41	2025	Residential
Wave One	Maharaja Agrasen Marg, Sector-18 28°34′08″N 77°19′23″E	Noida	155 metres (509 ft)	41	2015	Commercial
Victory Valley Tower B	Main Gujjar Road, Sector-67 28°23′28″N 77°03′50″E	Gurugram	155 metres (509 ft)	45	2015	Residential
UGCC Amber Tower 1	Sector-45 Road, Sector-96 28°32′42″N 77°20′56″E	Noida	154 metres (505 ft)	45	2016	Residential
UGCC Amber Tower 2	Sector-45 Road, Sector-96 28°32′42″N 77°20′56″E	Noida	154 metres (505 ft)	45	2016	Residential
Primanti 2	Tatvam Villas Road, Sector-72 28°24′22″N 77°02′10″E	Gurugram	154 metres (505 ft)	40	2016	Residential
M3M Golfestate T9	Samrat Mihir Bhoj Road, Sector-65 28°24′07″N 77°03′54″E	Gurugram	153 metres (502 ft)	42	2018	Residential
Primanti 1	Tatvam Villas Road, Sector-72 28°24′22″N 77°02′06″E	Gurugram	147 metres (482 ft)	38	2015	Residential
Primanti 7	Southern Peripheral Road Sector-72 28°24′07″N 77°02′06″E	Gurugram	147 metres (482 ft)	38	2016	Residential
DLF One Midtown	Najafgarh Road, Moti Nagar 28°39′50″N 77°09′18″E	Delhi	147 metres (482 ft)	39	2024	Residential
DLF The Crest 1	Park Dr, Sector-54 28°26′38″N 77°06′40″E	Gurugram	144 metres (472 ft)	38	2017	Residential
DLF The Crest 2	Park Dr, Sector-54 28°26′38″N 77°06′40″E	Gurugram	144 metres (472 ft)	38	2017	Residential
DLF The Crest 3	Park Dr, Sector-54 28°26′38″N 77°06′40″E	Gurugram	144 metres (472 ft)	38	2017	Residential
Ansal Royal Heritage	IMT Main Road, sector-70 28°20′10″N 77°21′11″E	Faridabad	140 metres (459 ft)	33	2017	Residential
Mapsko Mount Ville	Mountville Road, Sector-79 28°21′36″N 76°58′08″E	Gurugram	140 metres (459 ft)	37	2017	Residential
Victory Valley Tower C	Ramgarh Road, Sector-67 28°23′20″N 77°03′40″E	Gurugram	136 metres (446 ft)	35	2015	Residential
Ireo Skyon	Skyon Road, Sector-60 28°24′00″N 77°05′46″E	Gurugram	135 metres (443 ft)	40	2017	Residential
Paras quartier B	Faridabad-Gurgaon Road, Sector-2 28°26′17″N 77°08′06″E	Gurugram	135 metres (443 ft)	38	2018	Residential
UGCC Burgundy	Sector-45 Road, Sector-97 28°32′35″N 77°21′14″E	Noida	135 metres (443 ft)	36	2017	Residential
Jaypee Krescent Homes 1	Wazidpur Road, Sector-129 28°30′22″N 77°22′59″E	Noida	132 metres (433 ft)	35	2016	Residential
Jaypee Krescent Homes 2	Wazidpur Road, Sector-129 28°30′22″N 77°22′59″E	Noida	132 metres (433 ft)	35	2016	Residential
Jaypee Krescent Homes 3	Wazidpur Road, Sector-129 28°30′22″N 77°22′59″E	Noida	132 metres (433 ft)	35	2016	Residential
Jaypee Krescent Homes 4	Wazidpur Road, Sector-129 28°30′22″N 77°22′59″E	Noida	132 metres (433 ft)	35	2016	Residential
Pioneer Araya 1	Senapati Prataprao Gurjar Marg, Sector-62 28°24′40″N 77°05′17″E	Noida	132 metres (433 ft)	35	2016	Residential
Pioneer Araya 2	Senapati Prataprao Gurjar Marg, Sector-62 28°24′40″N 77°05′17″E	Noida	132 metres (433 ft)	35	2016	Residential
Pioneer Araya 3	Senapati Prataprao Gurjar Marg, Sector-62 28°24′40″N 77°05′17″E	Noida	132 metres (433 ft)	35	2016	Residential
Raheja Vanya 1	Delhi-Alwar Road, Sector-99 28°25′23″N 77°02′24″E	Gurugram	132 metres (433 ft)	35	2019	Residential
Raheja Vanya 2	Delhi-Alwar Road, Sector-99 28°25′23″N 77°02′24″E	Gurugram	132 metres (433 ft)	35	2019	Residential
Supertech Eco Village	Samrat Ashok Road, Sector-18 28°34′44″N 77°26′20″E	Greater Noida	130 metres (427 ft)	36	2019	Residential
Merlin Tower 7	Main Gujjar Road, Sector-67 28°23′20″N 77°03′32″E	Gurugram	130 metres (427 ft)	34	2016	Residential
ATS Kingston Heath	Panjetani Road, Sec-150 28°25′26″N 77°29′10″E	Noida	130 metres (427 ft)	34	2020	Residential
Prius Vision Tower	Southern Peripheral Road, Sector-62 29°24′40″N 77°05′06″E	Gurugram	130 metres (427 ft)	30	2016	Commercial
Prius Vision Tower A	Southern Peripheral Road, Sector-62 29°24′40″N 77°05′06″E	Gurugram	130 metres (427 ft)	30	2016	Commercial
ATS Destinaire	LN Mishra Marg, Sector-1 28°32′49″N 77°26′13″E	Greater Noida	130 metres (427 ft)	33	2016	Residential
World Trade Tower A	Amaltash Marg, Sec-16 28°34′34″N 77°19′01″E	Noida	128 metres (420 ft)	34	2013	Commercial
ATS Pious Orchards	Pushta Road, Sector-150 28°24′58″N 77°29′24″E	Noida	126 metres (413 ft)	35	2021	Residential
Pioneer Park	Senapati Prataprao Gurjar Marg, Sector-61 28°24′50″N 77°05′31″E	Gurugram	125 metres (410 ft)	33	2014	Residential

== Tallest buildings (under-construction) ==
This list ranks buildings that are under construction in the Delhi NCR and are planned to rise at least 100 m (330 ft) or 25 floors or more. Buildings that are only approved, on hold or proposed are not included in this table.

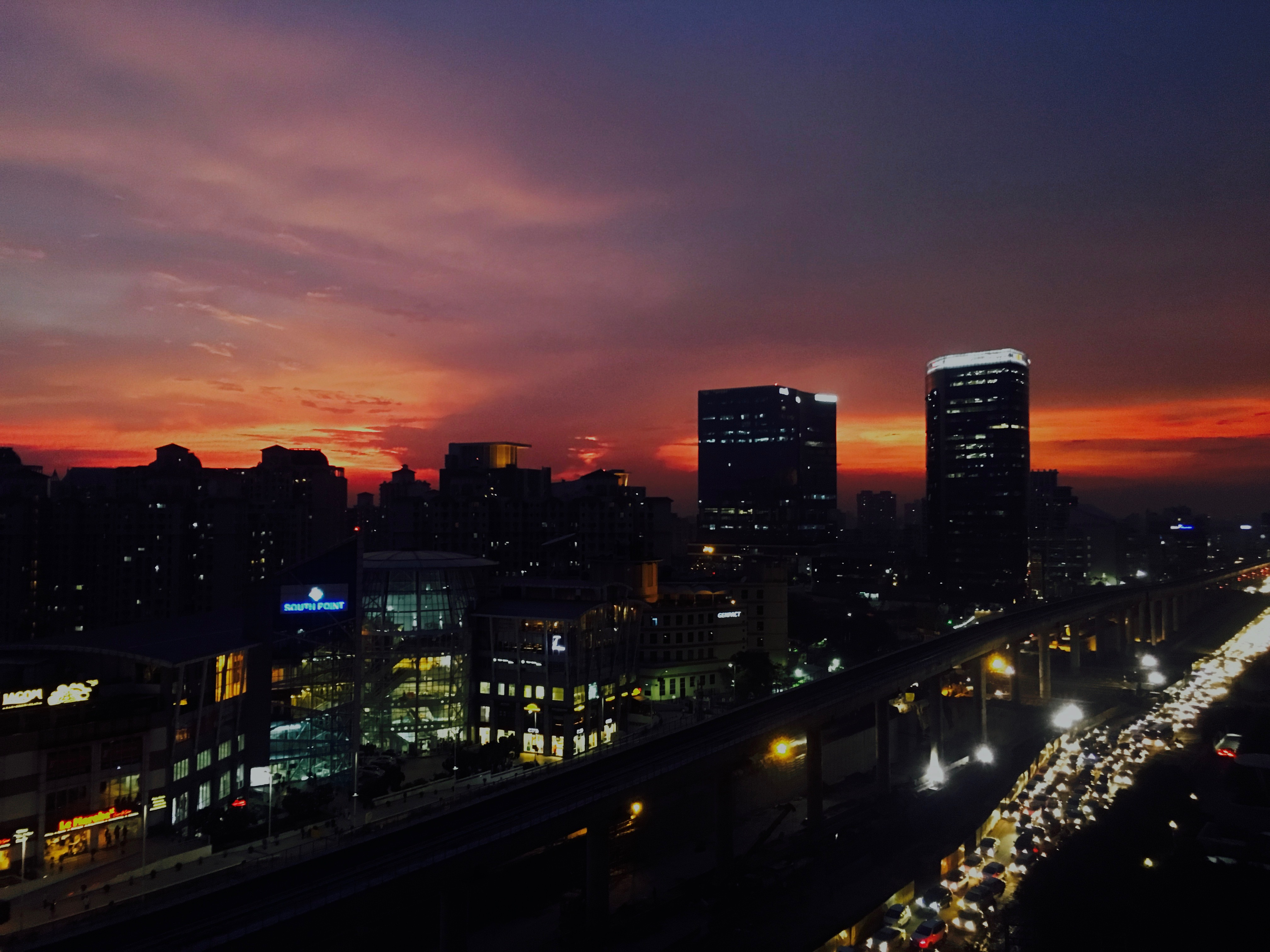
Gurgaon's Skyline at Dusk.

Sr	Name	Area	Height	Floors	Expected year of completion
1	Supernova Spira	Noida Sector-94	300 metres (984 ft)	80	On hold. Revised building plans indicate construction up to 68 floors only.
2	North Eye	Noida Sec-74	255 metres (837 ft)	66	2026
3	Golf Estate Twin Tower 1	Gurugram Sec-65	190 metres (623 ft)	52	2025
4	Golf Estate Twin Tower 2	Gurugram Sec-65	190 metres (623 ft)	52	2025
5	Delhi One 1	Noida Sec-16B	190 metres (623 ft)	42	2026
6	Navin Minar (Leela Sky Villas)	Kirti Nagar, Delhi	190 metres (623 ft)	42	2025
7	Grandthum by Group 108	Greater Noida (West)	190 meters (623 ft)	34	2025
8	One FNG by Group 108	Noida Sec-142	176 meters (577 ft)	37	2028
9	Orb Homes 1	Noida Sec-74	175 metres (574 ft)	48	On hold
10	Orb Homes 2	Noida Sec-74	175 metres (574 ft)	48	On hold
11	Orb Homes 3	Noida Sec-74	175 metres (574 ft)	48	On hold
12	M3M Sky City	Gurugram Sec-66	175 metres (574 ft)	47	2025
13	M3M 65th Avenue	Gurugram Sec-66	172 metres (564 ft)	47	2025
14	M3M Heights	Gurugram	172 metres (564 ft)	47	2025
15	Kabana High	Greater Noida Sec-4	171 metres (561 ft)	35	2025
16	ATS Knightsbridge Tower 2	Noida Sec-124	171 metres (561 ft)	47	2026
17	ATS Knightsbridge Tower 4	Noida Sec-124	171 metres (561 ft)	47	2026
18	Unitech Grande	Noida Sec-96	162 metres (531 ft)	45	2025
19	County Courtyard	Pitam Pura, Delhi	155 metres (509 ft)	38*2	2026
20	Godrej Iconic Tower	Okhla, Delhi	145 metres (476 ft)	36	2026
21	Saya Gold Avenue	Ghaziabad	145 metres (476 ft)	40	2026
22	BPTP Capital City 4	Noida Sec-94	145 metres (476 ft)	40	2023
23	Raheja Oma	Dharuhera	145 metres (476 ft)	40	2023
24	Tulip Monsella 1	Gurugram Sec-53	141.50 metres (464 ft)	39	2025
25	Tulip Monsella 2	Gurugram Sec-53	141.50 metres (464 ft)	39	2025
26	Tulip Monsella 3	Gurugram Sec-53	141.50 metres (464 ft)	39	2025
27	Delhi One 2	Noida Sec-16B	130 metres (427 ft)	37	2023
28	Apex The Kremlin	Taj Expressway Noida	130 metres (427 ft)	37	2021
29	ATS Picturesque Reprieves 1	Noida Sec-152	130 metres (427 ft)	37	2023
30	ATS Picturesque Reprieves 2	Noida Sec-152	130 metres (427 ft)	37	2023
31	ATS Picturesque Reprieves 3	Noida Sec-152	130 metres (427 ft)	37	2023
32	ATS Picturesque Reprieves 4	Noida Sec-152	130 metres (427 ft)	37	2023
33	ATS Picturesque Reprieves 5	Noida Sec-152	130 metres (427 ft)	37	2023
34	Hero Homes Tower 1	Gurugram Sec-104	130 metres (427 ft)	37	2025
35	Hero Homes Gurgaon Tower 2	Gurugram Sec-104	130 metres (427 ft)	37	2025
36	Hero Homes Tower 3	Gurugram Sec-104	130 metres (427 ft)	37	2025
37	Hero Homes Tower 4	Gurugram Sec-104	130 metres (427 ft)	37	2025
38	Skyville 1	Gurugram Sec-68	125 metres (410 ft)	36	2022
39	Cyprees Court 1	Greater Noida	125 metres (410 ft)	36	2022
40	Cyprees Court 2	Greater Noida	125 metres (410 ft)	36	2022
41	Grandstand Tower 1	Gurugram Sec-99	122 metres (400 ft)	35	2022
42	Grandstand Tower 2	Gurugram Sec-99	122 metres (400 ft)	35	2022
43	Grandstand Tower 3	Gurugram Sec-99	122 metres (400 ft)	35	2022
44	Grandstand Tower 4	Gurugram Sec-99	122 metres (400 ft)	35	2022
45	Grandstand Tower 5	Gurugram Sec-99	122 metres (400 ft)	35	2022
46	Grandstand Tower 6	Gurugram Sec-99	122 metres (400 ft)	35	2022
47	M3M Duo High	Gurugram Sec-65	118 metres (387 ft)	35	2021
48	M3M Broadway	Gurugram Sec-71	118 metres (387 ft)	30	2023
49	M3M Cornerwalk	Gurugram Sec-74	118 metres (387 ft)	30	2021
50	M3M Skywalk	Gurugram Sec-74	118 metres (387 ft)	30	2025
51	Silvergrades Hightown	Gurugram Sec-74	109 metres (358 ft)	27	2025
52	M3M Icon	Gurugram Sec-74	105 metres (344 ft)	32	2022
53	M3M Skywalk	Gurugram Sec-74	105 metres (344 ft)	30	2023
54	Risland Sky Mansion	Chhatarpur, Delhi	105 metres (344 ft)	25	2023
55	Godrej South Estate	Okhla, Delhi	105 metres (344 ft)	36	2025
56	Unity Amaryllis- Phase 2	Kirti Nagar, Delhi	120 metres (394 ft)	31	2022
57	Krisumi Waterfall Residences	Gurugram Sec-36a	100 metres (328 ft)	34	2025
58	M3M Capital	Gurugram Sec-113	100 metres (328 ft)	36	2026

== Timeline of tallest buildings of Delhi NCR ==
Name	Image	Height	Floors	Years as tallest
Cyberthum		213.7 metres (701 ft)	50	2024-2025
Raheja Revanta		196 metres (643 ft)	56	2018-2024
Victory Valley Tower		178 metres (584 ft)	51	2015–2018
World Trade Tower		128 metres (420 ft)	34	2013-2015
Civic Center		101 metres (331 ft)	28	2008–2013
Hansalaya		88 metres (289 ft)	21	-2008
Vikas Minar		82 metres		1976-

== See also ==
- List of tallest buildings in India
- List of tallest structures in India
- List of tallest buildings in Gurgaon
- List of tallest buildings in Asia
- List of tallest buildings and structures in South Asia
- List of tallest buildings in different cities in India
- List of tallest buildings
