= Vikas Minar =

Office building in Delhi, India

Vikas Minar, Delhi

Vikas Minar (The Tower of Progress) is a 23-storey building in Delhi that houses offices of the Delhi Development Authority. Built in 1976, it was designed by Habib Rahman and was at completion the first building in Delhi to surpass the Qutb Minar in height.

== Design and construction ==
Vikas Minar was designed by Habib Rahman, the then Chief Architect of the Central Public Works Department, as a point-block tower and construction lasted from 1969 to 1976. Actual construction was undertaken by the Ansal Group at a cost of ₹85 lakhs. At 82 meters in height, it was the tallest building in Delhi and the first to surpass the Qutb Minar and became a landmark in Delhi. With its exposed beams and columns, the building, which is devoid of louvers, façades or any decorative elements, is an important example of Modernist architecture in Delhi although its structure and design have been criticized as being visually unappealing and grossly energy inefficient.

It was the tallest building in Delhi until Ambadeep (84 meters) and Hansalaya (88 meters) were built.
