= Supernova Spira =

Under construction skyscraper in Noida, Uttar Pradesh, India

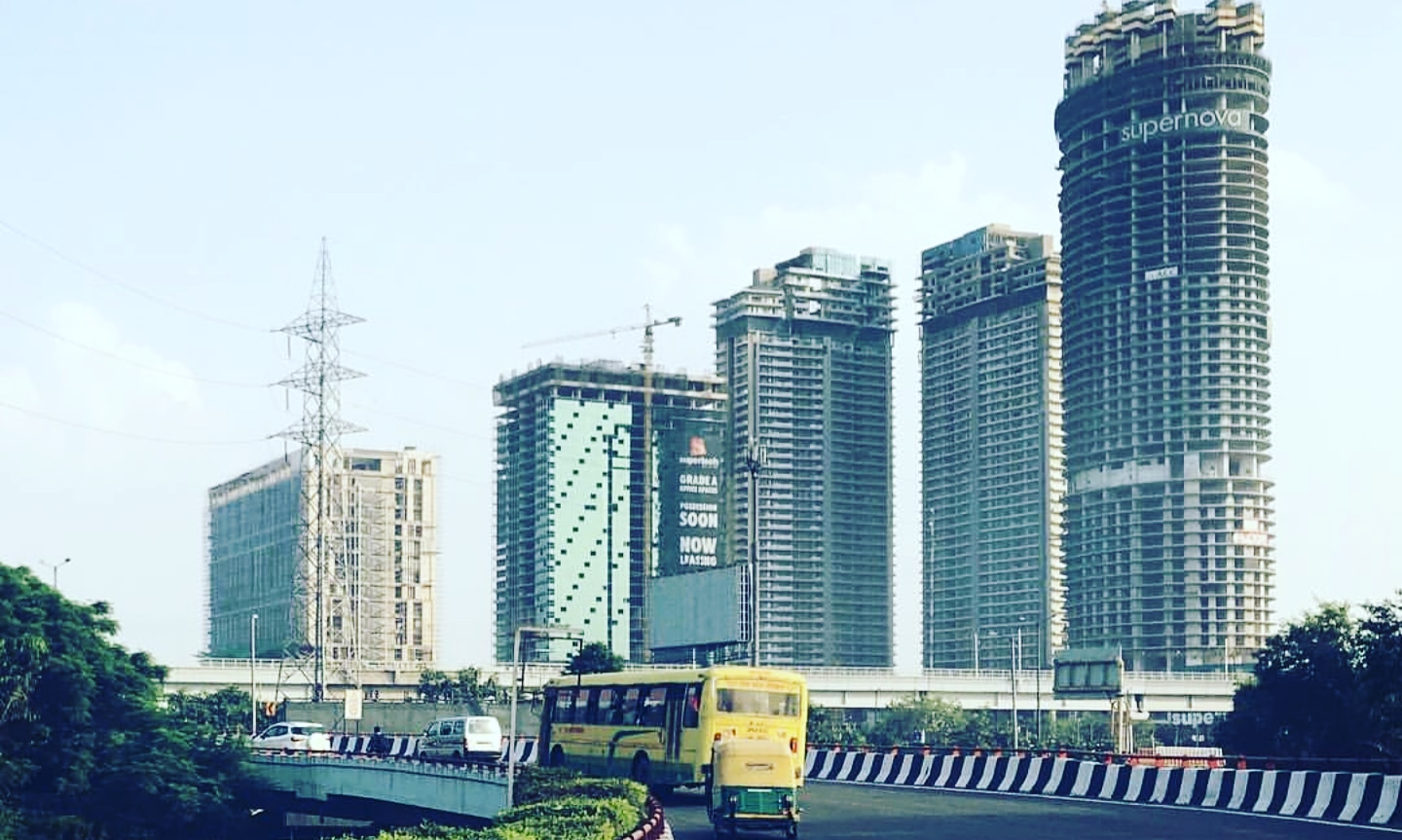
- Interactive map of the Supernova Spira area

General information
- Status: On-hold
- Type: Mixed use
- Location: Noida, India
- Coordinates: 28.5502°N 77.3228°E
- Construction started: 2012
- Owner: Supertech

Height
- Roof: 300 metres (980 ft) (proposed)

Technical details
- Floor count: 68 (actual); 80 (proposed)
- Lifts/elevators: 37

Design and construction
- Architect: Benoy
- Developer: Supertech

Website
- Official website

Supernova Spira is an under construction mixed-use skyscraper in Noida, Uttar Pradesh, India being developed by Supertech. It is located in Sector 94, Amrapali Marg, Noida.

The building was originally designed to stand 300 metres (984 ft) tall with 80 floors and would have been the tallest building in India outside of Mumbai. However, due to significant construction delays stemming from the COVID-19 pandemic and financial challenges, the plans were subsequently revised. The updated design now comprises 68 floors, following the removal of several elements from the original blueprint—most notably, the extruding helipad and the tapering building facade at the top of the structure.

Upon completion, it will become the tallest building in Delhi-NCR.

== Construction updates ==
- 2012: Construction started.
- January 2016: Construction of 38 floors is completed.
- June 2017: The structure crosses 180 metres (591 ft) in height with around 48 floors.
- August 2018: Construction reaches the 59th floor. Managing Director of Supertech Limited announces proposed completion by 2020.
- April 2020: Construction paused due to the COVID-19 pandemic.
- September 2020: Uttar Pradesh Real Estate Regulatory Authority (UP-RERA) initiates investigations into financial irregularities related to the Supernova Spira project. Construction is put on hold indefinitiely.
- June 2024: Insolvency proceedings initiated against Supertech Supernova. Project continues to remain on hold, with 60% of the construction complete and 68 floors having been built.
- August 2024: Kotak Investments takes over the Supernova Spira project.

As of October 2025, the project is still on hold and there is no active construction work ongoing at the project.

== Architecture ==
Supernova Spira is designed as a mixed-use skyscraper combining residential, commercial, and hospitality functions within a single vertical complex. Designed by the UK-based architectural firm Benoy and inspired by the fluid forms of the Yamuna waterway, the tower follows a modern architectural style characterized by a sleek glass facade and a cylindrical form that emphasizes height and symmetry.

The lowest levels are planned for premium retail, service lobbies, and office spaces, while the low floors (5th to 17th) are designated for residential apartments with 3BHK and 4BHK layouts, branded as Spira Residences. The mid-level floors (19th to 43rd) include luxury residential suites and the highest floors (59th to 66th) offer the exclusive Spira Sky Villas. Office spaces are located in the 46th to 58th floors. The tower also includes a helipad and observation deck on the 68th floor, offering panoramic views of Noida and the Yamuna River basin.

High-speed elevators and advanced building management systems are designed to support the mixed-use nature of the development, while sustainable features such as energy-efficient glass and smart environmental controls align the project with international green-building standards.

== See also ==
- List of tallest buildings in Delhi NCR
- List of tallest buildings in India
