= Kushal Pal Singh =

Indian real estate businessman

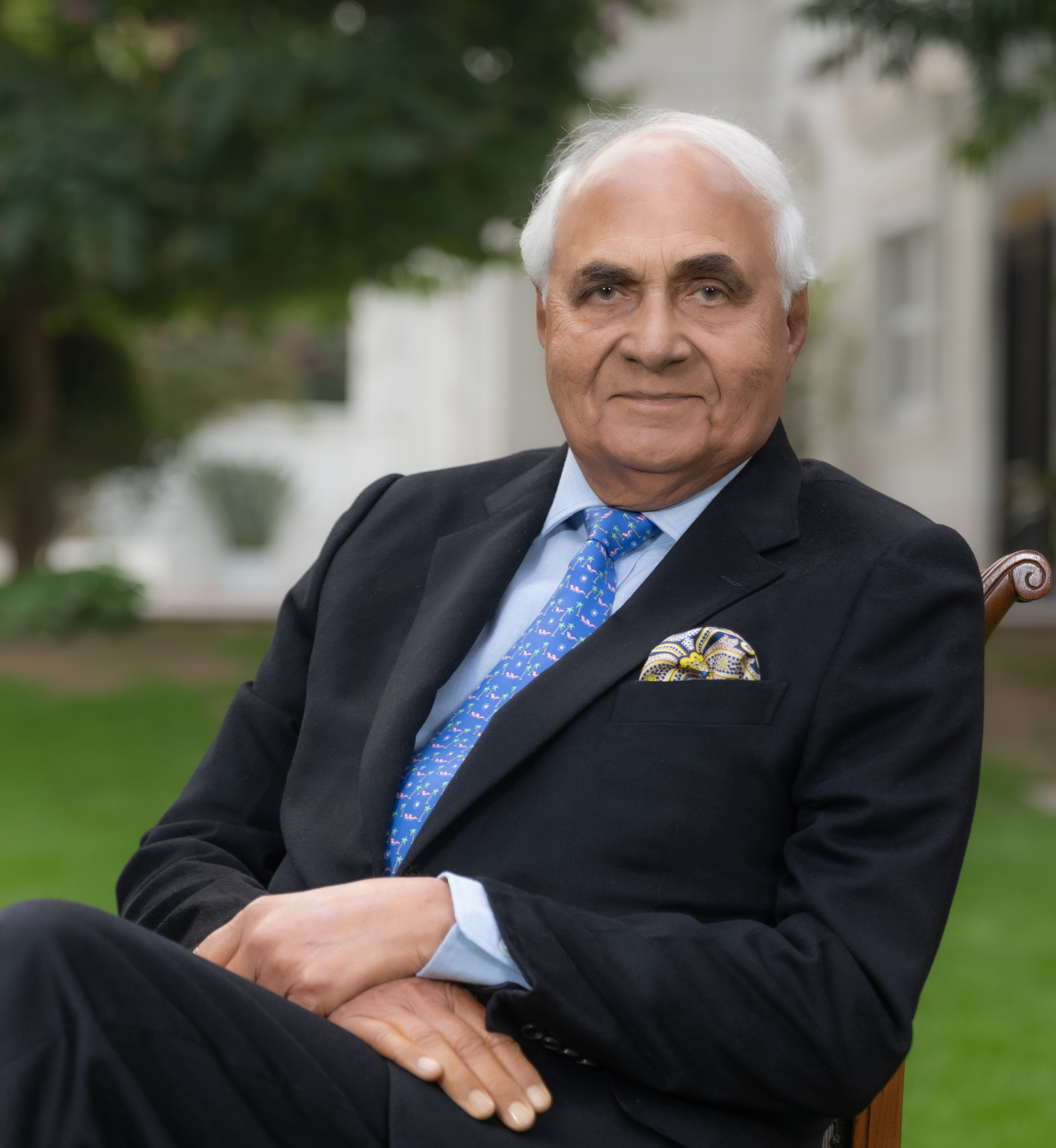
- Singh in 2024
- Born: 15 August 1931 (age 95); Bulandshahr, United Provinces, British India (now in Uttar Pradesh, India)
- Education: Meerut College
- Occupations: Businessman; army officer (retired)
- Spouse: Indira Singh (died 2018)
- Children: 3, including Rajiv Singh
- Relatives: Chaudhary Raghvendra Singh (father-in-law)
- Military career
- Allegiance: India
- Branch: Indian Army
- Service years: 1951-1960
- Rank: Captain
- Unit: The Deccan Horse
- Website: DLF.in

Kushal Pal Singh (born 15 August 1931) is an Indian billionaire real estate developer and retired military officer. He is one of India's richest people according to Forbes. Singh was the chairman and chief executive officer of the Indian real estate company DLF, founded by his father-in-law Chaudhary Raghvendra Singh, until 2020. Singh built DLF into the largest real estate company in India and DLF holds India's largest land bank of more than 10,000 acres. His autobiography, named Whatever the Odds: The Incredible Story Behind DLF, was published in 2011; Jack Welch spoke at the launch.

Singh has been noted for making Gurgaon, Haryana, from a village into a modern and developed city. Singh has also been noted for his relationship with the Nehru-Gandhi political family, which, according to himself, benefited his businesses especially during its early stages, and has also been a source of controversy during his career. In October 2024, Singh was ranked 12th on the Forbes list of India's 100 richest, with a net worth of $20.5 billion.

== Early life and military career ==
Kushal Pal Singh was born on 15 August 1931 to a family of Jat landlords in Bulandshahr, United Provinces, British India. His father, Mukhtar Singh, was a reputed lawyer in Bulandshahr. He completed his schooling at Mayo College, Ajmer. Later he graduated in science from Meerut College, Uttar Pradesh, he pursued aeronautical engineering in London, England. Singh's uncle was in charge of the stables at the then-Viceregal Lodge, which is now Rashtrapati Bhavan, and during Singh's visit to his uncle, he unexpectedly met the then-Viceroy of India, Lord Wavell, who suggested he pursue riding. His father then sent him to England, hiding from Singh that he incurred financial debt to get him there.

Singh completed his early education in India and went on to graduate in science from Meerut College. Following his graduation, he moved to the United Kingdom, where he studied aeronautical engineering. While playing polo in near Windsor, Singh met an officer of the Indian Army who attempted to convince him to join a cavalry unit in the army. According to Singh, he was torn between settling in London with a woman named Julie or pursue a military career in India; however, after being allowed to take the Indian Military Academy entrance exam in England, and later the Indian government agreeing to pay for his journey back to India, Singh decided to join the army. He was later commissioned into the Deccan Horse regiment. In 1954, as an army officer, Singh led the Deccan Horse in the 1954 Republic Day parade. Singh later resigned from the army, stating that he wanted to work with his father-in-law, Chaudhary Raghvendra Singh, in his company, DLF, which was then known as Delhi Land & Finance and was founded in 1946.

== Business career ==
=== Early career and growth of DLF ===
After resigning from the army, Singh, together with another retired army officer, initially entered the stud farm business. He also started a battery company; however, the venture was unsuccessful and the losses from sustained from it caused Singh's creditors to take him to court. In 1960, Singh joined American Universal Electric Company and, after its merger with DLF Universal Limited (DLF) in 1979, he took over as the managing director with Chaudhary Raghuvender Singh. However, in 1975, Singh almost sold his shares in DLF for 25 lakhs after a decision made by his father-in-law Chaudhary Raghvendra and apathy regarding the real estate sector due to bureaucratic red tape, but Singh at the last minute declined to do the transaction, keeping his shares. In 1976, the Government of India introduced the Urban Land (Ceiling and Regulation) Act, 1976 (ULCRA) to grow low-income housing and set limits for the ownership of vacant urban land. The law received a backlash from people who had already invested in the urban land, including Singh, who took over a dormant DLF to attempt to secure exemptions for investors while studying the city’s limitations. He identified the Old-Gurgaon Road as a key link between Delhi's southern area and Haryana, that had not passed the ULCRA. DLF used the relaxed land acquisition laws as Singh revitalized the company, starting with its 30 acres and rapidly acquiring land from local landowners and farmers.

During the 1980s, Singh had a chance meeting with Rajiv Gandhi, who had then just entered politics and later became Prime Minister of India, after his car engine had overheated near Singh's property in Haryana. Singh met Rajiv and spoke about business plans for Gurgaon and how certain laws were hindering his acquisition of land in the state. Singh later had meetings with Rajiv, and Rajiv convinced his mother, then Indian prime minister Indira Gandhi, to change the Haryana land laws. DLF then received a license to develop land in 1981 and in 1983, the company received another license. During the early growth of DLF in the 1980s, Singh had a dispute with Bansi Lal, a senior politician who had also served as the Chief Minister of Haryana. Lal attempted to ruin Singh's business and even have him arrested, which led to Singh going into hiding on the advice then-Prime Minister Rajiv Gandhi. Lal also managed to persuade other Haryana politicians to go against Singh. However, Singh's friendship with Rajiv Gandhi eventually led to Lal stopping his attacks on Singh due to pressure from Rajiv Gandhi.

=== Established DLF ===
By the 1990s, several large foreign companies, including American Express, British Airways, IBM, and Nestle became tenants of DLF properties due to the growth in outsourcing. In 1995, Singh become chairmen of the company. Singh constructed numerous earthquake-proof office buildings, apartments, shopping malls and leisure facilities in Gurgaon. While he was the chairman of DLF, the company went for an initial public offering (IPO) in 2007 and made approximately US$2.24 billion, one of the largest IPOs in Indian history. Market capitalization of the company in 2007 increased to $24.5 billion, making Singh and his family one of the richest clans in the world. In the same year, Singh's Cyber City Gurgaon was awarded the world’s first LEED Platinum City and Community Certification. By 2015, Singh scaled DLF's land bank to 10,000 acres, the largest in India. In 2020, Singh retired from all of his executive positions in DLF, and he was succeeded as chairman of the company his son, Rajiv Singh.

=== Other business activities ===
Singh was also one of the initiators for General Electric’s (GE) entry into India during the 1980s. His initial work with GE involved bringing their gas turbines to India for infrastructure projects and later expanded to advising GE in other industries. Singh also had a key role in establishing India’s first inter-state gas pipeline project, the HBJ (Hazira, Bijeypur, Jagdishpur) pipeline, which was launched in 1986.

== Recognitions ==
- Decoration of Officer of the Order of Saint Charles, on 4 October 2010, conferred by Prince Albert II of Monaco for his contributions as Honorary Consul General of Monaco in Delhi for the previous two decades.
- Padma Bhusan award, on 26 January 2010, conferred by the Government of India.
- Recognition by Forbes magazine as the richest real estate baron and eighth richest person in the world, on 24 March 2008.
- The Samman Patra Award, in 2000, conferred by the Government of India for being one of the top taxpayers of Delhi region.
- Delhi Ratna Award, conferred by the Government of Delhi for his valuable contribution towards the development of Delhi.
- A special award conferred by NDTV at the Indian of the Year Award in 2008 for contributions towards India's economic growth.
- In 2011 he received the Entrepreneur of the Year award at The Asian Awards.
- Lifetime achievement award at EY Entrepreneur of the Year Award 2022, India
- Singh and Aparna Jain's book Why the Heck Not? was published in November 2024.

== Controversies ==
=== Political links ===
In the course of Singh's business career, his close links to the Indian National Congress political party and the party's leadership from the Nehru-Gandhi family has been a source of controversy for him. In 2016, Mosseck Fonseca, a Panamanian corporate service provider and law firm, stated that Singh qualified as a politically exposed person (PEP). In 2011, DLF's real estate deal with businessman Robert Vadra, the husband of Priyanka Gandhi and son-in-law of Sonia Gandhi, caused controversy for Singh, who was accused of corruption by then-political activist Arvind Kejriwal, who later became the Chief Minister of Delhi. Kejriwal accused Singh of doing a real estate transaction which heavily favored Vadra in return for political favors. In 2023, the Haryana government stated in the Punjab and Haryana High Court that there were no violations of rules or regulations in the real estate deal between Vadra and DLF.

=== SEBI sanctions ===
In 2014, the Securities and Exchange Board of India (SEBI) banned Singh, DLF and 6 others from accessing capital markets for a period of three years due to three violations, non-disclosure of related party transactions, non-disclosure of financial details related to subsidiaries, and inadequate disclosure of outstanding litigation during DLF's 2007 IPO process. In 2015, SEBI also imposed a heavy fine on Singh, DLF and others; however, DLF appealed SEBI's ruling and the case as of 2019, is in the Supreme Court of India.

=== Panama Papers ===
In April 2016, Singh's name featured in the list of high-profile names released in the Panama Papers, a set of 11.5 million confidential documents created by the Mossack Fonseca. Singh's son Rajiv, wife Indira, daughter Pia and her husband Timmy Sarna all set up offshore companies in the British Virgin Islands through Mossack Fonseca, and are named in the Panama Papers.

== Personal life and family ==
Singh was married to Indira Singh, the daughter of Raghvendra Singh, the founder of DLF. Indira died of cancer in 2018. Singh has one son, Rajiv Singh, and two daughters, Renuka Talwar and Pia Singh. In 2023, Singh stated in an interview that he is in a romantic relationship.

Singh's son, Rajiv, succeeded him as the chairman of DLF in 2020. Rajiv's wife Kavita Singh became an advisor to DLF Commercial Developers Ltd in November 2002. She was also appointed Advisor to DLF Universal on 1 June 2011, with a retainership fee of Rs 250,000 per month and other benefits. Rajiv and Kavita have two daughters, both of whom work for the company. K.P. Singh's elder daughter Renuka is married to G.S. Talwar, a non-executive director at DLF. Their son, Rahul, has joined DLF India Ltd as a "senior management trainee." K.P. Singh's younger daughter Pia Singh is a full-time director with DLF.
