= DLF (company) =

Indian commercial real estate developer pvt ltd

DLF Limited
- Type: Public
- Traded as: BSE: 532868; NSE: DLF
- ISIN: INE271C01023
- Industry: Real estate
- Founded: 4 July 1946
- Founder: Ch. Raghvendra Singh
- Headquarters: DLF Gateway Tower, Phase 3, Gurugram, Haryana, India
- Key people: Kushal Pal Singh (retd. Chairman); Rajiv Singh (Chairman)
- Products: Offices; Apartments; Shopping malls Hotels; Golf courses Infrastructure
- Revenue: ▲₹69.58 billion (US$740 million) (2024)
- Net income: ▲₹27.24 billion (US$290 million) (2024)
- Total assets: ▲₹602.62 billion (US$6.4 billion) (2024)
- Number of employees: 1,608 (excluding hotels; March 2019)
- Website: www.dlf.in

DLF Limited (formerly Delhi Land & Finance) is an Indian commercial real estate development company. It was founded by Chaudhary Raghvendra Singh in 1946, and it is based in Gurugram, Harayana,India. DLF has developed residential colonies in Delhi such as Model Town, Rajouri Garden, Krishna Nagar, South Extension, Greater Kailash, Kailash Colony, and Hauz Khas. DLF builds residential, office, and retail properties.

With the passage of the Delhi Development Act in 1957, the local government assumed control of real estate development and banned private real estate developers from Delhi proper. As a result, DLF began acquiring land at a relatively low cost outside the area controlled by the Delhi Development Authority, in the district of Gurgaon, and in the adjacent state of Haryana. In the mid-1970s, the company started developing their DLF City project at Gurgaon. This included hotels, infrastructure, and special economic zones-related development projects.

The company is headed by Rajiv Singh, who is the current chairman of the DLF Group. According to the Forbes listing of richest billionaires in 2023, Kushal Pal Singh, Chairman Emeritus, is the 19th richest man in India with a net worth of US$8.8 billion. The company's US$2 billion IPO in July 2007 was India's biggest IPO in history. In its first quarter results for the period ending 30 June 2007, the company reported a turnover of ₹31.2098 billion (US$330 million) and profit after taxes of ₹15.1548 billion (US$160 million).

As of 31 March 2012, the company had 128 million square metres (1,380 million square feet) of leased retail space across the country. In 2013–14, it leased out 0.28 million square metres (3 million square feet) of office space in India.

== History ==
DLF's first residential project was Krishna Nagar in East Delhi, which was completed in 1949. Subsequently, the company developed 21 colonies in Delhi, including Model Town, Rajouri Garden, Punjabi Bagh, South Extension, Greater Kailash, Kailash Colony and Hauz Khas. The passage of Delhi Development Act in 1957 was the first serious challenge to company's growth. The Act meant that the government would assume control of all real estate development activities in the city.

As a result, DLF decided to move beyond Delhi and focused on the suburb of Gurgaon in Haryana, which had the potential for development of residential and commercial properties. As DLF started to acquire land under the leadership of Chairman K.P. Singh, Gurgaon embarked on a period of rapid growth.

A ₹580 million (equivalent to ₹1.8 billion or US$19 million in 2026) deal was cancelled between DLF and Robert Vadra by IAS officer Ashok Khemka.

== Sponsorship ==
In 2008, DLF became the title sponsor of the Indian Premier League, a newly formed Twenty20 cricket league. DLF paid close to ₹2 billion (US$21 million) for the five-year sponsorship deal. The deal ended in the 2012 version of the season, wherein it was taken over by PepsiCo.

== Beyond buildings ==
Haryana Urban Development Authority (HUDA) and DLF, in a 50:50 joint venture, have completed work on a 16-lane, 10.5 km road network in Gurgaon. This stretch from NH8 Toll Plaza to Sector 55/56 in Gurgaon with six underpasses, one flyover and freeways has improved traffic management in the city. To create this infrastructure facility, DLF had engaged Parsons Brinckerhoff for project management consultancy and construction work had been awarded to IL&FS.

== Controversies ==
In August 2011, a penalty of ₹6.3 billion (US$67 million) was imposed on DLF by the Competition Commission of India (CCI) after finding DLF guilty of breaching laws regarding the unfair pricing of goods and services. The complaint was lodged against DLF by buyers in its residential projects Belaire & Park Place, located in Gurgaon. In February 2015, the CCI ordered its investigative arm to probe two more projects of DLF in Gurgaon, namely, DLF Regal Gardens and DLF Skycourt.

DLF land grab case pertains to the alleged illegal acquisition of 50 acres of land in Amipur village, Haryana, back in 2013, during Bhupinder Singh Hooda's tenure as Chief Minister under the Congress government. This matter has led to an investigation by the Central Bureau of Investigation involving Robert Vadra, Bhupinder Singh Hooda, and the DLF, as of around December 2017. DLF fined for late possession of flat in Kakkanad

== Constructed buildings ==
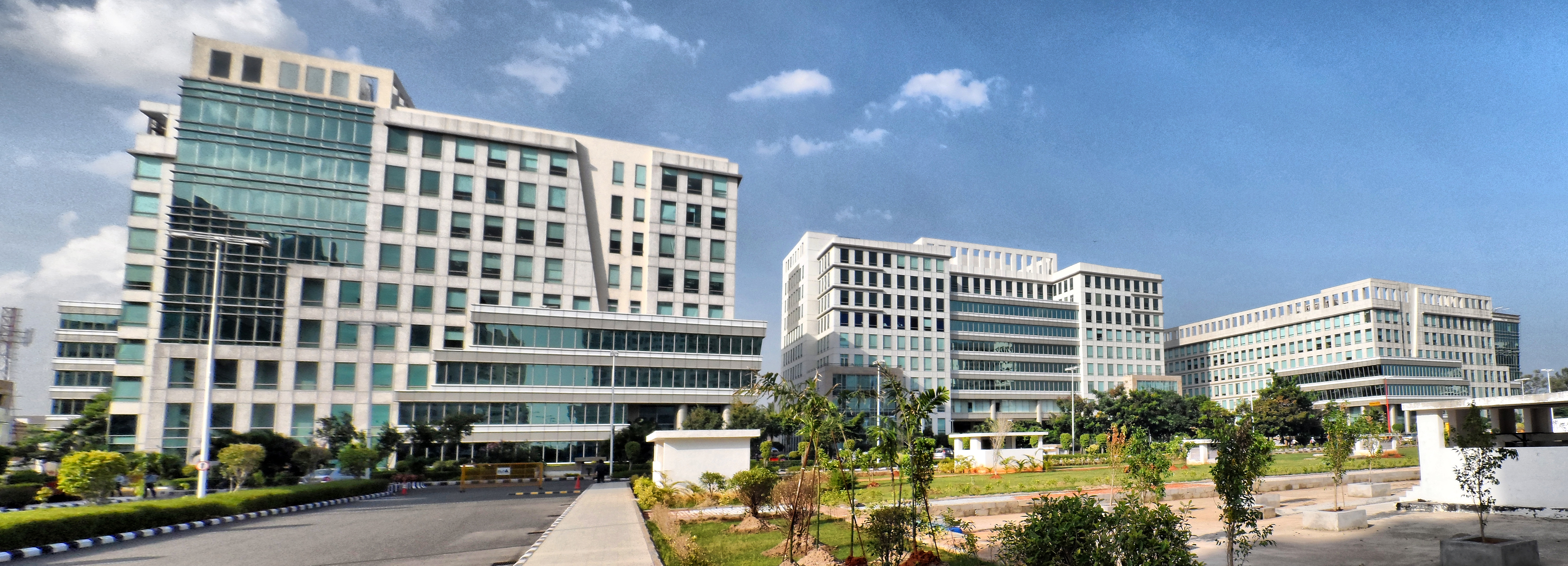
DLF Cybercity IT SEZ at Chennai
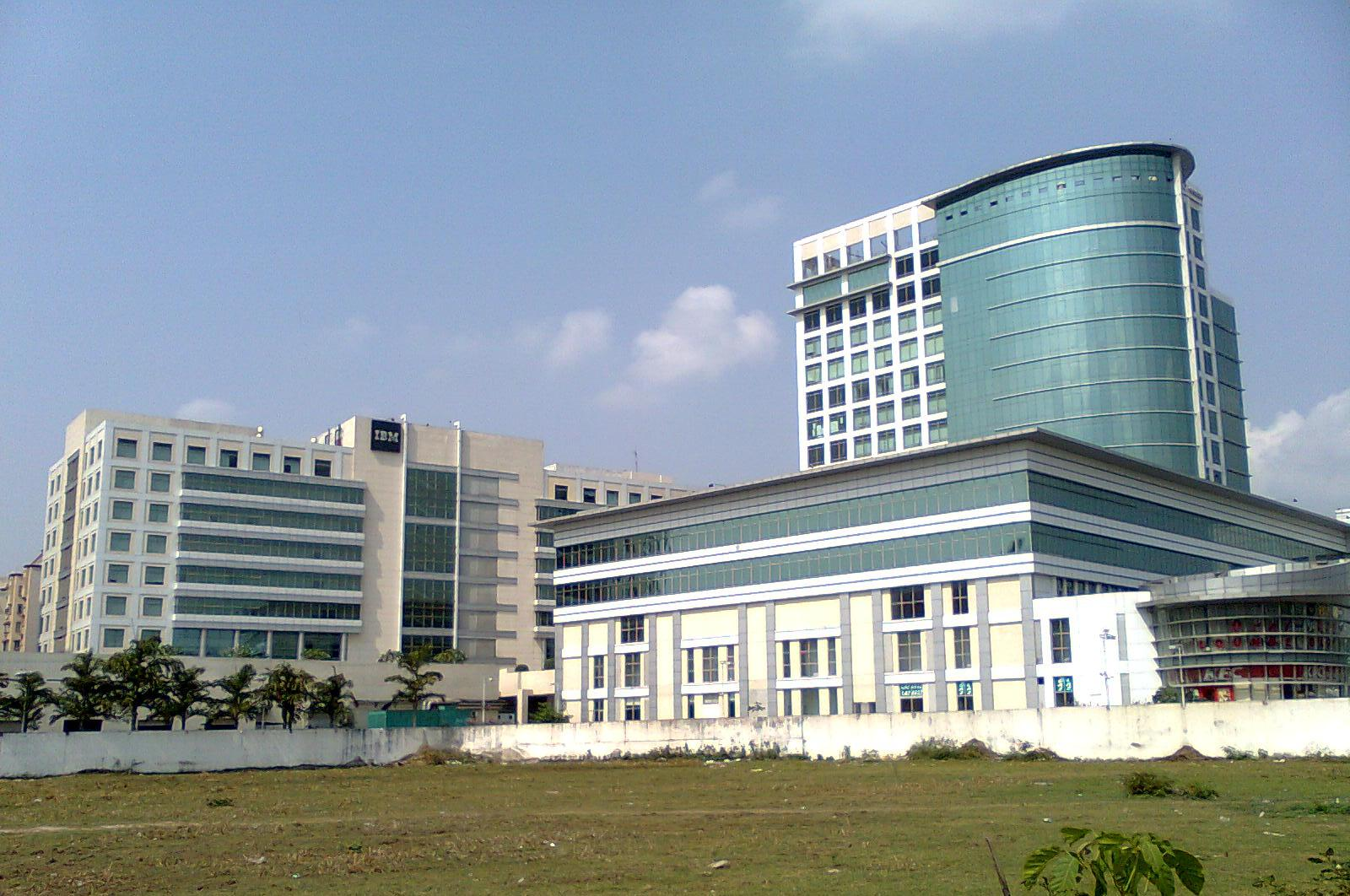
DLF IBM Kolkata (Tech Park)

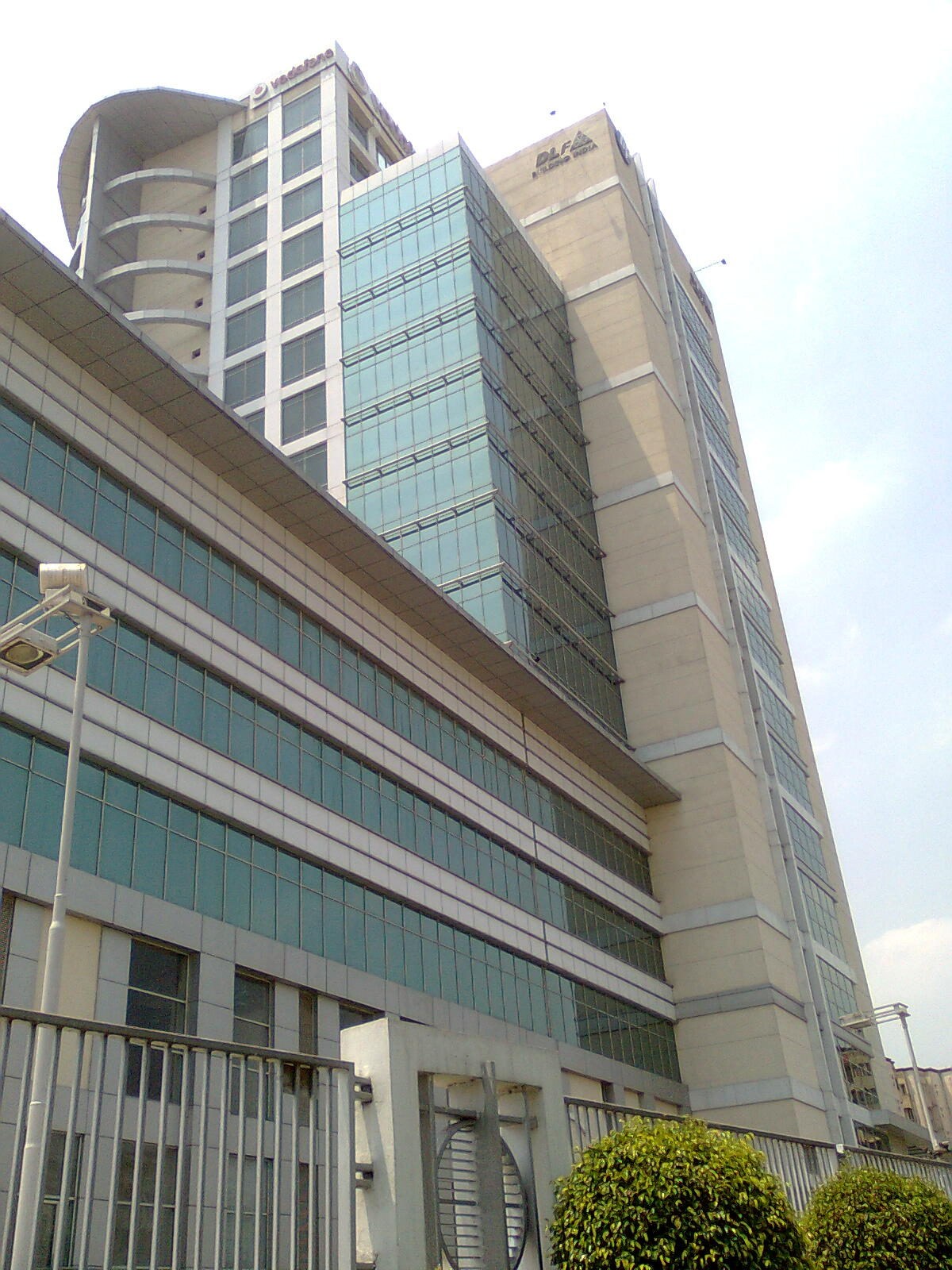
DLF IT Tech Park (IBM Kolkata)

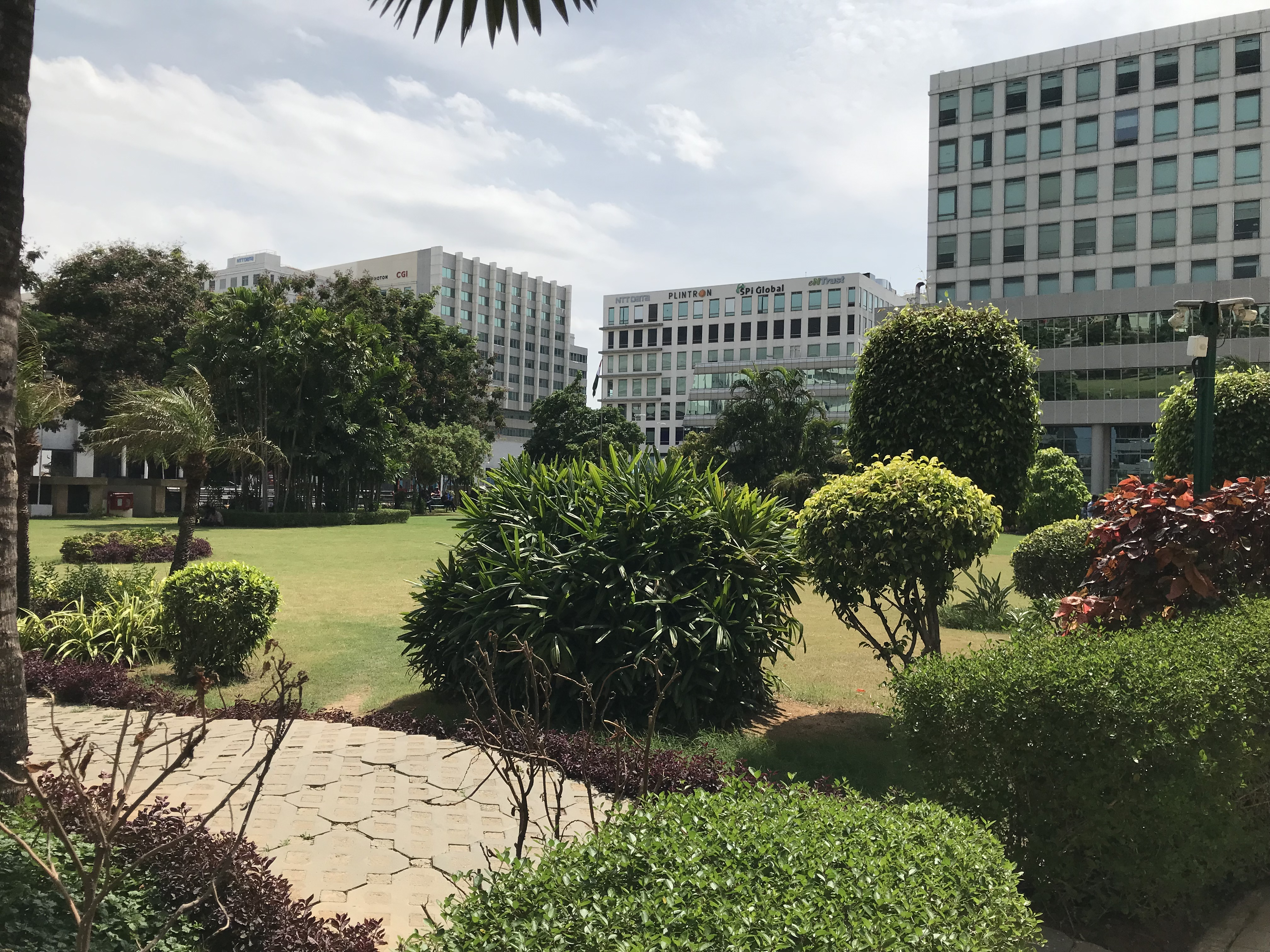
DLF Cybercity Chennai

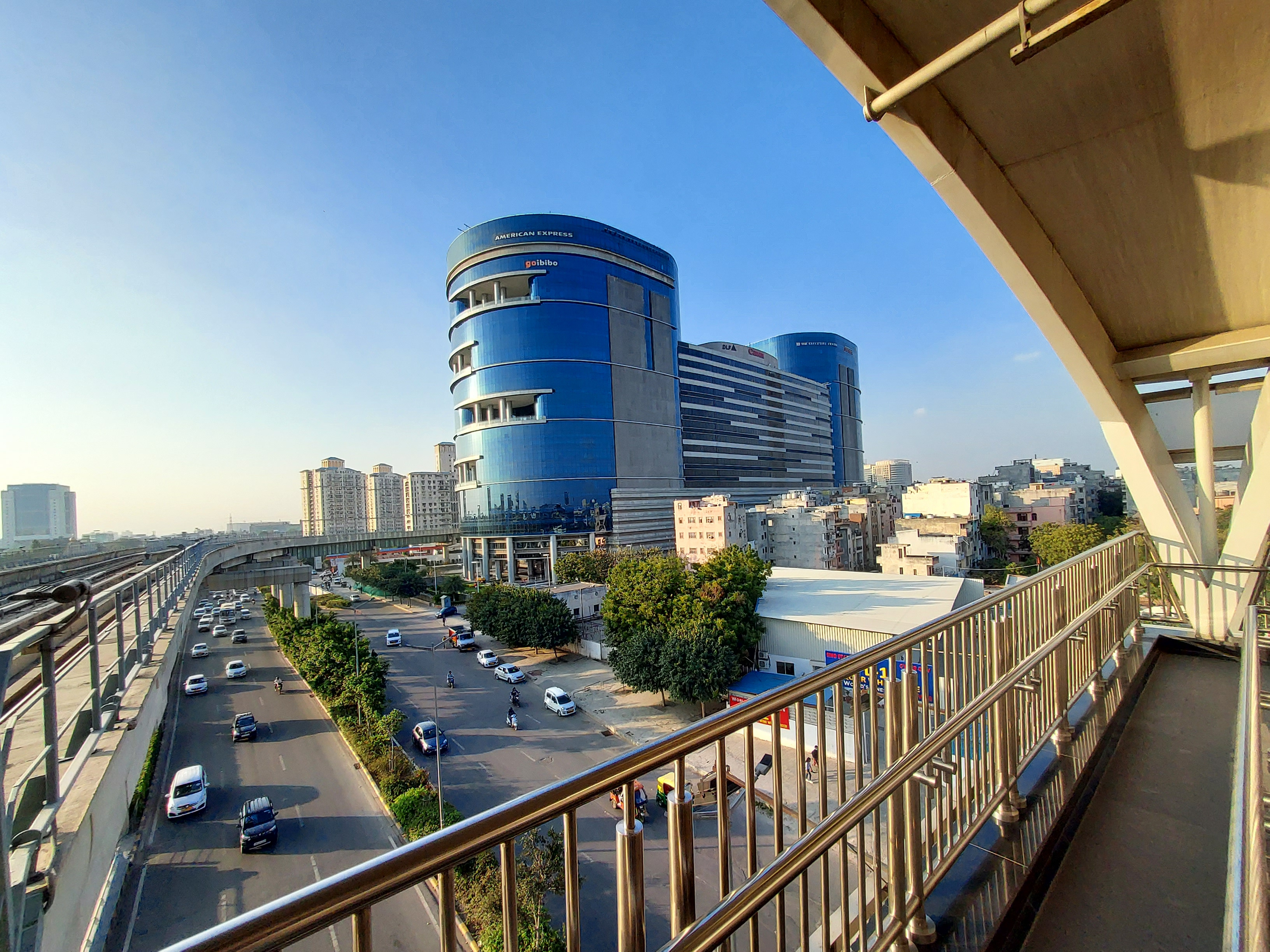
DLF Epitome Tower, Gurugram

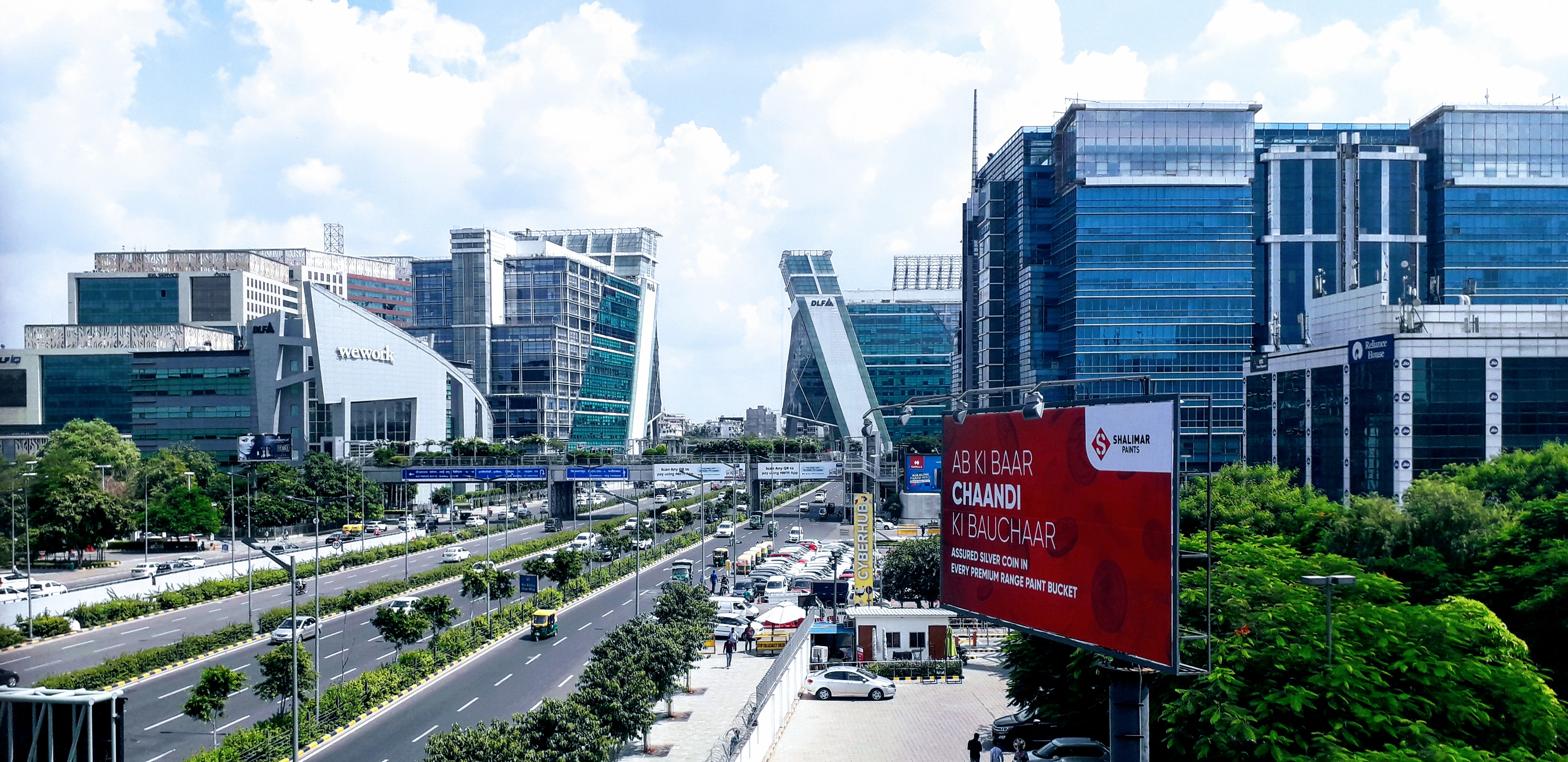
DLF Cyber City, Gurugram
