= Delhi Development Authority =

Government Authority Delhi

Type
- Type: Public

History
- Founded: 1957

Leadership
- Chairman: Vinai Kumar Saxena
- Vice Chairman: N. Saravana Kumar, IAS
- Headquarters: Vikas Sadan, INA, New Delhi – 110023

Website
- www.dda.gov.in

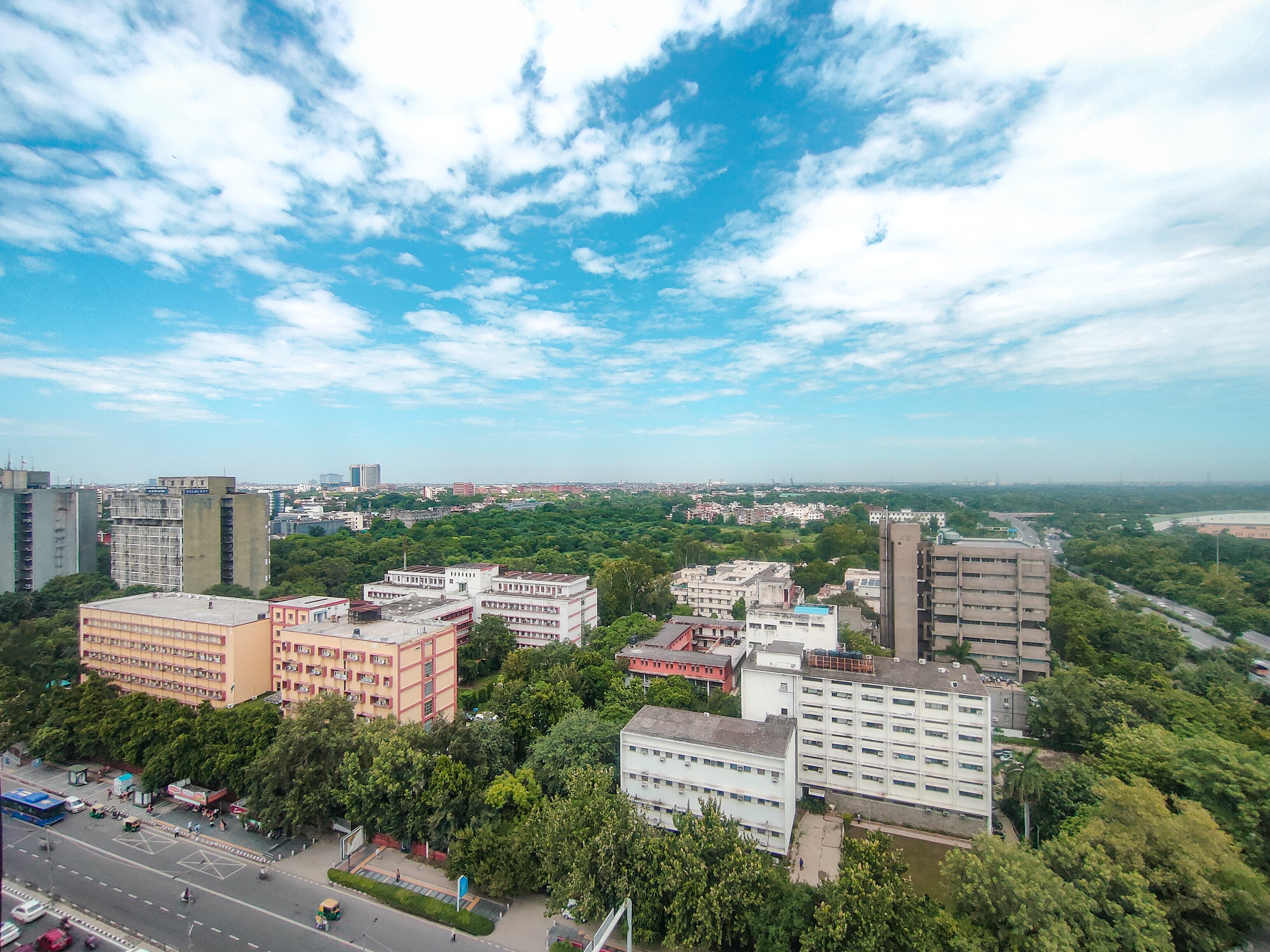
View from Vikas Minar, ITO. The majority of the offices of the Planning and Architecture Department, DDA are located here.

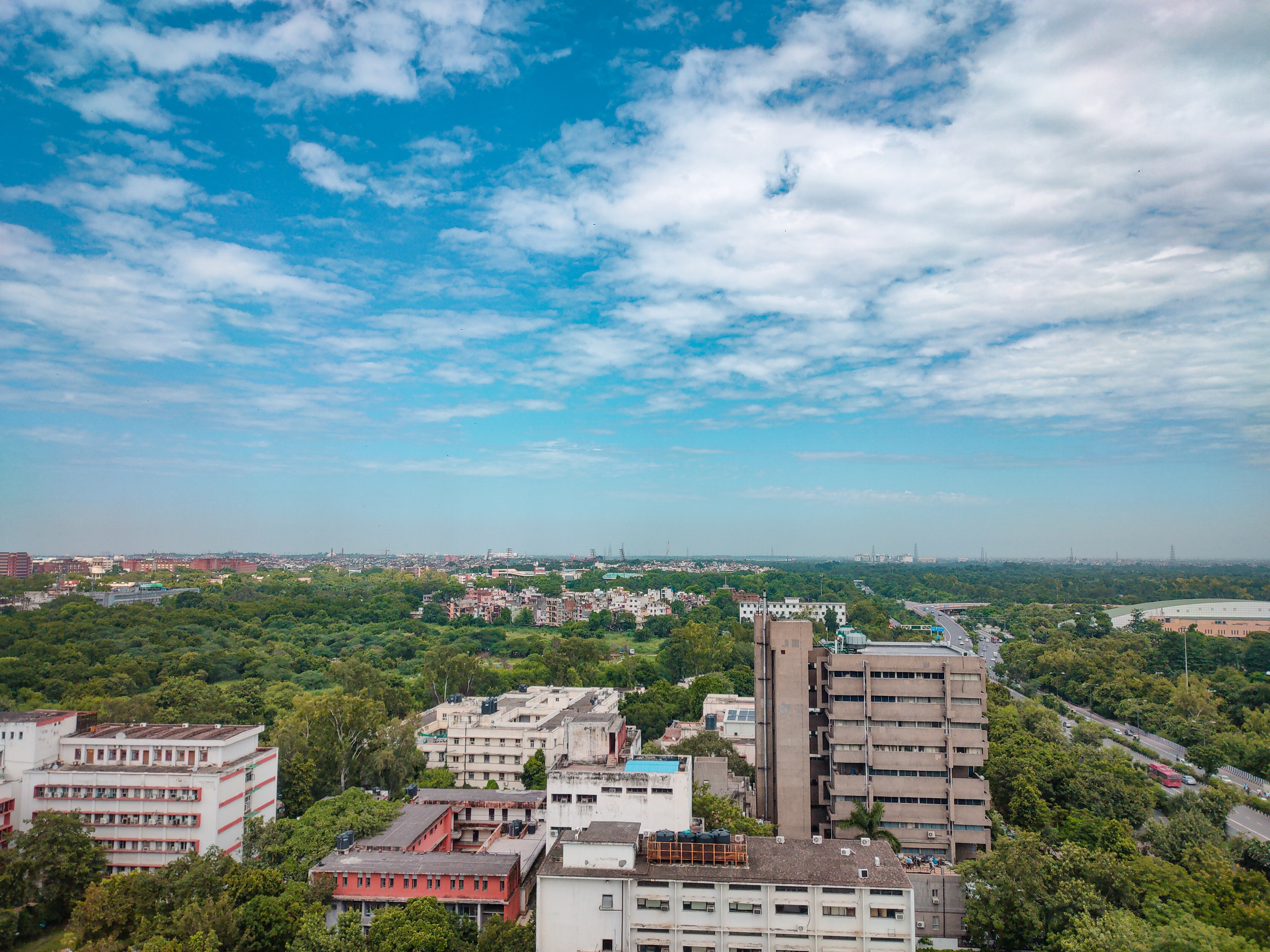
View from the 14th Floor, Vikas Minar, ITO.

The Delhi Development Authority (DDA) is a statutory body established under the Delhi Development Act, 1957, under the jurisdiction of the Ministry of Housing and Urban Affairs, Government of India to "promote and secure the development of Delhi". It is tasked with large-scale land acquisition for affordable housing in Delhi, as well as planning, development and construction of residential projects and commercial lands. Its responsibilities included providing public facilities like roads, bridges, drains, underground water reservoirs, community centres, sports centres, and green belts within the National Capital Territory of Delhi, India.

== History ==
=== British Raj ===
In 1922, a tiny Nazul Office consisting of 10 to 12 officials was set up in the Collectorate of Delhi, which was the first authority to regulate the planned development of the city. In 1937, the office was upgraded to an Improvement Trust, constituted under the provisions of the United Provinces Improvement Act, 1911, to control building operations and regulate land usage.

=== After Independence ===
India's independence in 1947 and resultant migration increased Delhi's population from 7 lakhs to 17 lakhs by 1951. All the open spaces were occupied by migrants. Civic services virtually collapsed. The 2 local bodies at that time, the Delhi Improvement Trust and Municipal Body, were not adequately equipped to cope with the changing scenario. Thus, to plan Delhi and to check its rapid and haphazard growth, the Central Government appointed a Committee under the chairmanship of Sh. G D. Birla in 1950. This Committee recommended a Single Planning & Controlling Authority for all the urban areas of Delhi. Consequently, the Delhi Development (Provisional) Authority - DDPA - was constituted by promulgating the Delhi (Control of Building Operations) Ordinance, 1955 with the primary objective of ensuring the development of Delhi by a plan. The aforementioned ordinance was replaced by the Delhi Development Act, 1957 and on 30 December 1957, the Delhi Development Authority acquired its present name and role.

== Master plans ==
The DDA master plan was formed in 1962 to ensure an organized and structured development of Delhi. This included the identification of new land that could be developed into residential properties and be made into self-contained colonies by providing ample commercial offices and retail complexes. The DDA master plan was revised in 1982 to formulate the Master Plan 2001 and then re-revised in 2007 to form the Delhi Master Plan 2021. The DDA is currently preparing its 4th master plan for the year of 2041.

== Housing ==
The development of housing projects by DDA commenced in 1967 with the construction of houses and providing basic amenities like electricity, water supply, sewage disposal along other infrastructure facilities. The new projects undertaken instigate recognition of project sites, a public announcement about the new DDA housing schemes in various categories through newspapers and other media advertisements, formal acceptance of the applications, a transparent draw system for short-listing of the applicants and finally allotment of the property.

Some popular DDA housing schemes of the past include the New Pattern Registration Scheme which offers home registration along with the property purchase, Janta Housing Registration Scheme which offers house registrations for the economically weaker section category and Ambedkar Awas Yojana allotted Janta, LIG & MIG (lower and middle-income group) category flats to the SC/ST registrants. The residential land is allotted to individual applicants, the farmers whose land is acquired for development and group housing societies through public auction.

=== 1985 housing scheme ===
The 1985 housing scheme was a scheme for people with low annual incomes. The scheme stated that each person can participate by paying Rs 3000 draft on a DDA account. The total cost of each house was Rs 35000; recipients had to pay the balance of the amount within a few months. The scheme was subject to criticism due to delays and perceived unequal treatment of applicants. After years of dispute, a new policy was instituted in 2019 requiring submission of a Rs 50,000 draft to the Delhi Urban Shelter Improvement Board or an appreciated reimbursement of 9000 Rs was offered.

== DDA Housing Scheme 2019 ==
In March 2019, DDA launched a new housing scheme, for around 18,000 flats situated in Vasant Kunj and Narela, which got a lukewarm response from the general public in terms of applications received. Most of the flats of this scheme situated at Narela was the surrendered flats of the earlier DDA Housing Scheme 2017. The results of the DDA Housing Scheme 2019 were announced in July 2019.

== Land development ==
The Delhi Development Authority acquires land for development in Delhi. So far, over 64,354.88 acres (260.4350 km^{2}) of land has been acquired with successful development projects on 59,504 acres (240.80 km^{2}) and 30,713.95 acres (124.2949 km^{2}) as residential land. Besides, the construction projects, DDA land development also includes providing a lush green belt and forest area for a clean and healthy environment by developing regional parks, neighbourhood parks, district parks, play fields, and sports complexes.

== Commercial properties ==
DDA undertakes the construction, development and maintenance of commercial properties like retail shops in local markets, shopping complexes, office complexes, makeshift industrial setups, hospitals, community halls, clubs, educational institutions, religious segregation centres etc. These properties are disposed of through auctions or tenders.

== Sports complexes ==
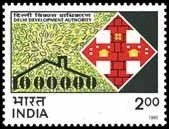
Stamp of India 1995 Delhi Development Authority

Delhi Development Authority (DDA) aims to provide an entire network of sports facilities through sports complexes, play fields, multi-facility gymnasiums and fitness centres, golf courses etc. DDA provides the basic infrastructure facilities, coaching through the top sportspersons in India, providing stipends and kits and other facilities to identify and train budding sports talent in Delhi.

Besides this DDA also conducts various talent hunt schemes through its Sports Complexes in Dwarka, Saket, Hari Nagar and other areas, including Yamuna Sports Complex and Siri Fort Sports Complex. DDA Dwarka Sports Complex along with DDA Saket Sports Complex plans to host State Level tournaments to provide a platform to professional and amateur sportspeople to showcase their talent.

A list of all the sports complexes in Delhi is as follows:

List of sports complexes in Delhi
S. No.	District	Name
1	East Delhi	CWG Village Sports Complex
1	East Delhi	Chilla Sports Complex, Vasundhara Enclave
1	East Delhi	Poorvi Delhi Khel Parisar, Dilshad Garden
1	East Delhi	East Vinod Nagar Sports Complex, East Vinod Nagar
1	East Delhi	Yamuna Sports Complex, Surajmal Vihar
2	North Delhi	Major Dhyan Chand Sports Complex, Ashok Vihar
2	North Delhi	Rashtriya Swabhiman Khel Parisar, Pitampura
2	North Delhi	Rohini Sports Complex, Rohini
3	South Delhi	Netaji Subhash Sports Complex, Jasola
3	South Delhi	Saket Sports Complex, Saket
3	South Delhi	Siri Fort Sports Complex (Khelgaon), Siri Fort
3	South Delhi	Vasant Kunj Sports Complex, Vasant Kunj
4	West Delhi	Dwarka Sports Complex, Dwarka
4	West Delhi	Hari Nagar Sports Complex, Hari Nagar
4	West Delhi	Paschim Vihar Sports Complex, Paschim Vihar
-	Golf Courses	Qutab Golf Course, Lado Sarai
-	Golf Courses	Bhalswa Lake Golf Course, Mukundpur
