= Currimbhoy Ebrahim =

Indian businessman

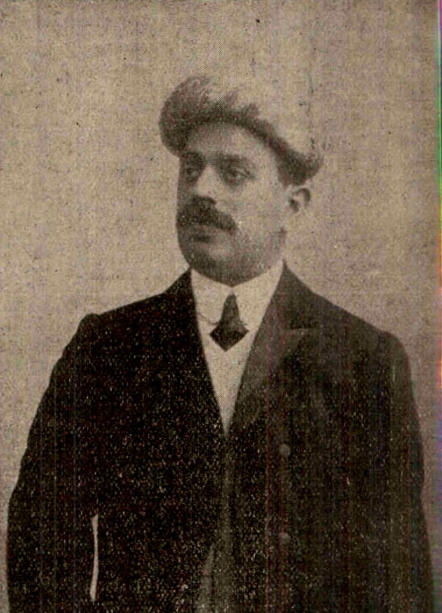

Sir Fazalbhoy Currimbhoy Ebrahim, 1st Baronet CBE (25 October 1839 – 26 September 1924) was an Indian businessman based in Bombay. He is credited with founding E. Pabaney & Co, the family held trading and ship owning company whose trading interests extended as far as the Arabian Peninsula, the African coast and China.

The family was based in Bombay, and had been active in Canton (the capital city of the Guangdong Province in southern China) before the Opium War. Ships belonging to their company, E. Pabaney & Co., traded between India, Africa, China, Hong Kong and the far East. They continued to maintain a considerable stake in the opium trade through E. Pabaney & Co, with branch offices springing up in Hong Kong and Shanghai during the latter half of the 19th century.

== Personal life ==
Fazalbhoy Currimbhoy Ebrahim was born into a Gujarati family into a Ismaili Khoja Muslim community, who are the disciples of the Aga Khan in Bombay on 25 October 1839. His father was an established ship owner and their family had been active traders for generations.

At the age of 16, Currimbhoy started E.Pabaey, a trading company, with the help of his father and extended family. He married twice, and had 10 children through his first marriage with Bai Foolbai Gangji and 11 children through his second marriage to Bai Foolbia Sajan.

== Career and E. Pabaney ==
Currimbhoy established E. Pabaney in 1856 in Bombay as a trading company. In 1857, it opened an office in Hong Kong on Duddell street for trading in opium, yarn, cotton, silk and tea, and soon set up offices all over the far east.

Ships belonging to their company, E. Pabaney & Co., traded between India, Africa, China, Hong Kong and the far East. In Shanghai, the company was listed as the "8 Bali Foreign company (八巴利洋行 / bā bālì yángháng). In 1903, the company established itself in Singapore for the trading of opium and yarn.

(The current E Pabaney company, registered in India, is entirely unrelated to this history.)

== Honours and philanthropy ==
Currimbhoy was knighted during the Prince and Princess of Wales's Indian tour of 1905 and created a baronet in 1910 and further granted lands to support that dignity by the Currimbhoy Ebrahim Baronetcy Act 1913 following the precedent set by the Cowasji Jehangir Baronetcy Act.

Between 1947 and 1949, due to the partition of India, this descendants, namely the third and fourth baronets migrated to Pakistan. The Currimbhoy Ebrahim Orphanage trust started by him, continue to own large pieces of land in and around Mumbai, including Currimbhoy Manor (Bhulabhai Desai Road, Bombay) and the Poona bungalow (Pune).

An orphanage, Currimbhoy Ebrahim Yateemkhana, on Altamount Road, Cumbala Hill, Bombay, founded by him in 1895 and run by the trust, was sold to Mukesh Ambani in 2002 for the building of a 27 storied residence for the Ambani family, called Antilia.

Baronetage of the United Kingdom
New creation	Baronet (of Pabaney Villa); 1910–1924	Succeeded by Mahomedbhoy Currimbhoy Ebrahim
