= Lodha Group =

Indian real estate company

Lodha
- Formerly: Macrotech Developers (2021–2025)
- Type: Public
- Traded as: NSE: LODHA; BSE: 543287
- ISIN: INE670K01029
- Industry: Real estate & Construction
- Founded: 1980; 46 years ago
- Founder: Mangal Prabhat Lodha
- Area served: Worldwide
- Key people: Abhishek Lodha (CEO & MD)
- Products: Residential real estate, commercial real estate, digital infrastructure
- Services: Real estate development, Property leasing
- Revenue: ▲₹16,676.2 crore (US$1.8 billion) (FY2026)
- Operating income: ▲₹4,920 crore (US$530 million) (FY2026)
- Net income: ▲₹3,430.7 crore (US$370 million) (FY2026)
- Total assets: ▲₹58,936.6 crore (US$6.3 billion) (FY2026)
- Total equity: ▲₹23,429.2 crore (US$2.5 billion) (FY2026)
- Number of employees: 5,836 (2026)
- Website: www.lodhagroup.com

Lodha or Lodha Developers Limited (formerly known as Macrotech Developers Limited) is an Indian multinational real estate and construction company headquartered in Mumbai. It was founded in 1980 by Mangal Prabhat Lodha. It has developed residential and commercial properties in Mumbai, Thane, Hyderabad, Pune, Bengaluru and London.

Some of its notable projects include Lodha Altamount, Lodha World Towers, Lodha Bellissimo, Trump Tower Mumbai, Lodha Park, Lodha Malabar, No. 1 Grosvenor Square and Lodha Belmondo. The company is also credited for developing Palava, an integrated smart city in Dombivli near Mumbai. The company was listed as Macrotech Developers on 19 April 2021.

Macrotech Developers Limited was renamed Lodha Developers Limited on 16 June 2025. As of 2025, Lodha Group had a market capitalisation of approximately ₹119,000 crore ($14.3 billion).

== History ==
Lodha Group was founded in by 1980 by Mangal Lodha, a businessman and politician, who serves as Member of Legislative Assembly. Abhishek Lodha, the company's current CEO, joined the firm in 2003 after working in the US as a consultant at McKinsey & Company and subsequently assumed leadership roles within the organisation.

In September 2007, the Deutsche Bank made an investment of ₹1,640 crore (US$175 million) by subscribing to the compulsorily convertible debentures (CCDs) of Lodha's subsidiary, Cowtown Land Development Limited.

In May 2010, the company emerged the highest bidder to acquire a 22.5-acre plot in Wadala, Mumbai, for ₹4,053 crore (US$433 million) from Mumbai Metropolitan Region Development Authority (MMRDA).

In December 2012, Lodha Group acquired Washington House, a residential building owned by the US consulate on Altamont Road, for ₹341.82 crore (US$37 million) which was developed into Lodha Altamount.

It purchased 17 acres of land in Mumbai's prime location from DLF for about ₹2,700 crore (US$288 million), nearly four times higher than the price at which DLF had bought the land in 2005.

In November 2013, Lodha Group bought Macdonald House, London, a seven-storey building in central London from the Government of Canada for ₹3,120 crore (US$333 million). The company acquired 87 acres of land in Thane from Clariant Chemicals India for ₹1,102.5 crore (US$118 million).

It received an investment of ₹425 crore (US$45 million) from Piramal Fund Management for one of the company's projects in May 2016.

In September 2019, reports indicated that Lodha Group had agreed to sell approximately 700,000 square feet of office space in Mumbai, India to Singapore-based Varde Partners for about ₹1,100 crore (US$118 million). Earlier, Lodha sold its 29-storey office building in Mumbai's Wadala for ₹1,350 crore (US$144 million) to Tata Group's retail arm Trent.

In Q3 of 2020, India Ratings and Research (Ind-Ra) and Moody's upgraded the rating for Lodha to stable. After getting listed on stock exchange, Moody's Investors Service changed the outlook on the ratings to positive from stable in April 2021.

The company launched its initial public offering on 7 April 2021. It got listed on National Stock Exchange of India and Bombay Stock Exchange on 19 April 2021.

In September 2021, Tata Power entered into a partnership agreement with the group for setting up EV charging stations in housing societies and offices. In 2022, the company partnered with Bain Capital and Ivanhoé Cambridge to establish a logistics and industrial real estate platform, with an investment of about $1 billion. In the same year, the group acquired a 1.10-acre land parcel in the Bund Garden area of Pune from Poonawalla Constructions LLP for about ₹80 crore.

The group entered the Bengaluru housing market in 2022 and initially operated through a pilot phase. By 2024–25, Lodha Group's Bengaluru operations had moved beyond an initial pilot phase and reported around ₹1,400 crore in pre-sales from the city. In December 2025, the company entered the Delhi–National Capital Region market through a partnership with MRG Group to develop two projects in Gurgaon, with a reported revenue potential of ₹3,600 crore.

Lodha Group entered the data center and digital infrastructure business at Palava. In late 2024, Amazon Web Services acquired a 38.18-acre land parcel in Palava from Lodha for approximately ₹450 crore to develop a hyperscale data center, with the transaction being registered on 12 November 2024.

In August 2025, the Lodha Foundation established the Lodha Mathematical Sciences Institute in Mumbai, a privately funded research institute focused on mathematics.

Singapore-based STT Global Data Centres acquired over 24 acres of land in the Palava region of Mumbai from Lodha for about ₹500 crore, in September 2025. In January 2026, at the World Economic Forum in Davos, Switzerland, the company signed a memorandum of understanding with the Maharashtra government to invest ₹1.3 trillion (₹1 lakh crore plus an earlier ₹30,000 crore commitment) to develop a 2.5 gigawatt data center park at Palava under the government's Green Integrated Data Centre Park policy.

In May 2026, the Lodha Foundation launched the Lodha Theoretical Physics Institute (LTPI) in Mumbai, with theoretical physicist Jainendra K. Jain serving as its founding director.

== Partnership ==
In September 2013, Lodha Group partnered with Donald Trump for the development of Trump Tower, Mumbai, an 800-ft-tall, 77-storey residential tower at Lower Parel, Mumbai. Lodha Group has partnered with a number of celebrities to be brand ambassadors, including Aishwarya Rai, Amitabh Bachchan, Akshay Kumar and Twinkle Khanna.

== Financials ==
The company recorded consolidated revenue from operations of ₹16,676.2 crore in FY2025–26, compared with ₹13,779.5 crore in the previous financial year. Its EBITDA stood at ₹4,920 crore, while profit after tax increased to ₹3,430 crore from ₹2,770 crore in FY2024–25.

In FY2024–25, Lodha Developers reported total income of ₹14,169.8 crore, compared with ₹10,469.5 crore in the previous year. Its net profit was ₹2,764.3 crore, up from ₹1,549.1 crore, while the net profit margin increased from 15% to 20%. The company's annual pre-sales reached ₹17,630 crore in FY2024–25, exceeding its guidance of ₹17,500 crore. Its net debt stood at ₹3,990 crore at the end of March 2025, with a net debt-to-equity ratio of 0.20.

== Sustainability ==
In 2021, the company worked with the Rocky Mountain Institute to develop a roadmap for achieving carbon neutrality in its operations by 2035. In 2023, it ranked first among residential developers in Asia in the Global Real Estate Sustainability Benchmark (GRESB) Development Benchmark, with a score of 100. Lodha has been a founding member of the Indian Green Building Council since 2007 and has adopted its green building ratings for residential projects in the Mumbai Metropolitan Region and Pune.

In 2024, Lodha reported an 82% reduction in its Scope 1 and Scope 2 emissions, primarily through the adoption of renewable energy. The company's net-zero targets were validated by the Science Based Targets initiative (SBTi). In the same year, the company ranked sixth globally and first in India among real estate developers in the Corporate Sustainability Assessment conducted by S&P Global.

== Controversies ==
A buyer of Lodha Group's Wadala project flat published YouTube videos claiming irregularities by the company. The company filed suit for defamation but the right to an injunction was struck down.

In January 2025, Macrotech Developers (now, Lodha Developers) filed a ₹5,000 crore trademark lawsuit against House of Abhinandan Lodha in the Bombay High Court over use of the "Lodha" name. The dispute was settled in April 2025, with Macrotech retaining exclusive rights to "Lodha" and "Lodha Group", while House of Abhinandan Lodha operates independently under its own brand.

== Awards and recognition ==
- In 2025, Lodha was listed among Newsweek's "World's Most Trustworthy Companies".
- In 2024, Lodha Group ranked third overall among 300 companies in the Urban Benchmark published by the World Benchmarking Alliance and was placed first within the real estate industry globally.
- In 2024, it was named one of the 'Best Organisations for Women' by The Economic Times.
- In 2024, Lodha ranked 63rd in the Kantar BrandZ Most Valuable Indian Brands list, with a brand value of US$1.9 billion.
- In 2023, it received the 10th CII-IGBC Green Champion Award from the Indian Green Building Council in the category of “Developer Leading the Green Homes Movement in India".
- In 2021, the company's luxury segment, Lodha Luxury, received the "Iconic Luxurious Real Estate Brand of the Year" award at the Times Real Estate Conclave & Awards.
- 'Top Developer of the Year' for the project, Lodha World Towers at the Times Real Estate Icons West India by The Times of India (2020)
- Lodha World Towers of Lodha Group received recognition as 'Project of the Year' and 'Top Super Luxury' segment homes and Palava City was recognised as 'Top Township Project' at the Times Real Estate Icons of West India (2020)
- Lodha Group's CEO & MD Abhishek Lodha was named 'Real Estate Youth Icon of the Year 2019' award at Grohe Hurun Real Estate Leadership Summit (2019)
- Outstanding Project of the Year (National Category) for Palava at Golden Brick Awards, Dubai (2019)
- CNBC Awaaz Real Estate Award for the project, Lodha Altamount by CNBC (2018)
- Global Leadership in Real Estate Award at NDTV Property Awards by NDTV (2014)
- CNBC Awaaz Real Estate Award for the project, Lodha Bellezza by CNBC (2013)

== See also ==
- List of tallest buildings in India
- List of tallest buildings in Mumbai
