= Mangal Lodha =

Indian businessman and politician (born 1955)

Mangal Prabhat Lodha
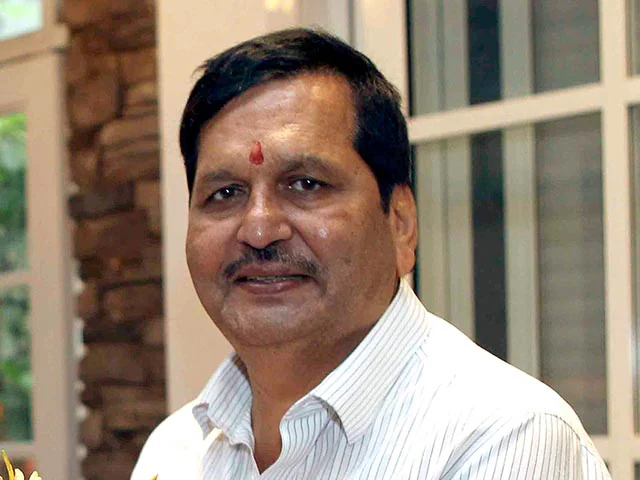

Minister of Skill Development and Entrepreneurship Government of Maharashtra
- Incumbent
- Assumed office 9 August 2022
- Chief Minister: Devendra Fadnavis; Eknath Shinde
- Preceded by: Rajesh Tope

Minister of Tourism Government of Maharashtra
- In office 9 August 2022 – 2 July 2023
- Chief Minister: Eknath Shinde
- Preceded by: Aaditya Thackeray
- Succeeded by: Girish Mahajan

Minister of Woman and Child Development Government of Maharashtra
- In office 9 August 2022 – 2 July 2023
- Chief Minister: Eknath Shinde
- Preceded by: Yashomati Thakur
- Succeeded by: Aditi Tatkare

President of Bharatiya Janata Party – Mumbai
- In office 16 July 2019 – 12 August 2022
- President: Chandrakant Patil
- Preceded by: Ashish Shelar
- Succeeded by: Ashish Shelar

Member of the Maharashtra Legislative Assembly
- Incumbent
- Assumed office 1995
- Preceded by: Balwant Desai
- Constituency: Malabar Hill

Personal details
- Born: 1 December 1955 (age 70) Jodhpur, Rajasthan, India
- Party: Bharatiya Janata Party
- Spouse: Manju Lodha
- Children: 2
- Parent: Guman Mal Lodha (father)
- Education: Bachelor of Commerce, Bachelor in Law – University of Jodhpur
- Occupation: Businessman & Politician
- Website: mangalprabhatlodha.com

Mangal Prabhat Lodha (born December 1955) is an Indian billionaire businessman and politician. He is the minister of the Ministry of Skill Development and Entrepreneurship (Maharashtra). He was the president of Bharatiya Janata Party's Mumbai unit. He is the founder of the Macrotech Developers, a Mumbai-based real estate developer. He is also the Member of the Legislative Assembly representing the Malabar Hill constituency of South Mumbai. According to Forbes, as of June 2024 he was ranked 14th richest in India, with a net worth of about US$13.5 billion.

In October 2024, Lodha was ranked 19th on Forbes list of India's 100 richest tycoons, with a net worth of $11.4 billion.

== Early life and education ==
Mangal Prabhat Lodha was born and brought up in a Marwari Jain family in Jodhpur. His father Guman Mal Lodha was an independence activist and was former chief justice of the Guwahati High Court. He is married to Manju Lodha and has two children. Lodha completed his B.Com and LLB from the University of Jodhpur and practised law in the Jodhpur High Court. Once his father was appointed a judge in the same court, he moved his practice.

In 1981, he moved to Mumbai and laid the foundation of the Lodha Group.

== Career in real estate development ==
Lodha's firm, Macrotech Developers (erstwhile Lodha Developers), has multiple projects under construction, including the Mumbai luxury high-rise World One. The company invested over $1 billion in developing the township New Cuffe Parade. The company is run by his elder son, Abhishek Lodha. Lodha Developers' shares started trading on NSE (National Stock Exchange) and BSE (Bombay Stock Exchange) on 19 April 2021.

His younger son, Abhinandan Lodha founded Lodha Ventures in 2015 and The House of Abhinandan Lodha which was founded in 2021.

== Political career ==
Lodha was an active member of the Akhil Bharatiya Vidhyarthi Parishad in his youth.

Lodha has been the MLA of Maharashtra Vidhan Sabha, representing the Malabar Hill constituency for seven consecutive terms since 1995, after beating the then incumbent Balwant Desai of the Indian National Congress.

As a legislator, Lodha played a role in the introduction of the Right to Information Act (RTI) in the Maharashtra Vidhan Sabha. He helped set up the Animal Welfare Board in Maharashtra and has proposed a law against cow slaughter in the state.

In 2014, he proposed the building of a coastal freeway from Nariman Point to Virar and from Nariman Point to Ghatkopar through Eastern Freeway.
