= Cumbala Hill =

Hill and neighborhood in South Mumbai

Coordinates: 18°57′57″N 72°48′21″E

- Neighbourhood
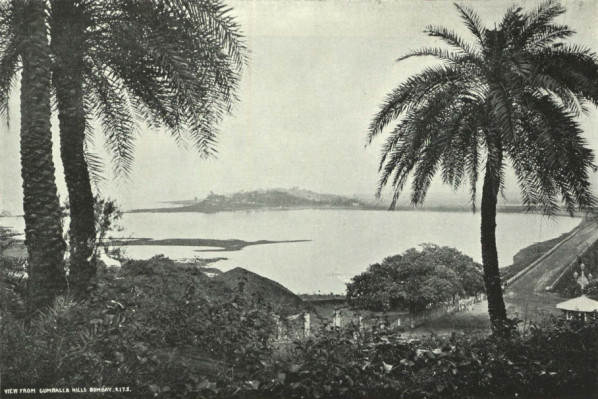
- A view from Cumballa Hill, c. 1905

- Location within Mumbai
- Country: India
- State: Maharashtra
- District: Mumbai City
- City: Mumbai

Government
  - Type: Municipal Corporation
  - Body: Brihanmumbai Municipal Corporation (MCGM)
- Elevation: 56 m (184 ft)

Languages
  - Official: Marathi
- Time zone: UTC+5:30 (IST)
- Area code: 022
- Civic agency: BMC

Cumbala Hill (also spelled Cumballa) is a hill and upmarket neighbourhood in South Mumbai flanked by the sea on the West, Altamount Road on the East, Malabar Hill on the South and Mahalaxmi on the North. It is also called Diplomat's Hill or Ambassador's Row by residents, as many consulates and high commissions are located in the area. The hill is at an elevation of 56 metres (184 ft).

== Etymology ==
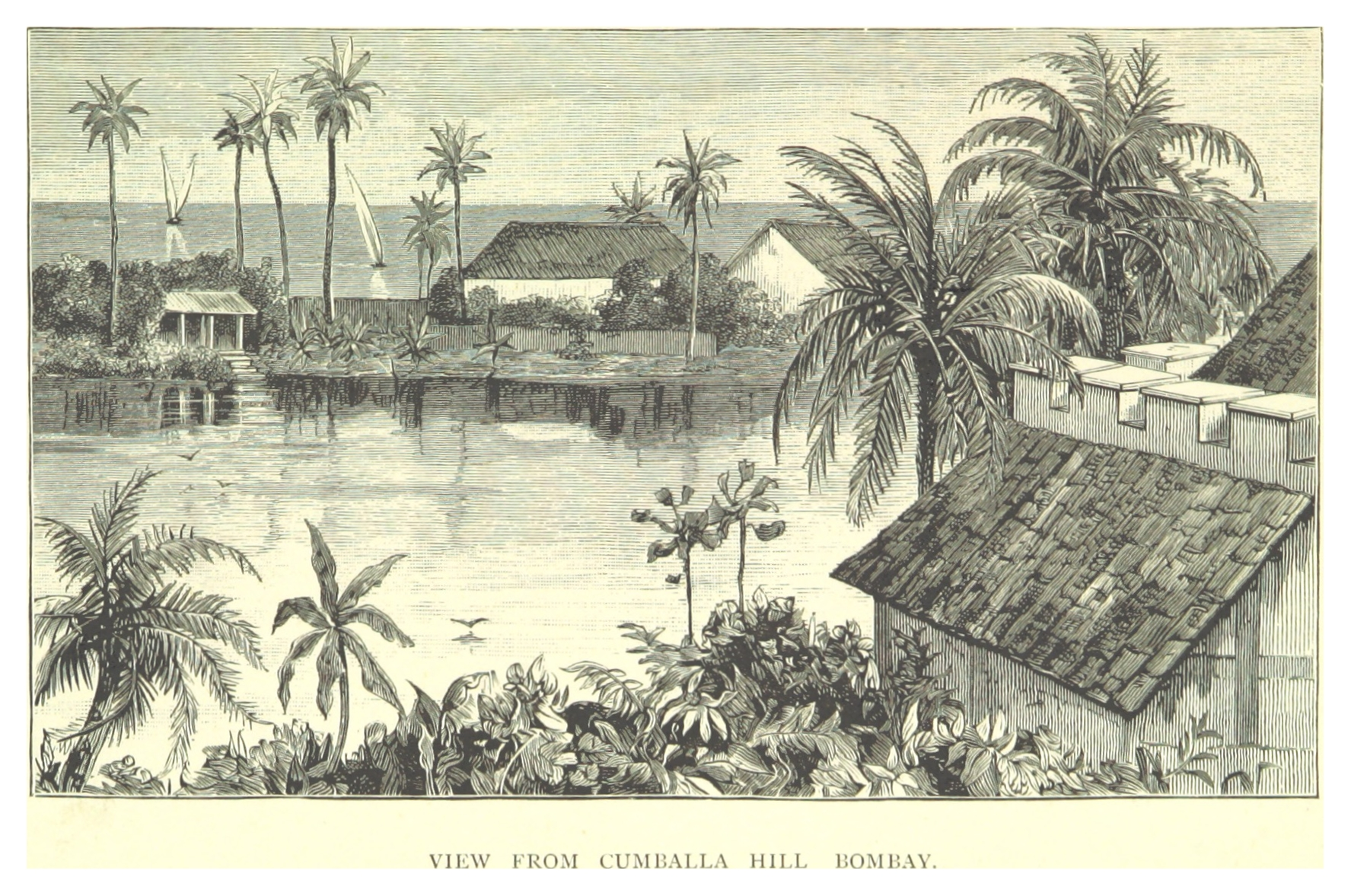
View of Bombay from Cumballa Hill published in 1882.

According to Richard M. Eaton, the name Cumbala Hill likely derives from Kambata in Ethiopia from where enslaved African Habshis were brought to India in medieval times.

== History ==
There are two British-era milestones that were once used to guide horse carriages are present in the locality.

== Characteristics ==
Along with nearby Malabar Hill, Cumbala Hill is home to the largest number of billionaires in Mumbai, as well hosts residences of prominent ministers. Billionaire Mukesh Ambani's $1.5 billion home Antilia is located here as well as numerous bungalows dating back to the British Raj.

Cumballa Hill Hospital was reopened in 2019 after closing down in 2017.

== See also ==
- Breach Candy
