= Lodha Altamount =

Residential building in Mumbai

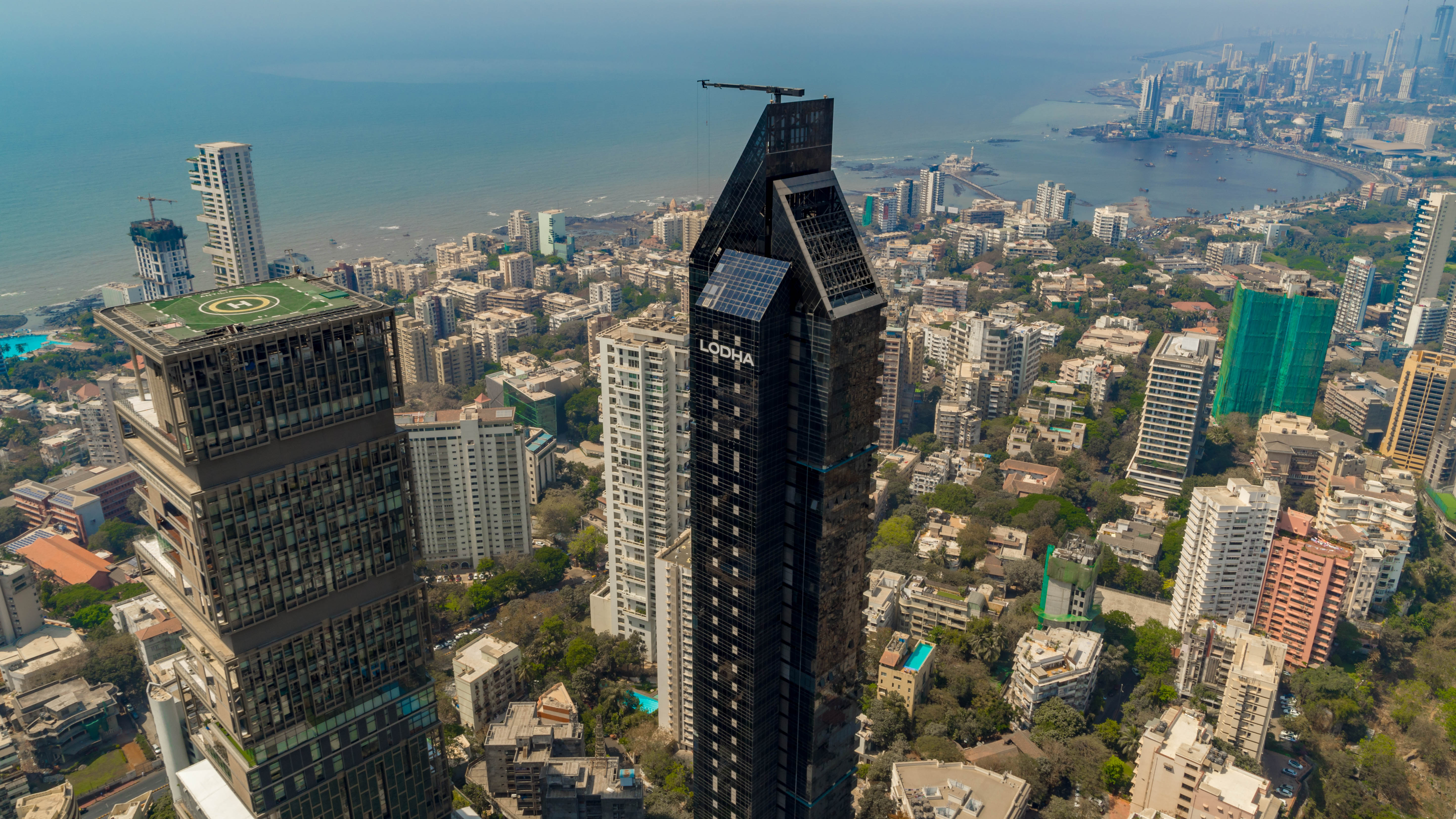

General information
- Status: Completed
- Type: Luxury Residential Skyscraper
- Architectural style: Post Modern
- Location: Altamount Road, Mumbai, India, India
- Coordinates: 18°58′05.9304″N 72°48′37.5084″E
- Completed: 2017
- Owner: Lodha Group

Height
- Height: 195 m (640 ft)

Technical details
- Material: Glass / Reinforced Concrete
- Floor count: 43
- Lifts/elevators: 6

Design and construction
- Architect: Hadi Tehrani
- Developer: Lodha Group
- Structural engineer: MKA Chicago, Sterling Consultants
- Other designers: Building Envelope Specialists (BES)

Website
- www.lodhagroup.com/projects/residential-property-in-mumbai/lodha-altamount

Lodha Altamount is a postmodern luxury residential skyscraper located in the billionaires row of Mumbai, India. Designed by Hadi Teherani, it has an all-glass black façade. The building has 43 floors and is 195 metres (640 feet) tall. It is the 68th tallest building in India.

== History ==
The three-story Washington House, home to US Consul General, was previously built on the site, covering an area of 2,702 square meters. It was in Coastal Regulation Zone 2 and was listed as a Grade 3 Property. In 2012, Lodha Group acquired the land from the US consulate for ₹341.8 crore, surpassing the bids made by Mahindra Lifespaces and TATA Housing.

In 2015, a 10,000-square-foot apartment at the building was sold for over ₹1.6 billion at ₹160,000 per square foot, which, according to The Times of India, is the highest price per square foot ever paid in India at that time. This also beat the record for the previous sale in the same building at ₹141,543 per square foot.

In September 2016, The Indian Express reported that the Urban Development department of Government of Maharashtra has granted more rights for Lodha Group to build the building's 38th floor, after a dispute between the developer and Brihanmumbai Municipal Corporation (BMC) on floor space index (FSI) incentive in the Public Parking Lot scheme, (Note: The scheme stated that the developer could get 50 per cent of the total built-up parking area for the FSI incentive, which then became the input for the total buildable area, which is 1.33 FSI times the remaining net plot area, after a 15 per cent deduction of road and Recreation Ground (RG) area, with the total buildable area capped at four times the net plot area. Lodha Group argued that they have the rights to use the full incentive without RG area deduction, while BMC stated that the incentive applies only on net plot area after the deduction, not on gross plot area, except for the use in affordable housing construction.) which the developer chose in 2012.

== Location ==
The development is built on the former location of Washington House, a property of US Consulate General for which the acquisition was announced in 2012 for a sum of ₹341.82 crore. The development is located at SK Barodawalla Marg, popularly known by its former name, Altamount Road. It's right in front of Mukesh Ambani's Antilia (building).

== Architecture ==
Lodha Altamount has 43 floors, including 8 floors of podium, and 52 residential units. The apartment's amenities are located on the 8th floor, which comprises a gymnasium, spa, outdoor infinity pool, movie lounge, and a boardroom. The entrance lobby of Lodha Altamount features La Plage, Juan-les-Pins, an artwork by Spanish painter Pablo Picasso.

=== Design ===
The building was designed by Hamburg-based architect Hadi Teherani. It has a black, all-glass façade, which, according to Lodha Group, was designed to provide privacy for the residents without obstructing the outside view and to maintain moderate climate conditions within.

== See also ==
- List of tallest buildings in Mumbai
- List of tallest buildings in India
- List of tallest buildings in different cities in India
- List of tallest buildings and structures in the Indian subcontinent
