= Lodha Bellissimo =

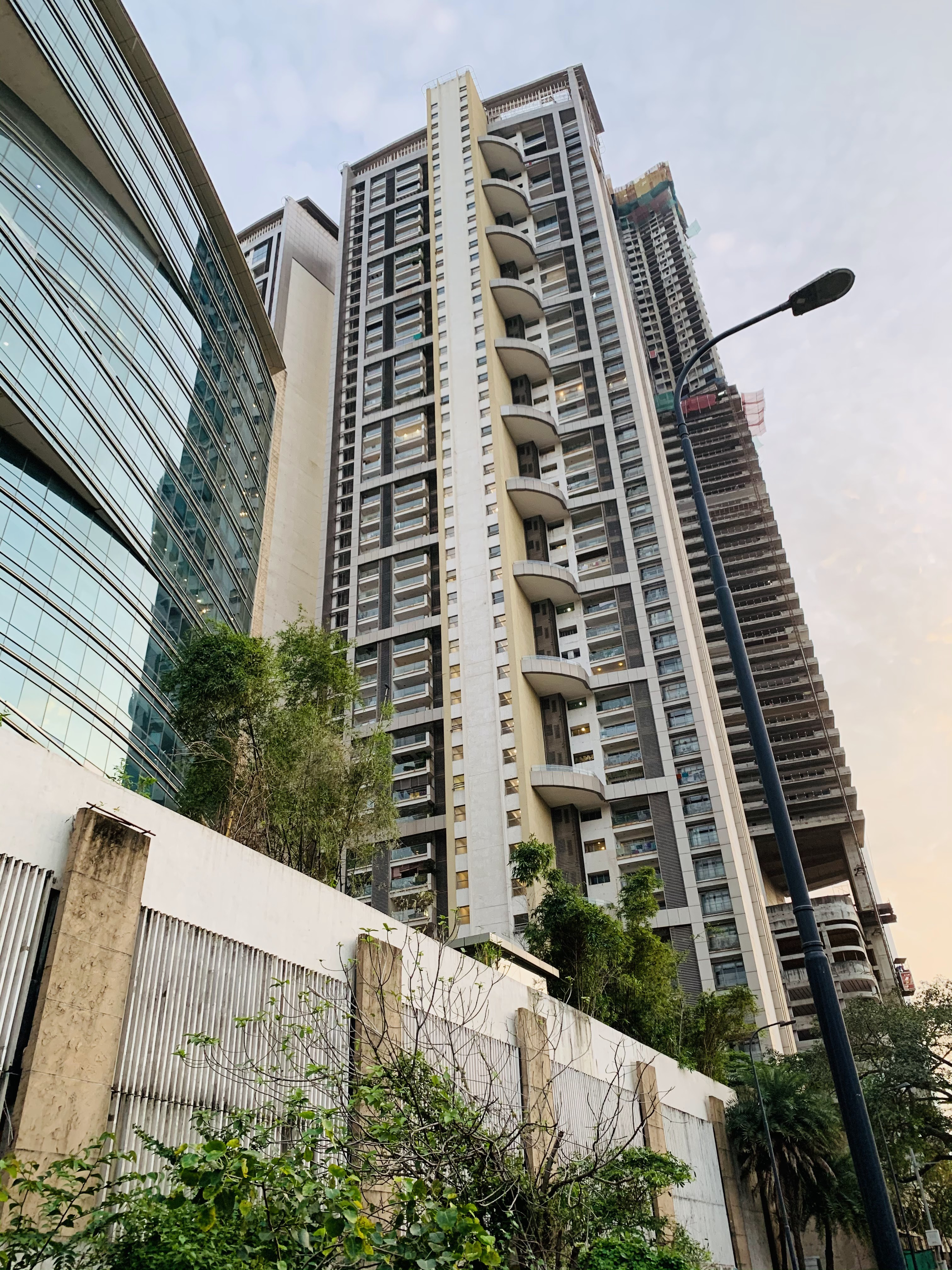
- Block C Tower
- Interactive map of the Lodha Bellissimo area

General information
- Status: Completed
- Type: Residential Apartments
- Location: Mumbai, India
- Coordinates: 18.9873173°N 72.8286213°E
- Construction started: 2006
- Completed: 2012
- Opening: 2014
- Owner: Lodha Group
- Operator: Lodha Group

Height
- Roof: 222 m (728 ft)

Technical details
- Floor count: 53

Design and construction
- Architect: Kapadia Associates
- Developer: Lodha Group

Website
- www.lodhagroup.com/projects/residential-property-in-mumbai/lodha-bellissimo

Lodha Bellissimo is a twin residential skyscraper project located in Mumbai, India developed by Lodha Group. Construction started in 2006 by dividing the project into three wings and was completed in 2012. This 222 metres (728 ft) tall, 53-floor building is the 35th tallest in India.

== Construction Timeline ==
Construction of Lodha Bellissimo began in 2006, with foundation work and podiums rising by early 2007. The project was executed in three wings: Wings A and B topped out in November 2010, and Wing C was completed in March 2012, marking full structural completion that year Construction. Final fit‑out and commissioning carried into late 2012, and the first occupants moved in shortly thereafter.

== Structure ==
The Lodha Bellissimo consists of three adjacent 48-storey towers (plus one basement, two podium levels, ground and service floors, and a rooftop terrace), rising to a height of 198 m. The superstructure is a conventional RCC framed system, while the distinctive sea-wave inspired roof crown is fabricated from hot‑dip galvanized structural steel clad in aluminum composite panels. Each wing is served by four high‑speed Mitsubishi elevators (operating at 4 m/s). The floor plate is supported on a single-cell steel-concrete composite box girder, with seismic and wind loads resisted by the RCC core walls and perimeter frames. Continuous balconies and sky gardens at every fourth level provide open communal spaces, and all services (electrical, HVAC, plumbing) are routed through concealed shafts to preserve the clean architectural lines.

== See also ==
- List of tallest structures in the Indian subcontinent
- List of tallest buildings in Mumbai
- List of tallest buildings in India
- Lodha Altamount
- Lodha Group
