= Kalpana Shah =

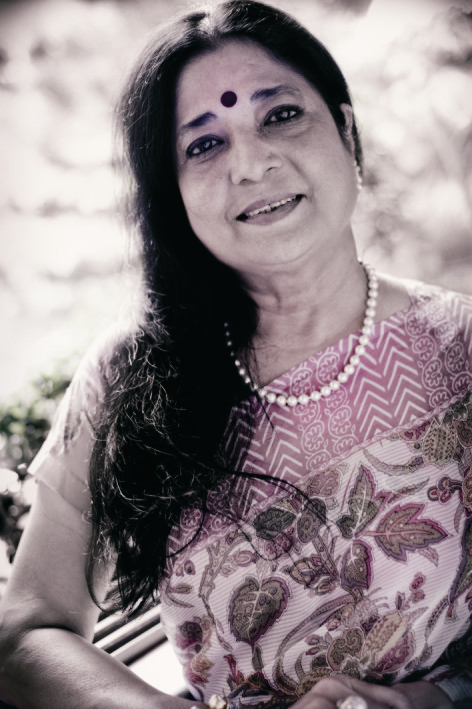
- Indian Sari Stylist
- Born: 30 November 1948 (age 77); Surat, Gujarat
- Occupation: Author
- Children: Nirbhay and Brinda
- Writing career
- Pen name: Kalpana
- Years active: 1985–present
- Genre: non-fiction
- Subjects: Indian culture, everyday life, style
- Website: kalpanashah.in

Kalpana Shah (born 30 November 1948) is an Indian sari draper, stylist, author, and entrepreneur. She resides at Altamount Road, Mumbai, India. She has practiced the art of sari draping since 1985. She gives sari draping lessons and workshops and drapes saris for formal events.

== Personal life ==
Kalpana Shah was born in a Gujarati Jain family of jewelers. She spent her early childhood in Surat, Gujarat. At the age of 10, she and her family moved to Mumbai, Maharashtra where she finished her schooling and few years of college.

== Career ==
Kalpana trained as a Bharat Natyam dancer, performing live shows in many parts of India. She married at 23. Kalpana then took courses in beauty and grooming. Kalpana noted that many women were not comfortable in draping their saris and began to focus her career on the fashion industry. She has assisted Bollywood productions, fashion shows, and private events for sari draping.

Kalpana Shah has draped saris for Bollywood Celebrities such as Deepika Padukone, Aishwarya Rai, Sonam Kapoor, Kareena Kapoor, Katrina Kaif, Nargis Fakhri, Huma Qureshi and Jacqueline Fernandez.

She has draped for weddings and formal functions for various business houses including the Birlas, Hindujas, Dhoots, Ruias, Ambanis, Goels, Wadias, and the Mittals of Delhi and London.

Her book "The Whole 9 Yards" was published in 2012, and followed by an app "Learn Sari" in 2014.
