= LMSI =

LMSI may refer to:

- Laser Magnetic Storage International, a defunct Philips subsidiary known for its proprietary CD-ROM interface
- Latin Mass Society of Ireland
- Lockheed Martin Systems Integration – Owego
- Lodha Mathematical Sciences Institute, in Mumbai
- Lower Manhattan Security Initiative, a New York City Police Department initiative
