= South Mumbai =

Precinct of Mumbai in Maharashtra, India

South Mumbai South Bombay Old Mumbai / Old Bombay / Mumbai Town / Townside
- Precinct of Mumbai
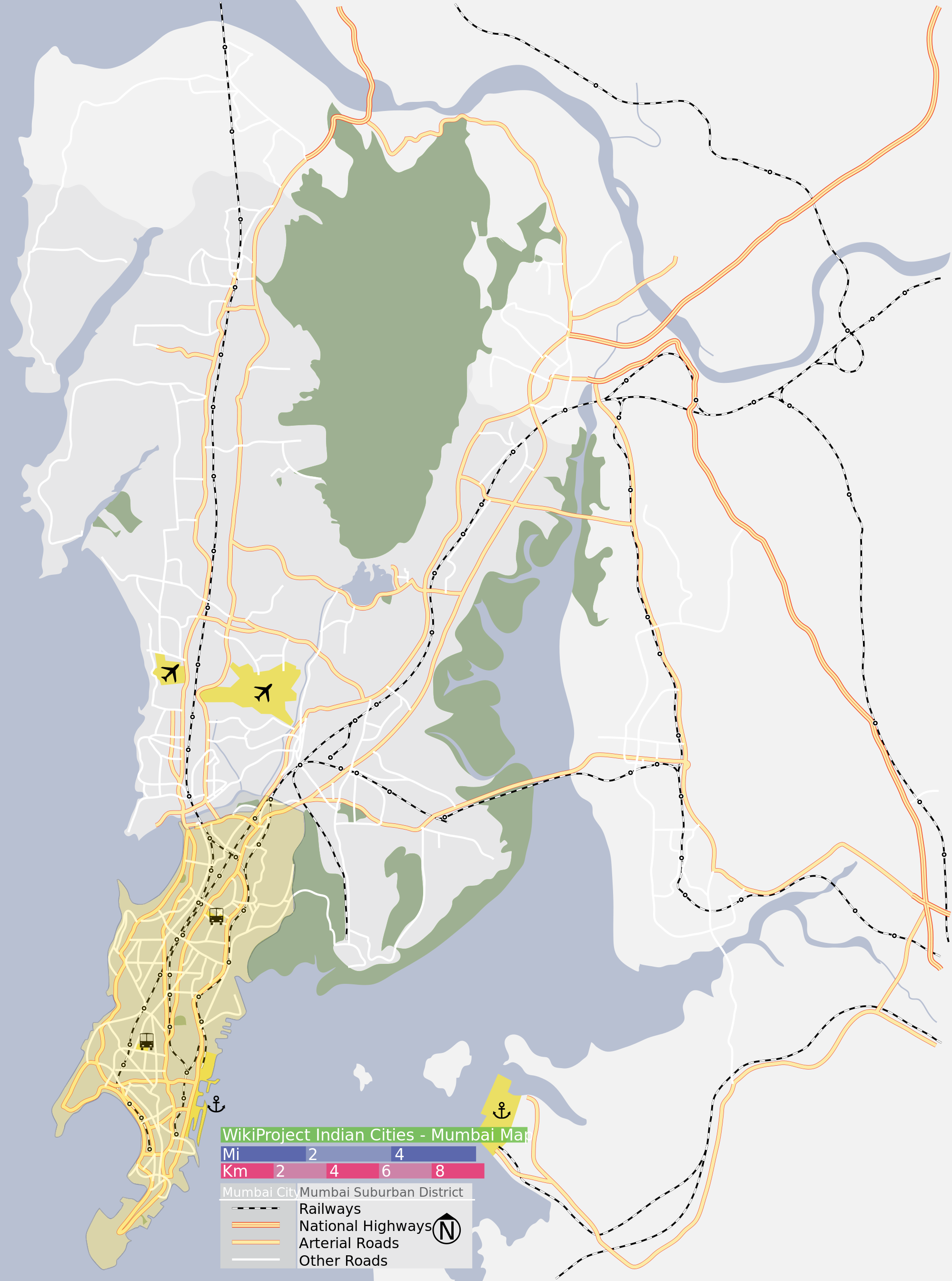
- Island City District highlighted in yellow

- South Mumbai South Mumbai (Maharashtra) South Mumbai (India)
- Coordinates (Malabar Hill): 18.95°N 72.795°E
- Country: India
- State: Maharashtra
- District: Mumbai City
- City: Mumbai
- Wards: A, B, C, D, E

Government
  - Body: BMC

Area
  - Total: 67.7 km^{2} (26.1 sq mi)

Population (2011)
  - Total: 3,145,966
  - Density: 46,500/km^{2} (120,000/sq mi)
- Demonym(s): Mumbaikar, Soboite
- Time zone: UTC+5:30 (IST)

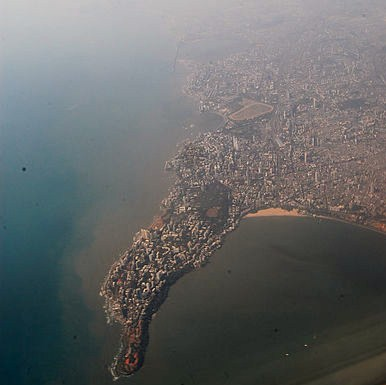
Aerial view of Malabar Hill to the left and Girgaon Chowpatty to a little right.

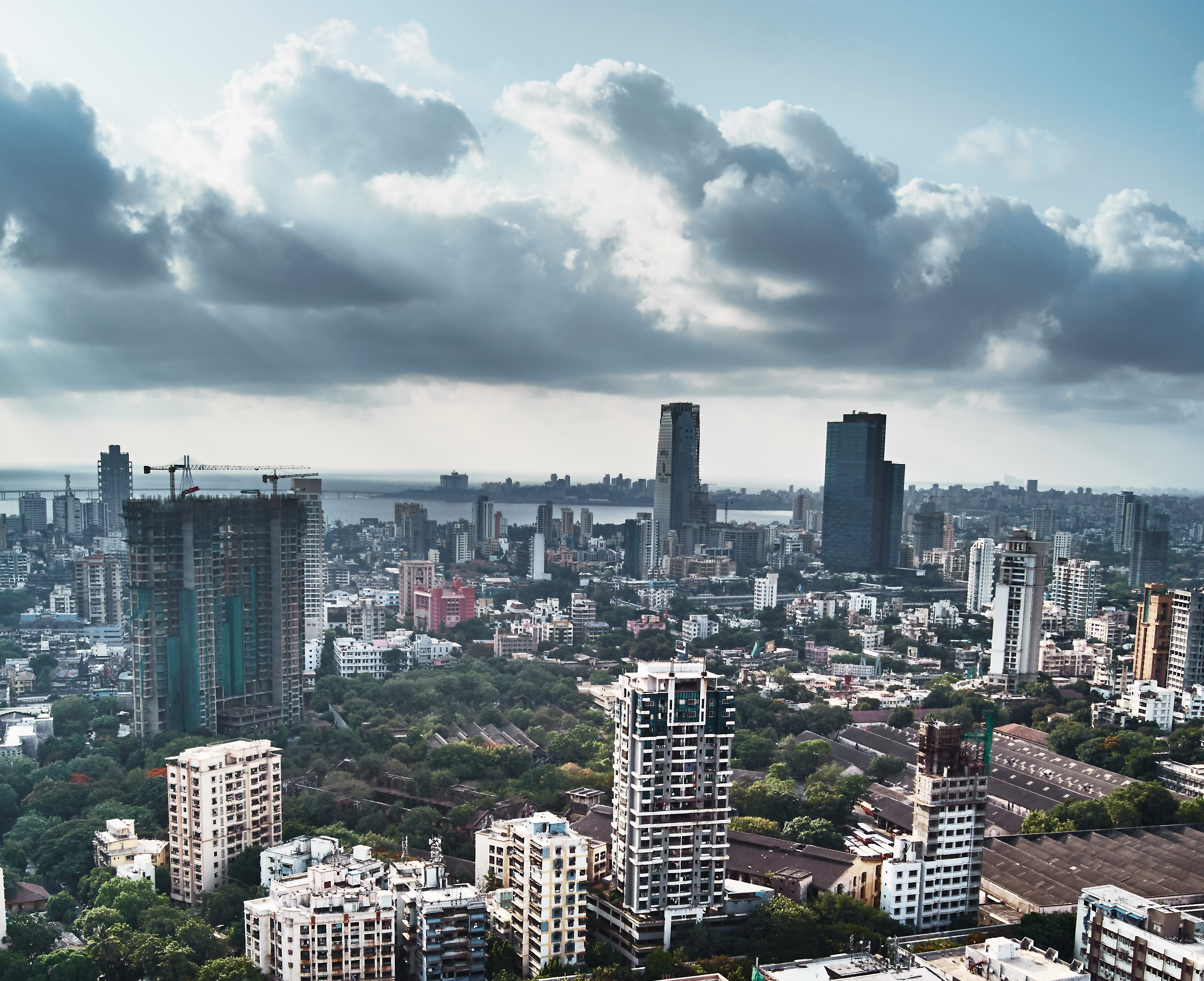
Settlements of South Mumbai

South Mumbai, colloquially SoBo from South Bombay in Indian English, administratively the Mumbai City District, is the city centre and the southernmost precinct of Greater Bombay. It extends from Colaba to Mahalaxmi (Western side), Byculla (Central Side) and Mazgaon (Harbour Side) neighbourhoods, and comprises the city's old and formerly main business localities, making it the wealthiest urban precinct in India. Property prices in South Mumbai are by far the highest in India and among the highest in the world. In terms of Maharashtra Legislative Assembly, the precinct consists of the constituencies of Colaba, Mumbadevi, Malabar Hill and Byculla.

The Taj Mahal Palace & Tower, Gateway of India, Chhatrapati Shivaji Maharaj Terminus, Ballard Estate, and the Bombay Harbour are some of the most iconic landmarks of South Bombay. Billionaire Mukesh Ambani's $1.5 billion home Antilia is located here and is now a part of the iconic skyline. Most residents of South Mumbai belong to old money business, law, trade, and fashion families. Geographically, South Mumbai lies at the southernmost extent of Mumbai Island. Most city residents use the term to refer to the stretch extending from Colaba to Tardeo and Byculla as South Mumbai. The area is delimited on the east by Mumbai harbour and on the west by the Arabian Sea.

South Mumbai is also home to many educational institutions; namely Mumbai University's Fort Campus, Tata Institute of Fundamental Research, Cathedral and John Connon School, St. Anne's High School, Fort, JB Petit, Campion, Bombay International School, Gamdevi, St. Mary's School, Mumbai, etc.; exclusive sports clubs: CCI, Willingdon Sports Club, as well as the Bombay Gymkhana; and hospitals such as Breach Candy Hospital, Bombay Hospital, Jaslok Hospital, and Hurkisondas Hospital.

== Significance ==
South Mumbai hosts the Reserve Bank of India, the Bombay Stock Exchange and, one of the oldest YMCA buildings. Its primary business districts are the Fort, Nariman Point, Ballard Estate, and more recently Lower Parel, Mumbai Central. Many leading Indian and multi-national companies are headquartered here. Chhatrapati Shivaji Maharaj Terminus (CSMT) and Churchgate serve as headquarters and starting point for country's Central Railway and Western Railway lines respectively.

The headquarters of the Brihanmumbai Municipal Corporation, the governing civic body of Greater Mumbai is located in South Mumbai. The Bombay High Court is also in South Mumbai.

The terrorist attacks of 2008 included many prominent South Mumbai locations including the Taj Mahal Palace Hotel in Colaba, Leopold Cafe and Chhatrapati Shivaji Maharaj Terminus.

The area houses a proportion of upmarket residential neighbourhoods of Mumbai including: Pedder Road, Nepean Sea Road, Kemps Corner, Altamount Road, Carmichael Road, Breach Candy and Walkeshwar Road, forming a sort of golden quadrilateral and includes residential areas, such as the Hanging Gardens, Kemps Corner, Cuffe Parade and Malabar Hill.

South Mumbai is home to two UNESCO World Heritage Sites: Chhatrapati Shivaji Maharaj Terminus and the city's distinctive ensemble of Victorian and Art Deco buildings. South Mumbai boasts a large number of Art Deco buildings, second only to Miami. South Mumbai's architecture also comprises historical monuments from the colonial era which attract tourists throughout the year.

South Mumbai has many educational institutions such as Jamnalal Bajaj Institute of Management Studies, St. Xavier's College, Government Law College, Jai Hind College, Wilson College, Grant Medical College, Sydenham Institute of Management Studies, Research and Entrepreneurship Education, Aditya Birla World Academy among others.

Many distinctive sporting clubs have been an integral part of South Mumbai landscape like the Willingdon Sports Club, the Turf Club at Mahalaxmi Racecourse, the Bombay Gymkhana, the Breach Candy Club, the N.S.C.I., and the Malabar Hill Club (Formerly W.I.A.A. Club). The Cricket Club of India (CCI) and Mumbai Cricket Association (MCA) are located at Mumbai's two cricket stadiums, namely Brabourne Stadium and Wankhede Stadium respectively.

Although land reclamation has allowed the southernmost tip of the district to double in size since the 1970s, the business districts face an acute shortage of real estate. As a result, the real-estate prices are among the top ten worldwide. As a ratio to average per capita income, real-estate prices in the business districts remain the most expensive in the world.

South Mumbai is also home to such sporting grounds as Brabourne Stadium, Wankhede Stadium, Shivaji Park, Azad Maidan, Oval Maidan, and Cooperage Ground.

Mumbai's most popular beach, Girgaon Chowpatty is located at the beginning of a 3.6 km esplanade known as the Marine Drive which is a popular hangout spot among the citizens. Another popular esplanade in South Mumbai is the Worli Seaface.

South Mumbai has popular art galleries and museums like Chhatrapati Shivaji Maharaj Vastu Sangrahalaya, Jehangir Art Gallery, Nehru Centre Art Gallery. Sobo Films, an independent film producer, has been named after the area but is itself based in Andheri in the west.

South Mumbai has become less congested with the creation of the Bandra Worli Sea Link. Auto rickshaws are strictly banned here. This facilitates quicker transport between people residing in the suburbs and the corporate offices in South Mumbai. Traffic is a major concern in most parts.

== Division ==
The city of Mumbai lies on two different islands, the Mumbai Island and Salsette Island. Administratively, it has two official divisions: Mumbai City district and Mumbai Suburban district. Mumbai City district is on Mumbai Island - the area on its southernmost tip is called South Mumbai. Mumbai Suburban district consists of the Western, Eastern, Central, and Northern parts of the city. The northernmost portion of the island - outside Mumbai city limits - lies in Thane district.

== Old Bombay ==
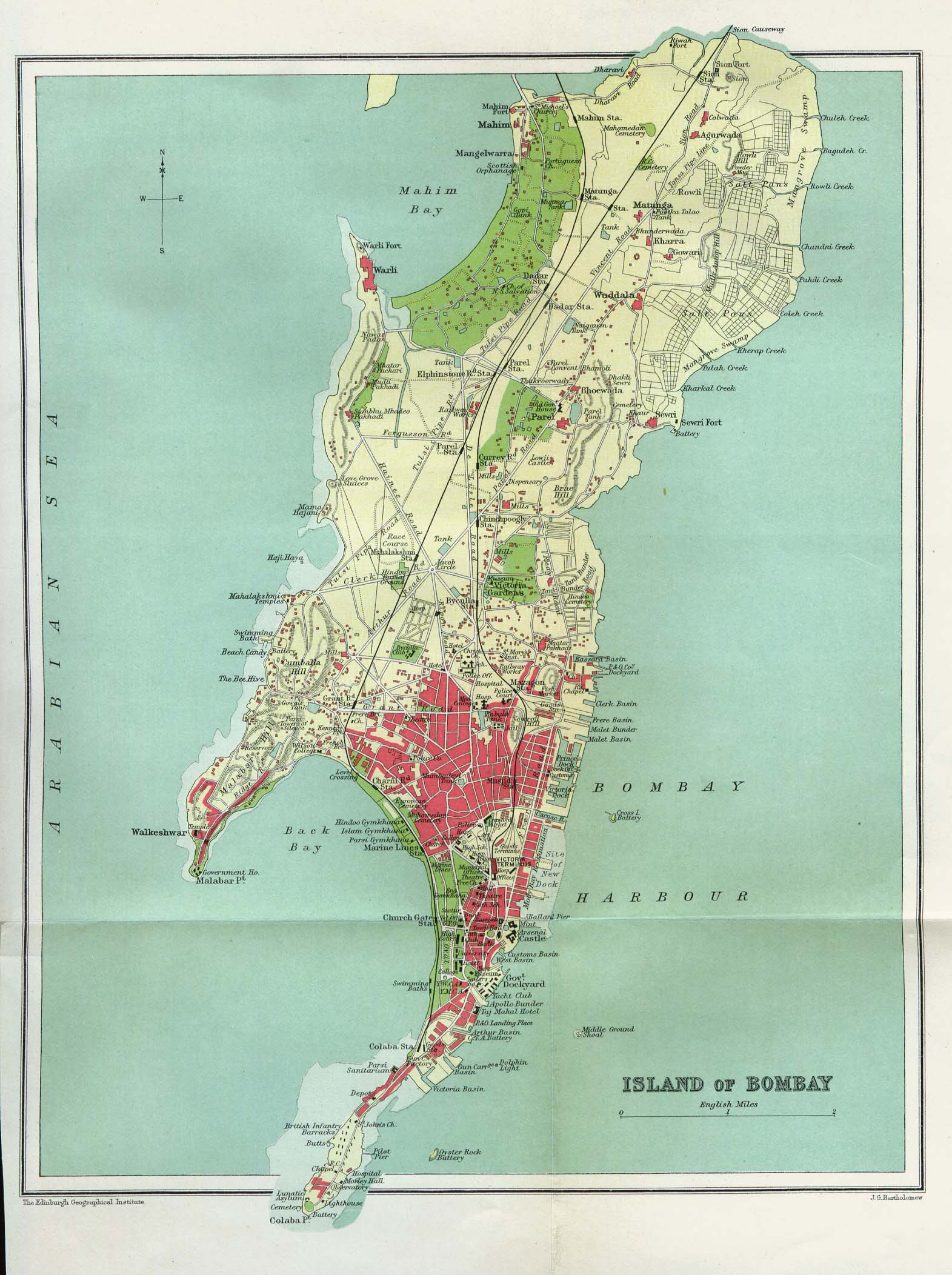
Bombay in 1909

Old Bombay was used to refer to the area which was formed by the merging of the seven original islands of Mumbai, India. The term was used from the 19th century until the 1980s and is now considered archaic, however still widely used.

== See also ==
- Salsette Island
- Western Suburbs
- Eastern Suburbs
- Pali Hill
- Soho, London
- SoHo, Manhattan
- Central Mumbai

== Notes ==
- "Population and Employment profile of Mumbai Metropolitan Region" (PDF). Mumbai Metropolitan Region Development Authority (MMRDA). Archived from the original (PDF) on 13 June 2010.
