= Malabar Hill Assembly constituency =

Constituency of the Maharashtra legislative assembly in India

Coordinates: 18.9518967°N 72.7818347°E

Malabar Hill
- Constituency No. 185 for the Maharashtra Legislative Assembly

Constituency details
- Country: India
- Region: Western India
- State: Maharashtra
- District: Mumbai City
- Lok Sabha constituency: Mumbai South
- Established: 1978
- Total electors: 261,172
- Reservation: None

Member of Legislative Assembly
- 15th Maharashtra Legislative Assembly
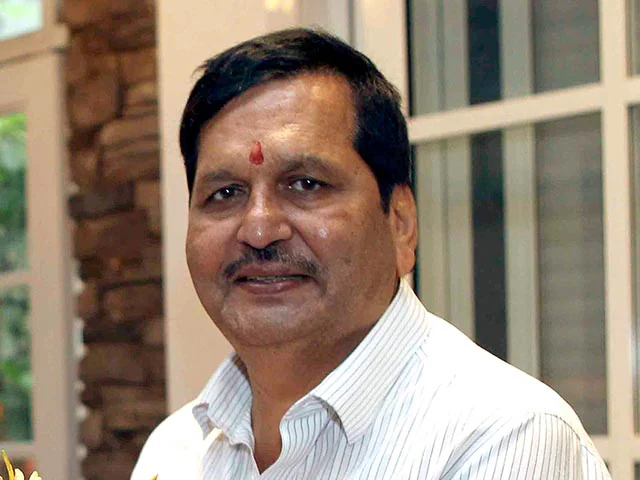
- Incumbent Mangal Prabhat Lodha
- Party: Bharatiya Janata Party
- Elected year: 2024

Malabar Hill Assembly constituency is one of the 288 Vidhan Sabha (Assembly) constituencies of Maharashtra state in Western India.

== Demographics ==
Malabar Hill (constituency number 185) is one of the 10 constituencies of Vidhan Sabha located in the Mumbai City district. The number of electors in 2009 was 270,977 (male 153,952, female 117,025) there are 39,137 voters from minority community.

It is a part of the Mumbai City South (Lok Sabha constituency) along with five other assembly constituencies, viz Worli, Byculla, Shivadi, Mumbadevi and Colaba.

== Members of the Legislative Assembly ==
Year	Member	Party
1951-78: Constituency did not exist
1978	Balwant Desai	Janata Party
1980	Balwant Desai	Indian National Congress (I)
1985	Balwant Desai	Indian National Congress
1990	Balwant Desai	Indian National Congress
1995	Mangal Prabhat Lodha	Bharatiya Janata Party
1999	Mangal Prabhat Lodha	Bharatiya Janata Party
2004	Mangal Prabhat Lodha	Bharatiya Janata Party
2009	Mangal Prabhat Lodha	Bharatiya Janata Party
2014	Mangal Prabhat Lodha	Bharatiya Janata Party
2019	Mangal Prabhat Lodha	Bharatiya Janata Party
2024	Mangal Prabhat Lodha	Bharatiya Janata Party

== Election results ==
Vote share of winning candidates
2024	74.47%
2019	79.34%
2014	67.64%
2009	47.73%
2004	50.27%
1999	52.63%
1995	48.28%
1990	38.10%
1985	66.16%
1980	43.27%
1978	48.85%

=== Assembly Election 2024 ===
2024 Maharashtra Legislative Assembly election : Malabar Hill
Party	Candidate	Votes	%	±%
BJP	Mangal Prabhat Lodha	101,197	74.47%	▼4.87
SS(UBT)	Bherulal Dayalal Choudhary	33,178	24.41%	New
NOTA	None of the Above	2,015	1.48%	▼3.09
Margin of victory		68,019	50.05%	▼10.91
Turnout		137,911	52.80%	▲7.10
Total valid votes		135,896		
Registered electors		261,172		▼0.47
BJP hold		Swing	▼4.87	

=== Assembly Election 2019 ===
2019 Maharashtra Legislative Assembly election : Malabar Hill
Party	Candidate	Votes	%	±%
BJP	Mangal Prabhat Lodha	93,538	79.34%	▲11.69
INC	Heera Navaji Devasi	21,666	18.38%	▲10.82
NOTA	None of the Above	5,392	4.57%	▲3.69
Margin of victory		71,872	60.96%	▲13.46
Turnout		123,289	46.99%	▼7.16
Total valid votes		117,897		
Registered electors		262,400		▼5.47
BJP hold		Swing	▲11.69	

=== Assembly Election 2014 ===
2014 Maharashtra Legislative Assembly election : Malabar Hill
Party	Candidate	Votes	%	±%
BJP	Mangal Prabhat Lodha	97,818	67.64%	▲19.92
SS	Arvind (Arun) Devji Dudhwadkar	29,132	20.15%	New
INC	Susieben Shah	10,928	7.56%	▼20.14
MNS	Adv.Rajendra Adhik Shirodkar	3,925	2.71%	▼18.45
NOTA	None of the Above	1,279	0.88%	New
NCP	Narendra Rane	1,111	0.77%	New
Margin of victory		68,686	47.50%	▲27.47
Turnout		145,912	52.56%	▲6.84
Total valid votes		144,607		
Registered electors		277,586		▲2.43
BJP hold		Swing	▲19.92	

=== Assembly Election 2009 ===
2009 Maharashtra Legislative Assembly election : Malabar Hill
Party	Candidate	Votes	%	±%
BJP	Mangal Prabhat Lodha	58,530	47.73%	▼2.54
INC	Bafna Rajkumar Sumermal	33,971	27.70%	▼18.54
MNS	Adv. Archit Mohan Jaykar	25,949	21.16%	New
Margin of victory		24,559	20.03%	▲16.00
Turnout		122,642	45.26%	▼5.30
Total valid votes		122,636		
Registered electors		270,998		▲66.48
BJP hold		Swing	▼2.54	

=== Assembly Election 2004 ===
2004 Maharashtra Legislative Assembly election : Malabar Hill
Party	Candidate	Votes	%	±%
BJP	Mangal Prabhat Lodha	41,365	50.27%	▼2.37
INC	Raj Shroff	38,052	46.24%	▲9.27
BSP	Pralhad Ramchandra Jadhav	1,379	1.68%	New
Margin of victory		3,313	4.03%	▼11.64
Turnout		82,293	50.56%	▲2.30
Total valid votes		82,293		
Registered electors		162,778		▼0.61
BJP hold		Swing	▼2.37	

=== Assembly Election 1999 ===
1999 Maharashtra Legislative Assembly election : Malabar Hill
Party	Candidate	Votes	%	±%
BJP	Mangal Prabhat Lodha	41,596	52.63%	▲4.35
INC	Balvantray Ambelal Desai	29,214	36.96%	▼9.20
NCP	Mayekar Subhash Vithal	6,502	8.23%	New
Independent	Sanjay Ramchandra Shirke	642	0.81%	New
Margin of victory		12,382	15.67%	▲13.55
Turnout		79,055	48.27%	▼8.46
Total valid votes		79,032		
Registered electors		163,779		▲2.54
BJP hold		Swing	▲4.35	

=== Assembly Election 1995 ===
1995 Maharashtra Legislative Assembly election : Malabar Hill
Party	Candidate	Votes	%	±%
BJP	Mangal Prabhat Lodha	43,735	48.28%	▲22.71
INC	Balvantray Ambelal Desai	41,817	46.16%	▲8.06
JD	Daftary J. G.	1,860	2.05%	▼21.35
Independent	Mane V. S.	774	0.85%	New
Independent	Khan Mohammed Yakub	577	0.64%	New
Margin of victory		1,918	2.12%	▼10.42
Turnout		91,979	57.59%	▲8.57
Total valid votes		90,590		
Registered electors		159,727		▼0.59
BJP gain from INC		Swing	▲10.17	

=== Assembly Election 1990 ===
1990 Maharashtra Legislative Assembly election : Malabar Hill
Party	Candidate	Votes	%	±%
INC	Balvantray Ambelal Desai	29,474	38.10%	▼28.06
BJP	Amar Jariwala	19,778	25.57%	New
JD	Khan Faruk Ardeshar	18,106	23.41%	New
Independent	Gunvant Sheth	8,914	11.52%	New
INS(SCS)	Parinar Vinod	588	0.76%	New
Margin of victory		9,696	12.53%	▼22.35
Turnout		78,094	48.61%	▲12.73
Total valid votes		77,353		
Registered electors		160,667		▲12.12
INC hold		Swing	▼28.06	

=== Assembly Election 1985 ===
1985 Maharashtra Legislative Assembly election : Malabar Hill
Party	Candidate	Votes	%	±%
INC	Balvantray Ambelal Desai	33,574	66.16%	New
IC(S)	Bane Manohar V.	15,872	31.28%	New
LKD	Radheyshyam Hublal Yadav	482	0.95%	New
Independent	Dawale Motiram Guruji	377	0.74%	New
Margin of victory		17,702	34.88%	▲32.90
Turnout		51,300	35.80%	▲3.29
Total valid votes		50,748		
Registered electors		143,299		▲2.33
INC gain from INC(I)		Swing	▲22.89	

=== Assembly Election 1980 ===
1980 Maharashtra Legislative Assembly election : Malabar Hill
Party	Candidate	Votes	%	±%
INC(I)	Balvantray Ambelal Desai	19,464	43.27%	▲31.94
BJP	Parikha Narendra Natwarlal	18,574	41.29%	New
JP	Rajda Hansaben Ratansinh	5,847	13.00%	▼35.86
Independent	Vishwanath (Babi) Mahadeo Sawant	851	1.89%	New
Margin of victory		890	1.98%	▼22.41
Turnout		45,400	32.42%	▼22.46
Total valid votes		44,985		
Registered electors		140,035		▲0.89
INC(I) gain from JP		Swing	▼5.59	

=== Assembly Election 1978 ===
1978 Maharashtra Legislative Assembly election : Malabar Hill
Party	Candidate	Votes	%	±%
JP	Balvantray Ambelal Desai	37,016	48.85%	New
INC	Murli Deora	18,540	24.47%	New
INC(I)	R. D. Sawant	8,580	11.32%	New
Independent	Tawde Narayan Sakharam	4,723	6.23%	New
CPI	Madhu Shetye	3,556	4.69%	New
Independent	Nana Chudasama	3,353	4.43%	New
Margin of victory		18,476	24.38%	
Turnout		76,906	55.41%	
Total valid votes		75,768		
Registered electors		138,797		
JP win (new seat)				
