= Antilia (building) =

Skyscraper mansion in Mumbai, India

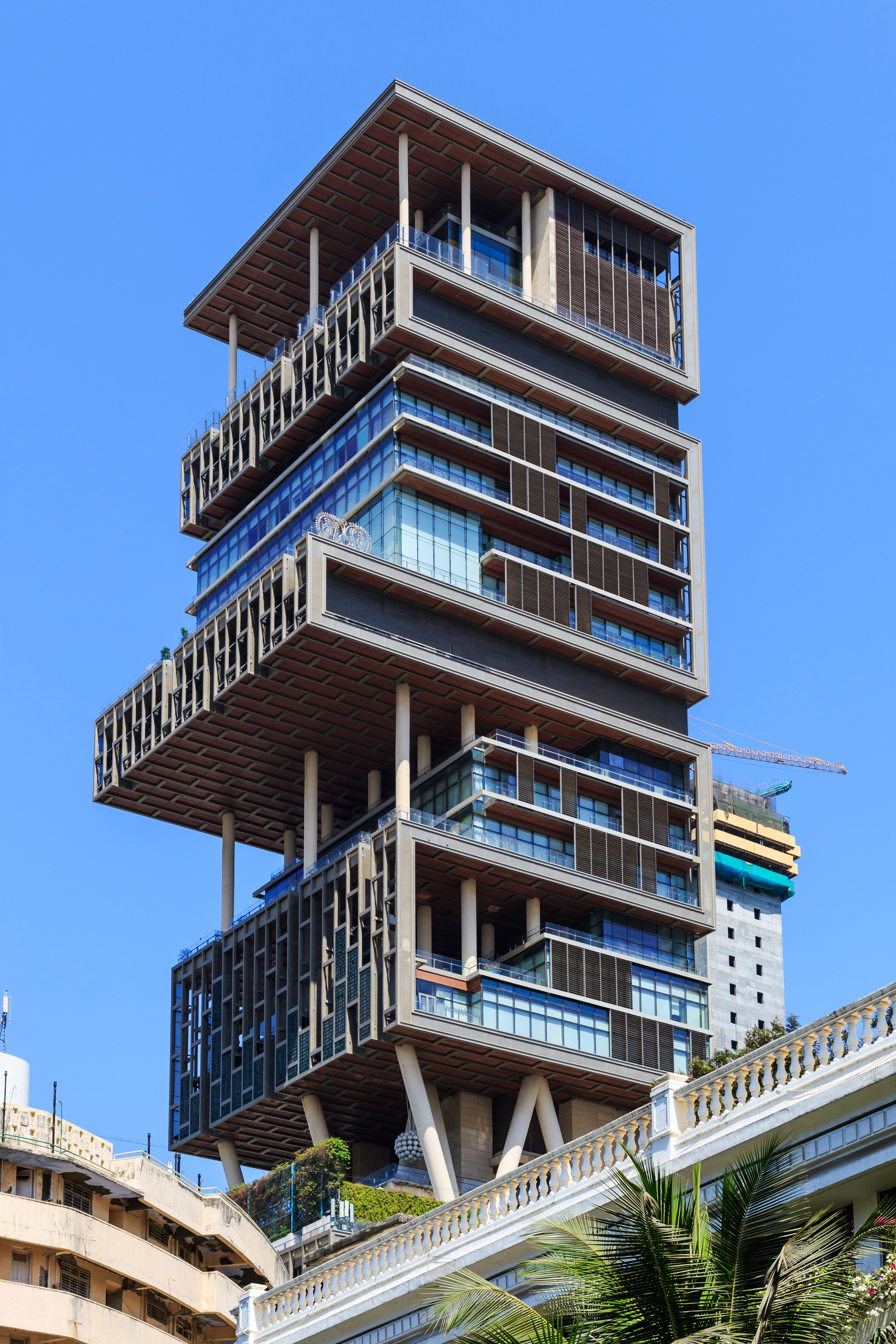

General information
- Status: Completed in 2010
- Location: Altamount Road, Cumballa Hill, Mumbai, India
- Coordinates: 18.9681°N 72.8095°E
- Completed: 2010
- Opening: November 2010
- Cost: almost US$2 billion
- Owner: Mukesh Ambani

Height
- Height: 173 m (568 ft)

Technical details
- Floor count: 27
- Lifts/elevators: 10

Design and construction
- Architect: Perkins & Will
- Structural engineer: Sterling Engineering Consultancy Services (Mumbai)
- Main contractor: Leighton Asia

Antilia is the residence of the Indian billionaire businessman Mukesh Ambani and his family. It is located on Billionaires' Row in Mumbai. Built from 2006 to 2010 at a cost of nearly US$2 billion, it was valued at US$4.6 billion in 2023. It is the most expensive residence in India and one of the most expensive and largest private homes in the world.

It is designed to withstand a magnitude-eight earthquake. The top six floors are private residential areas. The structure's design incorporates the lotus plant and the sun.

The structure is 27 storeys and 173 metres (568 ft) tall, over 37,000 square metres (400,000 sq ft) in area, and equipped with amenities including a 168-car garage, ballroom, 9 high-speed lifts, a 50-seat theatre, terrace gardens, swimming pool, spa, health centre, temple, and a "snow room", which produces snowflakes from its walls.

== Site ==
The 4,532-square-metre (1.120-acre) land on which Antilia was built, previously housed an orphanage called Currimbhoy Ebrahim Khoja Yateemkhana (Kareembhai Ibrahim Khwaja Orphanage) belonging to a charity run by the Waqf Board. The orphanage had been founded in 1895 by Currimbhoy Ebrahim, a wealthy shipowner. In 2002 the trust requested permission to sell this land. The charity commissioner gave the required permission three months later. The charity sold the land allocated for education of underprivileged Khoja children to Antilia Commercial Private Limited, a commercial entity controlled by Mukesh Ambani, in July 2002 for ₹210.5 million (US$2.2 million). The prevailing market value of the land at the time was at least ₹1.5 billion (US$16 million).

The sale was in direct contravention of §51 of the Wakf Act, which requires that any such sale of land should be done after obtaining the permission of the Maharashtra State Board of Waqfs. The Waqf minister Nawab Malik opposed this land sale, as did the revenue department of the Government of Maharashtra. Thus, a stay order was issued on the sale of the land. The Waqf board also initially opposed the deal and filed a public interest litigation (PIL) in the Supreme Court challenging the trust's decision. The Supreme Court, while dismissing the petition, asked the Waqf board to approach the Bombay High Court. However, the stay on the deal was subsequently vacated after the Waqf board withdrew its objection.

In June 2011, the Union government asked the Maharashtra government to consider referring the matter to the Central Bureau of Investigation (CBI). A PIL was filed a decade later by Abdul Matin against the orphanage's and the Charity commissioners' permission. As of 2018, the case was being heard by a special bench of the court.

== Design and construction ==
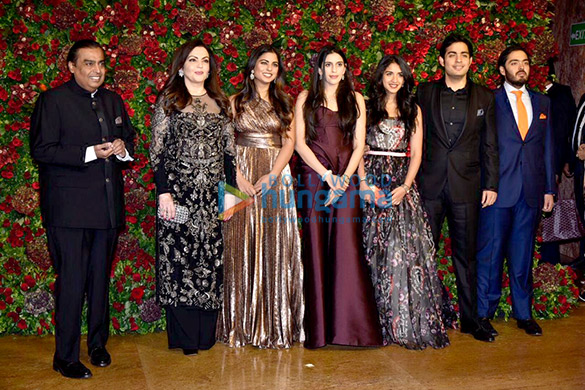
Antilia is the residence of Asia's richest family, the Ambani family.

The building was named after the mythical Spanish phantom island of Antillia. It was constructed between 2008 and 2010.

The building was designed by the American architecture firms Perkins & Will, based in Chicago, and Hirsch Bedner Associates, based in Los Angeles. They were consulted because Nita Ambani had been impressed by the contemporary Asian interiors at the Mandarin Oriental, New York, which they also designed.

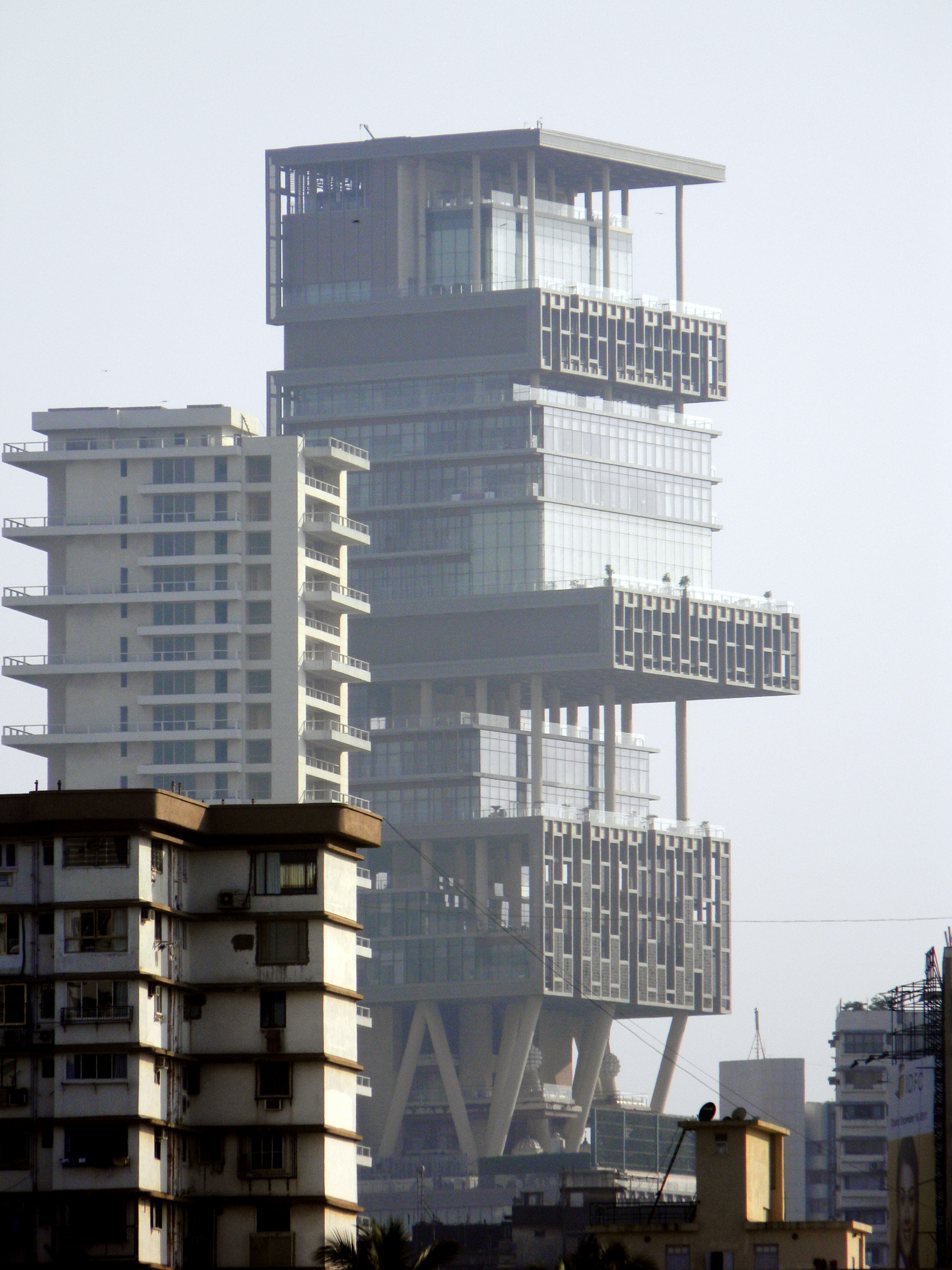
Antilia as seen from Haji Ali

The building plan was approved by the Brihanmumbai Municipal Corporation in 2003, and construction started in 2006 with Leighton Asia initially taking charge and completed by B. E. Billimoria & Company Ltd. The architects altered floor plans and design concepts as the construction of the building progressed. The home has 27 floors with extra-high ceilings. (Other buildings of equivalent height may have as many as 60 floors.) The home was also designed to survive an earthquake of magnitude 8. It is considered by some to be the tallest single-family house in the world, but others disqualify Antilia because it includes space for a staff of 600.

The interior design uses the shapes of the lotus and the sun. These two features are repeated throughout the building using crystals, marble, and mother-of-pearl. However, no two floors use the same materials or plan, the idea of the design is of consistency, but not repetition.

The building has three helipads; however, they are not operational. The helipads have to be certified airworthy in India by the Director-General of Civil Aviation (DGCA), and have yet to receive approval from the central defence and environment ministries.

The housewarming was held in November 2010. Still, the Ambanis did not immediately move in for fear of "bad luck". In June 2011, almost 50 renowned pandits were invited to conduct pujas and address vastu issues in the building, after which the Ambanis took up residence in September 2011.

== Cost and valuation ==
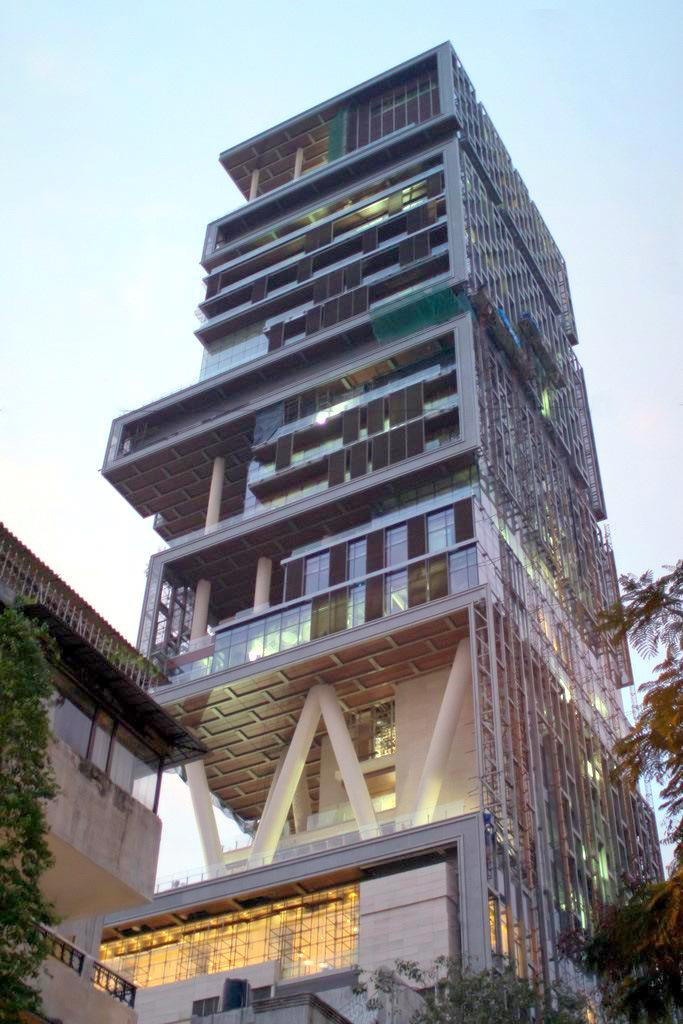
Antilia as seen from Altamount Road

Before construction, the value of the plot and the unbuilt house was estimated at more than US$1.2 billion. During planning, the house was expected to be the world's largest and most expensive home, with a cost of about US$2 billion.

In 2014, it was considered the world's most expensive private residence, costing between US$1 and US$2 billion to build.

As of 2023, it was valued at $4.6 billion, with the average annual growth rate of home prices in Mumbai from 2010 to 2020 at 11.2 percent. Prices in Mumbai increased by 100 percent in 2006 and 19 percent in 2012.

== Incidents ==
On 10 July 2017, a fire broke out on the ninth floor, and it was extinguished within a few minutes. Six firefighters reached the building within 10 minutes of getting the call. However, the fire was extinguished by Antilia staff before the fire brigade team arrived, using a small line of fixed firefighting systems and fire extinguishers. The fire was confined to the 4G antenna and plastic framing of the vertical garden.

On 25 February 2021, a car containing 20 explosive gelatin sticks and a threatening letter targeting the Ambanis was found near Antilia. The car was parked about 400 metres from the building on Carmichael Road bordering Altamount Road. A security officer at Antilia called the police control room about the suspicious vehicle, and the police rushed to the scene, joined by the bomb detection and disposal squad. After the sniffer dogs detected explosives, the bomb squad removed the gelatin sticks, which were found not to be assembled and had no battery or detonator. The probe was led by Mumbai's crime intelligence unit head, Sachin Vaze. The case was handed to the National Investigative Agency, which discovered that Vaze was himself involved in this incident, and he was arrested.

== Public reception ==
Tata Group former chairman Ratan Tata said Antilia is an example of rich Indians' lack of empathy for the poor. Tata said, "The person who lives in there should be concerned about what he sees around him and asking how he can make a difference. If he cannot, then it's sad because this country needs people to allocate some of their enormous wealth to finding ways of mitigating the hardship that people have. It makes me wonder why someone would do that. That's what revolutions are made of." Although experts also points out the irony in this comment by Ratan, who himself was a billionaire and lived in a lavish home in South Mumbai.

== See also ==
- List of tallest buildings in Mumbai
