= Carmichael Road =

Residential street in Maharashtra, India

- Residential Street
- Location in Mumbai
- Coordinates: 18°58′20″N 72°48′41″E
- Country: India
- State: Maharashtra
- District: Mumbai City
- City: Mumbai

Government
  - Type: Municipal Corporation
  - Body: Brihanmumbai Municipal Corporation (MCGM)

Languages
  - Official: Marathi
- Time zone: UTC+5:30 (IST)
- PIN: 400026
- Area code: 022
- Vehicle registration: MH 01
- Civic agency: BMC

Kamal Mahal in 1940

Carmichael Road is an upmarket residential street of Mumbai, India. Situated on a ridge in South Mumbai, it is now officially called Mahadev Laxman Dahanukar Marg. It has many old style bungalows and apartment houses, such as the art deco Kamal Mahal of film director, Kamal Amrohi. The street and surrounding neighbourhood is and has been home to Mumbai's rich and famous such as the Modys, the Commissariats, the Dahanukars, the Somaiyas, the Lalbhais, the Walchands and the Morarjees.

== History ==
The street is likely named for David Fremantle Carmichael, former member of the Madras Legislative Council and British Indian Civil servant.

The hill slopes of the street started being developed in the 1920s, with the bungalow of Municipal Commissioner of Mumbai being amongst the earliest, and by 1930 numerous large homes had come up on the street, many built on Rs 100,000 to Rs 150,000 at the time. The road is a declared heritage precinct, and falls within the Coastal Regulation Zone-2 and had a height restriction of 75 to 80 m; that is buildings can be a maximum of 25 storeys. The road has only one high-rise building, the 25-storey Usha Kiran built in the mid-1960s. The Usha Kiran building was designed by Mumbai architect Dilawar Noorani of Karim Noorani and Co. Redevelopment on the road comes under heritage rules, except for a "cessed structure", which either has tenants or was constructed prior to 1940. Over the years, many of the old buildings have been sold to developers, replaced by new ones, and often old residents have protested high-rise construction. Also in the neighbouring roads like Altamount Road, skyscrapers are going up. However, real estate prices have remained high nevertheless, on an average, prices range from ₹40,000 (US$420) to ₹90,000 (US$930) per sq ft. In 2010, Villa Nirmala, a 60-year-old bungalow on the street, once owned by Khanderao Gaekwar, and later by the Wagles and Lalvanis families, sold for ₹3 billion (US$31 million), also in the same year, an apartment in the Kamal Mahal building fetched ₹330 million (US$3.4 million).

== Notable residents ==
The street has official residences of the Governor of Reserve Bank of India, Chairman of the Mumbai Port Trust and the Municipal Commissioner of Mumbai, besides consulates of Japan, China and Belgium.

Some of the notable residents have been Dr. Manmohan Singh, former Prime Minister of India, when he was the Governor of Reserve Bank of India, Ashok Kumar Jain, Chairman, Bennet & Colemann, The Times of India group, Andrew Geddis, industrialist, Kumar Mangalam Birla, Chairman Aditya Birla Group, Ratan Tata chairman Tata Group, J.R.D. Tata, chairman Tata Group, Mukesh Ambani, Reliance Group, with renowned Indian Ghazal singer Padmashri Pankaj Udhas.

== See also ==
- Altamount Road
