= Ebrahim baronets =

Baronetcy in the Baronetage of the United Kingdom

The Ebrahim baronetcy, of Pabaney Villa, of the City of Bombay, is a title in the Baronetage of the United Kingdom. It was created on 20 July 1910 for the Indian businessman and philanthropist Sir Currimbhoy Ebrahim.

Each baronet assumes on succession the name of the 1st Baronet.

== Ebrahim baronets, of Bombay (1910) ==
- Sir Currimbhoy Ebrahim, 1st Baronet (1840–1924)
- Sir (Mahomedbhoy) Currimbhoy Ebrahim, 2nd Baronet (1867–1928)
- Sir (Huseinlali) Currimbhoy Ebrahim, 3rd Baronet (1903–1952)
- Sir (Mahomed) Currimbhoy Ebrahim, 4th Baronet (born 1935)

The heir apparent is the present holder's son Zulfiqar Ali Currimbhoy Ebrahim (born 1960).

== Arms ==
- Blazon: Argent, in base on waves of the sea a Chinese junk sailing to the sinister, in chief also on waves two dhows sailing to the dexter all proper, a chief per pale gules and or, thereon a pale azure, between a rose of the first and a lotus-flower also proper, and charged with a mullet issuant from a crescent above five mullets in crescent also of the first.
- Crest: On a wreath of the colours, above an Indian lily on water, a mullet radiated or.
- Motto: "Deo ducente nil nocet" (When God guides, nothing harms).
- Badge: a mullet or, surmounted by a lotus-flower proper".

== Notes ==
Baronetage of the United Kingdom
Preceded by Tuck baronets	Ebrahim baronets of Bombay; 20 July 1910	Succeeded by Jameson baronets
