= Jio-bp =

Indian petroleum company

Jio-bp Ltd
- Type: Subsidiary
- Industry: Oil and Gas
- Founded: 2008; 18 years ago; Merged with BP in 2020; 6 years ago
- Headquarters: Navi Mumbai, Maharashtra, India
- Key people: Mukesh Ambani
- Products: Petroleum; Oil; Natural Gas
- Revenue: ▲₹63,840 crore (US$6.6 billion) (2026)
- Net income: ▲₹1,827 crore (US$190 million) (2026)
- Total assets: ▲₹9,371 crore (US$970 million) (2026)
- Parent: Reliance Industries (51%); BP (49%)
- Website: jiobp.com

Reliance BP Mobility Limited (d/b/a Jio-bp), is an Indian oil and gas company, a joint venture between Reliance Industries Limited (RIL) and BP. It is based in Navi Mumbai, Maharashtra, India. It is vertically integrated and is involved in hydrocarbon exploration, production, refining and also has interests in the downstream business and operates over 1700 Retail Fuel Outlets in India. It also operates the largest oil refinery in the world, situated in Jamnagar.

It owns/have long term chartered two oil rigs – DD KG-1 and DD KG-2 (DD standing for Dhirubhai Deepwater). They are both drilling ships registered in Marshall Islands and owned by Deepwater Pacific Inc., a subsidiary of Transocean.

== Jamnagar Refinery ==
With an annual crude processing capacity of 1,240,000 barrels (197,000 m^{3}) per stream day, RPL is the largest refinery in the world. It will have a complexity of 21.0, using the Nelson Complexity Index, ranking it one of the highest in the sector. The polypropylene plant will have a capacity to produce 0.9 million metric tonnes per annum.

The refinery project is being implemented at a capital cost of ₹27,000 crore being funded through a mix of equity and debt. This represents a capital cost of less than US$10,000 per barrel per day and compares very favourably with the average capital cost of new refineries announced in recent years. The International Energy Agency (IEA) estimates the average capital cost of new refinery in the OECD nations to be in the region of US$15,000 to US$20,000 per barrel per day. The low capital cost of RPL becomes even more attractive when adjusted for high complexity of the refinery.

== Controversies ==
In 2012, reports surfaced in the media highlighting the fact that ONGC had chartered an oil rig owned by RIL in May 2009 (Dhirubhai Deepwater KG-1, also known as DDKG-1) without taking bids from any other companies. This was revealed in the report published by the Comptroller and Auditor General of India (CAG), the overseer of expenditures of the Indian Government. RIL also owed ONGC ₹92,000 crores, which were already overdue by two years at that time. However, as of 2018, this outstanding amount was still not paid to ONGC by RIL.
