= V. Kumar Murty =

Indo-Canadian mathematician (born 1956)

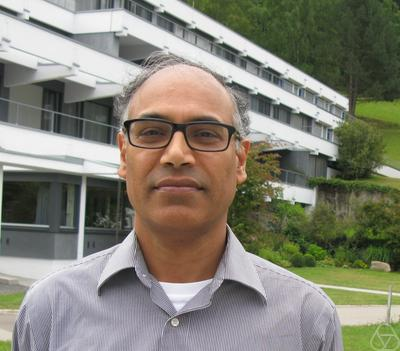
Kumar Murty

Vijaya Kumar Murty FRSC (born 20 May 1956) is an Indo-Canadian mathematician working in number theory.

== Biography ==
He and his brother, M. Ram Murty, have written more than 20 joint papers. In a book edited by Alex Michalos, there is a description of how the Murty brothers learned mathematics in their teens.

== Awards ==
Murty received the Coxeter–James Prize in 1991 from the Canadian Mathematical Society. He was elected to the Royal Society of Canada in 1995. In 1996, he, along with his brother, M. Ram Murty, received the Ferran Sunyer i Balaguer Prize for the book "Non-vanishing of L-functions and their applications."

In 2018, the Canadian Mathematical Society listed him in their inaugural class of fellows. He was named a Member of the Order of Canada in 2024.

Murty is a professor at the University of Toronto. In 2025, he was appointed as the founding director of the Lodha Mathematical Sciences Institute.
