= Palava City =

Integrated smart city in Maharashtra, India

- Residential and Commercial
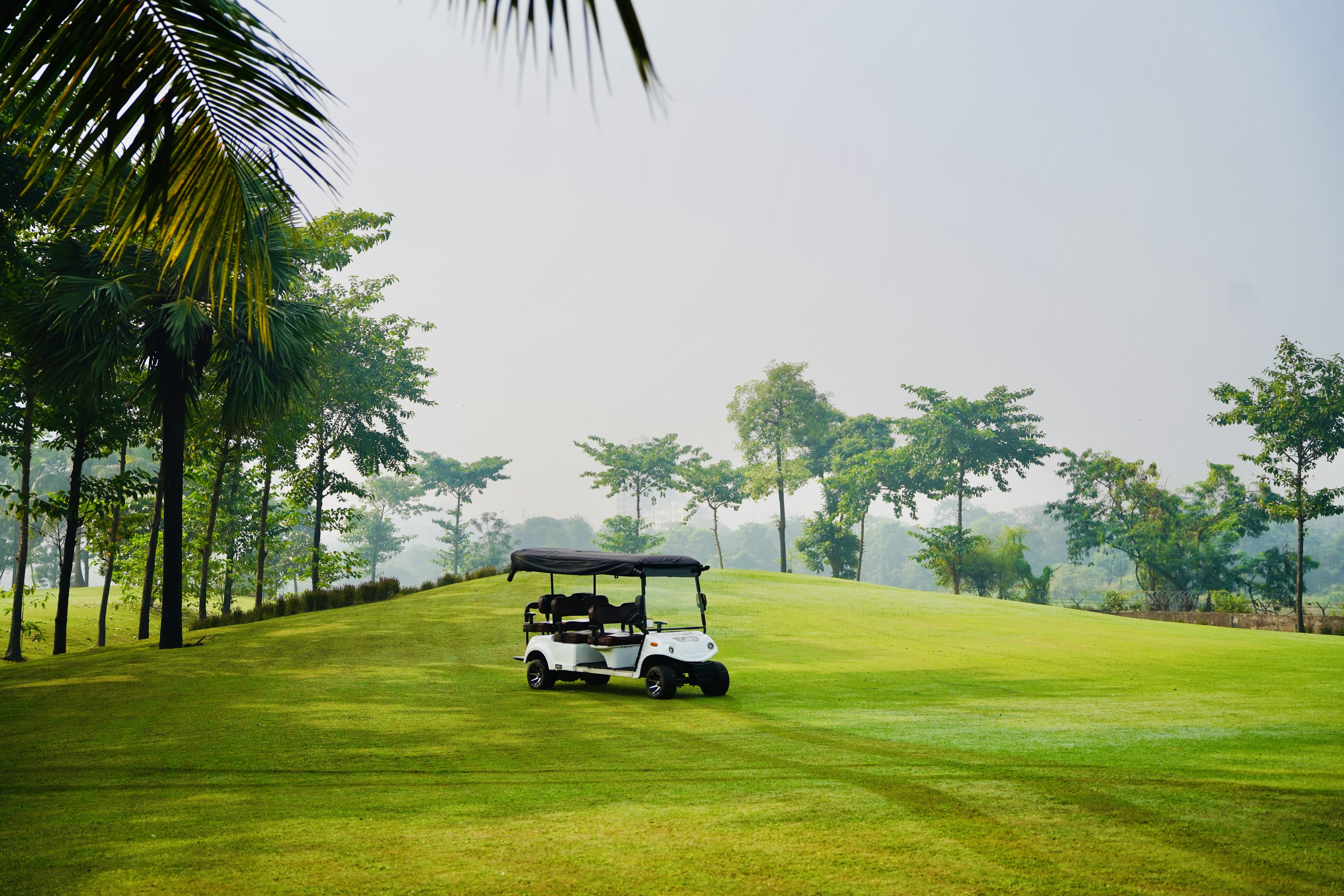
- 9-Hole Golf Course in Palava
- Interactive map of Palava City
- Coordinates: 19.168°N 73.074°E
- Country: India
- State: Maharashtra
- District: Thane
- Established: 2009
- Founder: Lodha Group

Government
  - Body: Palava City Management Association

Area
  - Total: 20.23 km^{2} (7.81 sq mi)
- Elevation: 10 m (33 ft)

Population (2023)
  - Total: 200,000
- Time zone: IST
- PIN: 421204
- Telephone code: 0251
- Website: www.lodhagroup.com/palava-city

Palava City is a planned urban township near Dombivli in Maharashtra, India. Developed by the Lodha Group, it spans approximately 5,000 acres and is strategically located between Thane, Navi Mumbai, and Kalyan. With a focus on sustainability, modern infrastructure, and community living, Palava City houses over 2 lakh residents across its first two phases. It was listed as India's No.1 smart city by Jones Lang LaSalle India's proprietary research report.

The city was featured by Discovery Channel in 2022.

== Development ==
Drawing inspiration from Singapore's urban planning success, Palava is built on the 5-10-15 neighbourhood planning principle, offering ample convenience to its residents: 5 minutes to retail and essentials, 10 minutes to parks and recreational areas, and 15 minutes to schools and commercial hubs. The first phase of Palava City, spread over approximately 300 acres (120 ha), was completed in 2016. By 2016, the company had sold 1,350 homes worth ₹690 crore within the township of Palava. The handover of 18,026 units to the customers was completed by December 2017. The second phase of the development began in 2014.

== Population ==
Palava City has over 2 lakh residents residing in Palava City phases 1 and 2. However, Phase 1 is completely sold out with over 18,000 families staying currently in Casa Bella, Casa Bella Gold, Casa Rio and Casa Rio Gold.

== Amenities ==
Palava City provides a wide range of amenities designed for urban convenience and a high quality of life:

- Green Spaces: Over 31,000 trees, multiple waterfront parks, and recreational areas spanning 60% of open spaces.
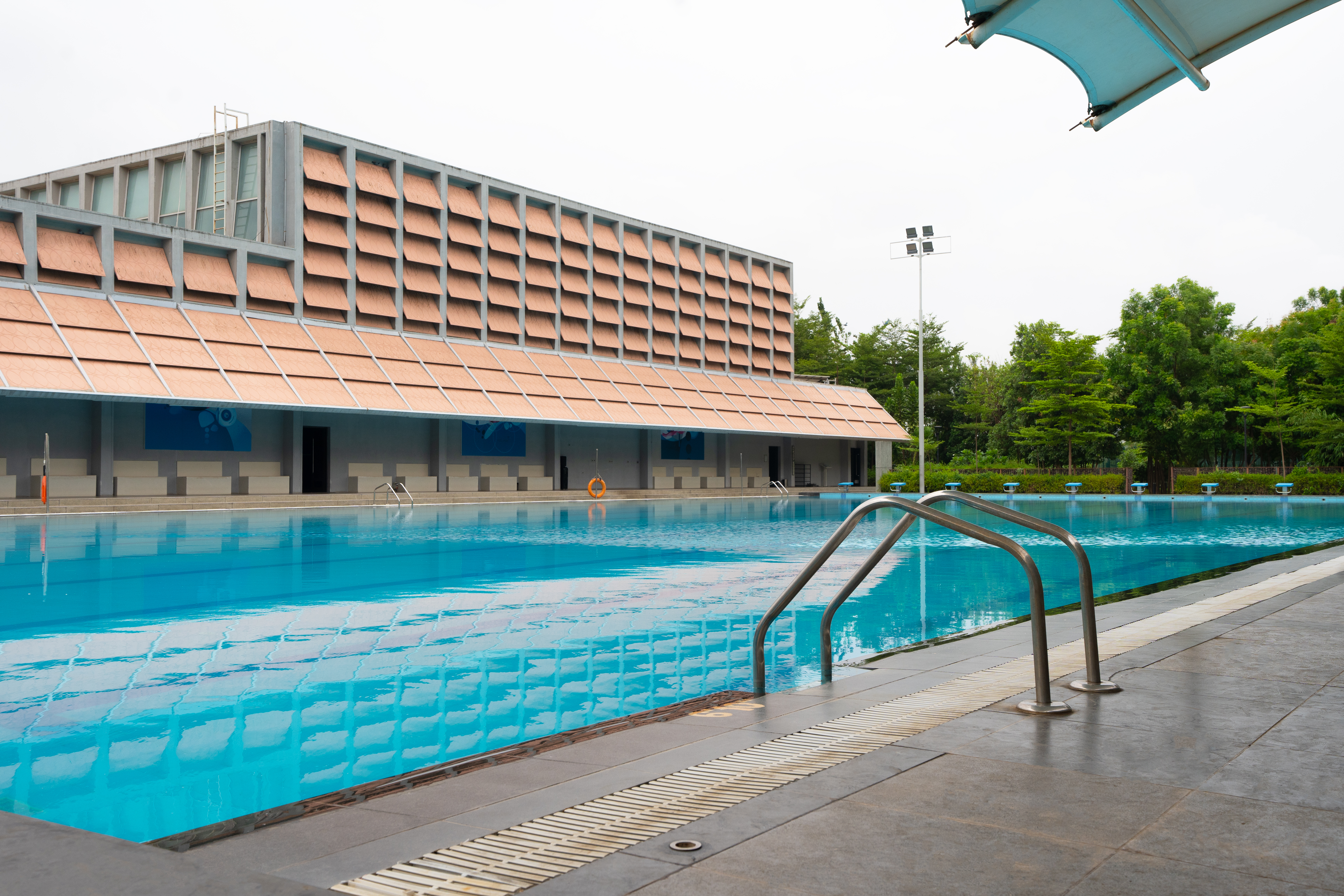
- Olympic-sized swimming pool in Palava
  Sports Facilities: Olympic-standard sports infrastructure, including a 50-meter swimming pool, football ground, cricket ground, and courts for tennis, squash, and badminton.
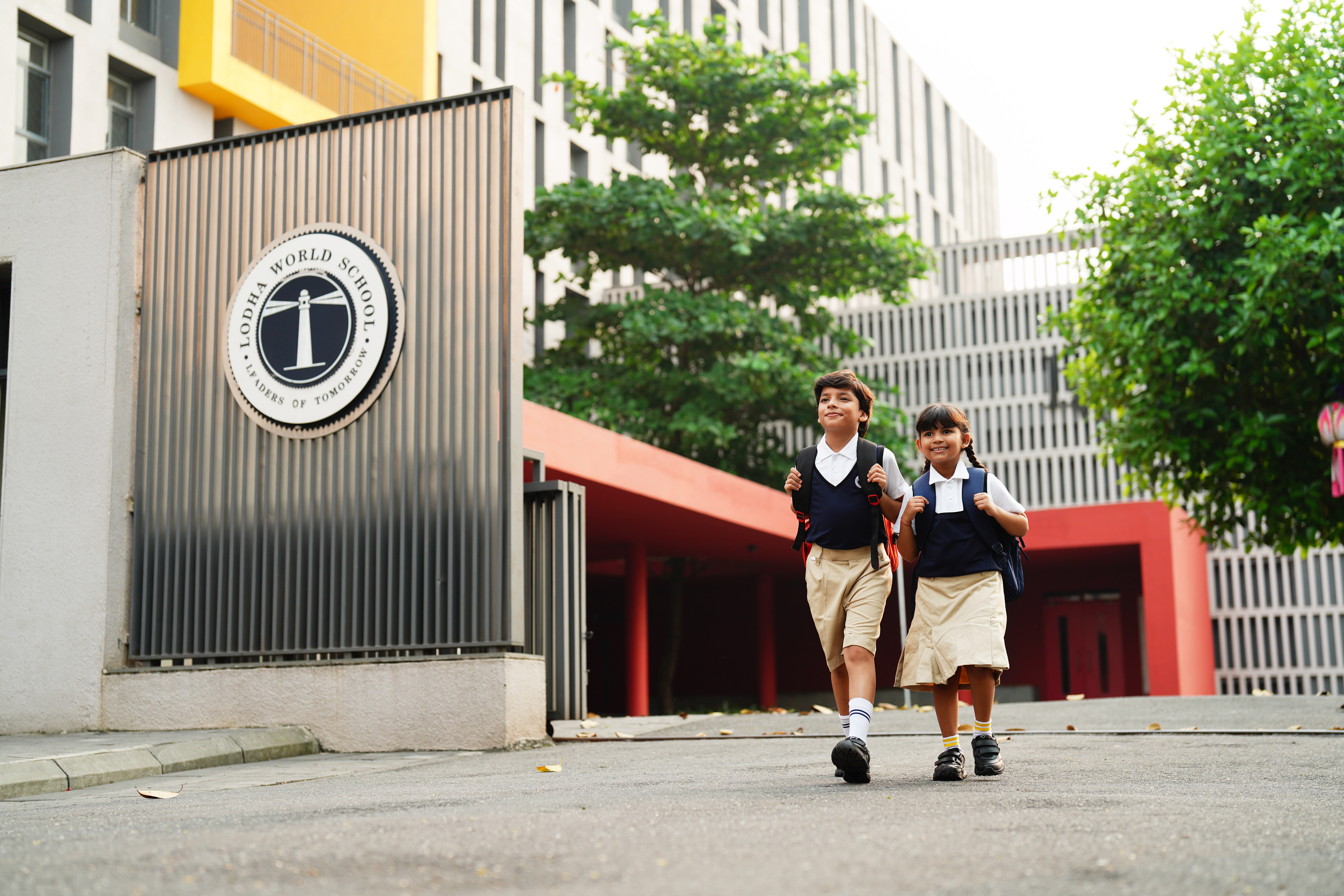
- Lodha World School in Palava City
  Education: Five operational schools offering CBSE, ICSE, and SSC curricula.
- Healthcare: Clinics and pharmacies within the city, with an upcoming 500-bed super-specialty Jupiter hospital nearby.
- Entertainment: Clubhouses, retail spaces, and Xperia Mall, one of the largest Grade-A malls in the region.
- Transport: Air-conditioned buses, smart mobility hubs, and upcoming metro stations to enhance connectivity.

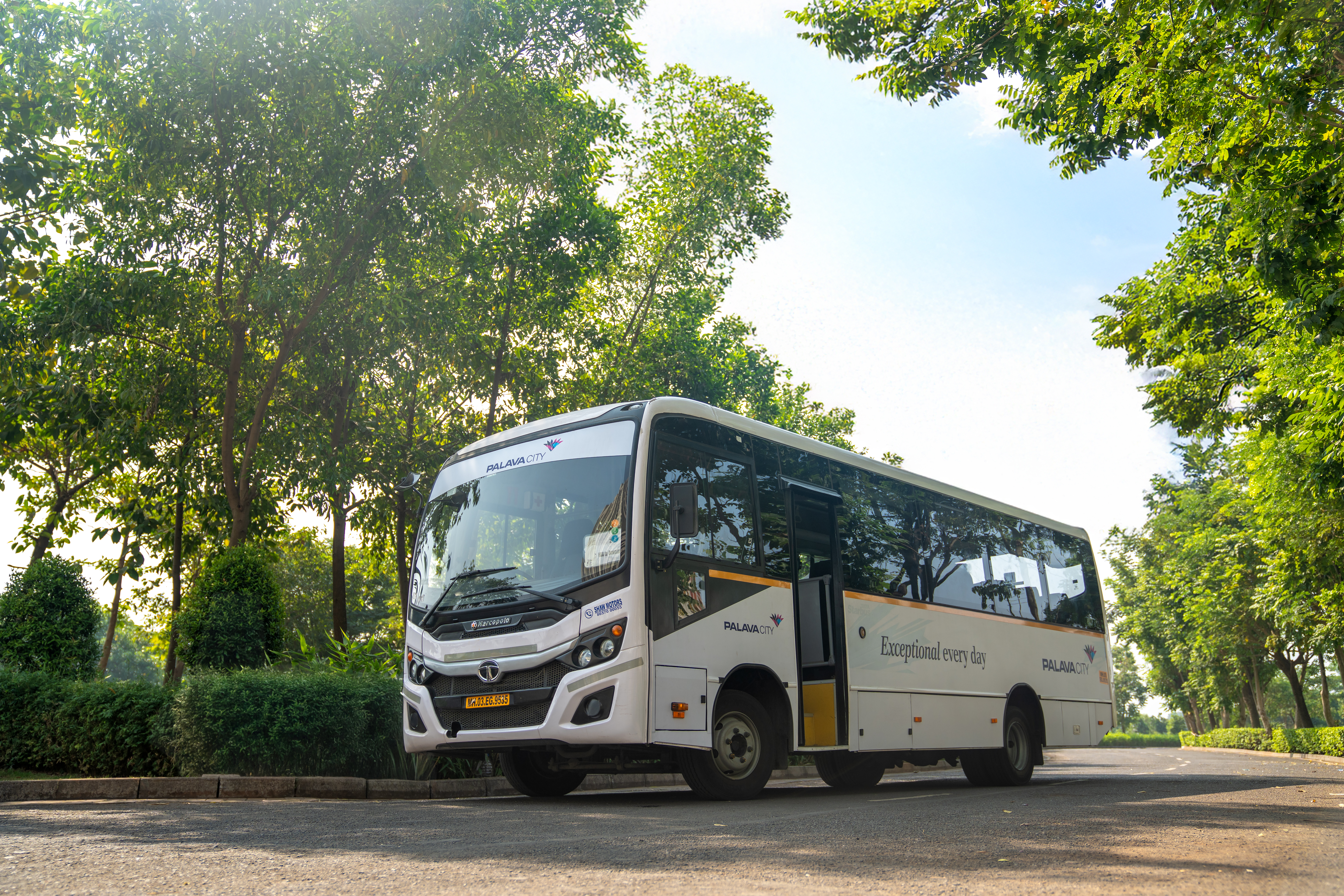
AC Buses in Palava for the residents

== Sustainability and Environmental Impact ==
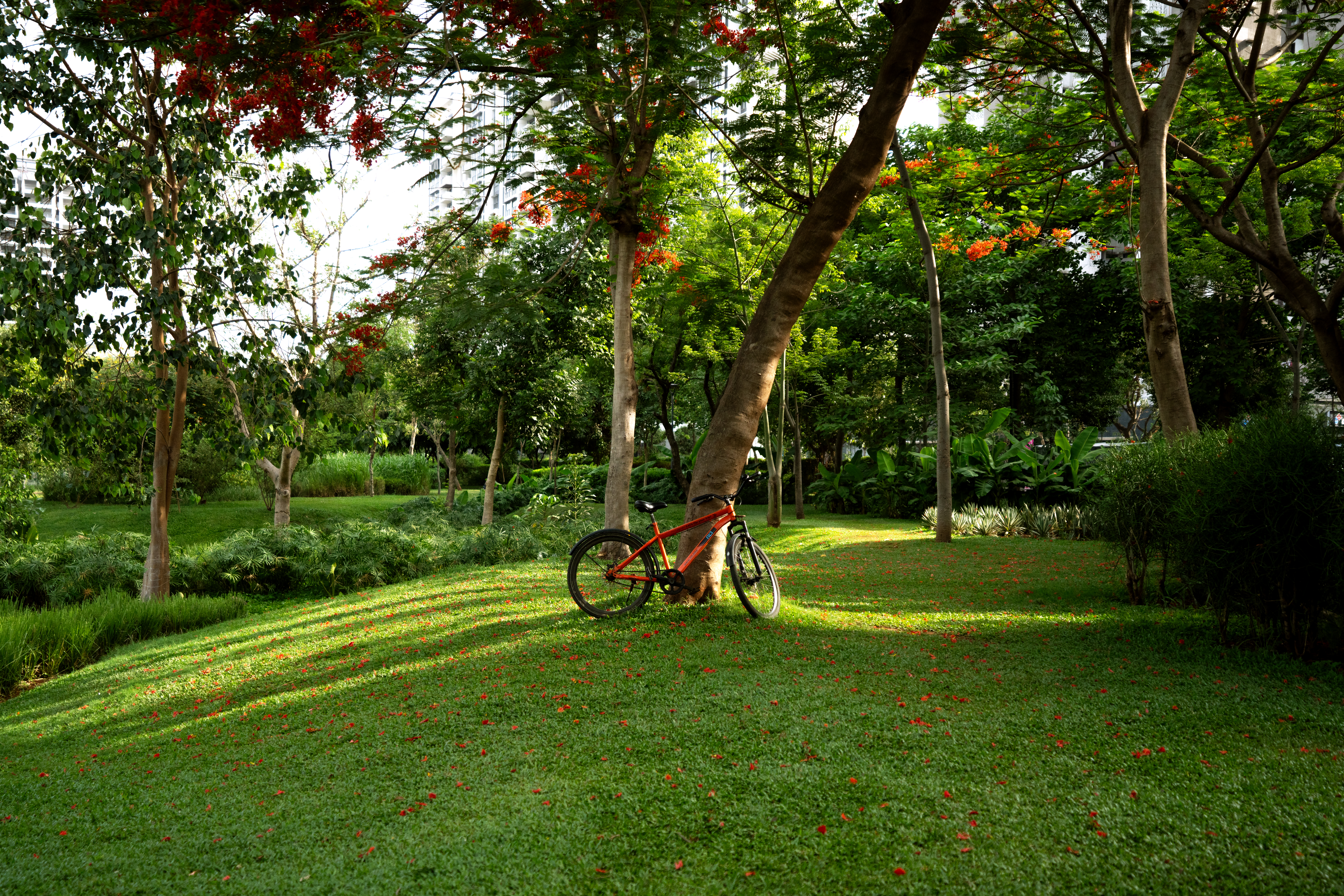

Palava City integrates sustainable practices into its design and operation:

- Air Quality: Significantly lower AQI compared to the Mumbai Metropolitan Region, with an annual average AQI below 100 for 350 days a year.
- Cooler Microclimate: Palava's maximum land surface temperature is 3 degrees Celsius cooler than Kalyan-Dombivli and 2 degrees lower than the temperature in Mumbai. This cooler environment significantly improves comfort levels for residents and reduces energy consumption.
- Water Management: Advanced water conservation techniques, including sewage treatment plants and smart water meters.
- Energy Efficiency: Solar installations and efficient waste management systems.

== Community and Events ==
Palava fosters a vibrant community spirit through annual events like:

- Palava Carnival: Showcasing art, culture, music, and cuisine.
- Palaso: The city's largest sporting event.

== Finances ==
Palava City has emerged as a significant economic hub:

- Revenue Projections: Expected to scale up and generate revenues worth $1 billion, or over Rs 8,000 crore per year, in the next few years, led by the development of residential and commercial properties including offices, a life sciences hub, warehousing & industrial spaces.

== See also ==
- Neuperlach
