= House of Abhinandan Lodha =

Indian real estate company

The House of Abhinandan Lodha (HoABL)
- Company type: Private
- Industry: Land development
- Founded: 2020
- Founder: Abhinandan Lodha
- Headquarters: Mumbai, India
- Area served: India
- Key people: Abhinandan Lodha (Chairman)
- Parent: Abhinandan Ventures

The House of Abhinandan Lodha (HoABL) is an Indian real estate company headquartered in Mumbai, Maharashtra. Founded in 2020 by Abhinandan Lodha, the company develops residential plotted land projects. As of 2024, it reported operations across 16 locations in India, including Goa, Himachal Pradesh, Maharashtra, Punjab, and Uttar Pradesh.

== History ==
HoABL was founded in 2020 by Abhinandan Lodha. It initially focused on land developments in the Konkan region of Maharashtra. Between 2022 and 2023, the firm expanded its land holdings into Goa and North India, acquiring 51 acres in Ayodhya. In January 2023, the company announced a capital expenditure plan of ₹11,000 crore to be deployed over a four-year period.

By late 2024, the firm reported additional investments totaling ₹3,000 crore for land acquisitions in Amritsar, Khopoli near Mumbai, Nagpur, Shimla, Varanasi, and Vrindavan, In November 2024, HoABL acquired the American Center property at Marine Lines, Mumbai, for ₹56 crore.

== Operations and business model ==
The company develops and manages land projects in Maharashtra (Alibaug, Anjarle, Dapoli, Khopoli, Nagpur, and Neral), Uttar Pradesh (Ayodhya and Vrindavan), Goa, Punjab (Amritsar), and Himachal Pradesh (Shimla). According to company reports, HoABL has a portfolio of over 1,000 acres of plotted developments, with 13 million square feet of land sold and an additional 34 million square feet in the development pipeline. The firm's business model utilizes a digital-only model, where all transactions are conducted through virtual platforms. In 2024, property acquisitions in HoABL projects were made by Amitabh Bachchan at The Sarayu in Ayodhya and Kriti Sanon at Sol de Alibaug. In 2025, the company entered the vertical housing segment through its Growth Housing initiative, beginning with a residential project in Naigaon, Mumbai, in partnership with Mittal Builders.

== Partnership ==
In June 2023, HoABL partnered with Indigo Hospitality for a restaurant project in Alibaug. Later that year, it formed a joint venture with HDFC Capital Advisors, investing ₹1,500 crore in plotted and low-rise developments across India. Additionally, it partnered with The Leela Palaces Hotels & Resorts to develop a hotel in Ayodhya in their The Sarayu project. In March 2025, HoABL launched the Land for Her campaign on International Women's Day.

== Recognition ==
In August 2025, the company was recognized by Guinness World Records for the largest floral mosaic logo (100 square metres) in Vrindavan.
