= Ambani =

Ambani is a Gujarati surname found in the Indian state of Gujarat.

Notable people:

- The Ambani business family of the Reliance Industries and Reliance Group fortune
  - Dhirubhai Ambani (1932–2002), Indian business executive; founder of Reliance
  - Mukesh Ambani (born 1957), Indian business executive, chairman and managing director of Reliance Industries; older son of Dhirubhai
  - Nita Ambani (born 1963), Indian business executive and philanthropist; wife of Mukesh
  - Anil Ambani (born 1959), Indian business executive, chairman and managing director of Reliance Group; younger son of Dhirubhai
  - Tina Ambani (born 1957), Indian business executive and philanthropist and former child actress; wife of Anil
