= Lodha Mathematical Sciences Institute =

Mathematical institute in Mumbai, India

- Type: Private
- Established: August 17, 2025; 14 months ago
- Interim Director: Manjul Bhargava
- Location: Mumbai, Maharashtra, India; 19.0379737°N 72.876273°E
- Campus: Urban
- Website: www.lmsi.org

The Lodha Mathematical Sciences Institute (LMSI) is a mathematical research centre located in Mumbai, India. It is India's only private mathematics research institute, inaugurated on August 17, 2025, in Mumbai.

== Mission and Vision ==
Mission - LMSI fosters an inclusive, collaborative, and meritocratic environment where mathematical ideas - from India and across the world - are explored, advanced, and shared for the greater good of humanity.

Vision - LMSI aspires to be a global leader in mathematical research - both fundamental and applied - to help build a better world.

== Leadership ==
The institute is led by V. Kumar Murty, an esteemed mathematician known for his contributions to number theory and arithmetic geometry. Dr. Murty holds a Ph.D. from Harvard and has served as the Director of the Fields Institute as well as a professor at the University of Toronto.

== Scientific Advisory Panel ==
LMSI is guided by a distinguished advisory panel of leading international researchers, including:

1. Manjul Bhargava (Princeton University)
2. Vikraman Balaji (Chennai Mathematical Institute)
3. Sourav Chatterjee (Stanford University)
4. Ravi Vakil (Stanford University; President-Elect of AMS)
5. Yakov Eliashberg (Stanford University)
6. Alexander Lubotzky (Weizmann Institute of Science)
7. Kavita Ramanan (Brown University)
8. François Labourie (Université de Nice Sophia Antipolis)
9. Siddhartha Mishra (ETH Zurich)
10. Mahan Mj (TIFR)
11. Ngô Bảo Châu (University of Chicago)
12. Raman Parimala (Emory University)
