= Altamount Road =

Neighbourhood in Mumbai, India

Altamount Road Billionaires’ Row
- Neighbourhood
- Location within Mumbai Location within Maharashtra Location within India
- Coordinates: 18.9681°N 72.8095°E
- Country: India
- State: Maharashtra
- City: Mumbai

Government
  - Body: Brihanmumbai Municipal Corporation
- PIN: 400026

Altamount Road, also known as India's Billionaires’ Row, is an affluent residential street in the southern region of Mumbai, India.

The area is notable for housing some of the highest real estate prices in the country. The locality consists of glamorous bungalows of old money business families, low rise Art Deco apartment buildings and modern high rises, alongside some of the city's most notable skyscrapers, including the most expensive private residence in the world; the Antilia, valued in 2023 at roughly US$4.6 billion. The street was also listed as the 10th most expensive street in the world.

The most prominent buildings on the street are Lodha Altamount, Antilia, One Altamount, Prithvi Apartments, Mafatlal Bungalow, Bombarci and Pemino.

== The street ==
On Altamount Road are the consulates of Indonesia (Plot no. 19) and of South Africa (Plot no. 20); on the connecting Carmichael Road are the Belgian, Chinese, and Japanese consulates. In 2008, it was rated as the 10th most affluent street in the world. Altamount Road is a very wealthy area, and also home to several industrialists. The Mafatlal complex is also located here. Also, it is home to Lodha Altamount which created history in November 2015 by selling the most expensive apartment in the country.

The road was officially renamed "S. K. Barodawalla Marg" in the 1990s, but residents, the city's taxi-drivers, and others continue to refer to it by its former name. It has a large number of trees and heritage buildings, such as the official residence of the Chairman of the Bombay Port Trust, the residence of the Municipal Commissioner of Mumbai, the consulate residence of Japan, Belgium and formerly the United States, and the official residence of the General Manager of Western Railways. The residential bungalow of the Bombay Port Trust was originally made by George Wittet, who also designed the Gateway of India and The Grand Hotel at Ballard Estate.

== Gallery ==
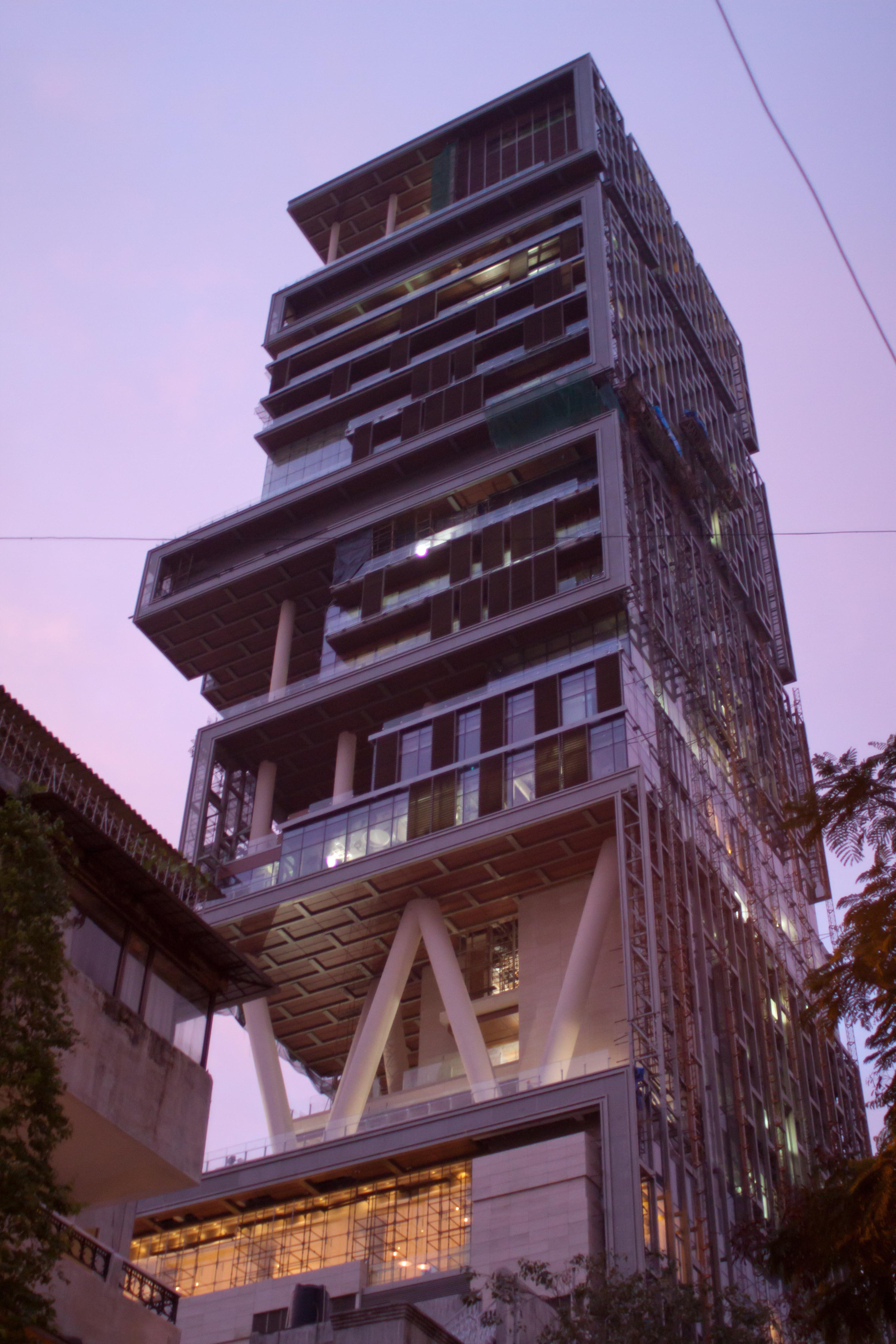
Mukesh and Nita Ambani's private skyscraper Antilia as seen from Altamount Road

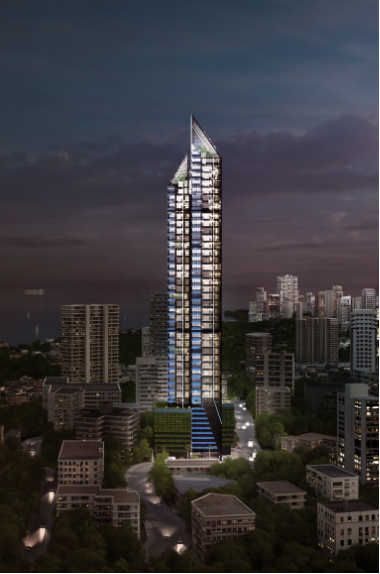
Lodha Altamount, a luxury residential skyscraper as seen from Billionaires' Row
