= Mukesh Ambani =

Indian businessman (born 1957)

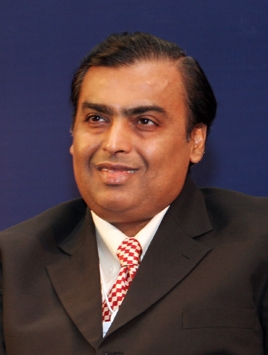
- Ambani in 2007
- Born: Mukesh Dhirubhai Ambani; 19 April 1957 (age 69); Aden, Aden Colony
- Education: St. Xavier's College, Bombay; Institute of Chemical Technology (B.E.)
- Occupation: Businessman
- Years active: 1981–present
- Organization: Reliance Industries
- Title: Chairman and MD of Reliance Industries
- Spouse: Nita Dalal (m. 1985)
- Children: 3
- Parents: Dhirubhai Ambani (father); Kokilaben Ambani (mother)
- Relatives: Anil Ambani (brother); Tina Ambani (sister-in-law)

Mukesh Dhirubhai Ambani (born 19 April 1957) is an Indian businessman. He is the chairman and managing director of Reliance Industries, the largest public company in India by market capitalisation in 2025. As of June 2026, he is the richest person in Asia and the 22nd richest in the world, with a net worth of US$91.8 billion. He has attracted fame due to his growth and wealth, and criticism for being a plutocrat, and reports of market manipulation, political corruption, cronyism, and exploitation.

Born in 1957 to Dhirubhai Ambani, the founder of Reliance Industries, and Kokilaben in Aden, Mukesh Ambani completed his studies at St. Xavier's College, Mumbai and Institute of Chemical Technology. He dropped out of Stanford University in 1980 to join Reliance Industries. He expanded the energy ventures of the company, and directed the set up of its largest petroleum refinery at Jamnagar. He took an increasing role in the company after his father developed health issues in the late 1980s. After the death of his father in 2002, the ownership of the companies in the group was divided between him and his younger brother Anil Ambani. Later, he expanded the portfolio of the group and launched or acquired several ventures in energy, finance, healthcare, media, telecommunications, and sports.

== Early life ==
Mukesh Dhirubhai Ambani was born on 19 April 1957 in the British crown colony of Aden (present-day Yemen) into a Gujarati Hindu family to Dhirubhai Ambani and Kokilaben Ambani. His father was the founder of Reliance Industries, the largest public company by market capitalization in India. He has a younger brother Anil Ambani and two sisters, Nina Kothari and Dipti Salgaonkar.

Ambani lived only briefly in Yemen because his father decided to move back to India in 1958 to start a trading business that focused on spices and textiles. The latter was originally named "Vimal" but later changed to "Only Vimal". His family lived in a modest two-bedroom apartment in Bhuleshwar, Mumbai, until the 1970s. The family's financial status slightly improved when they moved to India but Ambani still lived in a commune, used public transportation, and never received an allowance. Dhirubhai later purchased a 14-floor apartment block called 'Sea Wind' in Colaba, where Ambani and his brother lived with their families on different floors.

== Education ==
Ambani did his primary schooling from the Scindia School, Fort, Gwalior and senior secondary schooling from Hill Grange High School at Peddar Road, Mumbai, along with his brother and Anand Jain, who later became his close associate. After his secondary schooling, he studied at St. Xavier's College, Mumbai. He then received a BE degree in chemical engineering from the Institute of Chemical Technology.

Ambani later enrolled for an MBA at Stanford University (where Steve Ballmer was his classmate) but withdrew in 1980 to help his father build Reliance, which at the time was still a small but fast-growing enterprise. His father felt that real-life skills were harnessed through experiences and not by sitting in a classroom, so he called his son back to India from Stanford to take command of a yarn manufacturing project in his company.

Ambani was influenced by his teachers William F. Sharpe and Man Mohan Sharma because they are "the kind of professors who made you think out of the box."

== Career ==
Mukesh Ambani set up Reliance Infocomm Limited (later Reliance Communications Limited), which was focused on information and communications technology initiatives. At the age of 24, Ambani was given charge of the construction of Patalganga petrochemical plant when the company was heavily investing in oil refinery and petrochemicals.

Ambani directed and led the creation of the world's largest grassroots petroleum refinery in Jamnagar, India, which could produce 660,000 barrels per day (33 million tonnes per year) in 2010, integrated with petrochemicals, power generation, port, and related infrastructure. In December 2013, Ambani announced the possibility of a "collaborative venture" with Bharti Airtel in setting up digital infrastructure for the 4G network in India. On 18 June 2014, Ambani said he will invest Rs 1.8 trillion (short scale) across businesses in the next three years and launch 4G broadband services in 2015.

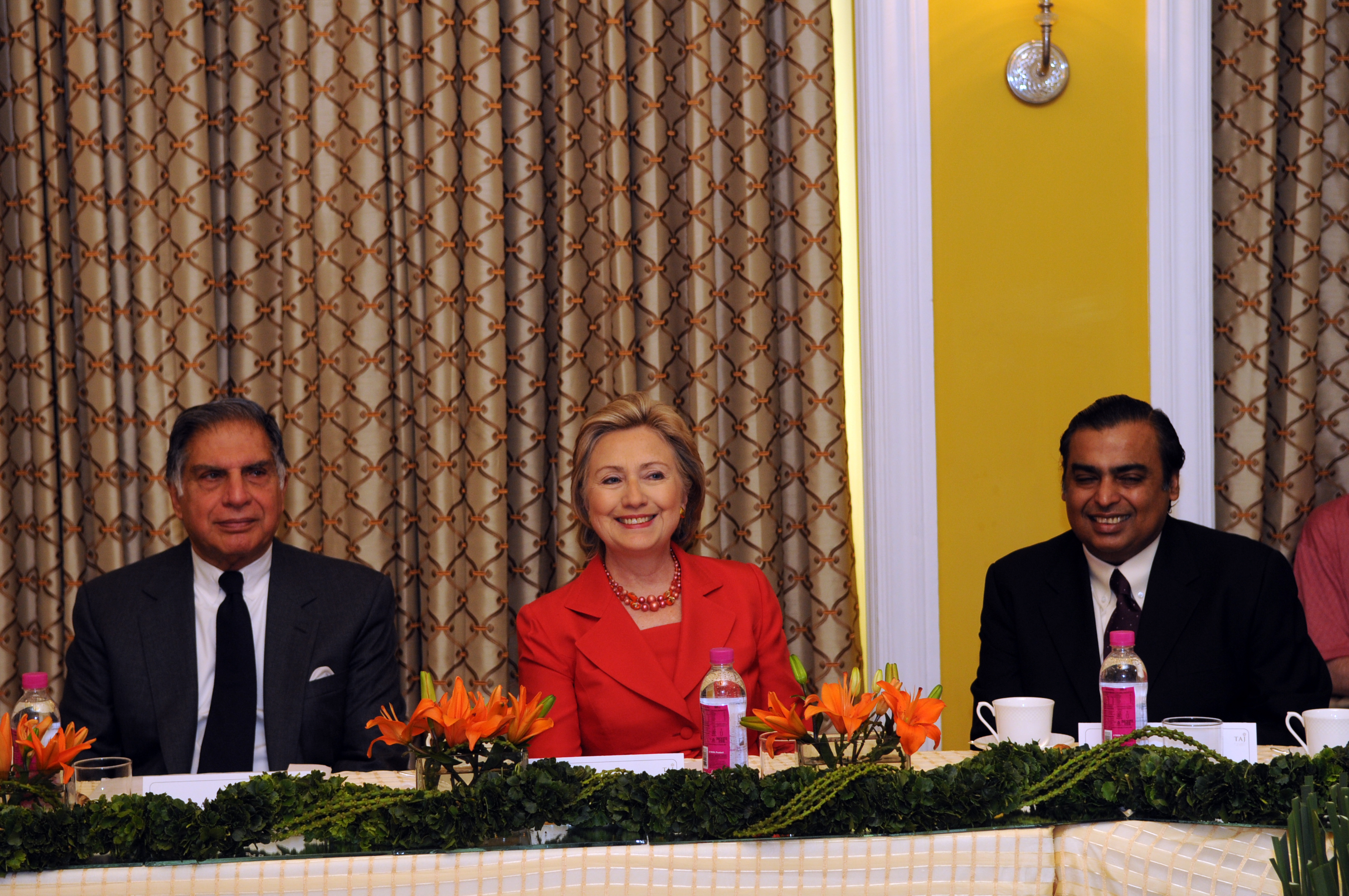
United States Secretary of State Hillary Clinton with Ratan Tata of the Tata Group (left) and Ambani (right) in July 2009

In February 2014, a First Information Report (FIR) alleging criminal offences was filed against Ambani for alleged irregularities in the pricing of natural gas from the KG basin.

Ambani was elected as a member of the National Academy of Engineering in 2016 for engineering and business leadership in oil refineries, petrochemical products, and related industries.

As of 2015, Ambani ranked fifth among India's philanthropists, according to China's Hurun Research Institute. He was appointed as a Director of Bank of America and became the first non-American to be on its board. As of 2016, Ambani was ranked as the 36th richest person in the world and has consistently held the title of India's richest person on Forbes magazine's list for the past ten years. He is the only Indian businessman on Forbes' list of the world's most powerful people. He surpassed Jack Ma, executive chairman of Alibaba Group, to become Asia's richest person with a net worth of $44.3 billion in July 2018. He is also the wealthiest person in the world outside North America and Europe.

As of February 2018, Bloomberg's "Robin Hood Index" estimated that Ambani's personal wealth was enough to fund the operations of the Indian federal government for 20 days.

Through Reliance, Ambani also owns the Indian Premier League franchise Mumbai Indians and is the founder of the Indian Super League, a football league in India.

Reliance Industries has faced criticism for maintaining business relations with Russia despite international sanctions imposed following Russia’s invasion of Ukraine in 2022. India imported 42% of its oil from Russia in 2025, up from 3% in 2021, with Reliance being the largest importer.

== Board memberships ==
- Member of Board of Governors Institute of Chemical Technology, Mumbai
- Chairman, managing director, Chairman of Finance Committee and Member of Employees Stock Compensation Committee, Reliance Industries Limited
- Former chairman, Indian Petrochemicals Corporation Limited
- Former vice-chairman, Reliance Petroleum
- Chairman of the board, Reliance Petroleum
- Chairman and Chairman of Audit Committee, Reliance Retail Limited
- Chairman, Reliance Exploration and Production DMCC
- Former director, Member of Credit Committee and Member of Compensation & Benefits Committee, Bank of America Corporation
- President, Pandit Deendayal Petroleum University, Gandhinagar, Gujarat
- Member of the Board of Trustees of the World Economic Forum.

== Awards and honors ==
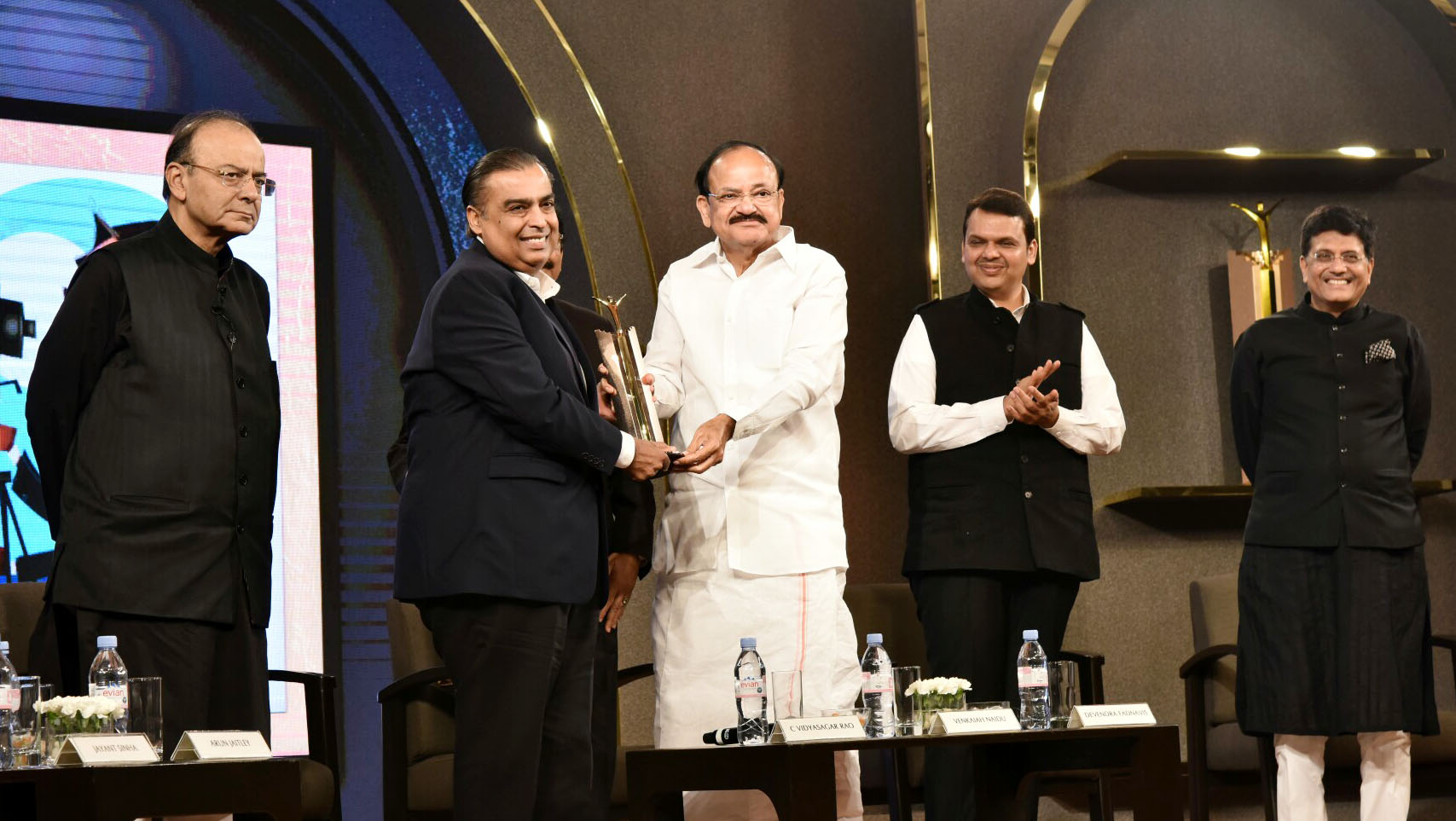
Vice President Venkaiah Naidu at an event gives The Economic Times Awards for Corporate Excellence to Shri Mukesh Ambani.

Year of award or honor	Name of award or honor	Awarding organization
2000	Ernst & Young Entrepreneur of the Year	Ernst & Young India
2010	Global Vision Award at The Awards Dinner	Asia Society
2010	School of Engineering and Applied Science Dean's Medal	University of Pennsylvania
2010	ranked 5th-best performing global CEO	Harvard Business Review
2010	Global Leadership Award	Business Council for International Understanding
2016	Foreign associate, U.S. National Academy of Engineering	National Academy of Engineering
2016	Othmer Gold Medal	Chemical Heritage Foundation

== Stock manipulation and penalty ==
For manipulating shares of Reliance Petroleum Limited (RPL), Reliance Industries was fined Rs. 950 crores (9.5 billion), split into 447 crores (4.47 billion) in retracted gains and 500 crores (5 billion) in interest in 2007. In April 2006, RPL went public as a Reliance subsidiary for Rs. 60 per share. The market crashed by 30% after it floated at roughly Rs. 100, and RPL was back at 60. By Securities and Exchange Board of India directive, RIL carried out an organised operation with the help of its agents to obtain unauthorised profits from the trading of its formerly listed unit, RPL, which was combined with the former in 2009.

== Cronyism ==
Ambani is noted for being close to Indian Prime minister Narendra Modi. Under Modi's rule, Ambani became the richest man in Asia.

== Personal life ==
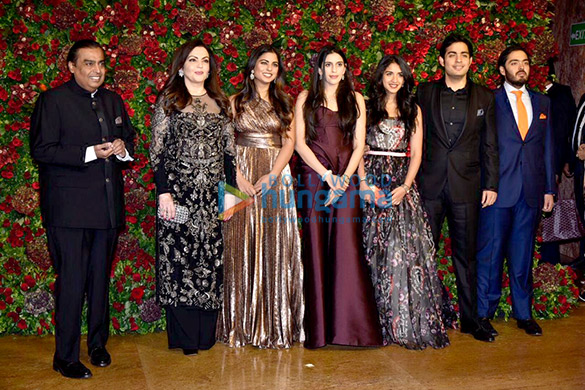
The Ambani family at the reception of Deepika Padukone and Ranveer Singh in 2018

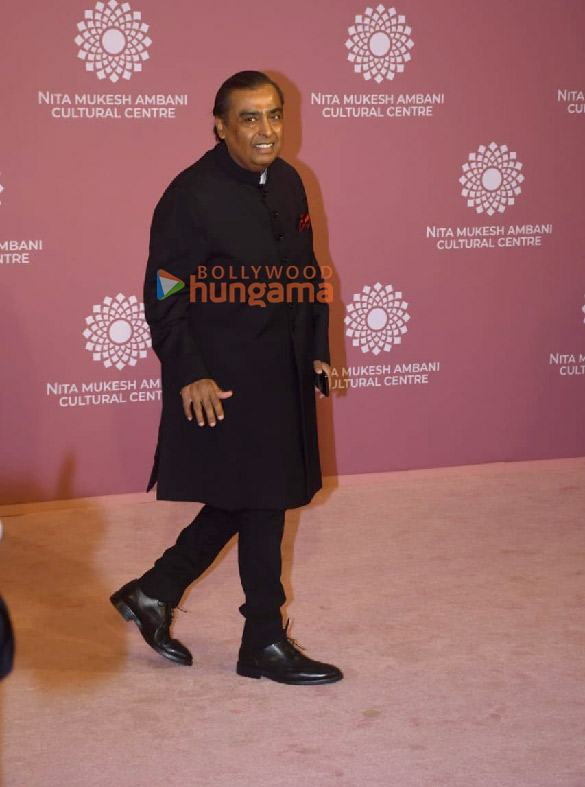
Mukesh Ambani attending the Nita Mukesh Ambani Cultural Centre Gala on Day 2

He married Nita Ambani in 1985 and they have two sons, Akash (born 23 October 1991) and Anant (born 10 April 1995), and a daughter, Isha Ambani, who is Akash's twin. They met after his father attended a dance performance which Nita took part in and thought of the idea of arranging a marriage between the two.

They live in Antilia, a private 27-storey building in Mumbai, which was valued at US$1 billion and was the most expensive private residence in the world at the time it was built. The building requires a staff of 600 for maintenance, and it includes three helipads, a 160-car garage, private movie theatre, swimming pool, and fitness centre.

Ambani was titled "The World's Richest Sports Team Owner" after he purchased the IPL cricket team Mumbai Indians for $111.9 million in 2008.

During the fiscal year ending 31 March 2012, he reportedly decided to forgo nearly ₹240 million from his annual pay as the chief of Reliance Industries Ltd (RIL). He elected to do this even as RIL's total remuneration packages to its top management personnel increased during that fiscal year. Mukesh Ambani holds a 50.4% stake in the company. This move kept his salary capped at ₹150 million for the fourth year in a row.

In early 2019, a court in Mumbai held his younger brother, Anil Ambani, in criminal contempt for non-payment of personally guaranteed debt Reliance Communications owed to Swedish gearmaker Ericsson. Instead of jail time, the court gave Anil a month to come up with the funds. At the end of the month, Mukesh Ambani bailed out his younger brother, paying the debt. In 2021, he was the subject of a bomb scare when a green Mahindra Scorpio SUV packed with explosives was found near a Mumbai skyscraper housing Ambani. In 2023, he received a death threat via email.

On 12 to 14 July 2024, the wedding of Anant Ambani and Radhika Merchant was held as a three-day event that took place at the Antilia building and Jio Convention Center in Mumbai. It had been described as India's "wedding of the year" and "India's own royal wedding". The New York Times described it as introducing "the world to [India]'s Gilded Age". Estimates for the wedding's cost range from $300 million to $600 million, and had led to criticism regarding wealth inequality in India. Anant Ambani recently donated a crown to Lalbaugcha Raja worth 15 crores.

In 2024, he acquired a Boeing 737 Max 9 aircraft, becoming India's first private owner of the aircraft. Purchased at about ₹1000 crores, it is be used by the Ambani family for their long-distance travels.

In September 2025, Ambani bought a building at 11 Hubert Street in the Tribeca neighborhood of New York City for about US$20 million. The former freight terminal is planned to be redeveloped into a luxury residence with amenities such as a swimming pool, sports courts, and a theater.

Ambani has maintained long-standing relationships with leading Bollywood actors, notably Shah Rukh Khan, Salman Khan, and Aamir Khan. Among them, Shah Rukh Khan has been especially close to the Ambani family, frequently attending their private celebrations, cultural events, and corporate functions. Salman Khan and Aamir Khan have also regularly appeared at Ambani family gatherings and have performed at large-scale events hosted by the family.
