= List of things named after presidents of India =

The president of India is the head of state of India. This is a list of things named after presidents of India.

== Sarvepalli Radhakrishnan ==
Educational institutions

- Dr. Radhakrishnan Government Medical College
- Dr. Sarvepalli Radhakrishnan Government Arts College
- Dr. Sarvepalli Radhakrishnan Rajasthan Ayurved University
- Sarvepalli Radhakrishnan University

Places

- Radhakrishnan Nagar

== Zakir Husain ==
Educational institutions

- Dr. Zakir Husain College, Sivagangai
- Zakir Husain Delhi College

Others

- Husain Sagar
- Zakir Husain Rose Garden

== V. V. Giri ==
Educational institutions

- V. V. Giri National Labour Institute

== Fakhruddin Ali Ahmed ==
Educational institutions

- Fakhruddin Ali Ahmed Medical College and Hospital

== Neelam Sanjiva Reddy ==
Stadiums

- Neelam Sanjiva Reddy Stadium

== K. R. Narayanan ==
Educational institutions

- K. R. Narayanan National Institute of Visual Science and Arts

== Pratibha Patil ==
Others

- Pratibha Mahila Sahakari Bank

== Droupadi Murmu ==
=== Organisms ===
- Melanochlamys droupadi (a sea slug species in Odisha)

== See also ==
- List of things named after prime ministers of India
- List of things named after Mahatma Gandhi
- List of things named after B. R. Ambedkar
- List of things named after C. Rajagopalachari
- List of things named after Vallabhbhai Patel
- List of eponymous roads in Delhi
- List of eponymous roads in Mumbai
- List of eponymous roads in Goa
