= List of things named after prime ministers of India =

The Prime Minister of India is the head of government of India. This is a list of things named after prime ministers of India.

== Morarji Desai ==
Educational institutions

- Morarji Desai National Institute of Yoga

Others

- Morarji Desai Setu

== Charan Singh ==
Airports

- Chaudhary Charan Singh Airport
  - Chaudhary Charan Singh International Airport metro station

Educational institutions

- Chaudhary Charan Singh Post Graduate College
- Chaudhary Charan Singh College of Law
- Chaudhary Charan Singh Haryana Agricultural University
  - Chaudhary Charan Singh Haryana Agricultural University Sports Complex
- Chaudhary Charan Singh University

== Chandra Shekhar ==
Educational institution

- Jananayak Chandrashekhar University

== P. V. Narasimha Rao ==
Educational institutions

- P. V. Narasimha Rao Telangana Veterinary University

Others

- P. V. Narasimha Rao Expressway

== Inder Kumar Gujral ==
Educational institutions

- I. K. Gujral Punjab Technical University

== Manmohan Singh ==
Others

- Dr. Manmohan Singh Expressway

== See also ==
- List of things named after presidents of India
- List of things named after prime ministers of Israel
- List of things named after prime ministers of the United Kingdom
- List of things named after Mahatma Gandhi
- List of things named after B. R. Ambedkar
- List of things named after C. Rajagopalachari
- List of things named after Vallabhbhai Patel
- List of eponymous roads in Delhi
- List of eponymous roads in Mumbai
- List of eponymous roads in Goa
