= Raman =

Raman may refer to:

== People ==
- Raman (name)
  - C. V. Raman (1888–1970), Indian Nobel Prize-winning physicist
  - Kocheril Raman Narayanan, President of India from 1997 to 2002

== Places ==
- Raman, Bathinda, India
- Raman, Rawalpindi, Pakistan
- Raman district, Yala Province, Thailand
  - Raman railway station
- Raman oil field, in Batman, Turkey

== Other uses ==
- Raman (crater), a lunar impact crater
- Raman (film), a 2008 Indian Malayalam film
- Raman scattering, a physical effect named after C. V. Raman
- Raman spectroscopy, an analytical technique based on Raman scattering
- Raman, a comic, and its title character, created by Pran Kumar Sharma

== See also ==
- Ramana (disambiguation)
- Ramani (disambiguation)
- Rahman (disambiguation)
- Rama (disambiguation)
- Ramen (disambiguation)
- Rehman (disambiguation)
- Ramman, or Hadad, a Canaanite storm and rain god
