= Ramani =

Ramani or Ramany may refer to:

- Ramana, Azerbaijan, a place in Baku, Azerbaijan
- Ramani Huria, a Tanzanian mapping project
- Ramany vs Ramany, an Indian Tamil-language comedy television series
  - Ramany vs Ramany 3.0
- Ramani (surname), an Indian surname
  - Ramani Bharadwaj, an Indian musician
  - Ramani Nallathambi, an Indian politician and MLA from Radhapuram, Tamil Nadu
- "Rockstar" Ramani Ammal (1954–2023), an Indian folk singer
- Ramani Ayer, an Indian-American business executive
- Ramani Bartholomeusz (1966–1987), Sri Lankan actress and model
- Ramani Durvasula, an Indian-American psychologist
- Ramani Fernando, a Sri Lankan hairstylist
- Ramani Gabharu, the empress consort of Mughal emperor Muhammad Azam Shah
- Ramani Moonesinghe, a Sri Lankan-British medical doctor
- N. Ramani (1934–2015), an Indian Carnatic music flautist
- P. S. Ramani (born 1938), an Indian neurosurgeon
- Ramani Perera (born 1976), Sri Lankan cricketer

== See also ==
- Raman (disambiguation)
