= Rahman =

Rahman (Arabic: رَحْمَٰنِ or رَحْمَانِ) may refer to:

- Ar-Rahman, one of the names of God in Islam (see also: Rahmanan)
- Surat Ar-Rahman, the 55th sura of the Qur'an

== People ==
- Rahman (name), an Arabic male personal name
- A. R. Rahman (born 1967), Indian music composer and singer
- Rahman (actor) (born 1967), Indian actor
- Rahman (Bengali actor) (1937–2005)
- Md. Motiar Rahman, Bangladeshi politician and businessman
  - Short form of Abd al-Rahman

== Places ==
- Rahman, Casimcea, Tulcea, Romania
- Rahmanabad-e Zagheh-ye Lalvand, or Rahman, Lorestan Province, Iran
- Deh-e Rahman, or Rahman, Sistan and Baluchestan Province, Iran

== See also ==
- Al rahman (disambiguation)
- Rachman
- Rahma (disambiguation)
- Rahmans
- Raman (disambiguation)
- Ramen (disambiguation)
- Rehman (disambiguation)
