= List of eponymous roads in Goa =

List of roads in Goa named after people

This is a list of roads in Goa named after people.

Road	Named after	Location	Notes
T. B. Cunha Road	T. B. Cunha	Panaji	
D. B. Bandodkar Road	Dayanand Bandodkar	Panaji	
M. G. Road	Mahatma Gandhi	Panaji	
Rua Afonso de Albuquerque	Afonso de Albuquerque	Panaji	; Now renamed to M. G. Road
Av. Teófilo Braga Road	Teófilo Braga	Panaji	
Atmaram Borkar Road	Atmaram Borkar	Panaji	
Pandurang Pissurlekar Road	Pandurang Pissurlekar	Panaji	
Fr. Agnelo Road	Agnelo de Souza	Panaji	
Dada Vaidya Road	Dada Vaidya	Panaji	
Gama Pinto Road	Pio Gama Pinto	Panaji	Between Municipal Quarters and Hotel Palacio
Cunha Rivera Road	Joaquim Heliodoro da Cunha Rivara	Panaji	
P Shirgaonkar Road	P Shirgaonkar	Panaji	
Governador Pestana Road	José Ferreira Pestana	Panaji	
Menezes Braganza Road	Luís de Menezes Bragança	Panaji	
Braganza Pereira Road	?	Panaji	Between Municipal Quarters and Kala Academy
Dr Jack de Sequeira Road	Jack de Sequeira	Panaji	
Rua Heliodoro Salgado	Heliodoro Salgado	Panaji	
Minguel Rod Road	Minguel Rod	Cortalim	
Fr Freddy J. da Costa Road	Freddy J. da Costa	Varca	
C. Alvares Road	C. Alvares	Sangolda	
B. B. Borkar Road	Bakibab Borkar	Porvorim	
Dr. Luis Proto Barbosa Road	Luis Proto Barbosa	Arossim	
Dr. P. S. Ramani Road	P. S. Ramani	Wadi Talaulim	
F. L. Gomes Road	Francisco Luís Gomes	Vasco da Gama	
Fr. Joseph Vaz Road	Joseph Vaz	Vasco da Gama	
Dattatray Deshpande Road	Dattatray Deshpande	Vasco da Gama	
Reginald Fernandes Road	Reginald Fernandes	Siolim	
Abade Faria Road	Abbé Faria	Margao	
Chris Perry street	Chris Perry	Margao	
Ernest Borges Road	Ernest Borges	Dona Paula	
Ernest Borges Road	Ernest Borges	Ucassaim	
Fr. Planton Faria Road	Fr. Planton Faria	Cuncolim	
Dr Germano Fernandes Road	Dr Germano Fernandes	Cuncolim	
Tomazinho Cardozo Road	Tomazinho Cardozo	Candolim	
