= Muchhad paanwala =

Muchhad Panwala is famous pan shop in mumbai

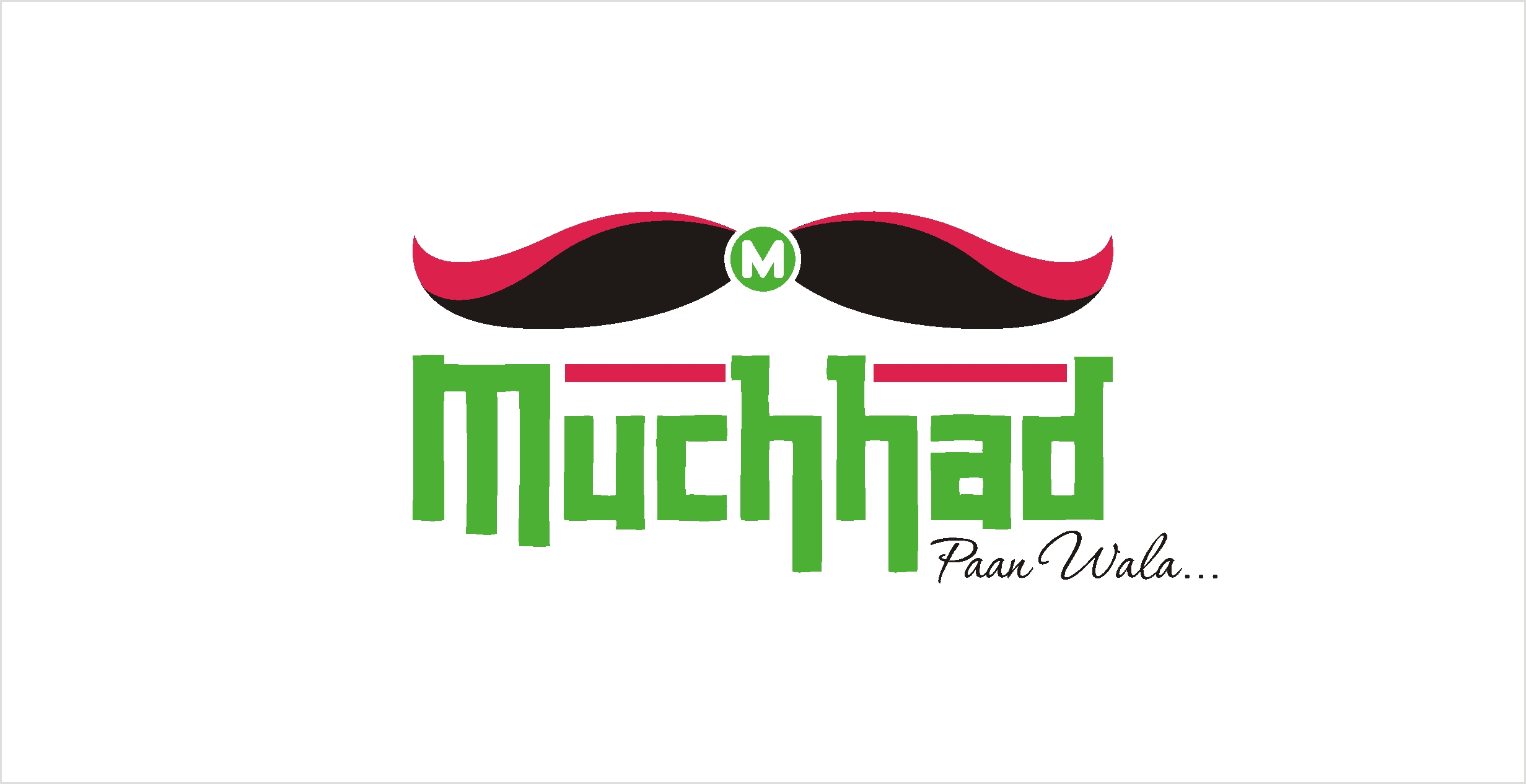
Muchhad

Muchhad Paanwala is a paan shop based in Mumbai. The shop has been featured in the "10 paanwalas in Mumbai you must visit" by Times of India. The shop is a landmark in Kemps Corner, where it is located. It caters to a wide range of customers, including actors and businessmen. Actor Jackie Shroff is one of the frequent visitors. The shop is currently run by Jaishankar Tiwari, the third generation proprietor from Tiwaripur in Uttar Pradesh.

The business commenced with Jay Shankar Tiwari who came from Allahabad . He started Muchhad Paanwala venture in 1977 where the shop stands today. His son Ramkumar Tiwari followed on his footsteps and took over the business, with its popularity increasing beyond his expectations.

== Products ==
The shop offers a variety of paans. The varieties of sweet paans include Kolkata Sweet, Gundi sweet, Maghai Sweet, Chocolate Sweet, Special Sweet, Pineapple and Raspberry Sweet.
