= Ramana =

Ramana may refer to:

- Ramana, Pakistan, place in Pakistan
- Ramana, Azerbaijan, place in Azerbaijan
- Chintapalli Ramana, Indian writer in Telugu cinema
- Mullapudi Venkata Ramana, Indian screenwriter in Telugu cinema
- Ramana Maharshi, Indian Hindu spiritual figure
- Ramana Reddy, Indian actor in Telugu cinema
- Ramana (actor), Indian actor in Tamil cinema
- Ramana (director), directed several Tamil language films in the 2000s
- Ramanaa, a 2002 Indian Tamil-language film by A. R. Murugadoss

== See also ==
- Raman (disambiguation)
- Rama (disambiguation)
