= Rejman =

Rejman is a surname. Notable people with the surname include:

- Miroslav Rejman (1925–2008), Czech ice hockey player
- Sebastian Rejman (born 1978), Finnish singer, actor, and television host
- Travis Rejman, American activist

== See also ==
- Rehman (disambiguation)
