= Shankar Sheth Road =

Shankarsheth Road may refer to:

- Shankarsheth Road, Mumbai
- Shankarsheth Road, Pune
