= List of things named after prime ministers of Israel =

== David Ben-Gurion ==
- Ben Gurion Airport
- Ben Gurion Airport railway station
- Ben-Gurion University of the Negev
- Ben-Gurion Heritage Institute
- Ben-Gurion Medal
- Kiryat HaMemshala ("Kiryat Ben-Gurion")
- Midreshet Ben-Gurion
- Ben-Gurion Boulevard (Tel Aviv)

== Moshe Sharett ==
- Moshe Sharett Memorial Site

== Levi Eshkol ==
- Eshkol National Park
- Eshkol Power Station
- Eshkol Regional Council

== Golda Meir ==
- Golda Meir School in Milwaukee, Wisconsin.
- Golda Meir Institute for Leadership and Society
- Golda Meir Interchange
- University of Wisconsin–Milwaukee Libraries ("Golda Meir Library")
- Golda Park
- Ramat Golda

== Yitzhak Rabin ==
- Yitzhak Rabin Center
- Yitzhak Rabin Park
- Rabin Medical Center
- Rabin Interchange
- Orot Rabin
- Rabin Square (where Rabin was assassinated)
- Wadi Araba Crossing ("Yitzhak Rabin Crossing")

== Menachem Begin ==
- Kiryat Menachem Begin
- Begin Road
- Taba Border Crossing ("Menachem Begin Crossing")
- Begin Sports Hall
- Begin Doctrine
- Menachem Begin Heritage Center

== Yitzhak Shamir ==
- Shamir Medical Center
- Ramat Shamir
- Shamir Research Institute
- Yitzhak Shamir Road

== Shimon Peres ==
- Shimon Peres Place, an intersection in New York City.
- Shimon Peres Square in Rio de Janeiro.
- Shimon Peres Negev Nuclear Research Center
- Peres Park
- Peres Center for Peace
- Peres Academic Center
- Naot Peres
- Peres Medical Center

== Ariel Sharon ==
- Ariel Sharon Park

== See also ==
- List of things named after prime ministers of India
- List of things named after prime ministers of the United Kingdom
