= Raman (name) =

Raman is a name of Indian origin, used both as a family name and as both a feminine and a masculine given name. Raman is also a Belarusian variant of the given name Roman. There may be other origins also.

== Surname ==
- Avadhanam Sita Raman (1919–2001), Indian writer, journalist and editor
- Aneesh Raman (active from 2005), American journalist and entrepreneur
- Aroon Raman (active from 1991), Indian entrepreneur and author
- B. Raman (1936–2013), Indian intelligence officer
- Bangalore Venkata Raman (1912–98), Indian astrologer and writer
- Benito Raman (born 1994), Belgian footballer
- Bhavani Raman, Indian historian
- C. Raman (active 1960), Indian civil servant and administrator
- C. V. Raman (Chandrasekhara Venkata Raman; 1888–1970), Indian physicist who won the 1930 Nobel Prize for Physics
  - Raman scattering (AKA Raman effect), inelastic photon scattering, for the discovery of which C. V. Raman was awarded the Nobel Prize
  - Raman spectroscopy, a technique which relies on Raman scattering
  - Raman amplification, used in optical fibres
  - For other articles connected with C. V. Raman and with Raman scattering and spectroscopy, see the article on C. V. Raman
- Cheruvayal Raman (1952–2026), Indian farmer
- Dinesh Raghu Raman (died 2007), Indian Army officer posthumously awarded the Ashoka Chakra for bravery
- E. S. S. Raman (born 1954), Indian politician
- K. Raman (active 2019), Indian politician
- Krishnan Raman (c. 11th century AD), Commander-in-chief of the Chola forces under Rajendra Chola
- Mohan Raman (born 1956), Indian film and television actor and management trainer
- Mythili Raman (active from 2013), American lawyer
- Nithya Raman (born 1981), American politician and activist
- P. S. Raman (born 1960), Indian lawyer
- Pallathu Raman (1892–1950), Indian poet, writer, social reformer and community leader
- Prawaal Raman (active from 2000), Indian film director and screenwriter
- Priya Raman (active 1993–99), Indian actress and film producer in Malayalam
- Radha Raman (disambiguation)
- Sarangapani Raman (1920 – after 1948), Indian footballer
- Sonia Raman (born 1974), American basketball coach
- Sumanth C. Raman (active from 1995), Indian television anchor and sports commentator in Tamil
- Sundar Raman (born 1971 or 1972), Indian sports business professional
- T. V. Raman (born 1965), Indian computer scientist
- Theruvath Raman (1917–2009), Indian journalist, writer, publisher and social activist
- U. C. Raman (born 1965), Indian politician
- V. P. Raman (1932–91), Indian lawyer and politician
- Varadaraja V. Raman (born 1932), Indian-born American academic in the field of humanities
- Vidyullekha Raman (born 1991), Indian film actress and theatre performer
- Vimala Raman (active from 2006), Indian film actress, model and Bharatanatyam dancer
- Woorkeri Raman (born 1965), Indian international cricketer
- Poovin Thomas Raman(born 1973), South African doctor of medicine
- Nevita Raman(born 1999), medical doctor South Africa
- Navindra Raman(born 1971), dental surgeon South Africa.

== Given name: Indian origin ==
- Raman Bhardwaj (b 1976) mural artist, illustrator, painter, USA.
- Laxmi Raman Acharya (1914–97), Indian politician
- Raman Bedi (active from 1996), English academic and organiser in the field of dental care
- Raman Bhardwaj (active from 1997), Scottish broadcast journalist, television presenter and producer
- Yussif Raman Chibsah (born 1993), Ghanaian footballer
- Raman Ghosh (active 1960s – 1970s), Indian badminton player
- Raman Kalyan (active 2015), Indian Carnatic flute player
- Rewati Raman Khanal (active 2014), Nepali litterateur
- Raman Lamba (1960–98), Indian international cricketer
- Raman Mahadevan (active from 2003), Indian playback singer
- Raman Malhotra (born 1968), British ophthalmologist and oculoplastic surgeon
- Raman Maroo (active 2010), Indian film producer
- Raman Mundair (active from 1998), Indian-born British poet, writer, artist and playwright
- Erkkara Raman Nambudiri (1898–1983), Indian priest and scholar who helped revive the ancient Vedam-Yajnam traditions in Kerala
- Raman Osman (1902–92), Governor General of Mauritius 1972–77
- Raman Parimala (born 1948), Indian mathematician
- C. V. Raman Pillai (1858–1922), Indian novelist, playwright and journalist in Malayalam
- Chenganoor Raman Pillai (1886–1980), Indian Kathakali artist
- Kappazhom Raman Pillai (1868–1924), Indian civil servant in Travancore who achieved the office of Dewan Peishcar
- Raman Raghav (AKA Psycho Raman; 1929–95), Indian serial killer
- Dilli Raman Regmi (1913–2001), Nepali scholar, political figure and historian
- Raman Subba Row (born 1932), English international cricketer
- Raman Sharma (1945–99), Indian cricket umpire
- Radha Raman Shastri (born 1943), Indian politician, former Speaker of the Legislative Assembly of Himachal Pradesh
- Raman Sukumar (born 1965), Indian ecologist
- Raman Pratap Singh (born before 1994), Fijian lawyer and politician
- Raman Singh (born 1952), Indian politician
- Rewati Raman Singh (born 1943), Indian politician
- Raman Patrick Sisupalan (born 1980), English footballer
- Raman Sundrum (born before 1990), American theoretical physicist after whom the Randall–Sundrum model is named
- Raman Srivastava (born before 1973), former Director General of the Indian Border Security Force
- Raman Vijayan (born 1977), Indian association football manager and former player

== Given name: Belarusian origin ==
- Raman Astapenka (born 1980), Belarusian professional footballer
- Raman Hrabarenka (AKA Roman Graborenko; born 1992), Belarusian professional ice hockey player
- Raman Jaraš (born 1978), Belarusian musician
- Raman Kirenkin (born 1981), Belarusian international footballer
- Raman Makarau (active 2004), Belarusian paralympic swimmer who competed in the 2004 Paralympic Games
- Raman Piatrushenka (AKA Roman Petrushenko; born 1980), Belarusian sprint canoer who has competed in three Summer Olympics
- Raman Pratasevich (or Roman Protasevich; born 1995), Belarusian journalist
- Raman Ramanau (born 1994), Belarusian professional racing cyclist
- Roman Rubinshteyn (born 1996), Belarusian-Israeli basketball player in the Israeli Basketball Premier League
- Raman Skirmunt (1868–1939), Belarusian statesman, aristocrat and landlord
- Roman Sorkin (born 1996), Israeli basketball player in the Israeli Basketball Premier League
- Raman Stsyapanaw (born 1991), Belarusian footballer
- Raman Svirydzenka (born 2004), Belarusian cross-country skier
- Raman Tsishkou (born 1994), Belarusian professional racing cyclist.
- Raman Vasilyuk (born 1978), Belarusian footballer
- Roman Zaretski (born 1983), Belarusian-Israeli ice dancer

== Given name: Other or uncertain origin ==
- Raman Hui (born 1963), Hong Kong animator and film director
