= Hand of history =

Political phrase

The 'hand of history' is a phrase coined by British Prime Minister Tony Blair in April 1998 during negotiations for the Good Friday Agreement.

== Context and original use ==
On 7 April 1998 the negotiations for the Good Friday Agreement were close to collapse due to the unease of the Ulster Unionist Party leader David Trimble over the extent of cooperation between Northern Ireland and Dublin. Blair flew to Belfast and spoke outside Hillsborough Castle. In a statement delivered to television cameras in the entrance portico of the castle Blair said that "A day like today is not a day for soundbites, we can leave those at home, but I feel the hand of history upon our shoulder with respect to this, I really do". Blair has said that the phrase came to him spontaneously.

== Later analysis of the phrase ==
In 2018 Blair said that he now recalls the phrase with a "...mixture of pride because I think it's quite a good phrase and embarrassment, because, obviously, having just said 'Now is not the time for soundbites', I gave one". Blair's advisers Alastair Campbell and Jonathan Powell immediately asked him if he remembered what he'd just said as his statement was paradoxical. Powell later wrote in his memoir, Great Hatred, Little Room, that he had "...propelled him [Blair] straight back out without giving him time to prepare carefully what he would say" as they had been anxious to start negotiating. Blair's usual method would be to carefully rehearsing his statements for several minutes before making them.

In a 2018 article in The Irish Times, journalist David Young felt that the phrase was a "satirist's dream" as Blair's New Labour government had been "...accused of putting spin ahead of substance" and Blair had "served up a juicy soundbite in the very same sentence he had warned against them". Powell felt the quote was one of Blair's "most awkward, but equally one of his most memorable soundbites".
