= Jonathan Powell (civil servant) =

British civil servant and diplomat (born 1956)

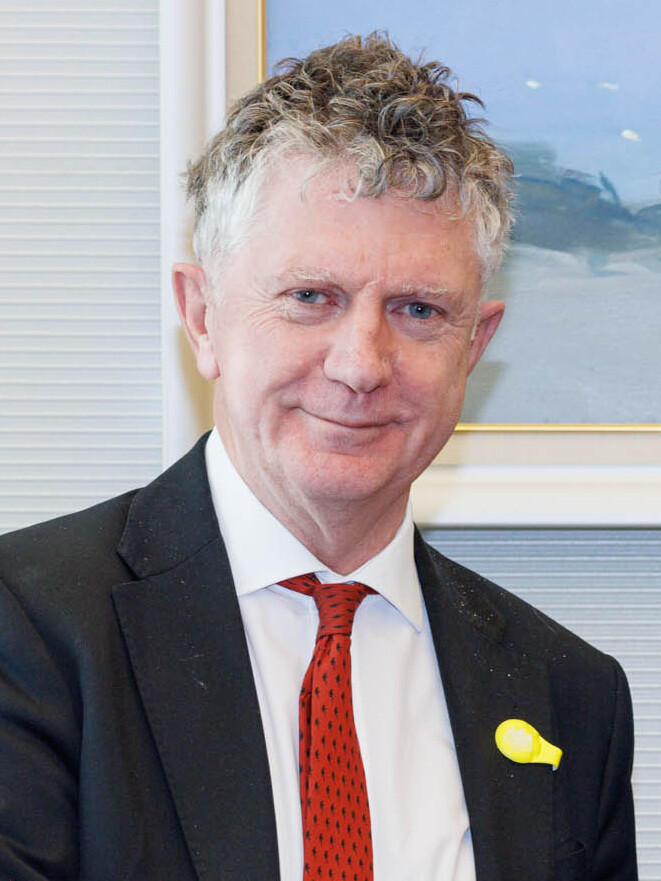
- Powell in 2026

United Kingdom National Security Adviser
- Incumbent
- Assumed office 2 December 2024
- Prime Minister: Keir Starmer; Andy Burnham
- Preceded by: Tim Barrow

Downing Street Chief of Staff
- In office 2 May 1997 – 27 June 2007
- Prime Minister: Tony Blair
- Preceded by: David Wolfson (1985)
- Succeeded by: Tom Scholar

Chief of Staff to the Leader of the Opposition
- In office 1995 – 2 May 1997
- Leader: Tony Blair
- Succeeded by: Sebastian Coe

Personal details
- Born: Jonathan Nicholas Powell; 14 August 1956 (age 70)
- Party: Labour
- Spouse: Sarah Helm
- Children: 4
- Education: University College, Oxford; University of Pennsylvania
- Occupation: Diplomat

Jonathan Nicholas Powell (born 14 August 1956) is a British civil servant, politician, and former diplomat who has served as the UK National Security Adviser (NSA) under Keir Starmer since 2024, and under Andy Burnham since 2026. He previously served as Downing Street Chief of Staff from 1997 to 2007 under Tony Blair. During this period Powell was also the chief British negotiator in the Northern Ireland peace process.

In 2007, Powell joined Morgan Stanley as a full-time senior managing director of its investment banking division. He runs the charity Inter Mediate, which works on armed conflicts around the world. In 2014, David Cameron appointed Powell to be the UK's special envoy to Libya.

In 2024, UK Prime Minister Keir Starmer appointed Powell as a special envoy to resolve the Chagos Archipelago sovereignty dispute. Following the signing of an agreement in May 2025 in which the UK ceded sovereignty of the Chagos Archipelago to Mauritius while retaining a 99-year lease on the Diego Garcia military base he was appointed by Prime Minister Starmer to serve as the UK National Security Adviser.

== Early life and education ==
Powell is the son of Air Vice-Marshal John Frederick Powell. He has three brothers: Charles Powell, Baron Powell of Bayswater, who was foreign policy adviser to former Prime Minister Margaret Thatcher; Sir Christopher Powell, a former advertising executive (in the Labour Party's advertising agency from 1972 to 1997); and Roderick. Although Powell pronounces the family name in the conventional manner (to rhyme with 'towel'), Charles pronounces it as 'pole'.

Powell was educated at the Cathedral Choir School, Canterbury, and the King's School, Canterbury. He took a 2:1 in history from University College, Oxford; was a postgraduate at the University of Pennsylvania. He then worked for the BBC as a journalist and Granada TV before joining the Foreign Office in 1979.

== Career ==
=== Diplomatic career ===
Powell joined the FCO in 1979 and was posted as Third Secretary, later Second Secretary, to Lisbon in 1981. He was subsequently posted to UKDEL CDE (UK Delegation to the Conference for Disarmament in Europe) Stockholm in 1986 and to UKDEL CSCE (UK Delegation to the Conference on Security and Cooperation in Europe) Vienna in September 1986. In November 2010, Powell wrote an article for The Guardian that was critical of the publication by WikiLeaks of the contents of US diplomatic cables. Powell argued, "It is very difficult to conduct diplomacy effectively when your confidential deliberations are made public in this way. Mutual trust is the basis of such relations and once that trust is breached, candid conversations are less likely. It is like having a conversation in the pub with your best mate about problems with your girlfriend and then finding the content, possibly with a bit of spin added, posted on the internet. You won't be having that conversation again any time soon."

During his posting to Washington DC, Powell connected to Bill Clinton. He later described Clinton as a "long-shot candidate" and explained that they got in touch "because he had been at my college at Oxford".

Powell was desk officer for the negotiations on giving Hong Kong back to the Chinese in 1983–85, and for the Two Plus Four talks on German unification from 1989 to 1990. Powell was posted to the British Embassy in Washington in 1991 and attached himself to Bill Clinton's Presidential campaign as an observer. He later introduced Tony Blair to Bill Clinton and his team after the election.

=== Downing Street Chief of Staff ===
Shortly after his election as Leader of the Labour Party, Tony Blair asked Powell to become his chief of staff. Powell initially declined the offer, although he later left the diplomatic service in 1995 to become the Chief of Staff to the Opposition Leader. Following Labour's election victory in 1997, Powell was given the new official role of Downing Street Chief of Staff, a new position with the power to issue orders to civil servants, which was unprecedented for a political appointee.

In the early years of the Blair Government, one of Powell's most crucial jobs was his role in the Northern Ireland peace talks that led to the Good Friday Agreement. In March 2008, Powell called for tactics used successfully in Northern Ireland to be applied to the war on terrorism. He suggested that western governments hold talks with Al Qaeda and the Taliban, just as the British government negotiated with the Provisional IRA in order to bring about a peace deal in Northern Ireland. His suggestion was publicly rejected by the British Foreign Office. His book Great Hatred, Little Room: Making Peace in Northern Ireland details the negotiations which led to the Agreement which devised and put in place a devolved, power-sharing government for Northern Ireland.

Powell continued to be both a key right-hand man for Blair throughout his time in office, as well as a trusted adviser on a wide range of policy issues. He was described by The Guardian as being "at the heart of all his (Blair's) key foreign policy initiatives." It is believed he was questioned twice by police, the second time under caution, during the investigation into the Cash for Honours affair. While many in Blair's "kitchen cabinet" – including Alastair Campbell – departed before Blair's resignation, Powell remained in Downing Street until June 2007.

In February 2012 Peter Oborne, a Daily Telegraph journalist, criticised Powell for divulging sensitive information about the activities of MI6 in Russia. He told a BBC documentary, Putin, Russia and the West, how MI6 had in 2006 used a "fake rock filled with surveillance devices as a means of communication with their agents in Moscow". Oborne described this as a "propaganda gift for Vladimir Putin", as it soon after featured heavily in a programme screened on prime-time Russian state TV. The footage was used to attack opponents of Putin who at the time, in 2006, had doubted Kremlin reports of MI6's activity in Russia. In the view of Oborne, "Powell's indiscretion was used to make a full-frontal attack on some of the most respected independent critics of the regime" and Powell had become a "useful idiot" for Putin.

=== Post Downing Street ===
Powell was a banker at Morgan Stanley from 2007 to 2009. In 2011 he founded the charity Inter Mediate with Martin Griffiths to work on armed conflicts around the world. Since 2013 he has also been a member of the Board of Save the Children International.

In May 2014 British prime minister David Cameron appointed Powell as the UK special envoy to Libya to promote dialogue between rival factions in the country.

In March 2017 he was appointed Honorary Professor in the Senator George J. Mitchell Institute for Global Peace, Security and Justice at Queen's University Belfast.

Throughout 2023 and 2024, Powell reportedly helped to establish channels of communication between UK intelligence services and the Syrian paramilitary group Hay'at Tahrir al-Sham. As head of Inter Mediate, which had a significant presence in Syria during the Syrian civil war, Powell arranged meetings between Western officials and HTS leader Ahmed al-Sharaa which were aimed at persuading al-Sharaa to abandon armed conflict and enter "regular politics". Powell's efforts were credited with making Syria safe enough for Western officials to visit after the fall of the Assad regime and al-Sharaa's ascendance to president of Syria.

In September 2024, Labour Prime Minister Keir Starmer appointed him as an envoy to negotiate with British Indian Ocean Territory and Mauritius regarding the Chagos Archipelago sovereignty dispute. On 3 October an announcement from the UK and Mauritius stated that the issue had been resolved and that the UK was to hand over the Chagos Islands to Mauritius.

=== National Security Adviser ===
On 8 November 2024, he was announced as the next National Security Adviser, in succession to Sir Tim Barrow, and as such will once again be based in No 10 Downing Street. He took up the appointment in December 2024.

In 2025 Bridget Phillipson stated Powell had no role in the collapsed case against two men accused of spying for China. The Conservatives have suggested Powell, had a role in not giving prosecutors evidence they said they needed to secure convictions.

Following the outbreak of the 2026 Iran war, The Guardian revealed that Powell had acted as an adviser during the preceding Geneva nuclear talks. Powell reportedly viewed the Iranian proposals as a significant basis for a deal, a position that contributed to the UK’s initial reluctance to support the subsequent U.S.-led military strikes.

== Inquiries ==
Powell's role as Downing Street Chief of Staff came under close scrutiny during the Hutton Inquiry, held following the death of David Kelly in 2003. Powell gave evidence to the inquiry on 18 August, and described several crucial meetings he had attended at which Kelly had been discussed before his name appeared in the media. An email sent by Powell to the JIC chairman John Scarlett in September 2002 was also highlighted, as it appeared to suggest that a dossier on the threat posed by Iraq should be toughened. Many commentators criticised the style of government described by Powell as too informal, some dubbing it "sofa government", as many meetings were held in relaxed surroundings without proper notes being taken. The subsequent and separate Butler Report also emphasised these criticisms. Both the Hutton and Butler reports indicated Powell was very close to Blair.

On 18 January 2010 Powell gave evidence to the Iraq Inquiry.

== Personal life ==
Powell has four children: two daughters with wife, Sarah Helm, and two sons from a previous marriage.

His nephew, Hugh, was the Deputy National Security Adviser, appointed during the coalition Government in 2013.

In October 2026, The Spectator reported that Helm, had posted on X defending Hamas, questioning reports of sexual violence by the group on 7 October 2023, comparing Israel to Nazi Germany, and criticising the UK government for alleged “appeasement” of Israel.

== Publications ==
- Great Hatred, Little Room: Making Peace in Northern Ireland, The Bodley Head, 2008. ISBN 1-84792-032-2.
- The New Machiavelli: How to Wield Power in the Modern World, The Bodley Head, 2010. ISBN 1-84792-122-1.
- Talking to Terrorists: How to End Armed Conflicts, The Bodley Head, 2014, ISBN 9781847922298; published in the United States with the title Terrorists at the Table: Why Negotiating Is the Only Way to Peace, Palgrave Macmillan, 2015, ISBN 9781250069887.
- The Public Sector: Managing the Unmanageable, Kogan Page, 2013. ISBN 978-0-7494-6777-7. (Contributor).

== Radio ==
- On Machiavellian Politics Jonathan Powell speaks on BBC The Forum

== See also ==
- Tony Blair Associates - Powell worked as a consultant

Government offices
Preceded by David Wolfson	Downing Street Chief of Staff; 1997–2007	Succeeded by Tom Scholar
