= Sarah Helm =

British journalist and writer

Sarah Helm (born 2 November 1956) is a British journalist and non-fiction writer. She worked for The Sunday Times and The Independent in the 1980s and 1990s. Her first book A Life in Secrets, detailing the life of the secret agent Vera Atkins, was published in 2005.

== Early life ==
Sarah Helm was educated at Millfield School and Girton College, Cambridge.

== Career ==
On completing her English studies at Cambridge, Helm became a reporter for The Sunday Times. In 1986, she moved to the newly founded The Independent where she wrote several official secrets articles. For her coverage of the Spycatcher controversy she received the British Press Award for Specialist Writer of the Year. In 1987, she won the Laurence Stern Fellowship, allowing her to work as an intern for The Washington Post. As The Independent's Diplomatic Editor from 1989, she covered the fall of the Berlin Wall, the Gulf War and developments in the Middle East. From 1995, she covered European affairs in Brussels.

In 2007, Helm married her long-time partner, Jonathan Powell, who had been Tony Blair's chief of staff since 1997.

Helm's first book, A Life in Secrets: The Story of Vera Atkins and the Lost Agents of SOE (2005) traces the lives of missing female members of the Special Operations Executive and intricate details of the woman who searched for them. It was acclaimed by both The New York Times and The Washington Post. Her play Loyalty (2011) is a semi-fictional view of the Iraq War, said to have drawn on the views of her husband who was Tony Blair's chief of staff. Her latest book, If This Is A Woman: Inside Ravensbruck: Hitler's Concentration Camp for Women (2015), provides accounts of the lives and deaths of thousands of female prisoners in the Ravensbrück concentration camp.

Responding to Adam Boulton, who had criticised Sally Rooney for her support for Palestine Action, Helm wrote, "God help us authors who support Palestine and Palestine Action. Sounds like Adam would have all our books swept off the shelves in a jiffy". The Metropolitan Police stated, "The post was assessed by specialist officers and it was determined that it did not meet the criminal threshold. No further police action will be taken".
