= Gopalrao Deshmukh Marg =

- Location within Mumbai Location within Maharashtra Location within India
- Coordinates: 18.97°N 72.8061°E
- Country: India
- State: Maharashtra
- District: Mumbai City
- Metro: Mumbai

Languages
  - Official: Marathi
- Time zone: UTC+5:30 (IST)
- PIN: 400026
- Vehicle registration: MH 01

Gopalrao Deshmukh Marg formerly known as Pedder Road is an arterial road in the city of Mumbai, India, passing through the affluent Cumballa Hill neighbourhood. The road is named after a social activist and first Mayor of Bombay (present-day Mumbai) after India's Independence, Dr. Gopalrao Deshmukh.

== Details ==
It is said to be resting on what was first known as Padam Hill. Its former name, Pedder Road, was named after Mr. W. G. Pedder, Municipal Commissioner (1879) who was in the Bombay Civil Service, 1855–1879, and on his retirement was appointed Secretary to the Revenue and Commerce Department at the India Office. Even today as with a very large number of Mumbai's roads it is commonly referred to by its former name (usually incorrectly spelled as Peddar).

The road begins at the well-known intersection of Kemp's Corner and extends down Cumballa Hill past the Mahalaxmi temple to the Haji Ali intersection. The first flyover built in Mumbai connected Hughes Road to Gopalrao Deshmukh Marg at Kemp's Corner. Since at least the early 20th century, it is considered to be a posh residential area with some of the flats fetching a price of over ₹10 crore (US$1.0 million) as of 2006.

Dr. Gopalrao Deshmukh was the first president of the Indian Medical Association and the first Mayor of Bombay after independence. He lived on Pedder Road in a home that later made way for a multi-story building.

Pedder Road came to be renamed in his honour. The road ends in a flyover which was known as the Kemp's Corner flyover before but has been rechristened as "Dr Gopalrao Deshmukh Uddanpul(Flyover)".

In February 2000, Indian Institute of Technology, Bombay carried out a study on traffic in the area which found that 94,000 vehicles used the route every day at that time. The same study also found that the average number of cars owned by a family living in Gopalrao Deshmukh Marg was 2.3.

According to a Times of India article in 2006, in new constructions coming up on Gopalrao Deshmukh Marg (among other localities), transactions "routinely take place" at over ₹1 lakh (US$1,000) per square foot.

== Landmarks ==
- Jaslok Hospital (inaugurated 6 July 1973)
- Sophia College
- Jindal House
- Residence Quarters of the Income Tax Department
- Russian Cultural Centre
- Films Division of India
- Antilia (building)
- Mafatlal Bungalow

== Notable residents ==
- Guru Dutt, film actor and film director
- Lata Mangeshkar, singer
- V. Shantaram, film director-producer and Jayshree, actress
- Asha Bhosle, singer
- Madhav Apte, former cricketer
- Madan Mohan, music director
- Madhubala, actress and producer
- Kalyanji-Anandji, music director
