= If This Is a Woman =

2015 book

- First edition
- Author: Sarah Helm
- Language: English
- Subject: Ravensbrück Concentration Camp
- Genre: History
- Publisher: Little, Brown
- Publication date: 2015

If This Is A Woman: Inside Ravensbruck: Hitler's Concentration Camp for Women is a 2015 book by Sarah Helm about the Ravensbrück Concentration Camp.

Yvonne Roberts of The Observer wrote that the book's "title powerfully echoes If This Is a Man".

== Background ==
Helm learned about the camp whilst writing about the British Special Operations Executive. Helm visited various countries to conduct research, including France, Israel, the Netherlands, and Poland.

== Reception ==
Joanna Bourke in The Daily Telegraph wrote that the author "never sensationalises" the "viciousness" of female guards and does not show a reluctance to illustrate "the surreal horror that overwhelmed prisoners, particularly when they first arrived at the camp." She rated the book five out of five stars.
