= List of things named after prime ministers of the United Kingdom =

This is a list of things named after prime ministers of the United Kingdom. Many different things have been named after people who have been Prime Minister of the United Kingdom, including places, roads, parks, schools, ships, pubs, mountains and buildings.

== Robert Gascoigne-Cecil, 3rd Marquess of Salisbury ==
- Salisbury, the former name of Harare, Zimbabwe

== Arthur Balfour ==
- Balfour Declaration
- Balfour Declaration of 1926
- Arthur Balfour Conservative Club, Aberbargoed
- Balfour Street, Jerusalem
- Lord Arthur James Balfour Street, Ashdod
- Lord Arthur James Balfour Street, Tel Aviv

== Anthony Eden ==
- Anthony Eden hat
- Eden Court, Leamington Spa
- Sir Anthony Eden Way, Warwick

== Tony Blair ==
- Tonibler
- Blairism
- Blatcherism
- Tony Blair Institute for Global Change
- Tony Blair Faith Foundation
- Tony Blair Associates
- Bush–Blair 2003 Iraq memo
- Blair Babes
- Blair–Brown deal
- Tony's Cronies

== Gordon Brown ==
- Brownism
- Blair–Brown deal
- Brown Bottom

== Boris Johnson ==
- Boris Bikes
- Boris Bus, for the New Routemaster.
- Boris Island, for London Britannia Airport
- Boris Bridge, for the Irish Sea Bridge.
- Boris Johnson Street, Fontanka, Ukraine.
- The Boriswave

== Liz Truss ==
- Trussonomics

== Keir Starmer ==
- Starmerism
