= Ramani (surname) =

Ramani (Hindi: रमानी) is a surname. Notable people with the surname include:

- Balabhadrapatruni Ramani (1965), Indian litterateur, novelist, playwright, screenwriter, dialogue writer, and film critic
- Giuseppe Ramani (1922–1973), Italian rower
- K. Ramani (1916–2006), Indian politician
- P. S. Ramani (1938), Indian neurosurgeon and writer
- Priya Ramani, Indian journalist, writer, and editor
- Radhakrishna Ramani (1901–1970), Malaysian lawyer
- Raja V. Ramani, Indian-American scientist
- Roja Ramani (born 1959), Indian actress
- Sheila Ramani (1932–2015), Indian film actress
