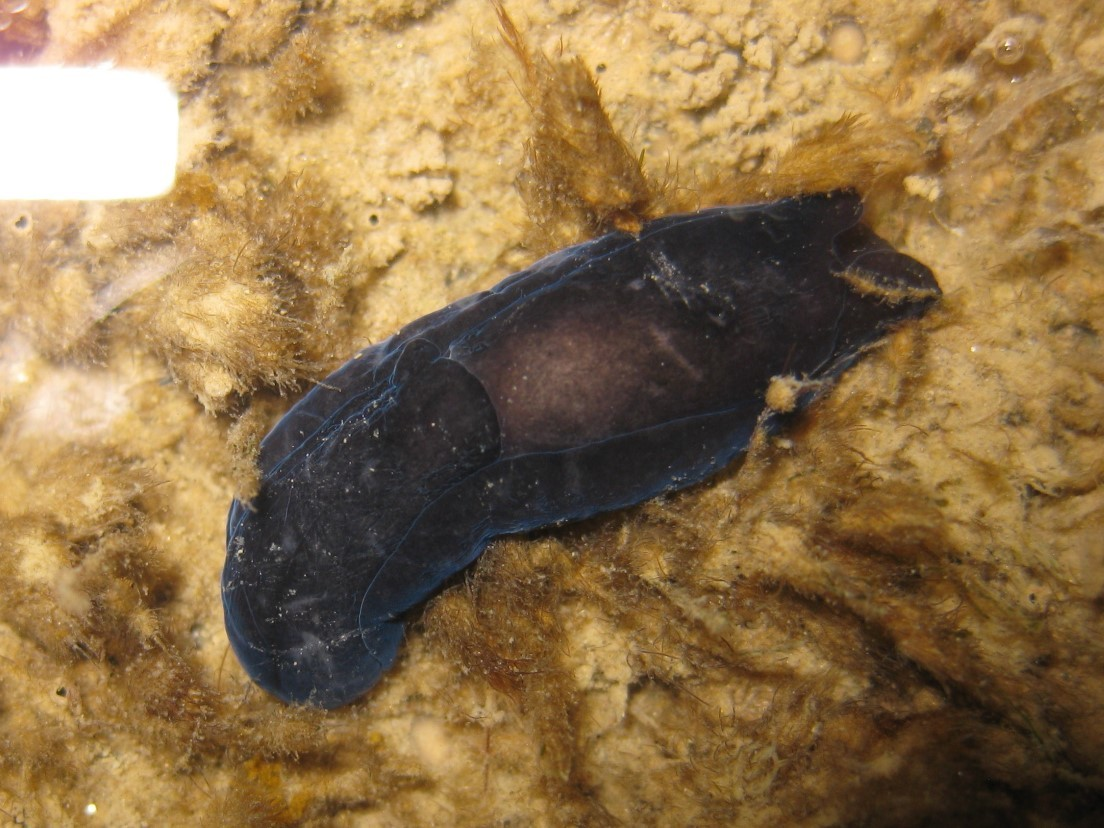
- In Pahurehure Inlet near Auckland

Scientific classification
- Domain: Eukaryota
- Kingdom: Animalia
- Phylum: Mollusca
- Class: Gastropoda
- Order: Cephalaspidea
- Family: Aglajidae
- Genus: Melanochlamys
- Species: M. cylindrica

Binomial name
- Melanochlamys cylindrica Thomas Cheeseman, 1881

= Melanochlamys cylindrica =

Species of gastropod

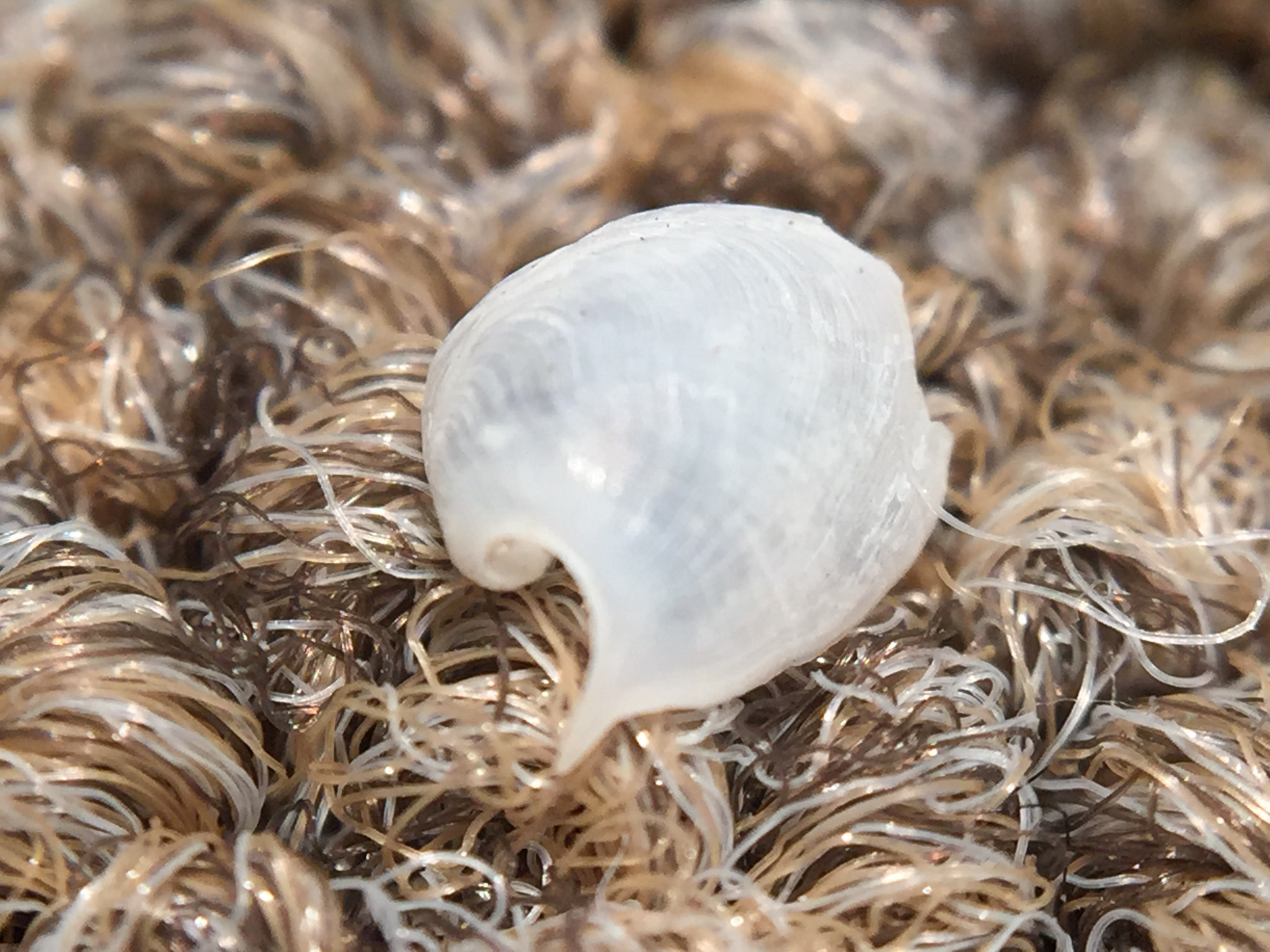
The internal shell structure

Melanochlamys cylindrica is a species of bubble snail in the family Aglajidae. It is endemic to New Zealand.

== Distribution and habitat ==
M. cylindrica is found on the coast of New Zealand's North and South Islands. It is absent from the Three Kings Islands/Manawatāwhi due to a lack of suitable habitat.

== Description ==
Adults are between 15 and 25 mm in length but may reach a maximum size of 30 mm. Body is long and cylindrical in shape with a uniformly black colour that may feature an iridescent blue sheen. The head shield is rounded with an indentation that may resemble two 'tails'. The parapodia are small and held tightly against sides of body. A large muscular mouth part (known as the buccal bulb) is contained in the anterior half of the body cavity.

=== Shell ===
This species has a smaller than usual internal shell that is 6 mm long and 5 mm wide. The shell is ear-shaped without formed whorls. It is heavily calcified and contained within the posterior part of the body.

== Behaviour and diet ==
M. cylindrica is most commonly found in the mid-intertidal zone in algal turf and on rock platforms. It may also be found down in shallow sub-tidal area.

It feeds on polychaete worms including bristle worms and round worms by "rapidly sucking them in like a piece of spaghetti" which are then broken apart by a muscular gizzard.
