= Rueso railway station =

Railway station in Rueso, Thailand

Rueso รือเสาะ
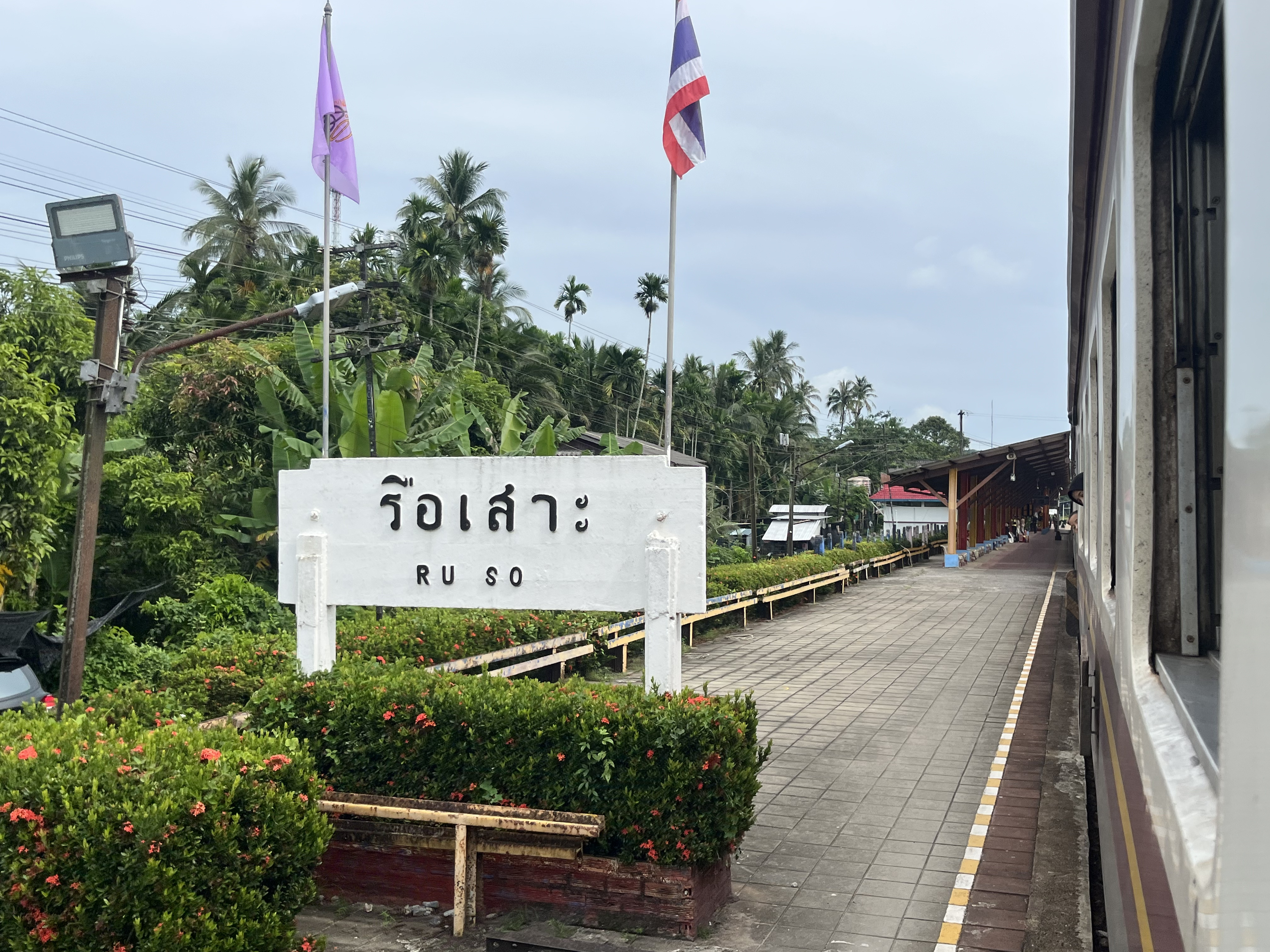

General information
- Location: Rueso Subdistrict, Rueso District, Yala
- Coordinates: 6.3939°N 101.5153°E
- Owner: State Railway of Thailand
- Line: Southern Line
- Platforms: 2
- Tracks: 3

Other information
- Station code: สะ.

Services
Preceding station	State Railway of Thailand	Following station
Balo towards Hua Lamphong or Krung Thep Aphiwat	Southern Line	Ban Salo Bukit Yuaerae Halt towards Su-ngai Kolok
Location

Rueso railway station is a railway station located in Rueso Subdistrict, Rueso District, Narathiwat. It is a class 1 railway station located 1,071.191 km (665.6 mi) from Thon Buri railway station.

== Incidents ==
- On 18 November 2012, a 100 kg bomb exploded under Local No. 463 Yala-Sungai Kolok. The bomb was planted under the railway tracks at the 1075 km post, between Rueso Railway Station and Ban Salo Bukit Yuaerae Halt. The bombing occurred at around 07:00 a.m., and caused one fatality (military volunteer) and 16 to be seriously injured. Carriage 7 (which was a guard's carriage) was destroyed to the largest extent from the impact of the bomb. The bomb crater was found 200 metres from Carriage 8 (the last carriage) and was three metres wide and 1.5 metres deep. Casualties were sent to Narathiwat Rajanagarindra Hospital afterwards.
- On 8 March 2015, a bomb hidden in a motorcycle exploded in front of Rueso Railway Station. The bombing occurred at about 08:00 a.m., and caused nine casualties, of which were three soldiers and six locals. The casualties were sent to Rueso Hospital, Narathwiat Rajanagarindra Hospital and Yala Central Hospital afterwards. The motorcycle used was stolen from a deceased school teacher in Cho-airong District, and the registration plate was stolen from a local in Sukhirin District.

All events were part of the South Thailand Insurgency.

== Services ==
- Super Express No. 37/38 Bangkok-Sungai Kolok-Bangkok
- Rapid No. 171/172 Bangkok-Sungai Kolok-Bangkok
- Rapid No. 175/176 Hat Yai Junction-Sungai Kolok-Hat Yai Junction
- Local No. 447/448 Surat Thani-Sungai Kolok-Surat Thani
- Local No. 451/452 Nakhon Si Thammarat-Sungai Kolok-Nakhon Si Thammarat
- Local No. 453/454 Yala-Sungai Kolok-Yala
- Local No. 463/464 Phatthalung-Sungai Kolok-Phatthalung
