= Charles Powell, Baron Powell of Bayswater =

British diplomat and businessman

The Right Honourable The Lord Powell of Bayswater KCMG
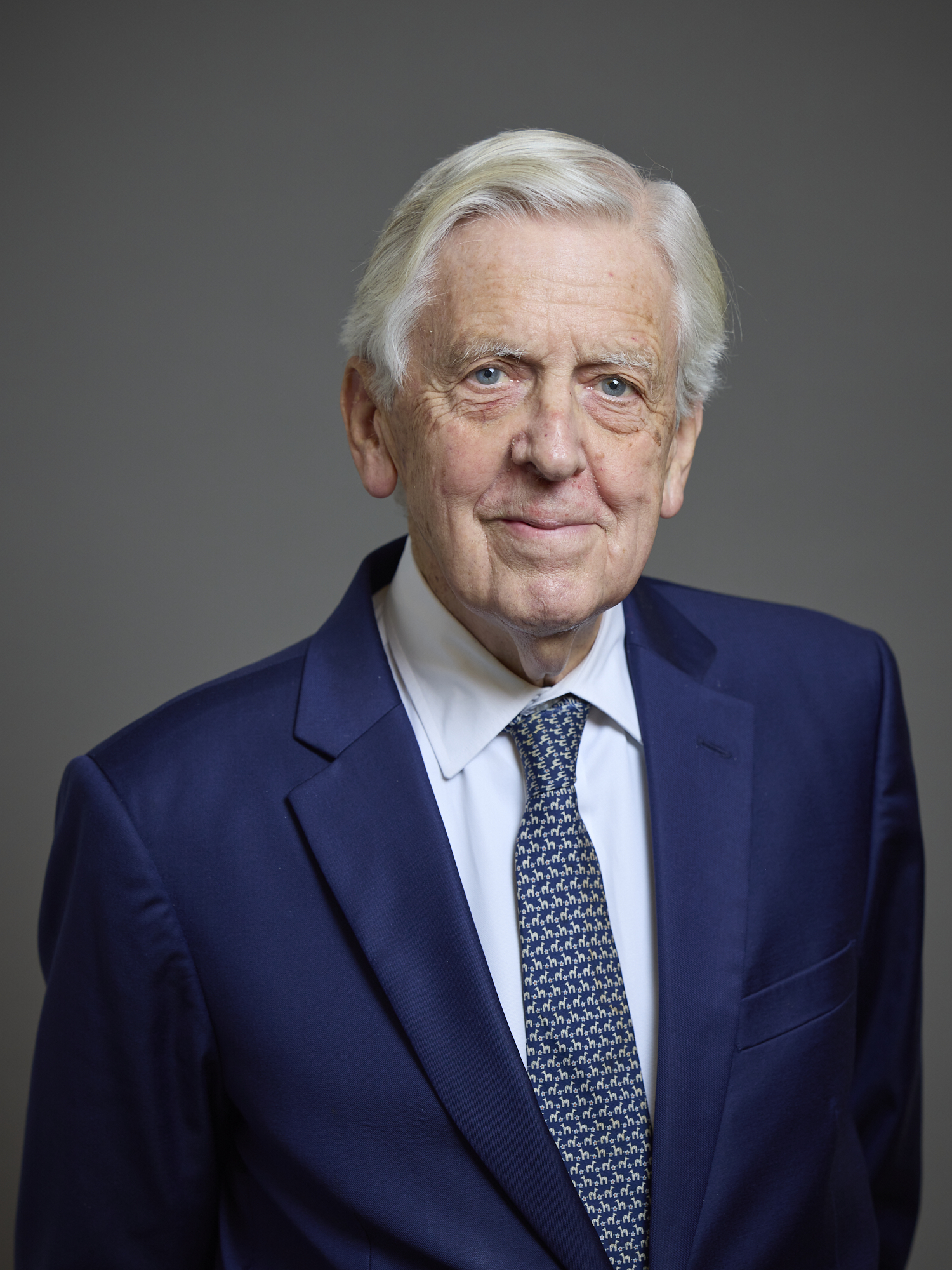
- Official portrait, 2025

Private Secretary for Foreign Affairs to the Prime Minister
- In office 1983–1991
- Prime Minister: Margaret Thatcher; John Major
- Preceded by: John Coles
- Succeeded by: Stephen Wall

Member of the House of Lords
- Lord Temporal
- Life peerage 15 February 2000

Personal details
- Born: Charles David Powell; 6 July 1941 (age 85)
- Party: Crossbench
- Spouse: Carla Bonardi (m. 1964)
- Children: 2
- Education: New College, Oxford

Charles David Powell, Baron Powell of Bayswater, KCMG (/poʊl/, pronounced 'pole'; born 6 July 1941) is a British diplomat and businessman who served as a key foreign policy adviser to Prime Minister Margaret Thatcher during the 1980s.

== Early life and education ==
Son of Air Vice-Marshal John Frederick Powell and his wife Ysolda, Powell was educated at the Cathedral Choir School, Canterbury; The King's School, Canterbury; and New College, Oxford, graduating BA in 1963 with first class honours in Modern History. One brother, Sir Chris Powell, is an advertiser; another, Jonathan, was chief of staff to Prime Minister Tony Blair.

== Career ==
=== Diplomatic ===
Charles Powell joined His Majesty's Diplomatic Service in 1963. His first posting was as Third Secretary to Helsinki in 1965, where he was promoted to Second Secretary. In 1968, he returned to London, spending three years at the FCO. He was posted as First Secretary to Washington, D.C. in 1971, as the Ambassador's Private Secretary. Subsequent postings were to Bonn in 1974 and, as Counsellor, to UKREP Brussels in 1980. He was seconded to 10 Downing Street and served as Private Secretary to Margaret Thatcher (1983 to 1990) and then as Private Secretary to John Major (1990 to 1991). During his time working for Mrs Thatcher, he became one of her most trusted foreign policy aides.

=== Business ===
Since 1992 Powell has served on the boards of Jardine Matheson Holdings Ltd, LVMH Moet-Hennessy Louis Vuitton, Caterpillar Inc., Textron Corporation, Mandarin Oriental International Ltd, Hongkong Land Ltd and Schindler Holding Ltd. He chaired the international advisory board of Rolls-Royce and is a member of the advisory boards of Barrick Gold, Chubb Insurance and Thales, and a strategic adviser to BAE Systems and an adviser to Bowmark Private Equity. He was for ten years chairman of both the China-Britain Business Council and the Singapore British Business Council, as well as chairman of the British Government's Asia Task Force.

== House of Lords ==
He currently sits as a crossbench life peer in the House of Lords. He is currently a member of the Joint Committee on the National Security Strategy.

== Charities ==
He is chairman of the British Museum Trust, chairman of the Trustees of the Said Business School at Oxford University, and trustee of the Said Foundation, the Margaret Thatcher Scholarships at Oxford, the Margaret Thatcher Archive Trust at Cambridge, chairman of the Atlantic Partnership and a member of King's College London Campaign Board.

== Personal life ==
He married Carla Bonardi in 1964. They have two sons, born in 1967 and 1968. One, Hugh, also joined the diplomatic service. Hugh also later became Deputy National Security Adviser, under David Cameron's coalition government, before later roles in geo-political risk in banking and as a partner at defense investment firm AE Blue Capital. Charles Powell's brother, Jonathan, is the current national security adviser.

He has three younger brothers, Chris (co-founder of DDB Advertising Agency, and currently chair of NESTA), Roderick (Rod), and Jonathan, the former Chief of Staff to Prime Minister Tony Blair, a member of the Labour Party.

Powell is an Honorary Fellow of the Ashmolean Museum in Oxford, a Foundation Fellow of Somerville College Oxford, and an Honorary Fellow of King's College, London, a visiting professor at St Mary's University and has an honorary DSc from Shiv Nadar University in India.

== Honours ==
- He was appointed Knight Commander of the Order of St Michael and St George (KCMG) in the Prime Minister's retirement honours list of December 1990.
- In 2001 he was awarded the Public Service Star by the government of Singapore.
- He was created a life peer in the 2000 New Year Honours as Baron Powell of Bayswater, of Canterbury in the County of Kent, being Gazetted on 15 February 2000.

== In the media ==
Powell has been interviewed for multiple documentaries about Margaret Thatcher and about foreign policy.

== In popular culture ==
Powell was portrayed by Terence Harvey in the 2004 BBC production of The Alan Clark Diaries, by James Fox in 2009's Margaret and by Dominic Rowan in Netflix's The Crown.

== Arms ==
Coat of arms of Charles Powell, Baron Powell of Bayswater
Crest With a chapeau Gules charged with three bezants turned up Argent plumed on the sinister side with a swan's wing Or a ruined square based tower of the Roman campagna also Or. Escutcheon Quarterly Argent and Or on a chevron throughout Vert between three fleurs de lys Gules three mural crowns Or on a chief Azure three pigs passant Or winged Argent. Supporters On either side a lion Or that on the dexter supporting with the exterior foreclaws a shaft of palewise Argent entwined with oak leaves slipped Vert fructed Or and terminating in base a pheon reversed Argent and that on the sinister holding with the exterior foreclaws a lily slipped and leaved Proper. Motto Pedibus Stantibus

Orders of precedence in the United Kingdom
Preceded by The Lord Birt	Life Peer; Baron Powell of Bayswater	Followed by The Lord Oakeshott of Seagrove Bay
