= Ar-Rahman (disambiguation) =

Ar-Rahman is the 55th chapter (surah) of the Qur'an.

Ar-Rahman, Al-Rahman, or other forms may also refer to:

== Mosques ==
- Ar-Rahman Mosque (Aleppo), Syria
- Al-Rahman Mosque, Baghdad, Iraq
- Ar-Rahman Mosque (Pyongyang), North Korea
- Al-Rahman Mosque, Kuala Lumpur, Malaysia
- Ar-Rahma Mosque, Kyiv, Ukraine
- Al-Rahma Mosque, Liverpool, United Kingdom

== People ==
- A. R. Rahman (born 1967), Oscar Award-winning Indian music composer, singer, and songwriter

== Other ==
- Al-Rahman Legion, or al-Rahman Corps, an Islamist Syrian rebel group

== See also ==
- Rahman (name)
- Rahman (disambiguation)
