= Balo railway station =

Railway station in Yala, Thailand

Balo บาลอ
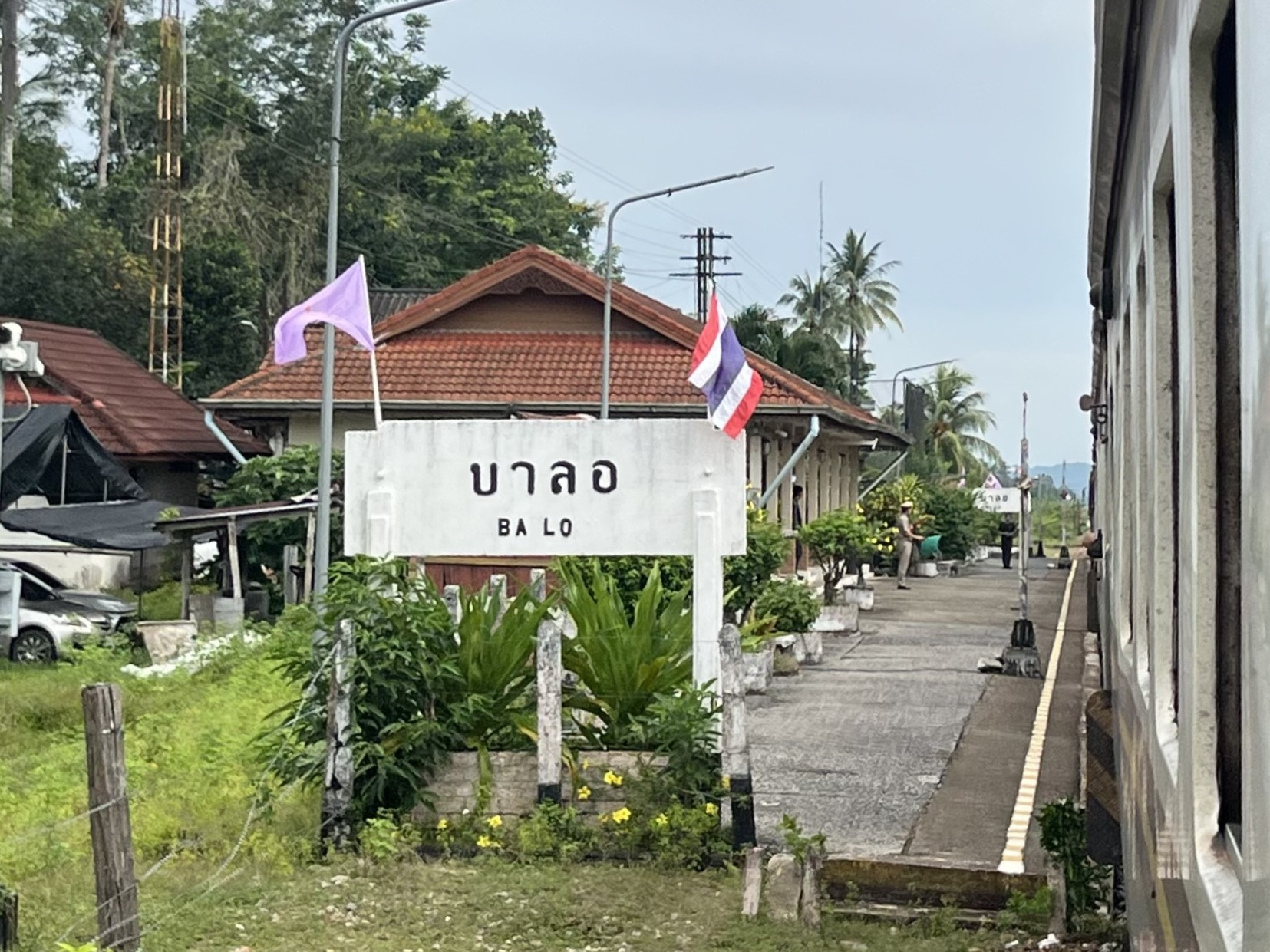

General information
- Location: Balo Subdistrict, Raman District, Yala; Thailand
- Coordinates: 6.4413°N 101.4576°E
- Owner: State Railway of Thailand
- Line: Southern Line
- Platforms: 1
- Tracks: 2

Other information
- Station code: าล.

Services
Preceding station	State Railway of Thailand	Following station
Raman towards Hua Lamphong or Krung Thep Aphiwat	Southern Line	Rueso towards Su-ngai Kolok
Location

Balo railway station (Thai: สถานีบาลอ) is a railway station located in Balo Subdistrict, Raman District, Yala, Thailand. It is a class 3 railway station located 1,061.706 km (659.7 mi) from Thon Buri Railway Station.

== Services ==
- Local No. 447/448 Surat Thani-Sungai Kolok-Surat Thani
- Local No. 451/452 Nakhon Si Thammarat-Sungai Kolok-Nakhon Si Thammarat
- Local No. 453/454 Yala-Sungai Kolok-Yala
- Local No. 463/464 Phatthalung-Sungai Kolok-Phatthalung
