= BSNL Sports Quiz =

BSNL Sports Quiz is a weekly television phone-in quiz program in India, running continuously since 2002. Since its inception to early 2019, the program's episodes were hosted/anchored by Dr. Sumanth C. Raman who was also its main ideator. In September 2017, the program completed 800 weekly episodes, continuing to be India's longest running quiz program. Now BSNL Sports Quiz is telecast on Sunday nights on the DD Podhigai satellite channel. The programme is branded and sponsored by Bharat Sanchar Nigam Limited (BSNL) Tamil Nadu Circle, with weekly prizes also given by BSNL. The program takes calls from contestants via SMS, e-mail, Skype and mobile phone. On 24 February 2019 Sumanth Raman was replaced by L.Srirama Narayanan as the host for the show.
