= Chris Powell (advertiser) =

British advertiser (born 1943)

Sir John Christopher Powell (born 4 October 1943) is a British advertiser. He is the son of Air Vice-Marshal John Frederick Powell, OBE.

== Advertiser ==
Powell joined the advertising agency Boase Massimi Pollitt (BMP) in 1969, was appointed to the board in 1972 and made managing director three years later. Rhys Williams wrote in 1999 "He is one of the most respected practitioners of his trade".

An early campaign created by BMP while under Powell's management was for the Smash potato brand, featuring potato-loving Martians; this advertisement was voted Britain's favourite at the time. In 1983 BMP floated on the London Stock Exchange valued at £16 million. After a hostile bid by a French company, BMP was bought in 1989 for £125 million ($200 million) by DDB Worldwide, part of Omnicom Group, a US holding company controlling many agencies.

Powell later became BMP DDB's CEO, and subsequently chairman.

Powell was knighted for services to the advertising industry at the end of 2008. BMP DDB was the Labour Party's advertising agency from 1972 to 1997.

== Commerce ==
Powell was Chair of NESTA from 2003 to 2010, and was chair of the Institute of Public Policy Research think tank; the British Council's Creative Industries Advisory Panel; the Ealing Hammersmith and Hounslow Health Authority; and Vice Chair of the Public Diplomacy Board. He serves on the Government's Science Forum and the Board of Riverside Studios.

He is a member of the Corporate Finance Advisory Board at Pricewaterhouse Coopers, advising on corporate finance in the entertainment and media sector, and has NED roles at Dr Foster, Renew, ParcelGenie.com, and UBM.

== Personal life ==
He has three brothers, Charles, Roderick, and Jonathan Powell. Charles was Margaret Thatcher's private secretary for foreign affairs; Jonathan was chief of staff to Tony Blair.
