= John Frederick Powell =

Royal Air Force Air Vice Marshal

- Born: 12 June 1915; Somerset, England
- Died: 24 November 2008 (aged 93)
- Military career
- Allegiance: United Kingdom
- Branch: Royal Air Force
- Service years: 1939–1972
- Rank: Air Vice Marshal
- Conflicts: Second World War
- Awards: Officer of the Order of the British Empire; Mentioned in Despatches

Air Vice Marshal John Frederick Powell, OBE (12 June 1915 – 24 November 2008) was a long-serving officer at RAF College Cranwell.

== RAF career ==
Powell was born in Somerset, and was educated at King's College School, Cambridge, Lancing College and King's College, Cambridge. He was commissioned into the special duties branch of the Royal Air Force Volunteer Reserve in 1939 and spent the Second World War with RAF Coastal Command in the operations room at RAF Aldergrove (1939–1945). He flew on operational sorties against U-boats and was mentioned in despatches.

After spells spent with the Air Ministry and the Ministry of Defence, Powell was appointed Command Education Officer, Bomber Command Headquarters (1964–1966) and then Officer Commanding RAF School of Education (1966–1967). He was elevated to the rank of air vice marshal in 1967 upon being appointed Director of Education Services, RAF. He was appointed an Officer of the Order of the British Empire in 1956.

== Personal life ==
Powell married (Geraldine) Ysolda Moylan in 1939, and the couple had four sons:

- Charles Powell, Baron Powell of Bayswater (born 1941), advisor to Margaret Thatcher
- Sir Chris Powell (born 1943), who worked in advertising
- Roderick Powell (born 1948), an engineer and accountant who emigrated to the United States
- Jonathan Powell (born 1956), an advisor to Tony Blair

Powell died on 24 November 2008.
