= Arossim =

- Village
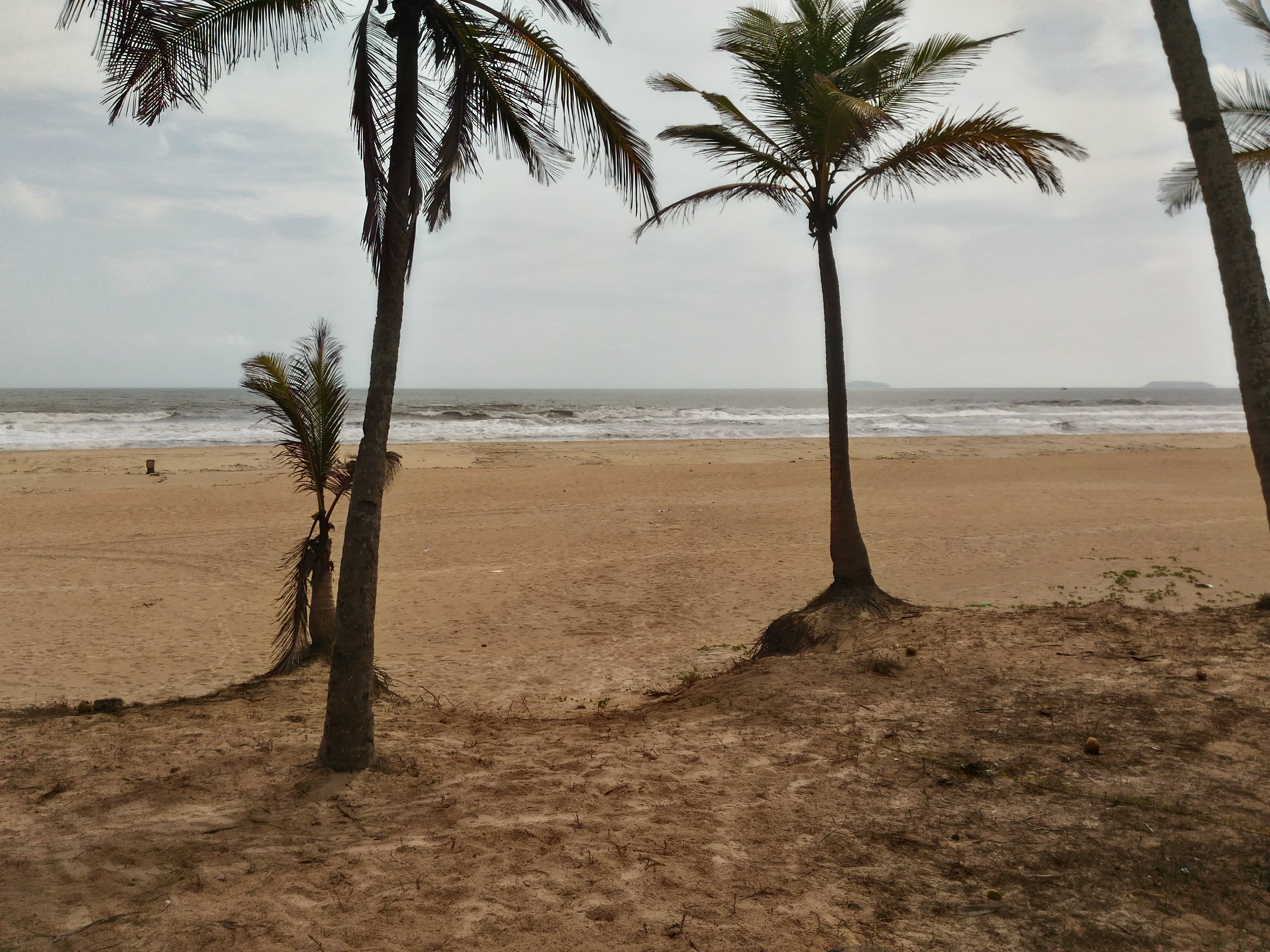

- Location in Goa, India Arossim (India)
- Coordinates: 15.3367°N 73.9008°E
- Country: India
- State: Goa
- District: South Goa

Government
  - Body: Panchayat

Population (2011)
  - Total: 1,721

Languages
  - Official: Konkani
- Time zone: UTC+5:30 (IST)
- PIN: 403712
- Vehicle registration: GA
- Website: goa.gov.in

Arossim ([saːɭɡãːw]) is a medium-sized village in South Goa district in the Indian state of Goa. It is surrounded by the villages of Cansaulim to the north, Utorda and Majorda to the south, Verna and Nuvem to the east, and the Arabian Sea to the west. It is 14.7 km from Margao, the main headquarters town of South Goa district and 27.5 km from Panjim or Panaji, the state capital of Goa.

In recent times, Arossim has been known for its prominence in tourism, with large and small hotels and eateries in the area, besides its traditional beach.
