= List of eponymous roads in Mumbai =

List of roads in Mumbai named after people

This is a list of roads in Mumbai named after people.

| Road | Named after | Location | Notes |
|---|---|---|---|
| Shahid Bhagat Singh Marg | Bhagat Singh | South Mumbai | Formerly called Colaba Causeway. |
| Bhulabhai Desai Road | Bhulabhai Desai | South Mumbai | Indian independence activist. Formerly called Warden Road. |
| Dr. Gopalrao Deshmukh Marg | Gopalrao Deshmukh | South Mumbai | Formerly called Pedder Road, after M.G. Pedder, municipal commissioner in 1879. |
| Dr. Dadasaheb Bhadkamkar Marg | Dadasaheb Bhadkamkar | South Mumbai | Formerly called Lamington Road, after Lord Lamington, the Governor of Bombay between 1903 and 1907. |
| Dr. Kashibai Navrange Marg | Kashibai Navrange | South Mumbai | Formerly called Alexandra Road. |
| Lady Jamshetjee Road | Avabai Jamsetjee Jeejeebhoy | South Mumbai | Wife of Sir Jamsetjee Jejeebhoy. |
| Lal Bahadur Shastri Marg | Lal Bahadur Shastri | Eastern Suburbs | 2nd Prime Minister of India. |
| Capt. Prakash Pethe Marg | Capt. Prakash Pethe | South Mumbai | Cuffe Parade Road was named after Captain Prakash Pethe of the Indian Army 3 Para (SF) Parachute Regiment (Service No. IC19847) who died in 1971 |
| M.L. Dahanukar Marg | M.L. Dahanukar | South Mumbai | Formerly called Carmichael Road. |
| Mohammad Ali Road | Disputed | South Mumbai | The road is either named for 19th-century philanthropist Mohammed Ali Roghe or Khilafat Movement leader Mohammad Ali Jauhar. |
| N.S. Patkar Marg | N.S. Patkar | South Mumbai | Formerly called Hughes Road. |
| Nepean Sea Road | Evan Nepean | Malabar Hill | Governor of Bombay (1812–1819) |
| Ramdas Nayak Road | Ramdas Nayak | Bandra (West) | MLA for Bandra. |
| Pandita Ramabai Marg | Ramabai Saraswati | Gamdevi | Social reformer. |
| Rajiv Gandhi Sea Link | Rajiv Gandhi | Bandra-Worli | Commonly known as the Bandra–Worli Sea Link. |
| Rustom Sidhwa Marg | Rustom K. Sidhwa | South Mumbai | Member of the Constituent Assembly and 1st Lok Sabha. Formerly named Gunbow Street by the British, after businessman and moneylender Ganba Shet, a grandfather of social reformer of Jaganath Shunkerseth. |
| S.K. Barodawallah Marg | S.K. Barodawallah | South Mumbai | Formerly called Altamount Road. |
| Samaldas Gandhi Marg | Samaldas Gandhi | South Mumbai | Indian independence activist. Formerly called Princess Street. |
| Netaji Subhash Chandra Bose Road | Subhash Chandra Bose | South Mumbai | Indian nationalist. Commonly known as Marine Drive. |
| Swami Vivekanand Road | Swami Vivekananda | Western Suburbs | |
| Vitthalbhai Patel Road | Vithalbhai Patel | Girgaon | Co-founder of the Swaraj Party. |
| Shankarsheth Road | Jagannath Shankarseth | Girgaon | An Indian philanthropist and educationalist. |
| Jangali Maharaj Road | Jangali Maharaj | Mahim | An Indian saint. |
| J. N. Heredia Marg | J. N. Heredia | Ballard Estate | Indian diplomat |
