= Radha Raman =

Radha Raman may refer to:

- Radha Ramana (or Radharaman), a famous image of Radha Krishna worshiped in Hinduism
- Radharaman Dutta (1833-1915), Sylheti folk music composer and founder of the dhamail dance tradition
- Radha Raman (politician), Former member of Lok Sabha.
