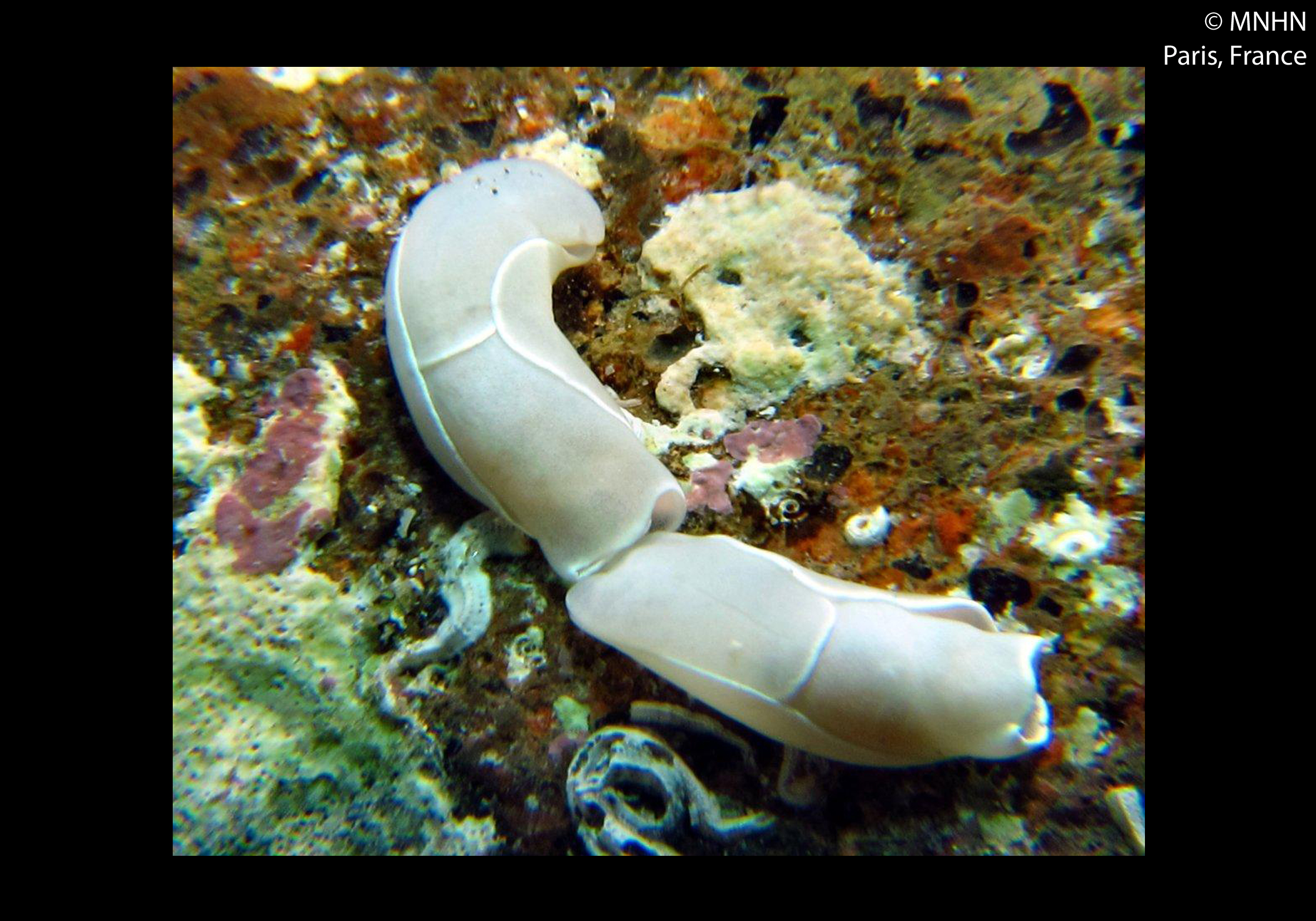
- Holotype of Melanochlamys miqueli at MNHN, Paris

Scientific classification
- Kingdom: Animalia
- Phylum: Mollusca
- Class: Gastropoda
- Order: Cephalaspidea
- Superfamily: Philinoidea
- Family: Aglajidae
- Genus: Melanochlamys; Cheeseman, 1881

Type species
- Melanochlamys cylindrica Cheeseman, 1881

Synonyms
- Nona H. Adams & A. Adams, 1854 (nomen oblitum); Smaragdinella (Nona) H. Adams & A. Adams, 1854

= Melanochlamys =

Genus of gastropods

Melanochlamys is a genus of headshield slugs in the family Aglajidae. Despite the appearance of its species, this genus must not be confused with nudibranchs.

This genus was first described by Cheeseman in 1881 but later malacologists considered it a junior synonym of Aglaja Renier, 1807, until the genus was reinstated by Rudman in 1972.

It differs from the other genera in Aglajidae by its external cylindrical body form with small parapodia, the shape of its small, curved and strongly calcified shell, its alimentary canal with a rigid, non-eversible buccal bulb, and the reproductive system with a short duct to the exogenous ( = originating from the outside) sperm sac and a characteristic penis.

== Species ==
According to the World Register of Marine Species (WoRMS), this genus contains the following accepted names:

- Melanochlamys algirae (Adams A. in Sowerby G.B. II, 1850)
- Melanochlamys aquilina S.-Q. Zhang, M.-J. Liao, Y.-G. Wang, M. Kong & B. Li, 2020
- Melanochlamys barryi Gosliner, 1990
- Melanochlamys bengalensis Tudu, Sajan & Mukhopadhyay, 2022
- Melanochlamys chabanae Breslau, Valdés & Chichvarkhin, 2016
- Melanochlamys cylindrica Cheeseman, 1881
- Melanochlamys diomedea (Bergh, 1893)
- Melanochlamys droupadi Tudu & Sajan, 2024
- Melanochlamys ezoensis (Baba, 1957)
- Melanochlamys fukudai Cooke, Hanson, Hirano, Ornelas-Gatdula, Gosliner, Chernyshev & Valdés, 2014
- Melanochlamys handrecki Burn, 2010
- Melanochlamys kohi Cooke, Hanson, Hirano, Ornelas-Gatdula, Gosliner, Chernyshev & Valdés, 2014
- Melanochlamys lorrainae (Rudman, 1968)
- Melanochlamys maderensis (Watson, 1897)
- Melanochlamys miqueli (Pelorce, Horst & Hoarau, 2013)
- Melanochlamys papillata Gosliner, 1990
- Melanochlamys queritor (Burn, 1957)
- †Melanochlamys radwanskii (Bałuk, 2018)

Species brought into synonymy

- Melanochlamys depicta (Renier, 1807): synonym of Philinopsis depicta (Renier, 1807)
- Melanochlamys dubia (O'Donoghue, 1929): synonym of Philinopsis dubia (O'Donoghue, 1929)
- †Melanochlamys jolkii (Anistratenko & Prisyazhnyuk, 1996): synonym of †Chelidonura jolkii (Anistratenko & Prisyazhnyuk, 1996)
- Melanochlamys nana (Steinberg & Jones, 1960): synonym of Melanochlamys diomedea (Bergh, 1894)
- Melanochlamys seurati (Vayssière, 1926): synonym of Melanochlamys algirae (Adams A. in Sowerby G.B. II, 1850)
- Melanochlamys virgo (Rudman, 1968): synonym of Philinopsis virgo (Rudman, 1968)
- Melanochlamys wildpretii Ortea, Bacallado & Moro, 2003: synonym of Spinoaglaja wildpretii (Ortea, Bacallado & Moro, 2003)
