= Sumanth C. Raman =

Tamil TV anchor and Sports commentator

Sumanth Raman
- Occupations: Sports commentator, TV Anchor, Doctor
- Years active: 1995-present
- Spouse: Anita Sumanth

Sumanth C. Raman is an Indian right-wing social media influencer, television anchor and sports commentator. He was the host of BSNL Sports Quiz on Doordarshan's Podhigai TV channel. His wife Anita Sumanth, is a judge in the Madras High Court.

== Education ==
Raman holds a Diploma in Child Health and an MD in General Medicine. He also holds a Diploma in Computer applications.

== Career ==
Dr Raman's BSNL Sports Quiz is in the Limca Book of Records for being the longest running weekly quiz show on Indian television Previously, he was the anchor of All Out for No Loss! on STAR Vijay

As a sports commentator, he has hosted over 2000 sports programs, including the Asia Cup Hockey Tournament (2007), the Twenty20 Cricket World Cup in Tamil for ESPN Star Sports (2007), and the World Team Squash Championships (2007). He also provided commentary for the Squash World Cup of 2011 He frequently appears as a featured sports analyst on Puthiya Thalaimurai, Dinathanthi etc.

Aside from Sports, he also does live coverage of current affairs. In 2009, he was involved with the analyses and debate over the Lok Sabha Polls for Zee Tamil, the Tamil Nadu Assembly Elections 2011 on DD Podhigai, Pre Poll Debates and Analysis on Zee Tamil in 2011 and election-day live coverage on DD Podhigai. He has hosted political debate shows, including Makkal Theerpu and Nattu Nadappu (both for Win TV) and Tamizha Tamizha on STAR Vijay.

He frequents as a political analyst and guest speaker for Headlines Today, NewsX, Republic and Times Now.

As a documentary filmmaker, he has been involved with the making of over 200 television documentaries, including "Power of the Ballot" in 1996, for which he won a National Award for Best Anchor, awarded by the UGC. He was also the winner of the Sony-ICD Video Award for the best film in the South and South East Asian category for These Leaves Never Wither

He has also been a senior anchor at State functions. Since 1993, he has been compering the State Independence Day and Republic Day celebrations in Chennai. In 2012, he also anchored the Diamond Jubilee celebrations of the Tamil Nadu State Legislative Assembly and the Sesquicentennial Celebrations of the Madras High Court. He has also compered the Inaugural Function of the World Tamil Conference in 2010 and the '100 Years of Indian Cinema' state celebrations in 2013.

He is a regular contributor to print media, and his work appears in The Economic Times, India Today and The Hindu

In 2019, Dr Raman announced that he was kicked out from hosting BSNL Sports Quiz anymore due to his political views being 'unpalatable to a certain political party. Sumanth wrote, “Over the last 3-4 years there have been multiple and repeated attempts made by those affiliated to or supporters of the BJP to oust me from the program because of me airing my political views on national and regional channels.”

== Notable Media Appearances ==
Title	Year	Type	Channel
Power of the Ballot	1995	Documentary	DD Podhigai
These Leaves Never Wither	1998	Documentary	DD Podhigai
Asianet Poll-98	1998	Live News	Asianet
All Out For No Loss!	1999-2000	Quiz	STAR Vijay
Tamizha Tamizha	2001	Magazine Program	STAR Vijay
Hallo Ungaludan	1998-2001	Talk Show	DD Podhigai
Lok Sabha Elections 2005	2005	Live news	Win TV
Nattu Nadappu	2004-2005	Talk Show	Win TV
BSNL Sports Quiz	2002 – 2019	Quiz	DD Podhigai
Lok Sabha Elections 2009	2009	Live News	Zee Tamil
Documentary on Kancheepuram Silk	2010	Documentary	DD Podhigai
Tamil Nadu Assembly Elections 2011	2011	Live News	Zee Tamil
Tamil Nadu Assembly Elections 2011-Counting Day	2011	Live News	DD Podhigai
Makkal Theerpu	2011	Talk Show	Makkal TV
Madras and the Freedom Movement	2011	Documentary	DD Podhigai
The Vanishing Sparrow	2013	Documentary	DD Podhigai
Puthia Pathai Puthia Payanam (feature on the Chennai Metro Rail)	2013	Documentary	DD Podhigai
Documentary on AIR Chennai for Platinum Jubilee Celebrations	2013	Documentary	All India Radio Chennai
Prof. K.R. Sundararajan Centenary Inter College Quiz Competition	2014	Quiz	DD Podhigai
Janavani Election Special	2014	Debate program	DD Podhigai
Achu Alasal	2015–Present	Current Affairs	Thanthi TV
Thamizhagathin Mastermind	2015–present	Quiz show	All India Radio FM Rainbow
