= Ramen (disambiguation) =

Ramen is a Japanese dish of noodles in broth.

Ramen may also refer to:

- Instant noodles, sometimes described as ramen.
- Lake Rämen, a lake in Dalarna, Sweden
- R'amen, a word used at the end of prayers in parody religion Pastafarianism
- Ramen, fictional characters in The Chronicles of Thomas Covenant by Stephen R. Donaldson
- Ramen Deka, Indian politician

== See also ==
- Raman (disambiguation)
- Rahman (name)
