= Raman railway station =

Railway station in Raman, Thailand

Raman รามัน
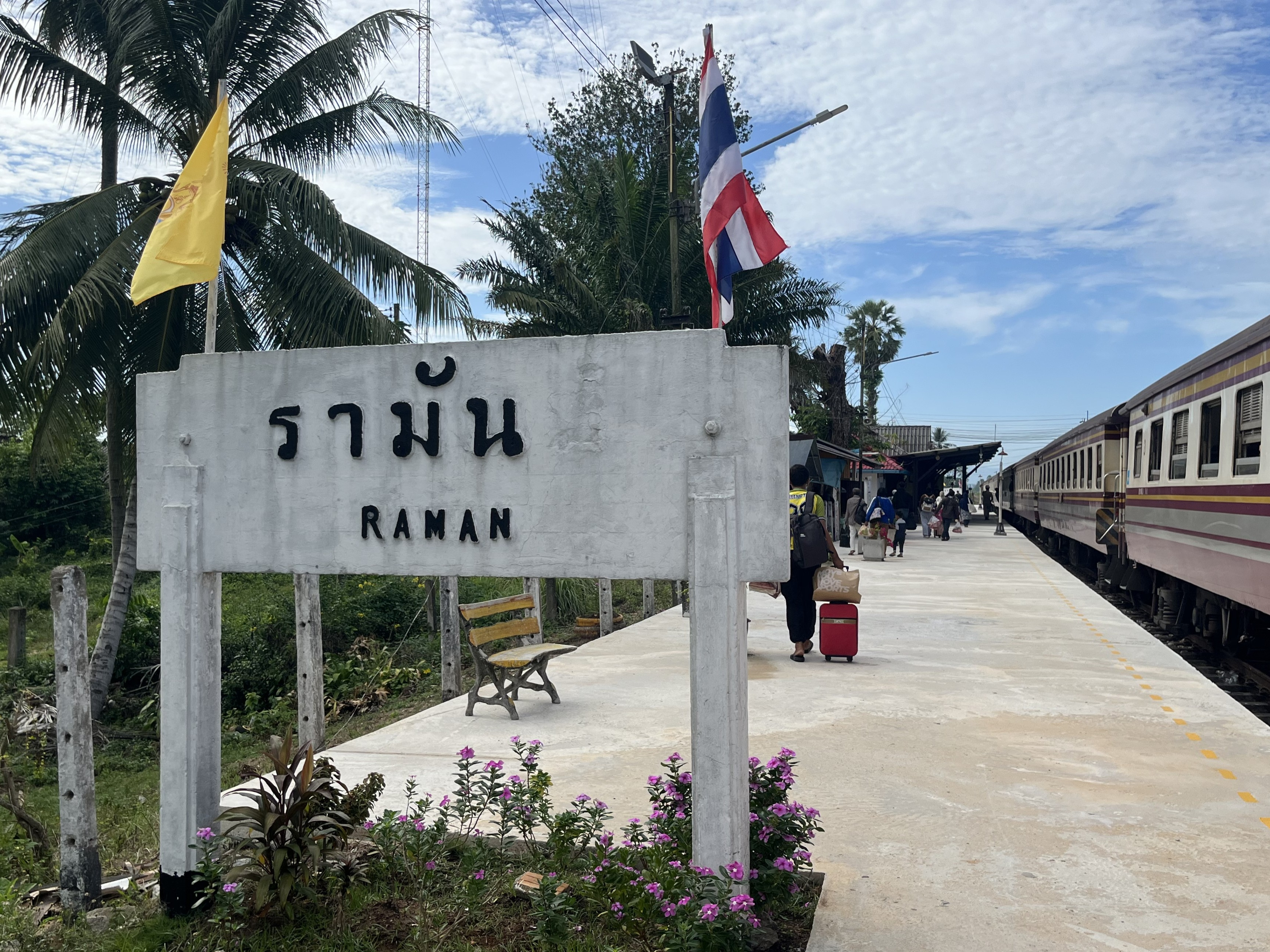

General information
- Location: National Highway No. 4066, Kayu Boko Subdistrict, Raman District, Yala
- Coordinates: 6.4770°N 101.4319°E
- Owner: State Railway of Thailand
- Line: Southern Line
- Platforms: 2
- Tracks: 2

Other information
- Station code: รั.

History
- Former names: Kabu

Services
Preceding station	State Railway of Thailand	Following station
Ban Patae Halt towards Hua Lamphong or Krung Thep Aphiwat	Southern Line	Balo towards Su-ngai Kolok
Location

Raman railway station is a railway station located in Kayu Boko Subdistrict, Raman District, Yala, Thailand. It is a class 1 railway station located 1,056.824 km (656.7 mi) from Thon Buri railway station.

== Bombings ==
On 2 October 2010, a 10 kg bomb hidden in a motorcycle blew up in front of Raman railway station. As a result, four people were injured all together, with two policemen seriously injured. Victims were sent to Raman Hospital and Yala Central Hospital afterward. The event was part of the South Thailand insurgency.

== Services ==
- Rapid No. 171/172 Bangkok-Sungai Kolok-Bangkok.
- Rapid No. 175/176 Hat Yai Junction-Sungai Kolok-Hat Yai Junction.
- Local No. 447/448 Surat Thani-Sungai Kolok-Surat Thani.
- Local No. 451/452 Nakhon Si Thammarat-Sungai Kolok-Nakhon Si Thammarat.
- Local No. 453/454 Yala-Sungai Kolok-Yala.
- Local No. 463/464 Phatthalung-Sungai Kolok-Phatthalung.
