= Ramana, Pakistan =

Ramana
- Village
- Location within Pakistan
- Coordinates: 31.29°N 72.50°E
- Country: Pakistan
- Province: Punjab
- District: Chiniot
- Tehsil: Bhawana
- Time zone: UTC+5 (PST)

Ramana is a village of Bhawana Tehsil in Chiniot District of Punjab, Pakistan. It is located on Bhawana-Painsra road with a population of 4,000 (approximately).
