= Hughes Road =

Road in South Mumbai, India

Coordinates: 18.9603167°N 72.8076643°E

Hughes Road or N. S. Patkar Marg is an arterial road in South Mumbai linking Opera House with Kemps Corner. It is flanked by Hanging Gardens of Mumbai and the Towers of Silence on one side and the Porsche showroom, Augustus Villa 21 Hughes road, New Era School, RTI and Westside on the other. It is close to the Arabian Sea.

The road was named after Sir Walter Hughes, who served as the inaugural chairman of the Bombay Improvement Trust. The Trust was responsible for developing the New Gamdevi area as a model suburb when the arterial road was inaugurated in 1908. It was later renamed after N. S. Patkar.

== Future Development ==
Future projects include the creation of two towers that will be used for commercial and residential purposes.
