= Boriswave =

Post-Brexit surge of immigration

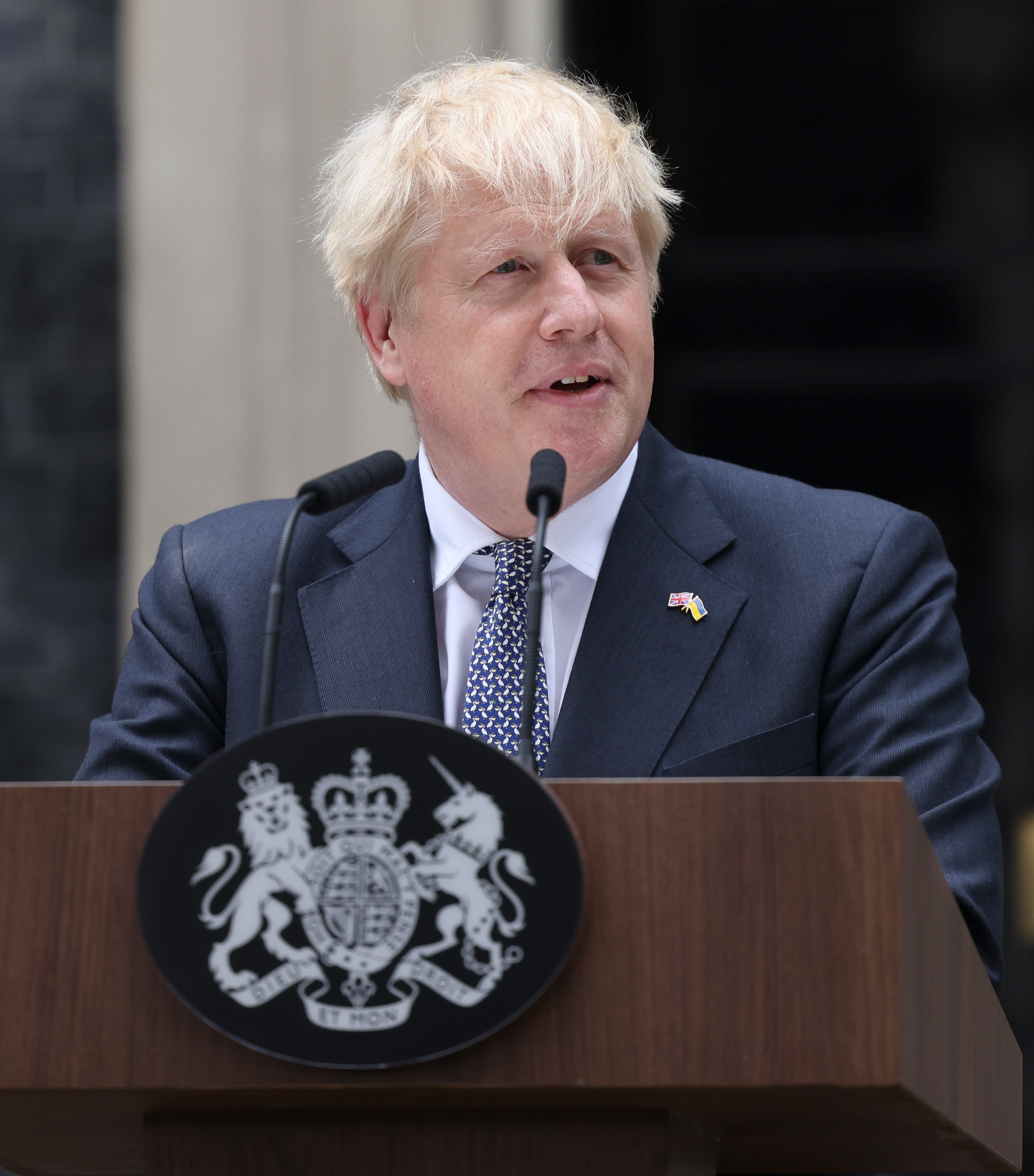
The surge in post-Brexit immigration (left) is named after the former British prime minister Boris Johnson (right).

The Boriswave is a term used to describe the surge of immigration into the United Kingdom that followed the nation's withdrawal from the European Union (known as Brexit) and the introduction of new post-Brexit immigration policies. The word is a compound of Boris Johnson—the prime minister who introduced the policies—and wave. Between 2021 and 2024, 4.2 million migrants came to the UK as visa holders or as dependants of visa holders; the peak period was the 12 months to March 2023 during which 1,469,000 migrants arrived, with net migration measured at 944,000.

== Naming ==
The term Boriswave refers to the significant increase of immigration into the UK from January 2021, following Brexit, the end of freedom of movement for workers in the European Union, and the implementation of a new "Australia-style" points-based immigration system. The term is usually applied to the rise in non-EU immigration during this period, with significant numbers of immigrants arriving into the UK on work, student, and humanitarian visas from countries such as India, Pakistan, Nigeria, China and Zimbabwe.

The term was first used around 2024 by far-right or alt-right people on X (formerly Twitter).

== Background ==
Non-EU immigration by visa type 2019 to 2025

Following Brexit, Johnson's government introduced a new points-based immigration system aimed at prioritising skilled workers. This system aimed to prioritise higher-skilled workers, requiring applicants to meet criteria such as job offers and proficiency in the English language. However, at the same time, visa routes were expanded or adjusted to address labour shortages in sectors such as health and social care, agriculture, and hospitality. These changes included lowering salary thresholds from £30,000 to £25,600 and introducing new visa categories, which included allowing dependants to accompany workers or students. Compared to pre-Brexit immigration, there was a significant change to the number of dependants that came: in 2023, 53% of work and study visas were issued for dependants (c. 421,000 people), in comparison to an average of 19% between 2005 and 2020 (c. 64,000 dependents per year).

Despite earlier political commitments from both Johnson and his party, the Conservatives, to reduce immigration, the post-Brexit system caused net migration to rise significantly instead. According to official figures from the Office of National Statistics, net migration rose from around 224,000 in 2019 to over 600,000 in 2022 and more than 906,000 in 2023, representing an increase of 302%, more than fourfold. As of September 2025, the ONS found that a net 2.6 million people had entered the UK since the introduction of Johnson's new policies, a rate of population growth unprecedented in living memory.

== Origins of the term ==
The word Boriswave was first used by the Conservative Party to title a 71-minute video they had made of Johnson's speeches compiled over lo-fi music.

Boriswave was first used in 2019, when the Conservative Party used it as the title for a 71-minute video they had made that compiled clips of Johnson's speeches over lo-fi music. In 2024, the word re-entered online political discourse when it was popularised among far-right internet communities before entering wider public discussion. Early documented uses appeared on social media platforms such as Twitter in 2024, after which the phrase spread to online forums and right-leaning publications. By that time, its connotations significantly implied a betrayal or deception due to the juxtaposition of Brexit intending to isolate British sovereignty paired with a large and sudden increase in immigration from foreign nations. By late 2024 and into 2025, Boriswave had been adopted by mainstream media outlets and political figures, including members of the political party Reform UK, and had appeared in national newspapers and parliamentary discourse. The term has also been used by Labour prime minister Keir Starmer.

== Analysis ==
The term Boriswave has been used prominently in British political debate surrounding the nation's immigration policy. Reform UK has adopted the term to call for stricter immigration controls, such as abolishing indefinite leave to remain and replacing it with renewable visas. Since the 2024 general election, where the Conservative Party faced a landslide defeat, two Labour MPs, Tom Hayes and Connor Naismith have used the term in Parliament, describing the Boriswave as an example of the "failings of that [Conservative] Government" and Johnson's "betrayal", respectively. In 2025, Policy Exchange, a centre-right think tank, said that the Boriswave would impact housing, public services and community cohesion and called for an emergency census to provide government, local councils and other agencies with up-to-date population data.

Other commentators have criticised Boriswave as a politically-loaded term, and noted its origins in online far-right discourse. In October 2025, Robert Topinka, a reactionary digital politics expert, explained that the term was originally used as a racial epithet and continues to carry "a right-leaning framing". The term is often used by members of the far right parties Reform UK and Restore Britain, notably Nigel Farage; it has been argued that it is used to divert the cause of post-Brexit immigration from Brexit which many of its proponents support(ed) to Boris Johnson individually.
