= Deh-e Rahman =

Deh-e Rahman ده رحمان
- Village
- Location within Iran
- Coordinates: 31°05′56″N 61°48′01″E
- Country: Iran
- Province: Sistan and Baluchestan
- County: Hirmand
- Bakhsh: Central
- Rural District: Dust Mohammad

Population (2006)
  - Total: 385
- Time zone: UTC+3:30 (IRST)
  - Summer (DST): UTC+4:30 (IRDT)

Deh-e Rahman (Persian: ده رحمان, also Romanized as Deh-e Raḩmān; also known as Raḩmān) is a village in Dust Mohammad Rural District, in the Central District of Hirmand County, Sistan and Baluchestan Province, Iran. At the 2006 census, its population was 385, in 79 families.
