= List of things named after Vallabhbhai Patel =

Vallabhbhai Patel, commonly known as Sardar Patel, was an Indian independence activist, barrister and statesman who served as the first Deputy Prime Minister and Home Minister of India from 1947 to 1950. Places and institutions named after him include:

- Sardar Patel Memorial Trust
- Sardar Vallabhbhai Patel National Memorial, Ahmedabad
- Sardar Patel University, Gujarat
- Sardar Patel University of Police, Security and Criminal Justice, Jodhpur
- Sardar Patel Institute of Technology, Vasad
- Sardar Patel Vidyalaya, New Delhi
- Sardar Vallabhbhai Patel National Police Academy, Hyderabad
- Sardar Patel College of Engineering, Mumbai
- Sardar Patel Institute of Technology, Mumbai
- Sardar Vallabhbhai Patel Chowk in Katra Gulab Singh, Pratapgarh, Uttar Pradesh
- Sardar Vallabhbhai Patel Institute of Technology, Vasad
- Sardar Vallabhbhai Patel International Airport, Ahmedabad
- Sardar Vallabhbhai Patel Police Museum, Kollam
- Sardar Patel Stadium, Motera
- Sardar Vallabhbhai Patel Stadium, Navrangpura
- Sardar Vallabhbhai Patel Sports Enclave
- Vallabhbhai Patel Chest Institute
- Sardar Patel Road, Chennai
