= Tony Blair Associates =

Defunct organisation offering advice

- Formation: December, 2008
- Dissolved: September 2016
- Location: London, England
- Region served: Worldwide
- Leader: n/a
- Website: www.tonyblairoffice.org/pages/tony-blair-associates

Tony Blair Associates (TBA) was an umbrella organisation established by Tony Blair to "allow him to provide, in partnership with others, strategic advice on a commercial and pro bono basis, on political and economic trends and governmental reform". The profits from the firm went towards supporting Blair's "work on faith, Africa and climate change". The firm was closed down in September 2016.

== History ==
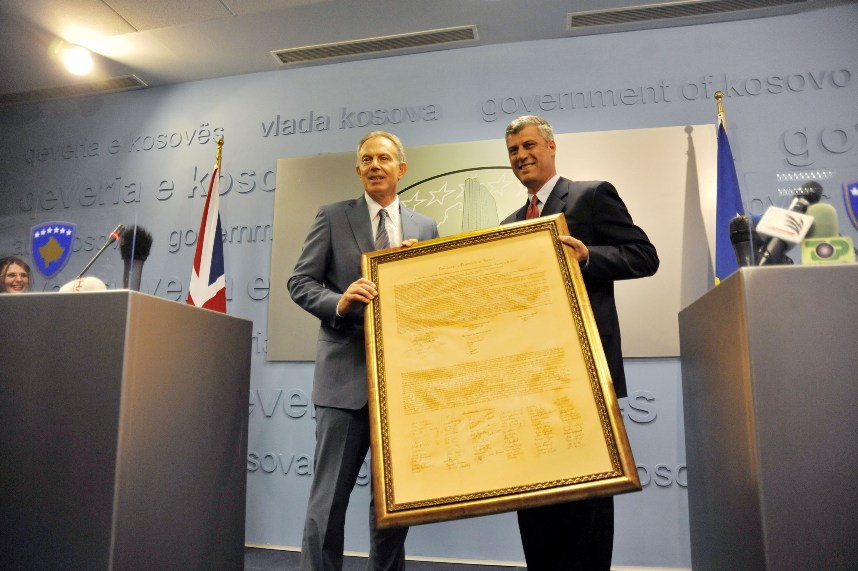
Former rebel leader Hashim Thaçi and Tony Blair with Declaration of Independence of Kosovo

Blair, with his Quartet and TBA roles, worked with the Kazakh government, advising the regime on judicial, economic and political reforms.

In June 2014, Blair was looking for an office Abu Dhabi to help attract middle-eastern business for TBA. By July, Blair had been hired to advise on the export of natural gas from Azerbaijan to Europe, a project being run by a consortium of companies led by BP.

== Criticism ==
Blair was subjected to criticism for potential conflicts of interest between his diplomatic role as a Middle East peace envoy and his work with Tony Blair Associates, and a number of prominent critics even called for him to be sacked from his peace envoy role.

Blair was subject to criticism after accusations of "whitewashing" the image and human rights record of the regime in Kazakhstan. In particular, opposition activists published an open letter in a Kazakh newspaper, Respublika, claiming Blair would have "blood on his hands" if he did not stop assisting President Nursultan Nazarbayev. Blair responded to such criticism by saying his choice to advise the country was an example of how he could "nudge controversial figures on a progressive path of reform" and stated that he received no personal profit from this advisory role. The Kazakhstan foreign minister said that the country was "honoured and privileged" to be receiving advice from Blair.

Blair was reported to have accepted a business advisory role with President Abdel Fattah el-Sisi of Egypt, a situation deemed incompatible with his role as Middle East peace envoy; Blair described the report as "nonsense".
