= P. S. Ramani =

Indian neurosurgeon (born 1938)

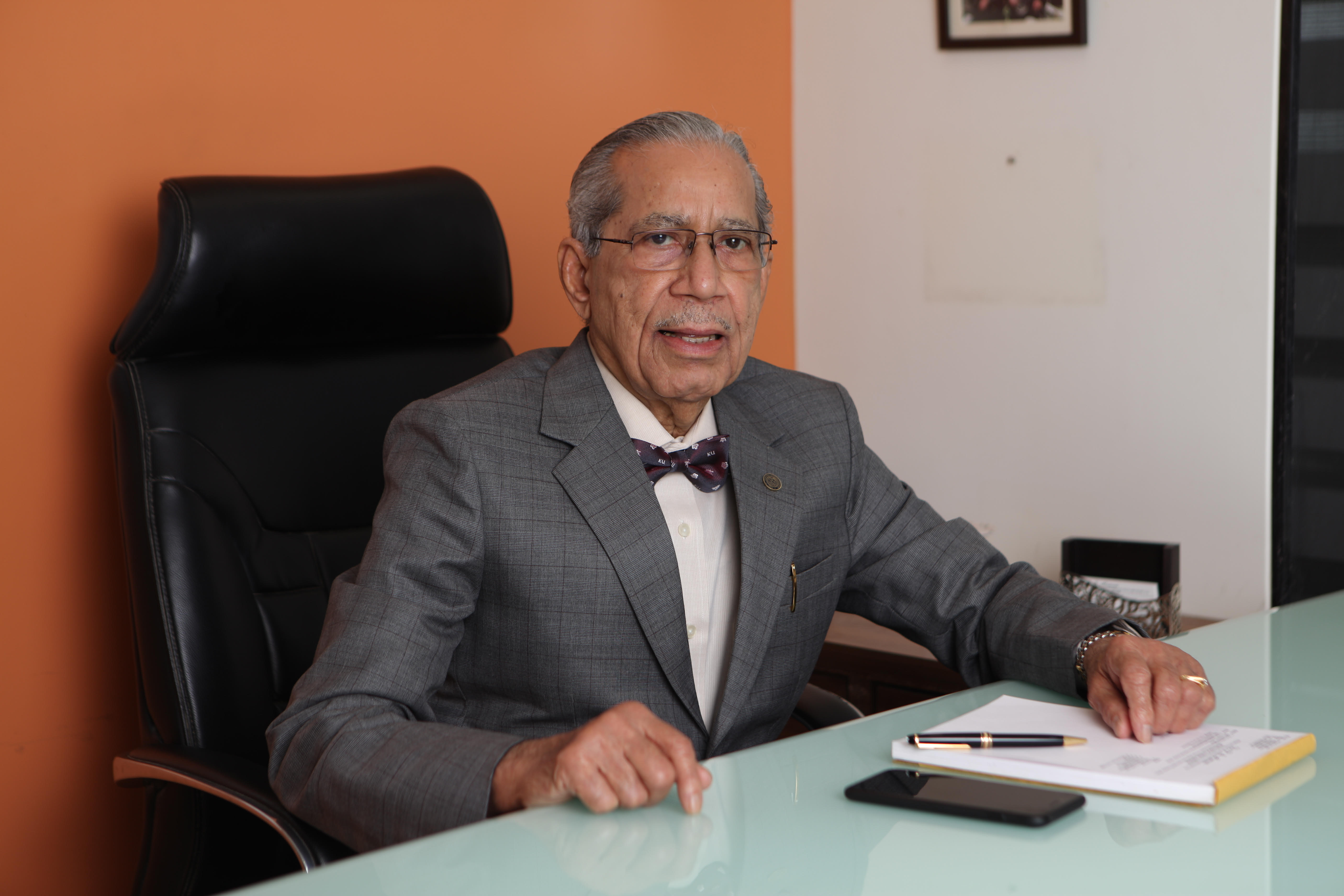
- Ramani in 2018
- Born: 30 November 1938 (age 87); Wadi Talaulim, Goa, Portuguese India, Portuguese Empire
- Education: Newcastle University Medical School
- Occupation: Neurospinal surgeon
- Website: drramani.com

Premanand Shantaram Ramani (born 30 November 1938) is an Indian neurosurgeon and writer, known for his work in Newcastle and his neurospinal surgery technique of "PLIF". He is currently the senior neurospinal surgeon at Lilavati Hospital, Mumbai. An annual marathon, titled "Dr P S Ramani Goa Marathon", is held in his honour in Goa.

== Early life ==
Ramani was born on 30 November 1938 to Ahilyabai and Shantaram, a forest officer, in the village of Wadi Talaulim in Goa. He was the fifth of six siblings. At the inter science examination of 1960, he secured a Distinction and won the Ambedkar Gold Medal. Following this, he was awarded a scholarship to Siddharth College, Bombay University. He then attended Topiwala National Medical College and B.Y.L. Nair Charitable Hospital, Mumbai, and specialised in neurosurgery. After completing his MBBS in 1965, he completed his MS at Nair Hospital in 1968.

== Career ==
Soon after completing his MS in Mumbai, Ramani moved to Malmö, Sweden, to study Intracranial pressure monitoring in 1972. Shortly after, he moved to Newcastle upon Tyne, England, to complete his advanced studies in neurosurgery. He completed his doctorate from the Newcastle University Medical School, specializing in neurosurgery, in 1973, then decided to return to India.

In 1973–1974, Ramani was posted to Goa Medical College, where he again gained credit for his work. After a few months, he moved to Bombay, where he still resides.

In the medical fraternity, Ramani is known for his innovations and techniques in neurosurgery. One of these is his technique of disc removal, called the PLIF Ramani Technique. Devised in 1973, Posterior Lumbar Interbody Fission is a technique now used extensively to correct spondylolysis and spondylolisthesis.

Ramani later retired as the Professor and Head of the Department of Neurosurgery at LTM Medical College and Hospital, Bombay University (after completing more than two thousand brain operations per year), and as an Oncological Neuro-Spinal Surgeon at Tata Memorial Hospital in Mumbai. He has since been the president of the Association of Neuro-Spinal Surgeons of India and the former president of the Neuro-trauma Society of India.

Currently, he is a practising neurosurgeon, and the senior neurospinal surgeon at Lilavati Hospital and Research Centre, Mumbai. He was involved in the spinal surgery of Sarika, the ex-wife of award-winning actor and director Kamal Haasan, in 2001. He has even treated the Goan playwright, poet and politician Vishnu Wagh in 2016. Some of his other patients include Baba Amte, C. R. Vyas and Ramdev Baba's brother.

== Works ==
=== Textbooks ===
- Ramani, P.S., ed. (2019). Human Spine and Pedicle Screws.
- Ramani, P.S., ed. (2012). WFNS Spine Committee: Text book of Surgical Management of Cervical Disc Herniation. JP Medical Ltd. ISBN 9789350255674.
- Ramani, P.S., ed. (2015). WFNS Spine Committee: Text book on Thoracic Spine. JP Medical Ltd. ISBN 9789352500079.
- Ramani, P.S. (2010). Surgical techniques in Spinal Surgery – Cervical Spine. Jaypee Brothers Publishers. ISBN 9788184487824.

Ramani sponsors a cricket tournament and is actively involved in the Dr Ramani Goa Marathon, organized by the Ahilyabai Ramani Pratishtan, an organisation founded by him in his mother's memory. He even participates in it. People from around the world participate in this marathon. At the event, Ramani addresses youngsters to remain active and teaches them the importance of exercise, no matter the age. Ramani has also started a museum in Goa, containing his research work in Neuro Spinal Surgery, as well as his social work and published books.

== Awards and accolades ==
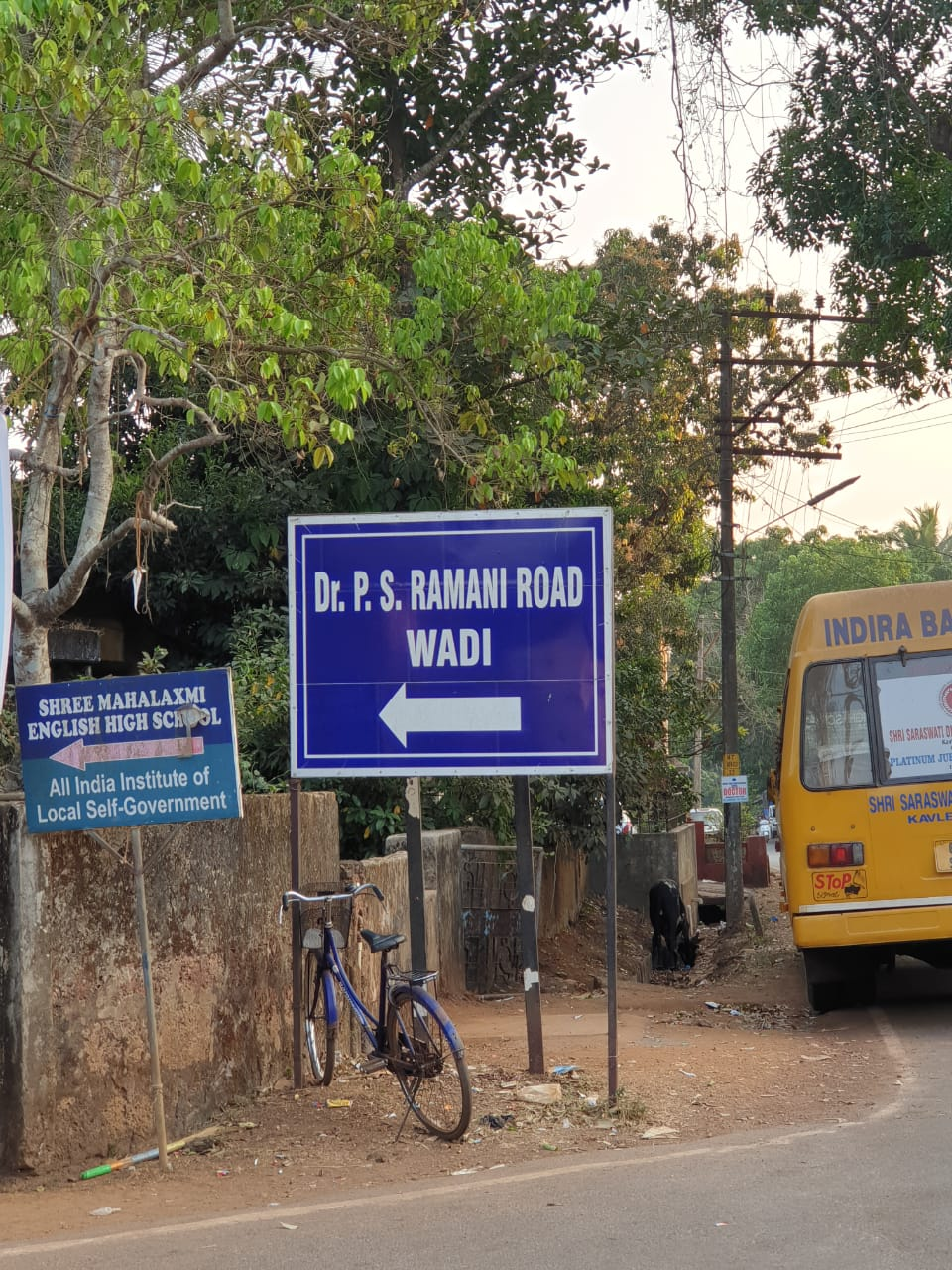
Road sign to Dr PS Ramani Road in Wadi

In 2011, Ramani was presented with a lifetime achievement award by the British Association of Spinal Surgeons, and Hungary issued a postage stamp to honour him. Soon after, a hospital in Cirebon, Indonesia named an operation theatre block after him. The people of his village, Wadi-Talaulim, named a village road after him. He was chosen for the Gomant Vibhushan Award and the Saraswat Ratna Award in 2019.

Ramani was awarded the Life Time Achievement Award by the World Federation of Neurosurgical Societies Spine Committee in 2021. In 2022, LTMG Hospital, popularly known as Sion Hospital, inaugurated an auditorium named after him.
