= List of things named after C. Rajagopalachari =

C. Rajagopalachari
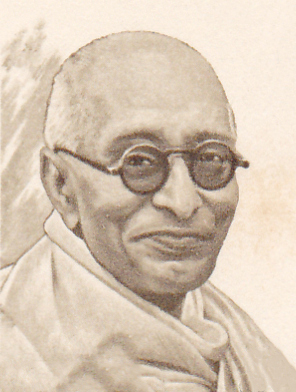
- Born: 10 December 1878; Salem district, Madras Presidency, British India
- Died: 25 December 1972 (aged 94); Madras, Tamil Nadu, India (present-day Chennai)

Chakravarthi Rajagopalachari (10 December 1878 – 25 December 1972), popularly known as Rajaji or C. R., also known as Mootharignar Rajaji (Rajaji, the Scholar Emeritus), was an Indian lawyer, Indian independence activist, politician, writer, statesman and leader of the Indian National Congress who served as the last Governor-General of India. He served as the Chief Minister or Premier of the Madras Presidency, Governor of West Bengal, Minister for Home Affairs of the Indian Union and Chief Minister of Madras state. He was the founder of the Swatantra Party and the first recipient of India's highest civilian award, the Bharat Ratna. Raja vehemently opposed the usage of nuclear weapons and was a proponent of world peace and disarmament. He was also nicknamed the Mango of Salem.

== Tamil Nadu ==
=== Chennai ===
- Rajaji Hall, previously known as Banqueting Hall.
- Rajaji Memorial: Rajagopalachari's house in Thorapalli, Hosur Taluk, Krishnagiri District is maintained as a Memorial House by the Government of Tamil Nadu.
- Rajaji Salai – Earlier North Beach Road. Both Fort St. George and the Chennai Port lie on Rajaji Salai
- Bhavan's Rajaji Vidyashram: School of Bharatiya Vidya Bhavan in Kilpauk.

=== Madurai ===
- Rajaji Children's park in Tamukkam.
- Government Rajaji Hospital, formerly Erskines Hospital, established in 1842.

=== Tiruchirappalli ===
- Rajaji Nagar

=== Thoothukkudi ===
- Rajaji Park

== Andhra Pradesh ==
=== Chittoor ===
- Rajaji Nagar

== vijayawada ==
- c.raja gopalachari street

== Karnataka ==
=== Bangalore ===
- Rajaji Nagar

== Kerala ==
=== Cochin ===
- Rajaji Road

== Madhya Pradesh ==
=== Bhopal ===
- Chakravarti Rajagopalachari Institute of Management

== Uttarakhand ==
- Rajaji National Park

== New Delhi ==
- Rajaji Marg
