= Rehman =

Rehman is a given name and a surname. Notable people with the name include:

== People ==
- Rehman, alternative spelling of Rahman (name)
- Rehman (actor) (1921–1984), an Indian film actor
- Rehman (Pakistani actor) (1937–2005), a Pakistani-Bangladeshi film actor

=== Surname ===
- Saleema Rehman (born 1990/91), Afghan refugee doctor
- Waheeda Rehman (born 1938), Indian actress

=== Given name ===
- Rehman Chishti (born 1978), British politician
- Rehman Dakait, Pakistani gangster
- Rehman Khalid (born 1993), Pakistani baseball player
- Rehman Rahi (1925–2023), Kashmiri poet, translator and critic
- Rehman Sobhan, Bangladeshi economist and freedom fighter

== See also ==
- Rahman (disambiguation)
