= Wadi-Talaulim =

- Village
- Location within Goa Location within India
- Coordinates: 15°22′36.42384″N 73°58′23.06244″E
- Country: India
- State: Goa
- District: South Goa
- Taluka: Ponda

Government
  - Type: Panchayat

Area
  - Total: 1.61 km^{2} (0.62 sq mi)
- Elevation: 9 m (30 ft)

Population (2011)
  - Total: 2,554
  - Density: 1,590/km^{2} (4,110/sq mi)
- Time zone: UTC+5:30 (IST)
- Postcode: 403401
- Area code: 08343

Wadi-Talaulim is a village in Ponda taluka in Goa, India. As of 2018, it has a population of 3,800.

== Etymology ==
Wadi Talaulim derives its name from Konkani, in which Talaulim means ‘land between three mountains and a river’ while Wadi is a place where a few farmers and other villagers reside.

== Location ==
A 4-kilometre drive from Ponda brings you into Wadi-Talaulim. It is located 25 kilometres east of the state capital Panaji. The village is bordered by Borim, Durbhat and Quela on one side and the Zuari river on the other.

== History ==
Wadi and Talaulim were two separate villages, as they belonged to separate communidades. A few years after the liberation of Goa in 1961, they began being governed by the same panchayat.

Both, Wadi and Talaulim have many temples, dedicated to Hindu deities like Narayan Dev, Hanuman, Ganpati, Krishna, Shree Bhutnath, Mahalaxmi and Sateri Ladbai.

Most residents of Wadi-Talaulim are originally from Salcete’s villages of Loutolim, Colva, etc. Nearly 80% of Talaulim's residents can trace their roots to Colva alone. During the initial years after the Portuguese conquest of Goa, many of the residents of the villages of Salcete (which was a part of the Velhas Conquistas) shifted to Talaulim, to escape religious persecution and the mass Christianization of Goa. Wadi-Talaulim also has residents from Canacona, who shifted here many years after the Velhas Conquistas for a variety of other reasons.

Bhatwada, Talsal, Vadem, Camara Bhat, Holi Bhat, Bhedxem, Ladbhai Vaddo, Sokol Vaddo, Voilo Vaddo, Pimpla Bhat, Kasswada, Wade Vaddo, Modle Vaddo, Pursha Bhat etc are the various wadde (wards) of the village.

== Demographics ==
According to the 2011 Census, Camurlim has a population of 2554, with 1% belonging to the Scheduled tribes. About 41% of the population belongs to the working class. The village has a literacy rate of 92%.
