= Kemps Corner =

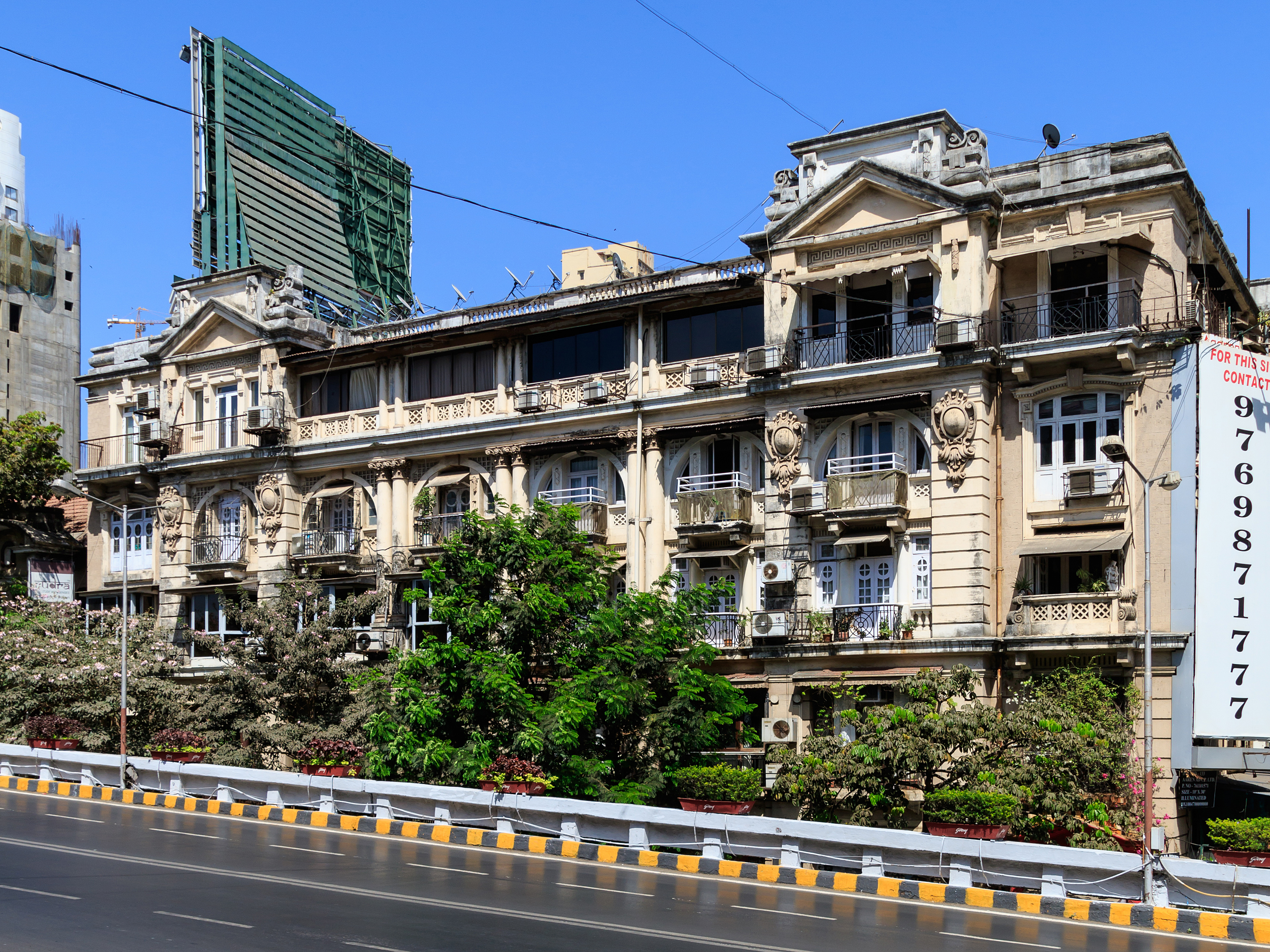
- A building at Kemps Corner

- Location within Mumbai
- Coordinates: 18.9629°N 72.8054°E
- Country: India
- State: Maharashtra
- District: Mumbai City
- Metro: Mumbai

Languages
  - Official: Marathi
- Time zone: UTC+5:30 (IST)
- PIN: 400026
- Area code: 022
- Vehicle registration: MH 01
- Civic agency: BMC

Kemps Corner is an upmarket neighbourhood in South Mumbai. It is flanked by Altamount Road on one side and Malabar Hill on the other. It lies at the intersection of Breach Candy, Warden Road, Pedder Road and Nepean Sea Road.

The place has several upmarket residential establishments as well as high end shopping outlets. Work on the Kemps Corner flyover started in April 1964 and was opened on 14 April 1965. The flyover is shown in several films.
