= Doing Business in 21st Century India =

2008 nonfiction book by Gunjan Bagla

- Author: Gunjan Bagla
- Language: English
- Subject: Marketing
- Genre: Non-fiction
- Publisher: Business Plus
- Publication date: 2008
- Publication place: United States
- Media type: Book
- Pages: 272
- ISBN: 0-446-40224-9

Doing Business in 21st Century India: How to Profit Today in Tomorrow's Most Exciting Market is a 2008 non-fiction marketing book written by Gunjan Bagla, an Indian-American author and businessman and the managing director of Amritt, Inc.. The book is a guide for North American and European firms on doing business in the rapidly developing Indian market. It was published in hardcover in July 2008 by Business Plus, an imprint of Hachette Book Group USA. The book was released in hardback in the United States in July 2008 and in paperback to the rest of the world in September 2008.

== Overview ==
The book is mainly targeted towards Western investors and entrepreneurs. It contains overviews and analyses of Indian industries that are currently experiencing growth, as well as information about the financial situation in different regions in India and the various religious beliefs and customs. It also gives a brief summary of India's recent history. Audiobook and Kindle versions of the book have reportedly sold well; be aware that the audiobook is abridged from the original, while the Kindle book is identical to the printed volume.

The book cover illustration is a picture of a man with a laptop computer riding an elephant. Bagla narrates the story of the blind men and the elephant in the introduction to the book as a way to describe India to Western businesspeople.

== Critical reception ==
The book currently holds five-star reviews from several of Amazon.com's top reviewers and Vine Voices (reviewers who are given access to advance copies of items such as books, movies, and electronics); top-ten reviewer Joanna Daneman described it as "a very readable, enjoyable book and one that anyone doing business in India ought to read as a starting point." A review of the book on the website ManageSmarter said it "opens the door for anyone seeking to expand or even begin business in India." Garima Sharma's review for the Hindustan Times comments on the book's accessibility, noting that "the only bummer" is Bagla's "surprising neutrality" to 'Indianness'. Other reviewers based in India have similarly expressed views that Bagla should have praised the Indian systems and practices more vigorously.

The book was positively reviewed in the business publications India Today, Business Line, and Businessworld. Ron Somers, the president of the U.S.-India Business Council, called the book "required reading for anyone who wants or has business in India." Jagdish Sheth, the Charles H. Kellstadt Professor of Marketing at the Goizueta Business School of Emory University, called it "an excellent practical guide," and R. Gopalakrishnan of the Tata Group described it as "a refreshingly simple book on a very complex subject."

== See also ==
- Globalisation in India
- International business
