= Sankara Narayana =

Sankara Narayana is a name conjoining names of Hindu gods Sankar and Narayana. Shankar Narayan, Shankaranarayana, Sankaranarayanan or variations may refer to Indian names:

== Full name ==
- Śaṅkaranārāyaṇa (840–900), astronomer-mathematician from the Chera Kingdom
- Shankar Narayanan, Indian-American entrepreneur

== First name ==
- Shankaraji Narayan Gandekar (1665–1707), minister in the Maratha Kingdom.
- Sankaranarayana Iyen, Diwan of Travancore
- R. Sankara Narayanan Thampi (1911–1989), freedom fighter and politician from Kerala
- Shankar Narayan Singh Deo (born 1922), politician from West Bengal
- K. Sankaranarayanan (1932–2022), politician from Kerala
- K. Sankaranarayana Pillai (1945–2021), politician from Kerala
- T. V. Sankaranarayanan (1945–2022), Carnatic vocalist
- Sankaranarayana Menon (1929–2023) or Unni Gurukkal, Kalaripayattu teacher

== Surname ==
- Gopal Sankaranarayanan, Supreme Court lawyer
- Rajan Sankaranarayanan, biologist
- Malagundla Sankaranarayana, politician from Andhra Pradesh

== Places ==
- Shankaranarayana, village in Udupi district, Karnataka

== See also ==
- Shankar Narayan Bank, 1956 Bengali language film
- Narayanan Sankar (1945–2022), industrialist
