= Wharton India Economic Forum =

Organization

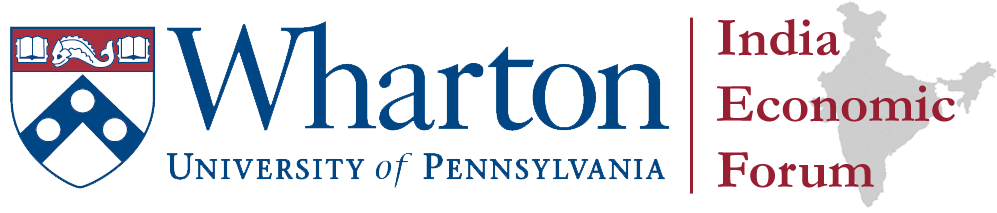
- Abbreviation: WIEF
- Formation: 1996
- Type: Business Conference
- Location: Philadelphia, Pennsylvania, United States
- Chairpersons: Nirav Sahni, Prutha Kale, Shreya Agarwal, Soumya Dubey, Yashodhana Raj
- Website: www.whartonindiaeconomicforum.com

The Wharton India Economic Forum (WIEF), established in 1996 at The Wharton School, is a student-run business forum in the United States focused on India. WIEF is one of the largest India-based economic and business conferences in the United States. It is attended by over 800 people annually and receives extensive media coverage in India and the wider business by leading publications, such as The Wall Street Journal, Forbes, The New York Times, The Economic Times and The Times of India.

WIEF's describes its mission as to "engage the world's attention on India's enormous potential and the limitless possibilities the country offers".

== Speakers at the pre-2012 conferences ==
Government & Policy

- Dr. A.P.J Abdul Kalam, 11th President of India
- P. Chidambaram, Home Affairs Minister and former Finance Minister of India
- Henry Paulson, 74th United States Treasury Secretary and former CEO and chairman of Goldman Sachs
- Dr. Montek Singh Ahluwalia, Deputy Chairman, Planning Commission, Government of India
- Shashi Tharoor, Member of Indian Parliament and former Under Secretary General of the United Nations
- Praful Patel, Minister of State for Civil Aviation, Government of India
- Sachin Pilot, Minister of State, Ministry of Communications & Information Technology, Government of India
- Naveen Jindal, Member of Indian Parliament
- Kalpana Kochhar, Country Head India, International Monetary Fund

Industry

- Anil Ambani, Chairman, Reliance Anil Dhirubhai Ambani Group
- Mukesh Ambani, Chairman and MD, Reliance Industries
- Sunil Mittal, Founder, Chairman and Group CEO, Bharti Enterprises
- N. R. Narayana Murthy, Non-Executive Chairman and Chief Mentor, Infosys
- Nandan Nilekani, Chairman, Unique Identification Authority of India and former CEO, Infosys
- Kushal Pal Singh, Chairman and CEO, DLF
- Rahul Bajaj, Chairman, Bajaj Group
- Adi Godrej, Chairman, Godrej Group
- Kiran Mazumdar-Shaw, Chairman & Managing Director, Biocon Limited

Finance

- Jim Rogers, Financial Investor and Author
- Deepak Parekh, Chairman, HDFC
- Chanda Kochhar, CEO & MD, ICICI Bank Limited
- George Soros, Chairman, Soros Fund Management and the Open Society Institute
- Vikram Akula, CEO and Founder, SKS Microfinance

Media & Entertainment

- Abhishek Bachchan, Actor, Bollywood
- Anil Kapoor, Actor, Bollywood
- Vidya Balan, Actress, Bollywood
- Karan Johar, Indian Film Director, Producer, and TV celebrity
- Rakeysh Omprakash Mehra, Indian Filmmaker and Screenwriter
- Rohan Sippy, Indian Film Director
- Shankar Mahadevan, Indian Music Composer and Singer
- Subhash Chandra, Chairman, Zee Entertainment Enterprises Limited (ZEEL)

Sports

- Sunil Gavaskar, former Indian Cricketer
- Vijay Amritraj, former Indian Tennis Player and Sports Commentator
- Geet Sethi, Professional Billiards Player

Other

- Dominic Barton, Global Managing Director, McKinsey & Company

== 16th WIEF, 2012 ==
The 16th annual Wharton India Economic Forum was held on January 9, 2012, in Mumbai, India. This was the first time the WIEF was held in India.

The speakers included:

- K.V. Kamath, Chairman, Infosys Limited
- Ajay Piramal, Chairman, Piramal Enterprises Limited
- Chanda Kochhar, MD & CEO, ICICI Bank
- Keki Mistry, Vice Chairman and CEO, HDFC Limited
- Niranjan Hiranandani, Co-Founder and MD, Hiranandani Group
- R Gopalakrishnan, Director, Tata Sons
- Vinod Rai, Comptroller & Auditor General of India
- Gunit Chadha, MD & CEO, Deutsche Bank India
- Manish Kejriwal, ex-India Head, Temasek Holdings

== 17th WIEF, 2013 ==
Keynote Speakers

- Montek Singh Ahluwalia (via live videoconference) – Deputy Chairman, Planning Commission of India
- Arvind Kejriwal, Founder, Aam Aadmi Party
- Ron Somers – President, US-India Business Council
- Dilip Cherian – Consulting Partner, Perfect Relations (Moderator)

Milind Deora opted out for an unspecified reason.

Media and Entertainment Panelists

- Javed Akhtar – Poet, Lyricist, and Scriptwriter
- Shabana Azmi – Actress
- Boman Irani – Actor
- Aseem Chhabra – Freelance writer (Moderator)
- Sudhir Mishra – Director and screenwriter

Women's Empowerment Panelists

- Lakshmi Pratury – Co-Host, TEDIndia
- Shabana Azmi – Actress
- Vrinda Grover – Lawyer, High Court India
- Jaideep Bose – Editorial Director, Times of India Group (Moderator)

Private Equity/Venture Capital Panelists

- Shankar Narayanan – MD, The Carlyle Group India

Finance Panelists

- L.N. Balaji – President, ITC Infotech USA
- Thomas Brunner – Partner & General Counsel, LeapFrog Investments
- Amit Saxena – CEO, Karvy Financial Services Limited

Entrepreneurship Panelists

- Sasha Mirchandani – Managing Director and Founder, Kae Capital
- Samir Mitra – Advisor, Prime Minister of India
- Aneesh Reddy – Co-Founder and CEO, Capillary Technologies
- Devita Saraf – Chief Executive Officer, Vu Technologies

=== Narendra Modi controversy ===
In 2013, the WIEF organizers invited the Gujarat chief minister Narendra Modi to deliver the keynote address via video-conferencing. Toorjo Ghose, an assistant professor at the University of Pennsylvania and a small group of colleagues put together a petition after learning about Wharton's invitation to Modi. Kasturi Sen, a Philadelphia-based attorney, created a group on Facebook and initially hosted the petition there. The petition cited the revocation of visa to Modi in 2005 by the US state department. They were joined by Ania Loomba and Suvir Kaul, both Indian-American UPenn professors, who were critical of Modi's handling of the 2002 Hindu-Muslim riots, started formal a petition demanding the cancellation of the invitation, failing which they would protest his virtual presence at the event.

The petition was sent to Amy Gutmann, the UPenn president. The university leadership stepped in to diffuse what it saw as a potentially explosive situation. The WIEF organizers had to cancel the invitation, even though they stood by the earlier decision to invite Modi. They stated that they wanted to avoid putting Modi in a "compromising position". At the time of the decision, the petition had been signed by around 135 people, and the number of signatories grew to 250 later. A senior Wharton official distanced Wharton from the decision stating "Make no mistake, the move to not have Modi was a result of UPenn, not Wharton," pointing to the fact that not a single Wharton faculty member had signed the petition demanding cancellation of Modi's speech.

In Modi's support, the Shiv Sena leader Suresh Prabhakar Prabhu scrapped his visit to Wharton. Another speaker, the Wall Street Journal writer and journalist Sadanand Dhume, also pulled out from the forum in protest. He was replaced by Sudhir Parikh, a New Jersey–based eminent physician, philanthropist, publisher and Padma Shri awardee. However, Parikh too withdrew from the conference as a mark of protest. He stated, "The manner in which the committee has been pressurised to rescind its invitation to Gujarat Chief Minister Narendra Modi on entirely suspicious grounds, I feel the intellectual integrity of the forum has been compromised." Ron Somers, also a keynote speaker, termed the decision to drop Modi as "unfortunate and disrespectful", but said that he would attend the event in order to make his point about free speech. Another keynote speaker Mohandas Pai also backed out complaining about mistreatment of Indians outside India; he mentioned the "shabby" treatment of Narendra Modi among other incidents such as the Italian marines controversy, Pakistan's reaction to Afzal Guru's hanging and Sri Lanka's treatment of Indian fishermen. The U.S. Congressman Eni Faleomavaega expressed disappointment at the decision, criticizing the protesters as "a segment of professors and students who are reaching beyond the law and coming awfully close to violating the rights of others who have a different view". Several others, including Rajiv Malhotra and the Indian Union Minister Shashi Tharoor also stated that Modi should not have been disinvited.

The Adani group, the platinum sponsors of the event, withdrew their sponsorship. Subsequently, Viacom 18's Colors, the silver sponsors, also pulled out. Hexaware, the bronze sponsor, also withdrew sponsorship, saying that its chairman Atul Nishar (a keynote speaker) would be unable to attend the event due to other business engagements.

Some media outlets reported that Arvind Kejriwal had been invited instead of Modi, but Kejriwal clarified that he had received the invitation several days before the decision to drop Modi was made. Kejriwal also expressed his disapproval of the decision to drop Modi.

After the controversy, the organizers announced that no media organizations other than TV Asia would be allowed to cover the event. This was for the first time in the 17 years history of the event that media was not given free access to cover the forum. A coalition of activists opposed to the decision came together under the banner of Americans for Free Speech, and organized a peaceful protest at the venue.

The cancellation of Modi's speech ignited a debate on free speech on UPenn campus. Assem Shukla, Associate Professor of Surgery at the Perelman School of Medicine at the University of Pennsylvania stated: "Penn's tradition of free speech was celebrated when extreme anti-Israel speakers, Louis Farrakhan of the Nation of Islam and radical Occupy Wall Street protesters held sway on campus. But free speech became an empty homily when it came to the speaker selection of a group of Indian-American business school students" Loomba stated that uninviting a speaker is also freedom of speech. She said "Modi supporters can beam him in, but not in my house".

== WIEF Chairs ==
- 2026: Aditya Vora, Joel Johnson, Rahul Kartick, Simran Lala, Vasundhara Singh
- 2025: Nirav Sahni, Prutha Kale, Shreya Agarwal, Soumya Dubey, Yashodhana Raj
- 2024: Deeksha Senguttuvan . Kanupriya Raman . Kumar Sambhava . Pranav Damani . Shreeya Bhutani
- 2023: Shuchi Maheshwari . Ishwar Prasad . Nayan Bader . Sharanya Sahai . Rhea Grover
- 2022: Alekhya Audi . Harshit Sohu . Meghank Garg . Gautam . Mansukh
- 2021: Rishabh Jain . Divya Kamerkar . Gaurav Lulu . Devika Mittal . Anooj Vikam
- 2020: Anirudh Viswanathan . Noopur Kamal . Prahal Ghai . Surekha Cherukuri
- 2019: Juhi Bhatnagar . Kartik Das . Khushboo Goel . Sonal Panda . Swati Ganeti
- 2018: Ankit Agarwal · Hena Mehta · Abhinav Prateek · Twishmay Shankar
- 2017: Aman Jain · Ankita Bajaj · Divya Menon · Praveen Chunduru
- 2016: Varun Udeshi · Vibhav Chokhani · Vidur Mahajan · Vikram Arumilli
- 2015: Anna Ahmed · Kirti Choudhary · Alvira Rao · Ankit Saxena
- 2014: Nikhil Khosla · Aditi Ravichandar · Shweta Singh · Manoj Vasudevan
- 2013: Akshay Bhushan · Salil Gupta · Tanmay Mishra · Tegh Singh Bedi
- 2012: Shuchi Pandya · Parth Shah · Shamik Shah · Tahem Veer Verma
- 2011: Tushar Aggarwal · Rohit Chauhan · Aditya Dada · Saksham Karwal · Derek Kightlinger
- 2010: Rahul Jetley · Vikramjit Singh · Sathyanarayan Anand · Nina Chandra · Jay Raghavan
- 2009: Arjun Ghose · Arjun Madan · Anshul Mittal
- 2008: Vivek Garg · Abhishek Gupta · Vivek Garg · Akshay Madhavan
- 2006: Raj Pandey · Ashish Khemka · Piyush Jain · Sameera Chilakapati
- 2005: Hari Prakash · Amit Soni · Abhishek Chauhan · Kanush Chaudhary
- 2004: Vijay Shreedhar · Samarth Singh · Kunal Bahl
- 2003: Nikhil Sawhney · Niraj Shah · Aditya Talwar
- 2002: Kiran Hebbar · Rushabh Kapashi · Anirudh Patni
- 2001: Sarin Suvarna · Venkatesh Saha
- 2000: Ashesh Badani · Saahil Mahajan
- 1999: Sujith Banerjee · Ankur Daga
- 1998: Manju Chandrasekhar · Shannon Shah
- 1997: Khawar Mann · Prashant Mehta
- 1996: Vinnie Badinehal · Anjan Malik · Vikram Limaye (Founders)
