= Gunjan Bagla =

American businessman and writer

- Education: Indian Institute of Technology Kanpur; Southern Illinois University
- Occupations: Author, public speaker, businessperson
- Website: theindiaexpert.com amritt.com

Gunjan Bagla is an Indian-American author, blogger, businessman, and public speaker. He is the founder and managing director of Amritt Ventures, a consulting firm based in Hermosa Beach, California, and a charter member of The Indus Entrepreneurs.

== Background and education ==
Bagla currently lives in the Los Angeles area in United States and teaches business seminars for industry executives at the California Institute of Technology and UCLA Extension. He is a member of the Asia Society and a Charter Member of the Indus Entrepreneurs (TiE).

== Amritt Ventures ==
In 2003, Bagla started Amritt Ventures, a consulting firm based in the Los Angeles area; he currently acts as its managing director. The stated purpose of the company is to aid North American and European firms in becoming familiar with routine Asian business practices, and specifically in marketing their products to India. Amritt provides its clients with training workshops on topics like human resources issues in India, the financial and legal environment, and Indian culture.

Notable clients of Amritt include Kraft Foods, Raytheon, Trijicon, Clorox, Johnson & Johnson, Reckitt Benckiser, Burt's Bees and Vivendi.

== Writing ==
Bagla's book Doing Business in 21st Century India was released by Business Plus, an imprint of Hachette Book Group, in July 2008. The book is a guide for North American and European investors and entrepreneurs on doing business in modern India. The book was released to highly positive reviews; Jagdish Sheth, the Charles H. Kellstadt Professor of Marketing at the Goizueta Business School of Emory University, commented that it was "an excellent practical guide," while R. Gopalakrishnan of the Tata Group called it "a refreshingly simple book on a very complex subject."

Bagla also writes articles on global business, particularly on the ties between the United States and India. He has served as a guest columnist for the Harvard Business Review, writing about topics such as business in India and U.S.-India business relations. He has also written guest columns for Med Device Online about the medical device industry in India.

== Other publications and appearances ==
In 2007 Bagla was interviewed by Gamasutra, a video-game development website, about the impact the release of the Xbox 360 would have on the Indian gaming market. Bagla remarked that "most mainstream American [game] titles can translate well into the Indian market"; he went on to list Quake, Counter-Strike, and Age of Empires as some of the most successful titles.

In 2008 the Los Angeles Times interviewed Bagla about the impending purchase of DreamWorks by Anil Ambani, an Indian business magnate and chairman of Reliance Anil Dhirubhai Ambani Group. Bagla compared Ambani to "Rockefeller, Bill Gates and Howard Hughes." Bagla was also interviewed by BusinessWeek following the 2008 Mumbai attacks, commenting on the effect the attacks could have on foreign business in India.

In April 2010, Bagla was the keynote speaker at the annual conference of the South Asian Studies Association, held at the University of Southern California. His topic was "Globalization: India and the US." Bagla also gave comments to The New York Times after attending a meeting with President Barack Obama during his visit to India in 2010.

In 2014, Bagla was interviewed by The Wall Street Journal about the economic effects of Narendra Modi’s election as prime minister of India. The Journal interviewed Bagla again about the special requirements India imposed on tech companies before Modi’s reelection in 2019 and after his reelection in 2020. Bagla commented the foreign tech companies “should not rest in asserting their point of view” to the authorities in India.

Bagla was interviewed by Med Device Online about the medical device industry in India in 2017.

Bagla was also interviewed by The New York Times about business travel and bilateral trade in the wake of airline companies adding more flights to India in 2020. He opined that the Indian government “has become more business friendly.”

In 2022, Bagla gave comments to The New York Times after the death of his colleague Umang Gupta. He called Gupta “an exceptional leader who could bring a group from chaos to calmness.” Bagla also appeared at Azadi Ka Amrit Mahosav, an event held in California celebrating the 75th anniversary of India’s independence in 2022.

In 2023, Bagla launched a petition requesting that Indian Prime Minister Narendra Modi establish an Indian consulate in Los Angeles. According to the Daily News, the campaign received approximately 4,300 signatures and letters of support from officials and organizations including Los Angeles Mayor Karen Bass, the American Jewish Committee, and the World Affairs Council of Orange County. On September 22, 2024, Prime Minister Modi announced the decision to open the consulate. In August 2025, the Los Angeles Times reported that the Indian government had signed a 10-year lease for a 20,507-square-foot space at the Aon Center in Los Angeles. Bagla noted that the new office makes California the only state in the world to host two Indian consulates.

== See also ==
- Business process outsourcing in India
- Globalisation in India
- International business
