= Indian nationalism =

Territorial nationalist movement

The flag of India, which is often used as a symbol of Indian nationalism.

Indian nationalism is an instance of civic nationalism. It is inclusive of all of the people of India, despite their diverse ethnic, linguistic and religious backgrounds. Indian nationalism can trace roots to pre-colonial India, but was fully developed during the Indian independence movement which campaigned against nearly two centuries of British rule. Indian nationalism quickly rose to popularity in India through these united anti-colonial coalitions and movements. Independence movement figures like Mahatma Gandhi, Subhas Chandra Bose, and Jawaharlal Nehru spearheaded the Indian nationalist movement, with the Indian National Congress playing a major role.

India's independence in 1947 was coupled with separation from Muslim-majority Pakistan, with that nation being carved out of British India's northwestern and eastern regions. Afterwards, Prime Minister Nehru and his successors continued to campaign on Indian nationalism in the face of border wars with both China and Pakistan, with the latter clashing several times over the Kashmir border region. After the Indo-Pakistani war of 1971 and the Bangladesh Liberation War, which resulted in East Pakistan's independence, Indian nationalism reached its post-independence peak. However by the 1980s, religious tensions reached a boiling point, the Indian National Congress lost its political dominance and became more authoritarian, and Indian nationalism sluggishly collapsed in the following decades. Despite its decline and the rise of religious nationalism, Indian nationalism and its historic figures continue to strongly influence the politics of India and reflect an opposition to the sectarian strands of Hindu nationalism and Muslim nationalism.

== National consciousness in India ==
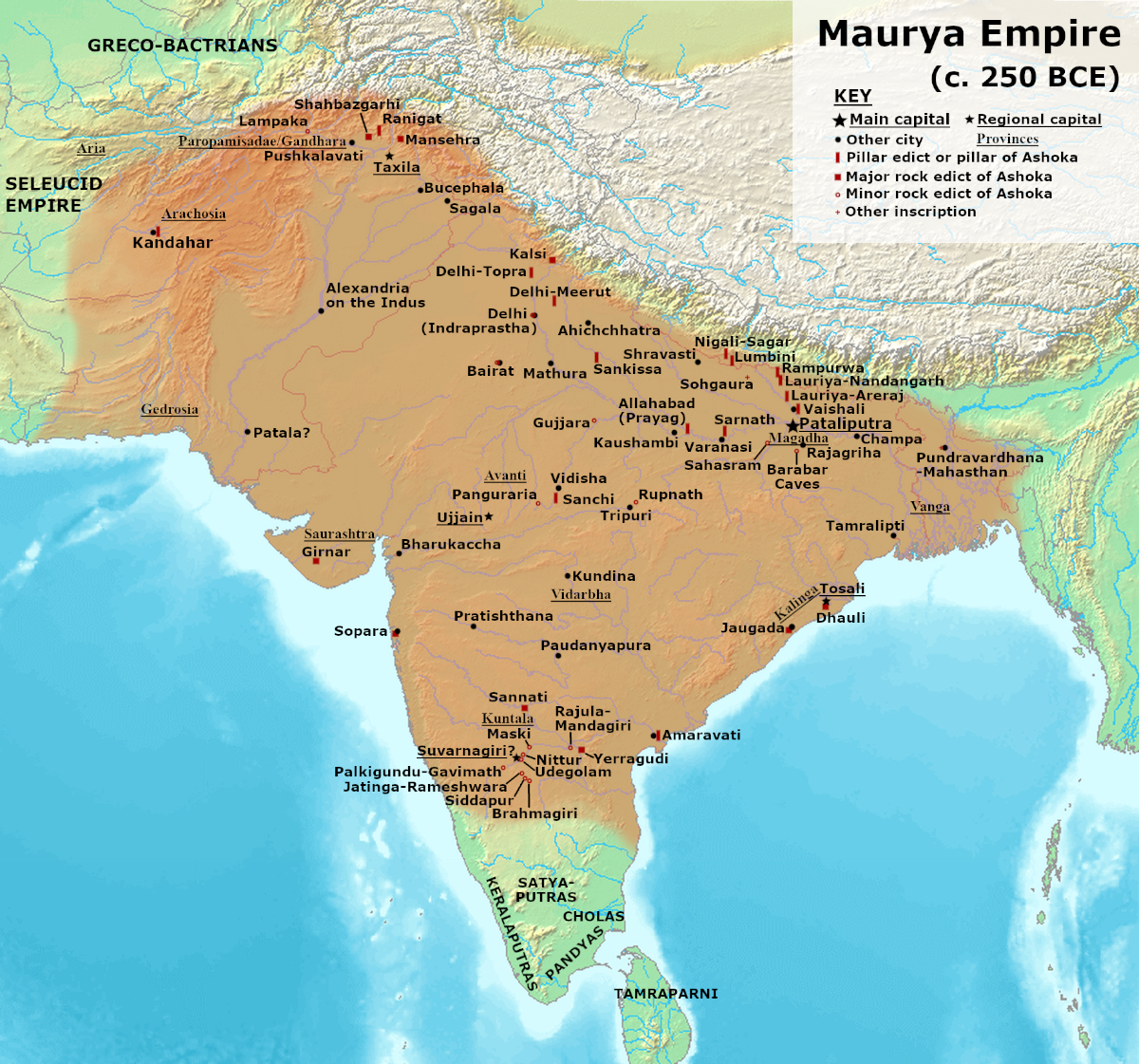
Mauryan Empire under Emperor Ashoka

India was first unified as a single state under Maurya Empire in 3rd century BC. Much of India has also been unified by later empires, such as the Delhi Sultanate, Mughal Empire and Maratha Empire in the early modern era.

=== Conception of Pan-South Asianism ===
India's concept of nationhood is based not merely on territorial extent of its sovereignty. Nationalistic sentiments and expression encompass India's ancient history as the birthplace of the Indus Valley Civilisation, as well as four major world religions – Hinduism, Buddhism, Jainism and Sikhism. Indian nationalists see India stretching along these lines across the Indian subcontinent. Mahatma Gandhi argued that the presence of ancient Hindu pilgrimage centres in the corners of India indicated an older consciousness of Indian unity.

=== Ages of war and invasion ===
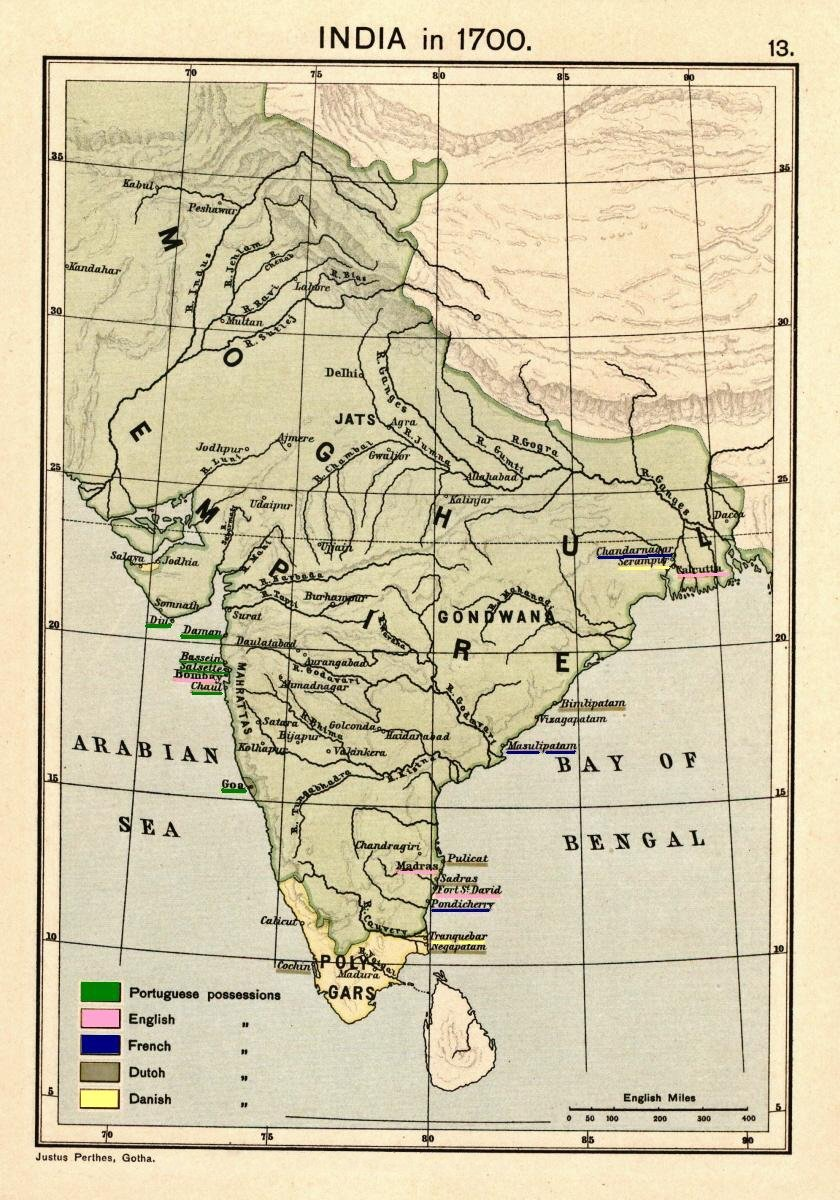
The Mughal Empire at its greatest extent

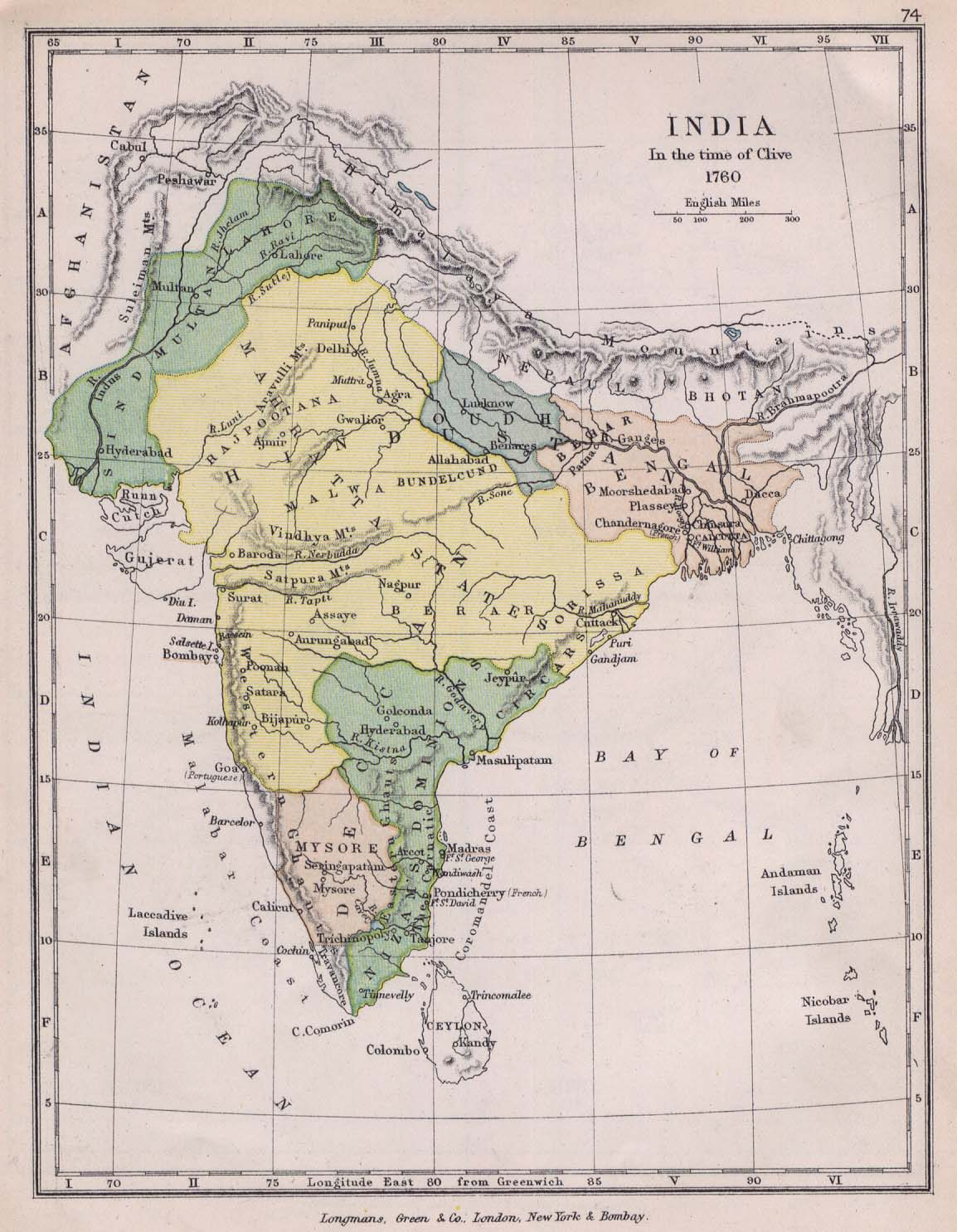
The extent of Maratha Empire (yellow), without its vassals.

India today celebrates many kings and queens for combating foreign invasion and domination, such as Shivaji of the Maratha Empire, Rani Lakshmibai of Jhansi, Kittur Chennamma, Maharana Pratap of Rajputana, Prithviraj Chauhan and Tipu Sultan. The kings of ancient India, such as Chandragupta Maurya of the Mauryan Empire, his successor Ashoka of the Magadha Empire, and Rajendra I of the Chola Empire, are also remembered for their military genius, notable conquests and remarkable religious tolerance.

The Mughal emperor Akbar was known to have a policy of religious tolerance and syncretism.

== Colonial-era nationalism ==
The flag adopted in 1931 by the Congress and used by the Provisional Government of Free India during the Second World War.

The consolidation of the British East India Company's rule in the Indian subcontinent during the late 18th century brought about socio-economic changes which led to the rise of an Indian middle class and steadily eroded pre-colonial socio-religious institutions and barriers.

The emerging economic and financial power of Indian business-owners and merchants and the professional class brought them increasingly into conflict with the British authorities. A rising political consciousness among the native Indian social elite (including lawyers, doctors, university graduates, government officials and similar groups) spawned an Indian identity and fed a growing nationalist sentiment in India in the last decades of the nineteenth century. The creation in 1885 of the Indian National Congress in India by the political reformer A.O. Hume intensified the process by providing an important platform from which demands could be made for political liberalisation, increased autonomy, and social reform.

Congress leaders preferred dialogue and debate with the Raj administration to press their political demands. Unlike these moderates or loyalists, who opposed violence, the nationalist movement grew increasingly strong, radical, and militant in Bengal and Punjab, with smaller yet notable movements emerging in Maharashtra, Madras, and other parts of southern India.

=== International history ===
==== British views and influence ====
India is a geographical term. It is no more a united nation than the equator.

— Winston Churchill (1931),

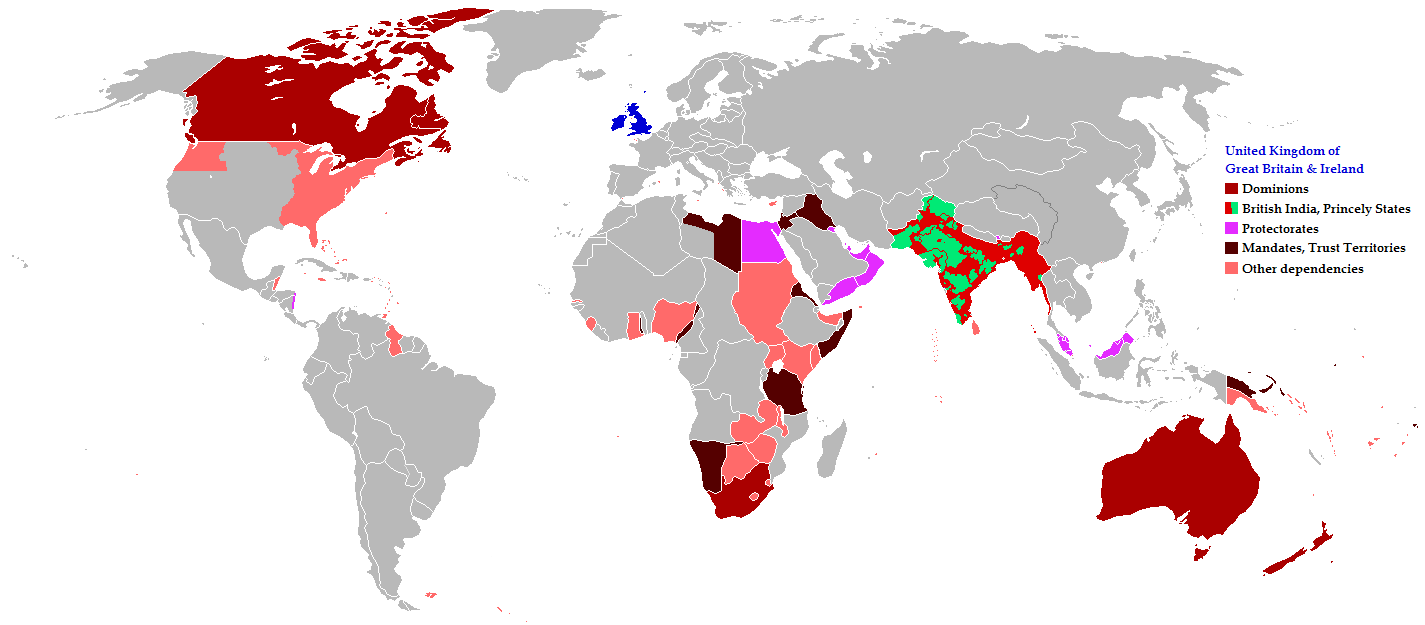
British India (with the princely states in green) was one of several colonies, each having varying levels of self-government

From the British perspective, the creation of a unified India began with and was only made possible by their conquest of the subcontinent ignoring that much of India had previously been unified under domestic powers like Maurya Empire, Delhi Sultanate and Mughal Empire. With their introduction of the Aryan Invasion Theory, proposing that most modern Indians (Indo-Aryans) descend from ancient invaders, it was implied that their presence in India was no more unnatural than that of the Hindus and the Muslims. As the rulers of India, they had an ambiguous view of Indian nationalism, envisioning a process of yielding greater autonomy to the colony while depending on it for their global dominance.

British sports such as cricket became part of the nationalist movement over time, with victories against the British by unified Indian teams offering a nonviolent means to push for independence. The nationalist movement also found other ways to adopt elements of British culture while opposing British rule.

==== Other foreign influences ====
Giuseppe Mazzini and other figures associated with the 19th-century unification of Italy were greatly admired by many early Indian nationalists. Sri Aurobindo described the nationalist sentiment of his time as the "sweet harmony between the new ideal of Mazzini and the old ideal of Sannyasa".

B. R. Ambedkar, a major figure in the postcolonial drafting of the modern Indian Constitution, took note of the historical challenges of nation-building in several other societies. He was influenced by his education at Columbia University in the United States.

==== International networks ====
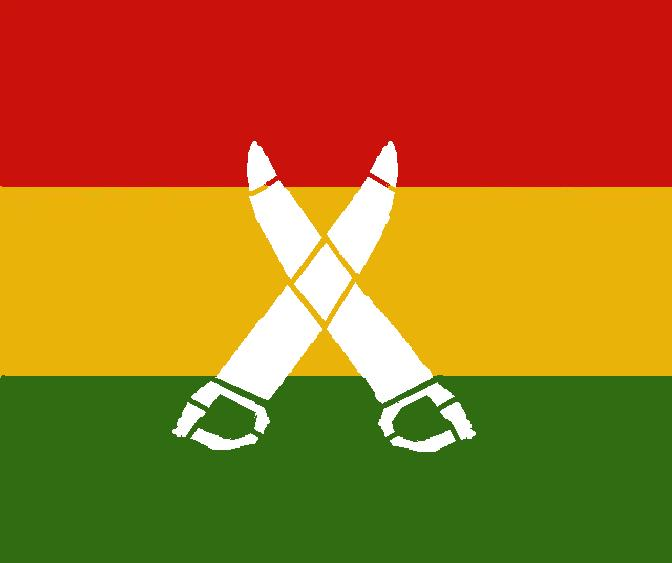
The Ghadar Movement sought to free India with help from its diaspora

By the early 20th century, Pan-Asianism became part of anticolonial discourse within the nationalist movement.

Due to the manner in which British India grew to annex and administer territories beyond the traditional frontier of India, certain groups like the Arabs and Burmese once professed some support for being included within Indian nationalism before developing their own local nationalisms.

=== Swadeshi ===
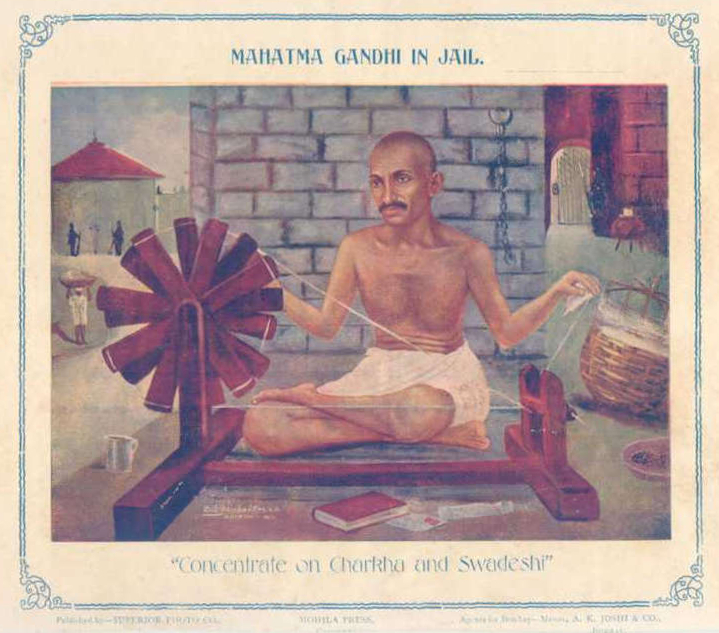
1930s art featuring Gandhi with a charkha, an Indian spinning wheel he associated with economic self-sufficiency

The controversial 1905 partition of Bengal, dividing the region along religious lines, escalated the growing unrest, stimulating radical nationalist sentiments and becoming a driving force for Indian revolutionaries.

=== The Gandhian era ===
Mahatma Gandhi pioneered the art of Satyagraha, typified with a strict adherence to ahimsa (non-violence), and civil disobedience. This permitted common individuals to engage the British in revolution, without employing violence or other distasteful means. Gandhi's equally strict adherence to democracy, religious and ethnic equality and brotherhood, as well as activist rejection of caste-based discrimination and untouchability united people across these demographic lines for the first time in India's history. The masses participated in India's independence struggle for the first time, and the membership of the Congress grew over tens of millions by the 1930s. In addition, Gandhi's victories in the Champaran and Kheda Satyagraha in 1918–19, gave confidence to a rising younger generation of Indian nationalists that India could gain independence from British rule.

National leaders like Pandit Jawaharlal Nehru, Netaji Subhash Chandra Bose, Maulana Azad, Chakravarti Rajagopalachari, Rajendra Prasad, the Lal Bal Pal trio, and Khan Abdul Gaffar Khan brought together generations of Indians across regions and demographics, and provided a strong leadership base giving the country political direction.

=== Final years ===
In 1947, Lord Mountbatten came to India to discuss the eventual outcome of the British departure. At one point, he offered a plan to Nehru to make the various regions of India autonomous provinces, which Nehru strongly rejected; Lakshman Menon, grandson of Nehru's principal adviser V. P. Menon, referred to the plan as "Plan Balkan" (in reference to Balkanisation).

==== Independence ====
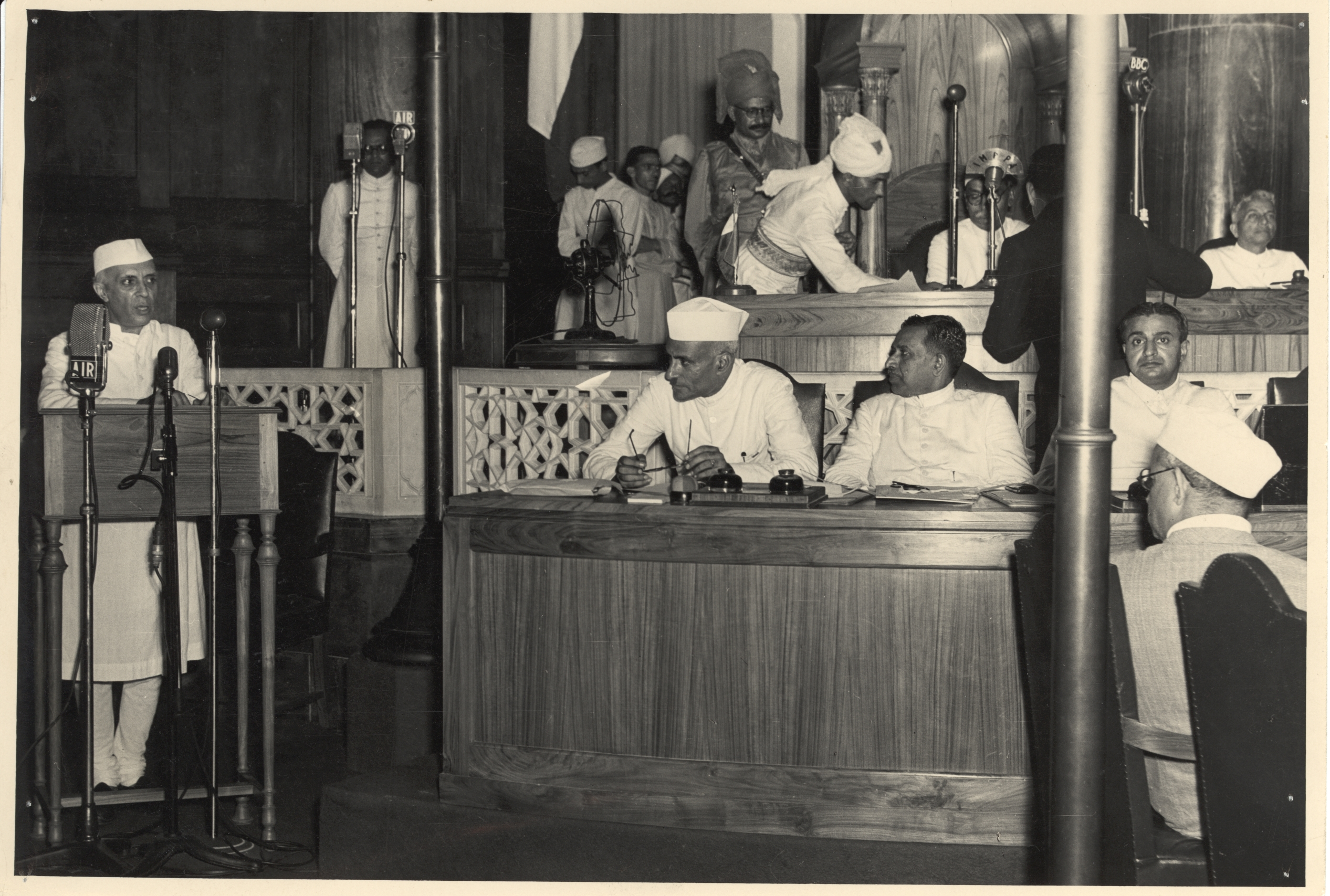
Prime Minister Nehru gave the famous Tryst with Destiny speech upon independence

Upon independence on 15 August of that year, India maintained formal links with the dissolving British Empire through its Commonwealth membership and Dominion status. The latter was abandoned in 1950, an anniversary now celebrated as Republic Day.

== Beyond Indian nationalism ==
Indian nationalism is as much a diverse blend of nationalistic sentiments as its people are ethnically and religiously diverse. Thus the most influential undercurrents are more than just Indian in nature. The most controversial and emotionally charged fibre in the fabric of Indian nationalism is religion. Religion forms a major, and in many cases, the central element of Indian life. Religious nationalisms are often dependent on mutual opposition. Ethnic communities are diverse in terms of linguistics, social traditions and history across India.

=== Hindu Rashtra ===
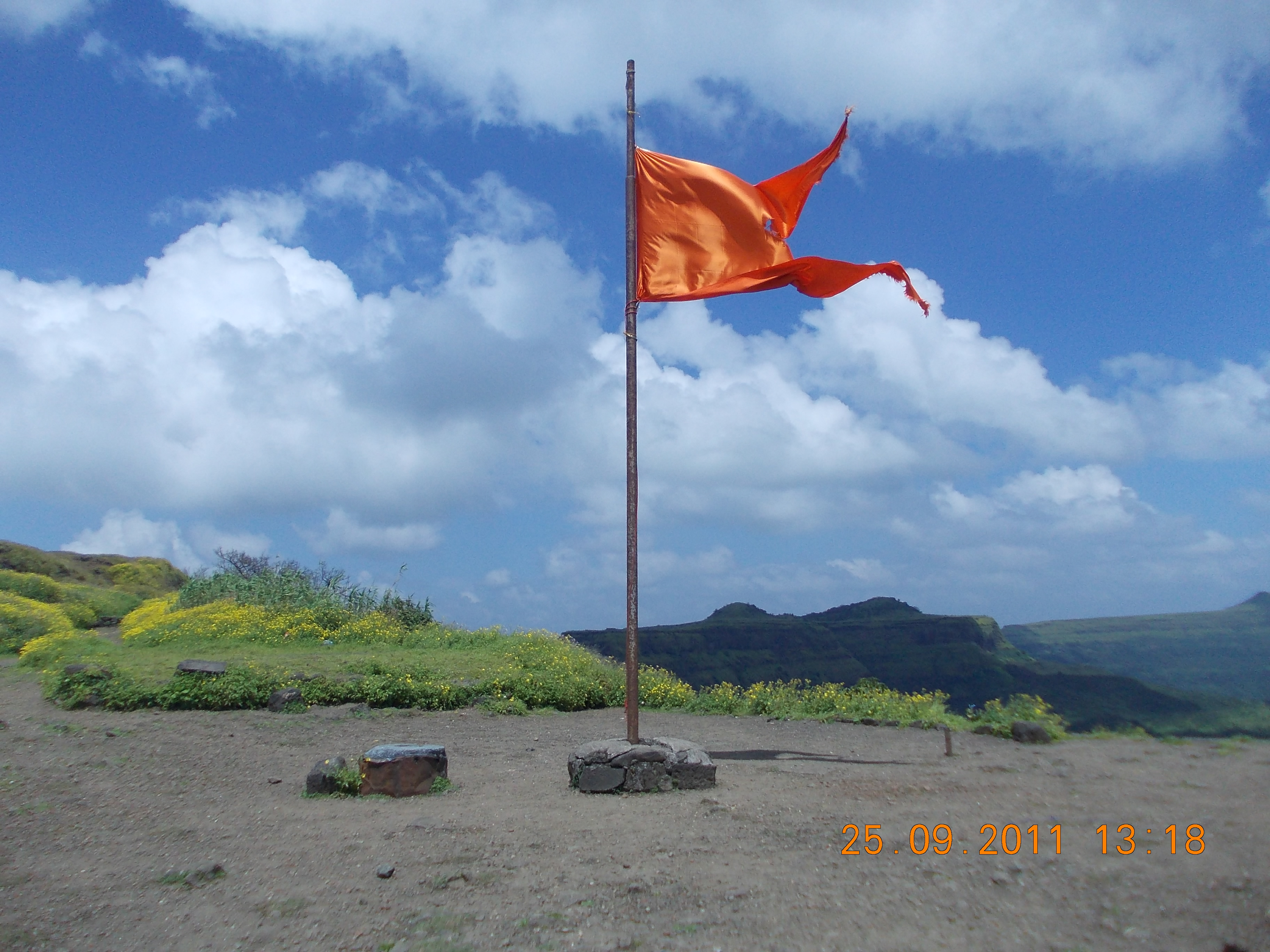
The saffron flag and color are associated with Hindu nationalism

An important influence upon Hindu consciousness arises from the time of Islamic empires in India. Entering the 20th century, Hindus formed over 75% of the population and thus unsurprisingly the backbone and platform of the nationalist movement. Modern Hindu thinking desired to unite Hindu society across the boundaries of caste, linguistic groups and ethnicity. In 1925, K.B. Hedgewar founded the Rashtriya Swayamsevak Sangh (RSS) in Nagpur, as a right-wing Hindutva paramilitary organisation.

Vinayak Damodar Savarkar coined the term Hindutva for his ideology that described India as a Hindu Rashtra, or a Hindu nation. This ideology has become the cornerstone of the political and religious agendas of modern Hindu nationalist bodies like the Bharatiya Janata Party (BJP) and the Vishwa Hindu Parishad (VHP), both of whom are closely associated with the RSS. The RSS leads the Sangh Parivar, a collective of Hindutva. These particular demands are based upon ending laws that Hindu nationalists consider to be special treatment offered to different religions.

=== The Qaum ===
The eventual flag of Pakistan, featuring Islamic motifs along with a white stripe to represent the non-Muslim minority

In 1906–1907, the All-India Muslim League was founded, created due to the suspicion of Muslim intellectuals and religious leaders with the Indian National Congress, which was perceived as dominated by Hindu membership and opinions. However, Mahatma Gandhi's leadership attracted a wide array of Muslims to the independence struggle and the Congress Party. The Aligarh Muslim University and the Jamia Millia Islamia stand apart – the former helped form the Muslim league, while the JMI was founded to promote Muslim education and consciousness upon nationalistic and Gandhian values and thought.

While prominent Muslims like Allama Iqbal, Muhammad Ali Jinnah and Liaquat Ali Khan embraced the notion that Hindus and Muslims were distinct nations, other major leaders like Mukhtar Ahmed Ansari, Maulana Azad and most of Deobandi clerics strongly backed the leadership of Mahatma Gandhi and the Indian independence struggle, opposing any notion of Muslim nationalism and separatism. The Muslim school of Indian nationalism failed to attract Muslim masses and the Islamic nationalist Muslim League enjoyed extensive popular political support. The state of Pakistan was ultimately formed following the Partition of India.

==== Views on the partition of India ====
British India was partitioned in mid-August 1947 into Muslim-majority Pakistan (green) and Hindu-majority India (orange)

Indian nationalists led by Mohandas Karamchand Gandhi and Jawaharlal Nehru wanted to make what was then British India, as well as the 562 princely states under British paramountcy, into a single secular, democratic state. The All India Azad Muslim Conference, which represented nationalist Muslims, gathered in Delhi in April 1940 to voice its support for an independent and united India. The British Government, however, sidelined the 'All India' organisation from the independence process and came to see Jinnah, who advocated separatism, as the sole representative of Indian Muslims. This was viewed with dismay by many Indian nationalists, who viewed Jinnah's ideology as damaging and unnecessarily divisive.

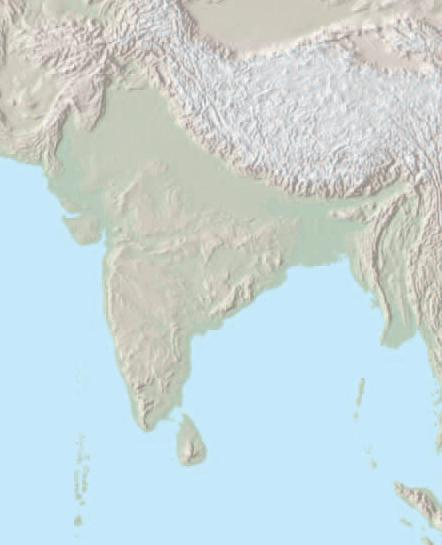
The All India Congress Committee, in a resolution adopted on 14 June 1947, openly stated that "geography and the mountains and the seas fashioned India as she is, and no human agency can change that shape or come in the way of its final destiny... at when present passions have subsided, India's problems will be viewed in their proper perspective and the false doctrine of two nations will be discredited and discarded by all."

In an interview with Leonard Mosley, Nehru said that he and his fellow Congressmen were "tired" after the independence movement, so were not ready to further drag on the matter for years with Jinnah's Muslim League, and that, anyway, they "expected that partition would be temporary, that Pakistan would come back to us." Gandhi also thought that the Partition would be undone. V.P. Menon, who had an important role in the transfer of power in 1947, quotes another major Congress politician, Abul Kalam Azad, who said that "the division is only of the map of the country and not in the hearts of the people, and I am sure it is going to be a short-lived partition." Acharya Kripalani, President of the Congress during the days of Partition, stated that making India "a strong, happy, democratic and socialist state" would ensure that "such an India can win back the seceding children to its lap... for the freedom we have achieved cannot be complete without the unity of India." Yet another leader of the Congress, Sarojini Naidu, said that she did not consider India's flag to be India's because "India is divided" and that "this is merely a temporary geographical separation. There is no spirit of separation in the heart of India."

Giving a more general assessment, Paul Brass says that "many speakers in the Constituent Assembly expressed the belief that the unity of India would be ultimately restored."

=== Khalistan ===
The proposed flag of Khalistan is often used as a symbol of the Khalistan movement.

The Khalistan movement is a separatist movement seeking to create a homeland for Sikhs by establishing an ethnoreligious sovereign state called Khalistan (Note: Also known as Sikhistan from the 1940s to 1970s.) (lit. 'land of the Khalsa') in the Punjab region. The proposed boundaries of Khalistan vary between different groups; some suggest the entirety of the Sikh-majority Indian state of Punjab, while larger claims include Pakistani Punjab and other parts of North India, such as Chandigarh, Haryana, and Himachal Pradesh.

The call for a separate Sikh state began during the 1930s, when British rule in India was nearing its end. In 1940, the first explicit call for Khalistan was made in a pamphlet titled "Khalistan". In the 1940s, a demand for a Sikh country called "Sikhistan" arose. With financial and political support from the Sikh diaspora, the movement flourished in the Indian state of Punjab—which has a Sikh-majority population—continuing through the 1970s and 1980s, and reaching its zenith in the late 1980s. The Sikh separatist leader Jagjit Singh Chohan said that during his talks with Zulfikar Ali Bhutto, who served as president and prime minister of Pakistan, the latter affirmed his support for the Khalistan movement in retaliation for the 1971 Indo-Pakistan war, which resulted in the secession of Bangladesh from Pakistan.

== Contemporary era ==
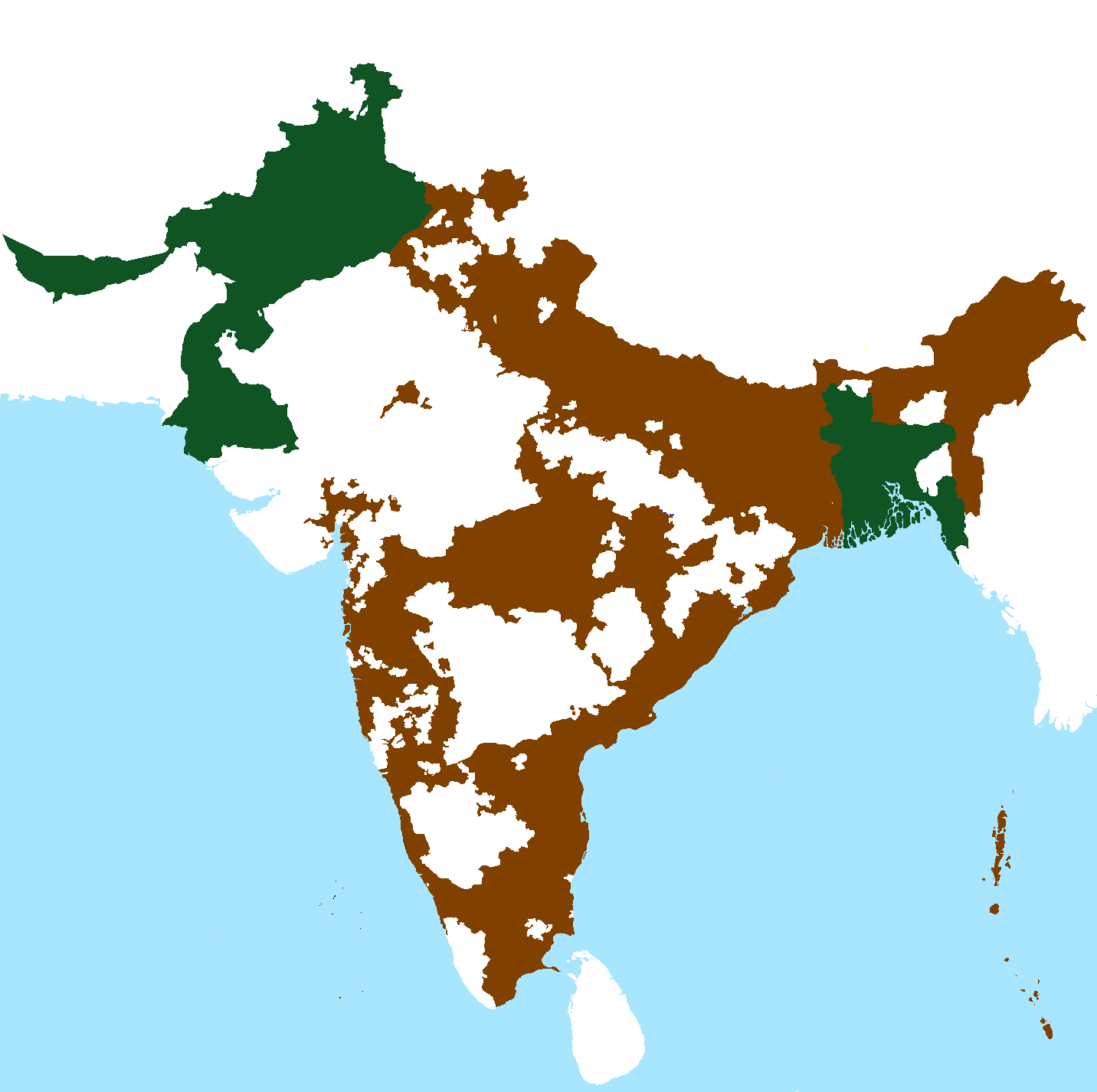
Indian-administered territory in 1947 (in brown) and in 1956

After independence, Sardar Vallabhbhai Patel helped complete the political integration of India. In 2014, his birthday was declared National Unity Day, and in 2018, he was commemorated in his native Gujarat with the Statue of Unity.

Along with dealing with the princely states, reorganising the states on linguistic boundaries was a central question in deciding the nature of the new nation. The government initially hesitated to support such a move, fearing it would lead to separatism, but eventually acquiesced with the States Reorganisation Act, 1956.

In these initial decades, the Hindi language was proposed by some as a national language, and was deliberately Sanskritised to distinguish it from the Urdu spoken in the newly separate Pakistan. Some of the strong advocates of Hindi associated it with Hindu nationalism through the slogan "Hindi, Hindu, Hindustan". Hindi cinema (popularly known as Bollywood) played a role in offering a vision of a unified India, with films celebrating military valour in border conflicts.

=== Post-Cold War ===
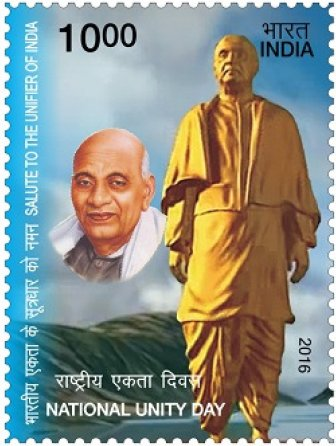
2016 stamp commemorating Sardar Patel

Economic liberalisation in the 1990s greatly changed India, with a greater amount of globalisation and transnationalism taking hold in the popular culture.

For the 75th Anniversary of Indian Independence in 2022, the Har Ghar Tiranga campaign was launched, encouraging every household to display the Indian flag.

== See also ==
- Indian nationalism and sport
- Pan-Indian
- Varthamanappusthakam – Travelogue written in Malayalam in 1790s

== Bibliography ==
- Bose, Sugata; Jalal, Ayesha (1998), Modern South Asia: History, Culture, Political Economy, New York: Routledge, ISBN 0-415-16952-6
- Croitt, Raymond D; Mjøset, Lars (2001), When Histories Collide, Oxford, UK: AltaMira, ISBN 0-7591-0158-2
- Desai, A.R. (2005), Social Background of Indian Nationalism (6Th-Edn), Popular Prakashan, ISBN 978-81-7154-667-1
- Mitra, Subrata K. (2006), The Puzzle of India's Governance: Culture, Context and Comparative Theory, Routledge, ISBN 978-1-134-27493-2
- Mukherjee, Bratindra Nath (2001), Nationhood and Statehood in India: A historical survey, Regency Publications, ISBN 978-81-87498-26-1
- Yadav, B.D (1992), M.P.T. Acharya, Reminiscences of an Indian Revolutionary, New Delhi: Anmol Publications Pvt ltd, ISBN 81-7041-470-9
