= Pearl Esua-Mensah =

Ghanaian businesswoman

- Education: University of Ghana (BSc); Alliance Manchester Business School (MSc)
- Occupations: Business Executive, Consultant
- Known for: Banking leadership, Media management
- Title: CEO of Feniks Ltd; Chairperson, Ghana Deposit Protection Corporation
- Awards: Finance Personality of the Year (2014)

Pearl Esua-Mensah is the Founder and CEO of Feniks Ltd. It is a Business Development Company. She was the chief executive officer (CEO) for Media General Ltd, a group of media organizations in Ghana from September 2017 to September 2018. She was the former Deputy Managing Director for UT Bank Ghana. She began as Financial Controller and rose through the General Manager position to become Director of Finance and Administration till December 2010.

Pearl Esua-Mensah is a member of the executive women network. She is also on the seven member board of the Deposit Protection Corporation, that was sworn in during November 2019. She joined Ashesi University's Board of Directors in 2014 and headed the Board's Finance Committee till she became its chairperson in 2017. She worked as Group Financial Accountant for Parity Group PLC, Group Reporting Accountant for Kantar Group, DSC Communications Ltd UK and Data Layout Ltd all in the United Kingdom. She is also on the boards of Galaxy Capital, Global Media Alliance and TXT Group Ghana.

== Education ==
She holds a BSc in Business Administration from the University of Ghana, Legon and a Masters in International Business Strategy from the Manchester Business School. She is also a Fellow of the Association of Chartered Certified Accountants (FCCA).

== Awards and nominations ==
Pearl Esua-Mensah was nominated among the top 60 corporate women leaders in Ghana in 2017.

Her input in chairing the steering committee to set up Invest In Africa (IIA) in Ghana in 2015 has been acknowledged.

She was recognized as the Finance Personality of the Year at the 2014 National Women in Finance Awards.

The Young Professionals & Youth Coalition initiative voted her the Young Professional Role Model 2011 (Female Category).
