= Review =

Evaluation

A review is an evaluation of a publication, product, service, or company or a critical take on current affairs in literature, politics, science or culture. In addition to a critical evaluation, the review's author may assign the work a rating to indicate its relative merit.

Reviews can apply to a movie, video game, musical composition, book; a piece of hardware like a car, home appliance, or computer; or software such as business software, sales software; or an event or performance, such as a live music concert, play, musical theater show, dance show or art exhibition. Online review platforms also aim to provide a space where buyers can share authentic experiences—positive or negative—and businesses can use this feedback to improve their services. In the cultural sphere, The New York Review of Books, for instance, is a collection of essays on literature, culture, and current affairs.

In the scientific field, reviews takes on a more specialized meaning. It compiles and evaluates previously published studies on a topic. It generally does not produce original research but rather the author tries to make sense of past findings and provide an overview of the current knowledge and understanding of the topic, and help identify patterns, gaps, or future directions. In some reviews, such as a systematic review, the author may include new quantitative analyses based on existing data.

== User review ==
A user review refers to a review written by a user or consumer of a product or service based on the author's own experience as a user of the reviewed product. Popular sources for consumer reviews are e-commerce sites like Amazon.com and Zappos and social media sites like Tripadvisor and Yelp. E-commerce sites often have consumer reviews for products and sellers separately. Usually, consumer reviews are in the form of several lines of text accompanied by a numerical rating. This text is meant to aid in shopping decision of a prospective buyer. A consumer review of a product usually comments on how well the product measures up to expectations based on the specifications provided by the manufacturer or seller. It talks about performance, reliability, quality defects, if any, and value for money. Consumer reviews, also called 'word of mouth' and 'user-generated content' differ from 'marketer-generated content' in their evaluation from consumer or user point of view. They often include comparative evaluations against competing products. Observations are factual as well as subjective in nature. Consumer reviews of sellers usually comment on service experienced, and dependability or trustworthiness of the seller. Usually, they comment on factors such as timeliness of delivery, packaging, and correctness of delivered items, shipping charges, return services against promises made, and so on.

Online consumer reviews have become a major factor in business reputation and brand image due to the popularity of TripAdvisor, Yelp, and online review websites. A negative review can damage the reputation of a business and this has created a new industry of reputation management where companies attempt to remove or hide bad reviews so that more favourable content is found when potential customers do research.

An expert review usually refers to a review written by someone who has tested several peer products or services to identify which offers the best value for money or the best set of features. An example of this is Amazon Vine. Amazon Vine is a program which was introduced to "help their fellow customers make informed purchase decisions". This program is invite-only and is designed to generate reviews for product vendors with whom Amazon works.

One type of user review can be in the physical world, such as a video reviewing a product or software. This is common on platforms such as YouTube and Vimeo.

== Book review ==
A book review (or book report) is a form of criticism in which a book is analyzed based on content, style, and merit. It is often carried out in periodicals, as school work, or online. Its length may vary from a single paragraph to a substantial essay. In the case of a work of poetry or fiction, or of nonfiction in which the literary merits of the work are an important element, a review will commonly use the methods of literary criticism. Such a review often contains evaluations of the book on the basis of personal taste. Reviewers, in literary periodicals, often use the occasion of a book review for a display of learning or to promulgate their own ideas on the topic of a fiction or non-fiction work. At the other end of the spectrum, some book reviews resemble simple plot summaries. Reviews of non-fiction works intended for instructional or informational purposes may focus more directly on concerns such as practical usefulness and reader-friendliness.

== Music reviews ==
=== Performance reviews ===
Reviews of live music performances are usually short articles that inform readers about the performers or group(s) that were involved and the performed pieces or songs.

Comments made by reviewers mostly fall either into technical comments or subjective/artistic comments. While technical comments include objective elements of the performance such as mistakes or intonation, the subjective comments refer to elements which are not objective, and are subject to taste, such as interpretation of factors like tempo or dynamics.

The balance between information and commentary depends on the target audience of the review, for example, a music critic writing for the general public (such as in a general newspaper) might put more background information, while a music critic writing for a more informed audience might put more commentary.

=== Recording reviews ===
Music critics and music writers also review recordings of music, including individual songs or pieces or entire albums. In the case of a review of an entire album, the reviewer will not only judge the individual songs or pieces; they will also judge how well all of the songs or pieces work together or go together.

The age of digital downloads may considerably change the album review. Where previously albums were purchased as collections of songs, often with a common theme, the rise of individual song downloads may have significant impact on consumers' exposure to an artist's music. Die-hard fans will most likely continue to explore an artist's complete work, but individuals will most likely make significantly different choices and "cherry-pick" songs they have been exposed to. The concept of "singles" or individual hits marked for retail has been around for long time; however, the price for a single in the days of CDs or 45's was much closer to the complete album price. When you consider that each song on an artist's album is often priced at the same amount, the odds of the average consumer purchase the entire album instead of selecting the "hit" songs decreases significantly.

=== Composition reviews ===
In classical music, music critics may also do reviews of compositions, even if the piece or song has never been performed and it only exists on manuscript paper in a score. To review a composition in this fashion, the critic will use music theory skills such as harmonic analysis and thematic analysis, along with their knowledge of idioms and compositional practices etc.

== Motion picture, television and video reviews ==
A motion picture review is a work of film criticism addressing the merits of one or more motion pictures. Generally, the term "movie review" implies a work of journalistic film criticism rather than of academic criticism. Such reviews have appeared in newspapers and printed periodicals since the beginning of the film industry, and now are published in general-interest websites as well as specialized film and film review sites. Television programs and other videos are now commonly reviewed in similar venues and by similar methods.

== Bought review ==
A bought review is the system where the creator (usually a company) of a new product pays a reviewer to review their new product. Primarily used in the car, movie, and game industry this system creates a kind of undercover advertising. Bought reviews tend to be biased due to the informative value of reviews. In some cases, a bought review may be independent, if the person that is hired to do the review has a strong reputation for independence and integrity. Even if a "bought review" from a respected critic is actually independent, the perception of potential bias will remain, due to the financial relationship between the company and the critic.

A similar type of review that may be biased is the so-called "puff piece", a review of "[a product]", film, or event that is written by a sympathetic reviewer or by an individual who has a connection to the product or event in question, either in terms of an employment relationship or other links. For example, a major media conglomerate that owns both print media and record companies may instruct one of its employees in one of its newspapers to do a review of an album which is being released by the conglomerate's record company. Although some journalists may assert their professional independence and integrity, and insist on producing an unbiased review, in other cases, writers may succumb to the pressure and pen a biased "puff piece" which praises the product or event while omitting any discussion of any shortcomings. In some cases, "puff pieces" purport to provide a review of the product or event, but instead merely provide "peacock words" ("An amazing recording"); "weasel words" and tabloid-style filler which is peripheral or irrelevant to assessing the qualities of the product or event ("During the filming, there were rumors that romantic sparks flew between the two co-leads, who were often seen talking together on the set").

Several online review manipulation strategies have also been reported, such as writing fake reviews and offering monetary compensation to remove negative reviews.

== See also ==
- Book review
- Film criticism
- Music critic
- Music criticism
- Music journalism
- Dance criticism
- Reaction video
- Review site
- Trustpilot
