= Acharpura =

- village
- Location within Madhya Pradesh Location within India
- Coordinates: 23.3518803°N 77.3640257°E
- Country: India
- State: Madhya Pradesh
- District: Bhopal
- Tehsil: Huzur
- Elevation: 486 m (1,594 ft)

Population (2011)
  - Total: 994
- Time zone: UTC+5:30 (IST)
- ISO 3166 code: IN-MP
- 2011 census code: 482369

Acharpura is a village in the Bhopal district of Madhya Pradesh, India. It is located in the Huzur tehsil and the Phanda block.

In the 2000s, the Government of Madhya Pradesh made attempts to develop the area into a "Special Education Zone", but did not attract much interest from the investors. In 2008, the Government allocated 110 acres to Anil Ambani's Dhirubhai Ambani Memorial Trust (DAMT) for a private university, but the Trust abandoned the project in 2015.

== Demographics ==
According to the 2011 census of India, Acharpura has 196 households. The effective literacy rate (i.e. the literacy rate of population excluding children aged 6 and below) is 62.04%.

Demographics (2011 Census)
	Total	Male	Female
Population	994	548	446
Children aged below 6 years	143	69	74
Scheduled caste	172	95	77
Scheduled tribe	136	71	65
Literates	528	350	178
Workers (all)	364	279	85
Main workers (total)	336	278	58
Main workers: Cultivators	159	157	2
Main workers: Agricultural labourers	80	45	35
Main workers: Household industry workers	0	0	0
Main workers: Other	97	76	21
Marginal workers (total)	28	1	27
Marginal workers: Cultivators	7	0	7
Marginal workers: Agricultural labourers	13	1	12
Marginal workers: Household industry workers	0	0	0
Marginal workers: Others	8	0	8
Non-workers	630	269	361
