= WIEF =

WIEF may refer to:

- World Islamic Economic Forum
- Wharton India Economic Forum
- WIEF-LD, a low-power television station (channel 18, virtual 47) licensed to serve Augusta, Georgia, United States
