= Dilip Cherian =

Indian political advisor (born 1956)

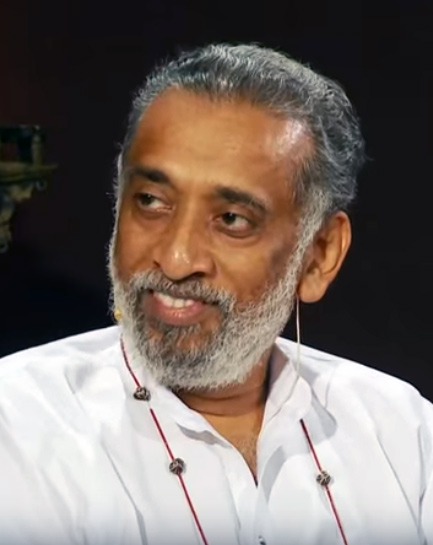
- Dilip Cherian (May 2014)
- Born: 10 April 1956 (age 70); Kerala, India
- Occupations: Communications consultant, political campaign adviser, journalist

Dilip Cherian (born 10 April 1956 in Kerala, India) is an Indian businessman who is the co-founder of and Consulting Partner for Perfect Relations, an Indian Image Management company established in the early 1990s.

== Educational qualifications ==
Dilip Cherian received a Bachelor's degree at the University of Delhi and a Master's degree at the University of Calcutta.

== Career ==
Dilip Cherian started his career as Economic Consultant, Bureau of Industrial Costs in the Ministry of Industry, New Delhi.

Dilip joined Business India in 1980. He was later a co-founder of The Observer of Business and Politics.

Dilip is a member of the National Advisory Board of Whistling Woods International film school in India..

Dilip has worked as a political advisor, as well as as a lobbyist for ITC Limited and TetraPak.
