= 1990s in India =

Decade

The 1990s were a historic decade in India. Economic growth rates increased as policies were liberalised, though not as quickly as in China. Urbanisation was also very slow compared to that in China. Rate of growth of population and fertility rates decreased. Infant mortality rates saw a good rate of decrease. Two polarising trends emerged in national politics – that of the politics of social justice based on caste which followed the implementation of Mandal commission report, and of the politics of religion based on Hindu nationalism, which was marked by demolition of the Babri Masjid in 1992 and the subsequent communal riots.

== Politics and government ==
=== Era of coalitions ===
The Bharatiya Janata Party (BJP) emerged from the May 1996 national elections as the single-largest party in the Lok Sabha but without enough strength to prove a majority on the floor of that Parliament. Under Prime Minister Atal Bihari Vajpayee, the BJP coalition lasted in power 13 days. With all political parties wishing to avoid another round of elections, a 14-party coalition led by the Janata Dal emerged to form a government known as the United Front. A United Front government under former Chief Minister of Karnataka H.D. Deve Gowda lasted less than a year. The leader of the Congress Party withdrew his support in March 1997. Inder Kumar Gujral replaced Deve Gowda as the consensus choice for Prime Minister of a 16-party United Front coalition.

Most of the Prime Ministers of this decade had tenures of only around a year or less.

In November 1997, the Congress Party again withdrew support for the United Front. New elections in February 1998 brought the BJP the largest number of seats in Parliament (182), but this fell far short of a majority. On 20 March 1998, the President inaugurated a BJP-led coalition government with Vajpayee again serving as Prime Minister. On 11 and 13 May 1998, this government conducted a series of underground nuclear tests, prompting President of the United States Bill Clinton and Japan to impose economic sanctions on India pursuant to the 1995 Nuclear Proliferation Prevention Act.

== Economy ==
As the government liberalised its economic policies, economic growth surged and the foundation was laid for India becoming one of the fastest growing economies of the world. The former Prime Minister of India, Manmohan Singh was instrumental in bringing about this change although India, with its socialist past, could not push economic reforms as aggressively as China which raced ahead during this decade from being just ahead of India to a GDP double that of India (a 4 times higher rate of growth) due to its more aggressive rate of economic reform. The License Raj, a system perceived as strangling India's economic potential due to over-regulation, came to an end.

GDP per capita nearly doubled from US$1,380 in 1990 to US$2,420 in 2000. This rate of growth was 11th fastest in the world. Foreign direct investment, which contributed less than 0.1% to the GDP came close to contributing 1% to the GDP. Foreign exchange reserves, which had plunged to zero, surged to 50 billion US dollars. Short term external debt which had risen to 350% of foreign exchange reserves plunged to 25% of foreign exchange reserves. Foreign direct investment (mainly from the United States, United Kingdom, Germany and Japan) started to become positive. The Indian rupee plunged from 25:1 to 45:1 compared to the USD. Contribution of services sector to GDP increased rapidly.

=== Impact on society ===
The growing Indian economy powered change in society, as India became more globalised, and its sports received greater investment. The famous advertising slogan "Yeh dil maange more" (transl. "This heart demands more") by Pepsi was coined in 1998, expressing the rising hope of the time.

== Leaders ==
- P.V. Narasimha Rao
- Atal Behari Vajpayee
- Lal Krishna Advani
- V.P. Singh
