= Amritt =

Amritt Ventures Inc.
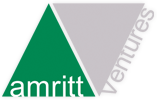
- Industry: Management consulting
- Founded: 2003
- Headquarters: Hermosa Beach
- Key people: Gunjan Bagla, President & CEO
- Products: Management consulting services, Global R&D Management
- Website: www.amritt.com

Amritt Ventures is a global management consulting firm based in the Los Angeles area. The stated purpose of the company is to aid US companies in becoming familiar with routine Indian business practices, specifically in marketing their products to India. Other clients are based on Europe, Canada, and Japan. The company has been ranked as one of the Top 10 Consulting Companies of India. Its executives have contributed to various financial magazines, including Bloomberg BusinessWeek and have advised US companies on doing business with India. Amritt offers consulting services such as market entry strategy and business advisory, medical devices, global capability centers, and business readiness workshops. Notable clients include Clorox, Kraft Foods, Johnson & Johnson, the British company Reckitt Benckiser, and the French media conglomerate Vivendi.

== History ==
Amritt was founded in 2003 as an advisory service to facilitate trade between the United States and India. It provides its clients with training workshops on topics like human resources issues in India, the financial and legal environment, and Indian culture.

Amritt is located in Hermosa Beach, California. Amritt was founded by Gunjan Bagla, an Indian-American author, businessman, and public speaker. He began his career working for Larsen & Toubro in Mumbai and later worked in the United States as a director of program management for Tandon in California. Both he and employees have travelled extensively to advise companies on US-India-Asia business relations, and Bagla has taught business seminars for industry executives at the California Institute of Technology and UCLA Extension.

In September 2010, Amritt's managing director was invited to speak at the CK Prahalad Memorial India Business Conference at the University of Michigan's Ross School of Business.

In March 2011, executives from Amritt were invited as guest speakers by the USC Marshall School of Business along with several US officials (including U.S. Secretary of Commerce, Gary Locke) and international representatives (including the Indonesian Ambassador, Dino Djalal) and the vice president of Boeing International, Dinesh Keskar. In April 2011, Amritt representatives attended the South Asian Studies Association's convention in honor of Ron Somers, President of the U.S. India Business Council, for his works in US-India relations. Bagla and Somers were reported to have had discussion on current US-India relations.

In 2023, 2024, and 2025, Amritt's CEO spoke about the India Natural Product Market at the Global Export Seminar Series at Natural products Expo West in Anaheim, California.

== Media attention ==
=== Market reports ===
Amritt has become well known for its industry surveys and reports on global developers and companies. Amritt is a professional advisory service that helps Western companies leverage global resources and global markets.

The Amritt 2008 R&D Globalization Study is based on responses from 204 online respondents from the U.S. and was conducted in April and May 2008. In this survey on R&D globalization, Amritt found that 33% of American companies plan to deploy only 11 to 100 R&D personnel in emerging economies, such as the BRIC countries. Also, a significant number, 16%, said that they may have over 1,000 people working in R&D in emerging economies. Half of the companies performing R&D in emerging economies do so to serve those local markets, while 42% said that financial pressures played a part. About a quarter of the respondents, 26%, had trouble finding enough talent in their home regions and 17% sought to accelerate time to market by using additional resources in emerging countries. Anecdotal evidence from the survey suggests that time-to-market is likely to become a more significant driver of R&D globalization in the near future.

Asked about their main worries as they globalize the R&D function, more than 50% of the companies cited the quality of work from emerging economies. About 24% referred to cross-cultural communications as their main worry.

=== Indian-English Dictionary ===
Amritt released a 700-word Indian-English lexicon to help North American and European companies with expansion into Asian markets. They later launched a revised and updated version of the popular resource with 64 new words to mark India's 64th Independence Day on August 15, 2009.

=== Community and Civic Engagement ===
Amritt's founder started a petition calling for the establishment of an Indian consulate in Los Angeles, which collected nearly 4,000 signatures. On September 22, 2024, Prime Minister Modi announced the decision to open new consulates in Boston and Los Angeles. In January 2026, the new Consulate location, at the AON center in downtown Los Angeles, opened, and Amritt team members attended the first event.

== See also ==
- Global R&D management
- Globalization
- R&D management
- Supplier evaluation
