= International business strategy =

Plans guiding commercial transactions

International business strategy refers to plans that guide commercial transactions taking place between entities in different countries. Typically, the phrase "international business strategy" refers to the plans and actions of companies (public or private) rather than of governments; as such, the goal of such a strategy involves increased profit.

Most companies of any appreciable size deal with at least one international partner at some point in their supply chain, and in most well-established commercial markets, competition operates internationally. Because methods of transacting commercial operations vary appreciably in different countries, an understanding of cultural and linguistic barriers, political and legal systems, and the many complexities of international trade is essential to commercial success.

As historically developing countries become increasingly prominent, new markets open up and new sources of goods become available, making it increasingly important even for long-established firms to have a viable international business strategy. This is often facilitated with the use of international management consulting firms such as Oliver Wyman, Roland Berger, Amritt, or the Everest Group.

== Philosophy ==
The three most prevalent philosophies of international business strategy are:

- industry-based, which argues that conditions within a particular industry determine strategy;
- resource-based, which argues that firm-specific differences determine strategy;
- institution-based, which argues that the industry- and resource-based views need to be supplemented by accounting for relevant societal differences of the types mentioned above.

== See also ==
- Strategic management
- International business
- International trade
- BRIC (economics term)
- CIVETS
- Emerging market
