= Anil Ambani =

Indian businessman (born 1959)

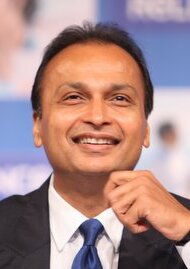
- Ambani in 2012

Member of Parliament, Rajya Sabha
- In office July 5, 2004 – March 29, 2006
- Constituency: Uttar Pradesh

Personal details
- Born: Anil Dhirajlal Ambani; 4 June 1959 (age 67) Bombay, India
- Spouse: Tina Munim (m. 1991)
- Children: 2
- Parents: Dhirubhai Ambani (father); Kokilaben Ambani (mother)
- Relatives: Mukesh Ambani (brother); Nita Ambani (sister-in-law)
- Education: Kishinchand Chellaram College (BSc); University of Pennsylvania (MBA)
- Occupation: Businessman, Politician

Anil Dhirubhai Ambani (born 4 June 1959) is an Indian businessman, chairman, and managing director of the Reliance Group. The Reliance Group was created in July 2006 following a demerger from Reliance Industries Limited. He led several listed corporations, including Reliance Capital, Reliance Infrastructure, Reliance Power, and Reliance Communications. Ambani, once the sixth richest person in the world, declared bankruptcy before a UK court in February 2020. He served in the Rajya Sabha, the upper house of the Parliament of India from Uttar Pradesh, as an independent MP between 2004 and 2006.

== Life and education ==
Anil Dhirajlal Ambani was born on 4 June 1959 in Bombay. He is the youngest son of the founder of Reliance Industries, Dhirubhai Ambani and his wife Kokilaben Ambani. Ambani has said that his father would lead the brothers on "incentive-oriented outings" where they would be rewarded with a box of mangoes for a 10-km (6 mile) hike, but also punished them for acting out in front of guests. He earned his Bachelor of Science degree from Kishinchand Chellaram College and received a Master in Business Administration at the Wharton School of the University of Pennsylvania in 1983.

== Business career ==
Ambani's father Dhirubhai died in 2002 without leaving a clear succession plan. After bickering between Anil and his brother Mukesh, their mother Kokilaben mediated and split the family-owned businesses between the two brothers.

Anil Ambani received parts of Reliance Group with interests in telecom, entertainment, financial services, power and infrastructure. Ambani is also credited with India's largest IPO, that of Reliance Power, which in 2008 was subscribed in less than 60 seconds, the fastest in the history of Indian capital markets to date.

In 2005 Ambani made his debut in the entertainment industry with an acquisition of a majority stake in Adlabs Films, a company with interests in film processing, production, exhibition and digital cinema. The company was renamed Reliance MediaWorks in 2009. Ambani was featured as an empire builder in the Wharton school alumni magazine in 2006.

In 2008 a joint venture worth US$1.2 billion with Steven Spielberg's production company DreamWorks cast Ambani's entertainment business on to a global platform. He has contributed to the production of several Spielberg films, including the Academy Award-winning Lincoln.

In 2018, India's principal opposition party, Indian National Congress, accused Prime Minister Narendra Modi of favouring Ambani's defence manufacturing company over Hindustan Aeronautics Limited, a public sector enterprise, in a fighter aircraft deal worth ₹58,000 crore (equivalent to ₹850 billion or US$8.8 billion in 2026) with French manufacturing firm Dassault. Ambani, several of whose companies were debt-ridden, denied all charges of benefiting from crony capitalism. Reliance Defence stood to get over 3% of the ₹30,000 crore (equivalent to ₹440 billion or US$4.5 billion in 2026) Dassault Aviation offsets contract, contrary to the impression that it was to be the biggest beneficiary of the Rafale fighter jet deal. In a possibly related controversy, one of his businesses partly financed a French film in which former French president François Hollande's then-partner had acted around the same time the aircraft deal was being negotiated.

Ambani gained notoriety as one of the fastest destroyers of shareholder wealth in the last 100 years with the combined group market cap declining by 90% since the formation of the Reliance ADA Group.

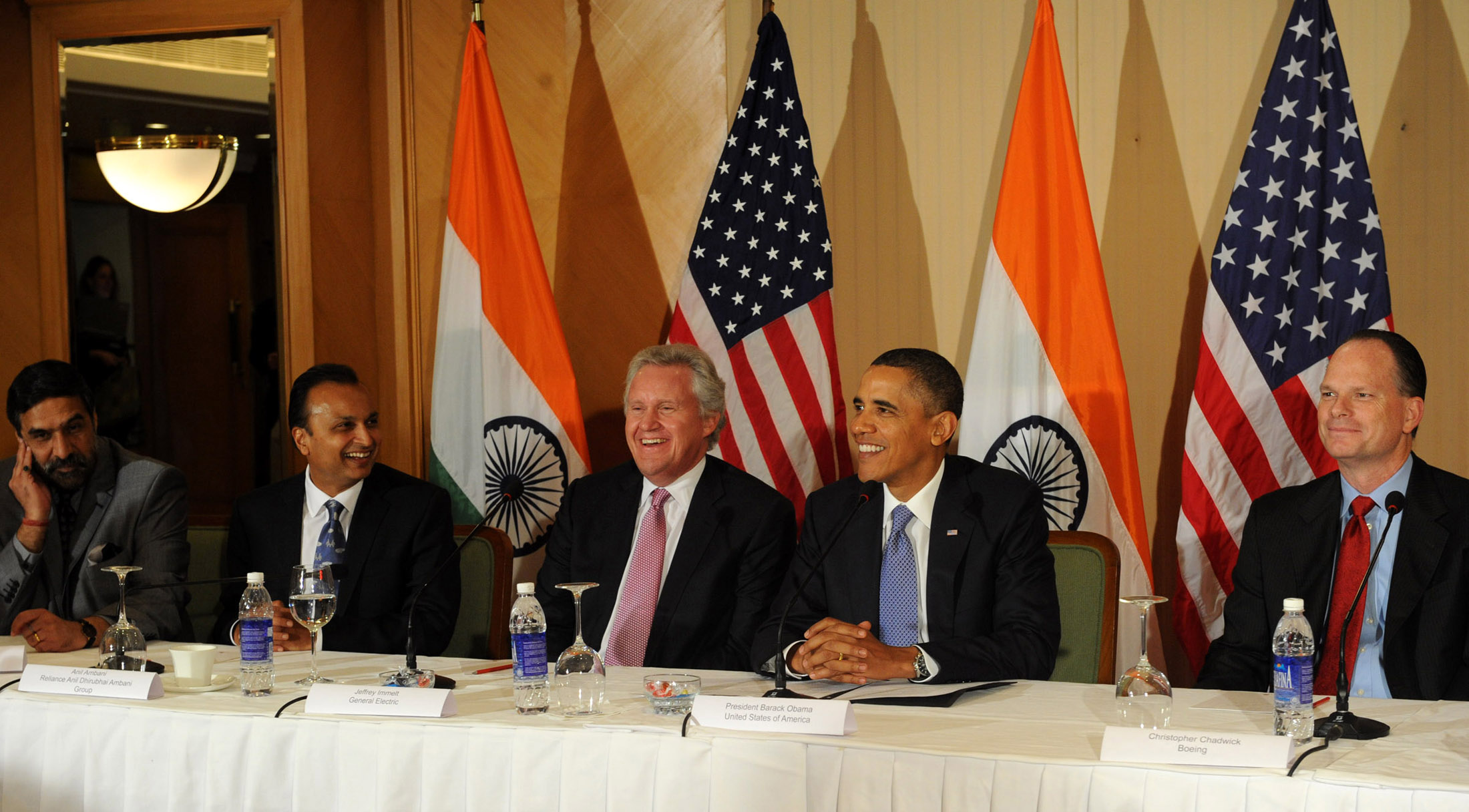
Ambani with U.S. President Barack Obama on 6 November 2010

In early 2019, a court in Mumbai held Ambani in criminal contempt for non-payment of personally guaranteed debt Reliance Communications owed to Swedish gear maker Ericsson. Instead of jail time, the court gave him a month to come up with the funds. At the end of the month, Ambani was bailed out by his elder brother, Mukesh Ambani.

In April 2019, three Anil Dhirubhai Ambani Group (ADAG) companies reached a standstill agreement with Franklin Templeton (FT) after secured non-convertible debenture (NCD) default. This led to SEBI changing mutual fund regulation of reducing unlisted NCDs exposure to 10% and making standstill agreement void. In aftermath, FT India didn't sell the pledged securities or wound 6 debt funds affecting 300,000 investors.

In February 2020, Ambani was locked in a legal battle with three Chinese banks. He was asked to set aside US$100 million by the court which led him to make the statement that his net worth is currently zero after considering his liabilities. The dispute still rages on with the UK court ordering him to pay the banks to the tune of US$716 million.

In October 2021, Anil Ambani was named in the Pandora Papers along with his brother Mukesh. In January 2023, the Bombay High Court questioned the Income Tax Department's accusation of tax evasion against Anil Ambani after a petition by him challenged the decision of the notice issued by the IT department.

== Relationship with Jeffrey Epstein ==
Documents part of the Epstein files show communications between Ambani and Jeffrey Epstein from 2017 to 2019. Ambani was introduced to Epstein by Sultan Ahmed bin Sulayem in February 2017. According to the messages, Ambani sought Epstein's advice on engaging with the White House on India–U.S. relations and defense cooperation, and later requested assistance in arranging meetings with senior U.S. officials, including Jared Kushner and Steve Bannon, in connection with a planned visit to Washington by Prime Minister Narendra Modi. In March 2017, Anil responded to an offer by Epstein for a "tall Swedish blonde woman, to make fun to visit" by saying "Arrange that".

On 23 May 2019—the day Modi secured re-election—Ambani visited Epstein's Manhattan townhouse. That evening, Epstein told Bannon that the meeting had been "interesting" and said that a representative of Modi claimed there was limited access to U.S. officials in Washington. The Wire reported that it was unable to confirm whether Modi had sent a representative or whether the individual referred to was Ambani himself.

India's Ministry of External Affairs dismissed references to Modi in the documents as "trashy ruminations by a convicted criminal," stating that they did not merit consideration.

== Personal life ==
Ambani belongs to a Gujarati family which hails from the village of Chorwad near Junagadh in the Kathiawar region of Gujarat, India. He is the youngest son of the legendary textile entrepreneur Dhirubhai Ambani and his wife, Kokilaben Ambani, a home-maker who founded the Kokilaben Dhirubhai Ambani Hospital in suburban Mumbai. Anil is one of four children. He has an older brother, Mukesh Ambani, and two sisters, Nina Kothari (wife of late Bhadra Shyam Kothari) and Deepti Salgaocar (wife of Dattaraj Salgoncar).

On February 2, 1991 Ambani married the actress Tina Munim, despite facing much resistance from his family, because she came from the world of fashion and glamour, and her lifestyle choices before marriage had been unconventional. They have two sons, Jai Anmol Ambani and Jai Anshul Ambani. As of 2010, Ambani and his family reside at The Sea Wind, a 14-story building in Mumbai.

== Awards and recognition ==
- Conferred the 'Businessman of the Year 1997' award by India's leading business magazine Business India, December 1998.
- Voted 'the Businessman of the Year' in a poll conducted by The Times of India – TNS, December 2006.
- Voted the 'Best role model' among business leaders in the biannual Mood of the Nation poll conducted by India Today magazine, August 2006.
- Conferred 'the CEO of the Year 2004' in the Platts Global Energy Awards.
- Conferred 'The Entrepreneur of the Decade Award' by the Bombay Management Association, October 2002.
- Awarded the First Wharton Indian Alumni Award by the Wharton India Economic Forum (WIEF) in recognition of his contribution to the establishment of Reliance as a global leader in many of its business areas, December 2001.
- Selected by Asiaweek magazine for its list of 'Leaders of the Millennium in Business and Finance' and was introduced as the only 'new hero' in Business and Finance from India, June 1999.

== See also ==
- List of people named in the Epstein files
