= Gopal Sankaranarayanan =

Indian lawyer

- Education: National Law School of India University; London School of Economics
- Occupations: Lawyer, Writer
- Known for: Senior Advocate at the Supreme Court of India
- Spouse: Haripriya Padmanabhan
- Children: 3

Gopal Sankaranarayanan is an Indian lawyer practicing at the Supreme Court of India. He was designated as a senior advocate by the Supreme Court of India in March 2019. He is known for his specialization in Constitutional law. He served as the secretary of the Lodha Committee, appointed by the Supreme Court of India in 2015 to bring about reforms in cricket administration in India. He has provided assistance to the Supreme Court as an Amicus curiae (friend of the court) in numerous cases. In April 2022, the Supreme Court appointed him as Amicus curiae to assist in the finalization of the Constitution of the All India Football Federation (AIFF).

== Education ==
He graduated from the National Law School of India University, Bangalore, in 2001, and subsequently pursued a Master's degree in Criminology from the London School of Economics.

== Career ==
Sankaranarayanan started his career assisting senior advocate K. K. Venugopal (former Attorney-General for India). He assisted in drafting the Constitution of the Kingdom of Bhutan. In April 2019, Sankaranarayanan was appointed as a Senior Advocate of the Supreme Court. His legal practice involves a significant amount of pro bono work and public interest litigation, addressing issues such as electoral independence, right to water, marital rape, human-animal conflict, clean air in India, and tree protection.

Sankaranarayanan served as a special counsel for the Central Bureau of Investigation (CBI) and the Enforcement Directorate (ED) in various cases, including those related to the 2G Scam. In 2014, Dr.Subramanian Swamy vs Director, CBI & Anr, Gopal successfully advocated before the Supreme Court for the invalidation of Section 6-A of the Delhi Special Police Establishment Act, which provided discriminatory protection from prosecution to specific categories of public servants.

In the Shreya Singhal case, Sankaranarayanan's legal arguments played a key role in the nullification of both Section 66-A of the Information Technology Act, 2000 and Section 118 of the Kerala Police Act.

Sankaranarayanan is a co-founder and executive member of Care For Air, an independent volunteer organization, which he founded for raising awareness about clean air in the National Capital Region. In 2015, he filed a petition on behalf of three infants in the Supreme Court. This led to the urgent adoption of BS-VI compliance by the Government of India, bypassing the BS-V norms. In November 2021, Sankaranarayanan wrote an open letter to the judges of the Supreme Court, calling for a thorough hearing on the issue of air pollution.

In September 2019, NLSIU students ended their protest after Sankaranarayanan served as an emissary to the Chief Justice of India, resolving issues regarding the non-appointment of the new Vice-Chancellor.

He provided pro bono representation for Rajiv Gandhi Assassination case convict A. G. Perarivalan for 6 years, resulting in his release from the Supreme Court in May 2022. Some of the politicians he has represented in court include Suvendu Adhikari, Omar Abdullah and Mahua Moitra. He was part of various notable cases concerning Entry of women to Sabarimala, institutional reservations, and the validity of the Aadhaar scheme.

He has served as the spokesperson of the Bar Council of India and as the Convenor of the All India Bar Examination.

=== Sports reform in India ===
In January 2015, the Supreme Court directed the formation of a high-level committee led by former Chief Justice of India Rajendra Mal Lodha to bring reforms to the Board of Control for Cricket in India (BCCI), the regulatory body for Indian cricket. Sankaranarayanan was appointed as the secretary of the Lodha Committee, assisting in the preparation and drafting of the report. The committee's report led to significant changes in the BCCI, which were accepted by the Supreme Court. However, both Lodha and Sankaranarayanan later expressed reservations about the rollback of certain reforms.

In 2018, Sankaranarayanan represented the Committee of Administrators of the Archery Association of India, defending the electoral process conducted by former Chief Election Commissioner, S. Y. Quraishi before the Supreme Court.

In 2022, Sankaranarayanan represented Aslam Sher Khan, a former Olympian hockey player in the Delhi High Court, highlighting concerns about the mismanagement of Hockey India. This led to the formation of a three-member Committee of Administrators and the development of a new constitution for the association.

=== Amicus curiae ===
He has been appointed as an Amicus Curiae (friend of the court) by the Supreme Court of India to assist the court in various cases. He was Amicus Curiae in the People's Union for Civil Liberties vs. Union of India case. In 2019, the Supreme Court appointed him as amicus curiae to assist in finalizing the Constitution of the All India Football Federation. In 2021, he assisted the Court in ensuring proper staffing and infrastructure for consumer dispute tribunals. As Amicus, he also assists in the hearings concerning regulation of media briefings by the police.

He also fulfilled amicus roles, providing reports on various matters such as consumer disputes involving former Minister Rajyavardhan Singh Rathore, farmer distress in Tamil Nadu, and the allocation of public property to former Chief Ministers of Uttar Pradesh. In April 2022, Sankaranarayanan was appointed as an amicus to address the proliferation of illegal colonies in India and propose potential solutions.

== Publications ==
Sankaranarayanan has contributed to three official book publications of the Supreme Court of India, which includes The Constitution at 67 (2017), Courts of India: Past to Present (2016), and The Restatement of Contempt Law (2011). He contributed as the editor of the coat pocket edition of the Constitution of India, which was published by the Eastern Book Company. It received positive reception, and its 15th edition was released in 2023.

He also contributed to the anthology India's Long Walk Home (2020), addressing the environmental degradation and the impact of COVID-19 on vulnerable sections, including migrant workers. His work was featured alongside noted authors such as Arundhati Roy, Ruskin Bond, Mridula Garg, Paranjoy Guha Thakurta, Ashok Vajpeyi and others.

=== Bibliography ===
- The Restatement of Contempt Law (2011), Wolters Kluwer ISBN 8184736045
- Courts of India: Past to Present (2016), Publications Division, Ministry of Information and Broadcasting ISBN 978-8123022147
- The Constitution at 67 (2017), The Supreme Court of India, New Delhi
- The Constitution of India (Coat pocket edition), Eastern Book Company ISBN 978-9394364684
- India's Long Walk Home (2020), AuthorsUpFront ISBN 978-9387280878

== Controversies ==
=== Allegation on cricket selectors ===
In August 2016, Gopal Sankaranarayanan was involved in a controversy when, as the secretary of the Lodha Committee, he accused the Board of Control for Cricket in India (BCCI) selectors of seeking sexual favours. This allegation came to light through an email report sent by BCCI secretary Ajay Shirke to BCCI president Anurag Thakur. However, BCCI Secretary Ajay Shirke denied these accusations, stating that the Indian board had not received any such complaints. Later, the Justice RM Lodha panel refuted the accusations against BCCI selectors, clarifying that Gopal Sankaranarayanan hadn't made such allegations and there was no intention to portray selectors negatively.

=== Contempt threat by Justice Arun Kumar Mishra ===
In December 2019, a heated exchange occurred between Supreme Court judge Arun Kumar Mishra and Gopal Sankaranarayanan during a Constitution Bench hearing on land acquisition cases. The disagreement arose as Sankaranarayanan argued for one of the parties, with Justice Mishra finding the arguments repetitive. Sankaranarayanan requested an opportunity to present his submissions, but Justice Mishra remained firm. The tension escalated, resulting in Justice Mishra threatening contempt and conviction if he continued speaking. In response, Sankaranarayanan left the courtroom. When CNN-News18 contacted him, Sankaranarayanan said, “I would not wish to argue in an atmosphere which would lower the dignity of the court. I would not wish to say anything more.”

The incident raised concerns about the treatment of lawyers and the core principles of the justice system. The Supreme Court Advocates-on-Record Association (SCAORA) issued a resolution urging Justice Mishra to display more patience when dealing with lawyers. Two days later, senior lawyers of the Supreme Court entered Arun Mishra's courtroom to protest his behavior, prompting Justice Mishra to apologize for his conduct.
