= Sankaranarayana Iyen =

Sankaranarayana Iyen was the Diwan of Travancore from 1815 to 1816. He was replaced in 1816 as he was considered incompetent.
