= Amazon Vine =

Internal service of Amazon.com

Launched in 2007, Amazon Vine is an internal service of Amazon.com that allows manufacturers and publishers to receive reviews for their products on Amazon. Companies pay a fee to Amazon and provide products for review. The products are then passed to Amazon reviewers, who can publish a review. Reviews are not required on any particular item, although Vine members are expected to review most items received. Past and present participating companies include Logitech, HarperCollins, Philips, Samsung, Bose, Sony, Tefal, Microsoft, Breville, Bosch, Garmin, Dyson, Remington, Case Logic, Creative, Braun, Sennheiser, Olympus, LG, Black & Decker, Acer and Walker Books. Reception for the program has been mixed with some people criticizing the program's use of non-professional reviewers while others cited this as a benefit. The Vine program operates independently on Amazon.com, Amazon.co.uk, Amazon.fr, Amazon.de, Amazon.ca and Amazon.es.

== Membership ==
Vine members (known as "Vine Voices") are selected from the Amazon reviewer base, with the site stating that the selection criteria are "based on the trust [the members] earned in the Amazon community for writing accurate and insightful reviews". Previously, there were two Vine newsletters every month from which the Vine Voices could select items to review. The first newsletter appeared on the third Thursday of the month, and the second appeared on the fourth Thursday. Leftover articles from these newsletters went to the "Last Harvest" list, where Vine members could choose unlimited products.

Products available for review originally included essentially any item that was available for sale on Amazon. In return for products received, members were required to post a review within 30 days of delivery. Members were not allowed to sell or give away products received.

The Vine process changed in October 2016. Vine members can voluntarily check the website for a changing array of items and select an unlimited number of items to review from both their targeted Vine offers or from "Vine for All". This change was in response to increased vendor interest in this program. Another member change was Amazon ending all customer online discussion boards, including the ones that previously existed for Amazon Vine program members, in October 2017.

In 2023 the program changed to classify members into silver or gold tiers. The silver tier allows members to request up to three items per day from products valued at $100 or less. To be upgraded to the Gold tier, members must review at least 80 Vine items and 90% of their Vine orders within the six month evaluation period set by Amazon. Gold tier members can request up to eight items per day from products of any value. To remain in this tier, they must review at least 80 Vine items and 90% of their Vine orders within the six month evaluation period set by Amazon.

Beginning July 1, 2015, Vine members in the USA are required to provide tax identification numbers to Amazon before receiving any new materials to review. Amazon uses the estimated tax value (ETV) of products as non-cash, taxable payments to Vine Voices for their services. Ownership of each Vine third-party product transfers to the respective Vine Voice immediately upon the order date, and it is then that the ETV applies for tax purposes. For tax purposes, Amazon issues a 1099 to Vine members. Although included in the Vine Voices list of transferred items, consumable items, such as food, vitamins, and makeup, are valued at $0 and thus have no ETV for the reviewer.

== Criticism ==
The program has been met with criticism over the program's lack of transparency and the professionalism of its reviewers. Kristen McLean, formerly of the Association of Booksellers for Children, commented that Amazon did not initially disclose that publishers paid to have their products included in the Vine program and that "Amazon is not specific about how many people are in the program, how they're chosen." The program also initially met criticism over the visibility of the reviews, with librarian Elizabeth Bird (author and Top 500 Amazon Reviewer) commenting that her reviews were sometimes "shuffled off to the side" while Vine reviews were more prominently and visibly placed. Bird further commented that some of the reviewers were choosing and criticizing books that they were "not the best representative readers for" and that this highlighted the difference between lay readers and professional reviewers, that latter of who would be more able to "give insightful commentary and acknowledge a book's intended audience".
