= Shankar Narayanan =

American entrepreneur

- Born: Madurai, Tamil Nadu, India
- Citizenship: United States
- Education: Tamil Nadu Polytechnic; Thiagarajar College of Engineering (BE); Madurai Kamaraj University (MA); MBA
- Occupation: Entrepreneur
- Years active: 1985–present
- Spouse: Valsala Narayanan
- Children: 2

Shankar Narayanan is an Indian-born American entrepreneur based in the United States and India. He is the former Chairman, founder, and CEO of Spime Inc., a location technology company acquired by Trimble, a world leader in location technology products. Narayanan co-founded Nexus Inc., a networking solutions company based in Fremont, California, which was acquired in 2000. Following Nexus' acquisition, he co-founded Emuzed Inc., a mobile multimedia company in 2000. After Emuzed was acquired by Flextronics in 2005, he became the Vice President and General Manager of Flextronics Mobile Software Division. He left Flextronics to start Spime Inc., a location technology product company in 2006. He was the charter secretary of MCRT 99 of Round Table India and held various roles in the organization. He was also a member of Madras Cricket Club (MCC) in Chennai, India, and a member of Kodaikanal English Club and Kodai Golf Club.

== Career ==
In 1985, Narayanan began his career as technical staff at British Physical Laboratories. He then moved to Micro Advance, a computer startup, where he gained expertise in computer hardware and software. After a few years, he joined Aurelec Computers, one of India's first computer design companies based in Pondicherry.

In 1991, Narayanan invested in and became a founding member of Nexus Computers. At Nexus, he held various leadership positions in Management, Sales, Marketing & Support and was VP & General Manager of the company.

Later, he moved to Silicon Valley, California, and co-founded Nexus Inc., a networking software company. Following the acquisition of Nexus Inc. in 2000, Narayanan co-founded Emuzed Inc., a multimedia software company focused on phones and other mobile devices.

Emuzed developed the world's first audio and video synchronized video recording technology for cell phones in the early 2000s, which was then licensed to numerous cell phone manufacturers including Nokia, Samsung, and Siemens. Narayanan was also instrumental in deploying MPEG-2 encoder technology in personal computers; the first Microsoft Windows-XP Media Center PCs shipped by Hewlett Packard (HP) contained the MPEG-2 encoder hardware and software designed and manufactured by Emuzed.

In early 2005, Flextronics acquired Emuzed. Following the acquisition, Narayanan remained with Flextronics Mobile and Handset division as the Vice President and General Manager until June 2006.

After leaving Flextronics, Narayanan founded his third startup, Spime Inc., a location technology company, in September 2006. The name 'Spime' was derived from 'Space & Time'. He led Spime as its Chairman and CEO. Spime's location technology was licensed and deployed by Hewlett Packard (HP), Dell, Texas Instruments, and other major mobile device and silicon manufacturers. In May 2012, Spime Inc. was acquired by Trimble, a United States public company and leader in providing GPS and location-based products and solutions.

== Education ==
Narayanan attended elementary school in Usilampatti, Tamil Nadu, and St. Mary's High School in Madurai, India. He was active in theater and drama during his school years and participated in numerous plays and debates. He was also on the school's Track, Cricket, and Badminton teams.

Narayanan enrolled in Palani Andawar Polytechnic in Palani and, after a year transferred to Tamil Nadu Polytechnic in Madurai, where he graduated with a degree in Electrical and Electronic Engineering. He continued his engineering studies at Thiagarajar College of Engineering in Madurai and completed his Bachelor's course in Electrical and Electronics Engineering. He later completed a Master's in Administration at Madurai Kamaraj University followed by a Master's in Business Administration in the United States.

== Awards and recognition ==
In 2005, Jaya TV, a leading television channel in South India, interviewed Narayanan during their prime time morning program, honoring him as a successful Indian entrepreneur in the USA. In 2008, he was interviewed by Kalaignar TV, another popular South Indian television channel.

Narayanan has received numerous accolades, including the Global Youth Leadership Award (2010) and the Hind Rattan Award (2011), which he received in New Delhi from Cabinet ministers of the Government of India.

== Personal life ==
Narayanan was born in Madurai, Tamil Nadu to Sowthamini, a housewife, and Narayanan, a police officer. He was the youngest of four children.

Narayanan married Valsala in 1992 in Chennai, Tamil Nadu, India. The couple has two sons: Vaishaal Shankar (born 1993), who completed his undergraduate degree in Computer Science engineering at UC Berkeley and pursued a PhD in Artificial Intelligence at UC Berkeley, and Vishan Shankar (born 2004) who completed his undergraduate degree double major in Computer science and Data science at University of Wisconsin-Madison.
