= Business India =

- Categories: Business News
- Frequency: Fortnightly
- Publisher: Ashok Hotchand Advani
- Founded: 1978
- First issue: February 1978
- Company: Business India Publications Ltd.
- Country: India
- Based in: Mumbai
- Language: English
- Website: Business India
- ISSN: 0254-5268
- OCLC: 4525594

Business India is a fortnightly business news magazine founded by brothers Ashok Hotchand Advani, Hiroo Advani and Rajkumar Advani in 1978 and published in Mumbai, India. In 2001, the magazine had a circulation of 88,100 copies and it increased to 526,000 in 2006. The magazine is considered pioneer of Indian business magazines. The magazine started publication in English but is now also available in other Indian languages.
