= Ron Somers =

American businessman (born 1954)

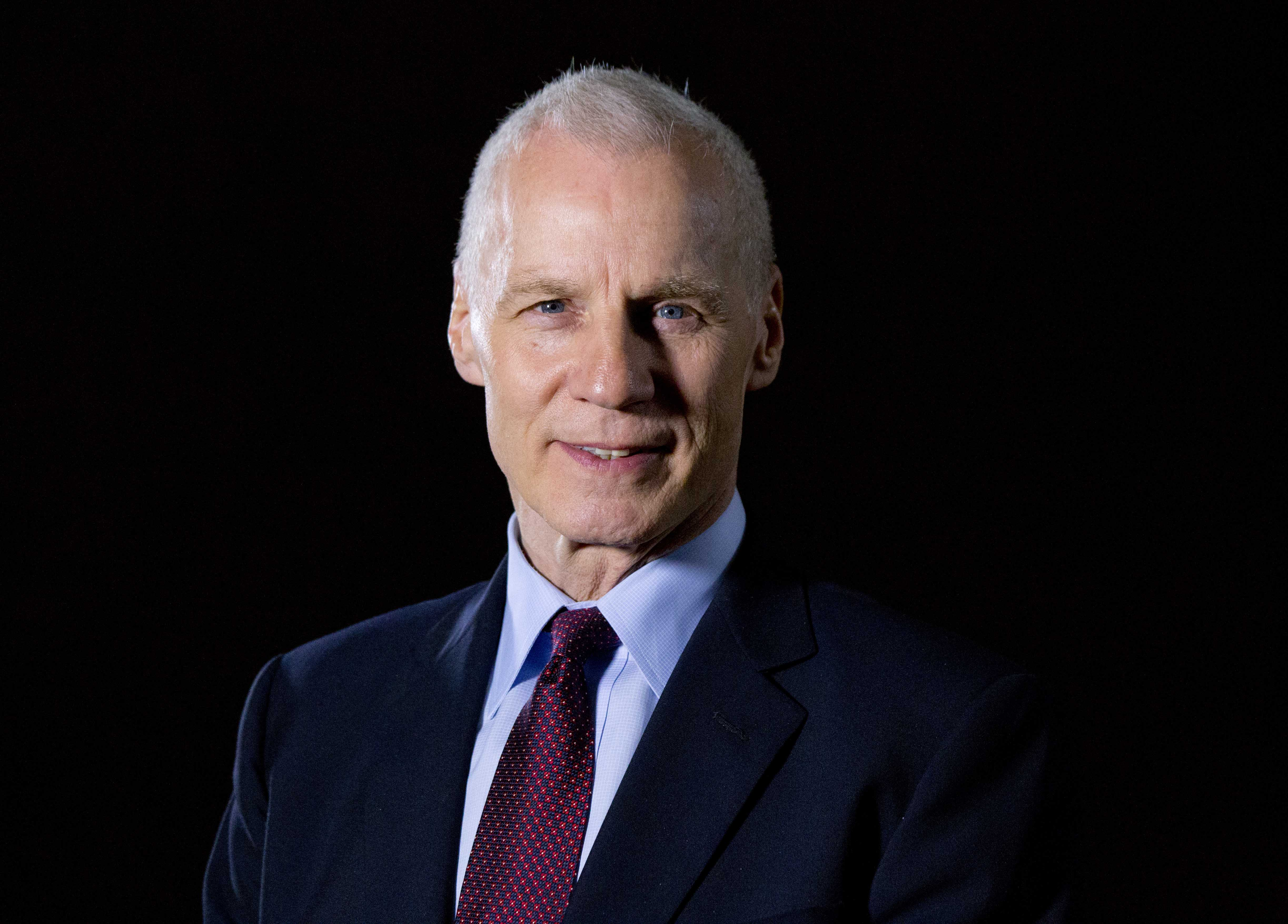
- Ron Somers in 2017
- Born: March 30, 1954 (age 72); Beverly, Massachusetts
- Education: Middlebury College; Oxford University
- Occupations: Founder and CEO, India First Group, LLC
- Known for: Indo-US civilian nuclear agreement
- Spouse: Rebecca Somers (wid.2012)

Ron Somers, an American businessman, is the former president of the U.S.-India Business Council. He played a lead role in coordinating the passage of the India–United States Civil Nuclear Agreement and is widely regarded as a prominent figure in U.S.-India relations. He is founder and CEO of India First Group, LLC, an international strategic advisory firm.

== Education ==
Somers holds an M.A. from the Bread Loaf Graduate School, where he studied at Lincoln College, Oxford University, and an Honors B.A. from Middlebury College in Vermont. A distinguished high school scholar/athlete, Somers graduated with academic honors in 1972 from Oxford Hills High School, Norway, Maine.

== Professional life ==
Somers has over 30 years of experience in major infrastructure development in the United States and Asia—starting in the oil and gas industry on the drilling rigs of West Texas, transitioning to hydroelectric and IPP development, and then onwards to senior management for international companies of upstream, midstream, and downstream energy and power assets.

After graduating from Middlebury College, Somers worked as a roughneck on the oil rigs of Midland, Texas, where he came to know future President of the United States George W. Bush. The young Bush helped Somers to get his first real career break as a landman. He soon moved to California, where he supported in 1981 the development of the first privately owned, commercial-sized run-of-river hydroelectric project in the western United States—the Bailey Creek Ranch Project, followed by the Montgomery Creek Hydroelectric Project—both of which are considered 'model' environmental projects even today. Somers maintains a 33% stake in Montgomery Creek Associates, a private limited partnership that has independently owned and operated clean, renewable energy assets in the western United States since 1985. After serving as Chairman of the Small Power Producers' Association of California, Somers was recruited by the U.S. Agency for International Development to live in India as Resident Adviser from 1992 onwards to supervise the India Private Power Initiative, supporting India's Union Ministry of Power to attract private investment into India's power sector. During this period, Somers traveled extensively to most Indian states, becoming an expert on India's emerging energy sector. With the support of U.S. Ambassador Frank G. Wisner, this specialized knowledge of India enabled Somers to brief U.S. Energy Secretary Hazel R. O'Leary and Commerce Secretary Ron Brown (U.S. politician) when these U.S. Cabinet officials made their historic, maiden visits to India.

The U.S- based, international energy development company, Cogentrix Energy, hired Somers in 1994 to pioneer the development of the $1 billion, 1000 MW Mangalore Thermal Power Project in Karnataka, India. Thereafter, Somers was hired in 1999 as Unocal Corporation's Country Head in India. In this capacity he was responsible for securing potential customers and forming strategic alliances in India for the proposed Bangladesh to India Natural Gas Pipeline. Concurrently, Somers was extremely active in India's upstream oil & gas industry through Unocal's 26% shareholding in Hindustan Oil Exploration Company. During his tenure, Unocal in India partnered with business houses and public sector enterprises to develop the proposed 3 million ton Ennore LNG Import Terminal in Tamil Nadu, the 350 MW gas-fired Gautami Power Project in Andhra Pradesh and the 700 MW combined-cycle Bidadi Project in Karnataka. In 2004, Somers was recruited to head up the U.S.-India Business Council in Washington, D.C.

During his time at the U.S.-India Business Council, Somers served as the council's president, establishing strategy, leading policy initiatives and advocacy efforts, and was responsible for the council's budgetary planning and communication with Capitol Hill and the Government of India. Under Somers' leadership, the Council grew to become the largest bilateral business association in the United States. Somers left USIBC in April, 2014 to start his own strategic consulting firm.

Somers played a lead role in securing passage of the Indo-US civilian nuclear agreement. He was aided by his knowledge of language and politics in India, which gave him credibility in the efforts to support passage. He also secured the support of relevant corporations, such as General Electric, Ford, Boeing, and Westinghouse. He has served on the Board of Directors of Hindustan Oil Exploration Company (HOEC), India's first private sector oil & gas exploration company, and on the Board of Directors of the U.S. Educational Foundation in India – which oversees the Fulbright and Humphrey Scholarships for India.

== Honors ==
- Member of the Honorable Order of Kentucky Colonels
