= Wedding of Anant Ambani and Radhika Merchant =

2024 wedding in Mumbai, India

- Date: 12 July 2024; 2 years ago
- Duration: 6 days
- Venue: Antilia and Jio Convention Center
- Location: Mumbai, India
- Budget: $600 million to $1 billion
- Participants: Anant Ambani; Radhika Merchant

The wedding of Anant Ambani and Radhika Merchant was a 6-day event that took place from 12 July 2024 until 18 July 2024 in the city of Mumbai, India at the Antilia building and Jio Convention Center. The groom was the son of Indian businessman Mukesh Ambani, the richest man in Asia, and Nita Ambani. Mukesh Ambani is the chairman and managing director of Reliance Industries, while the bride is the daughter of Shaila Merchant and Viren Kumar Merchant, the CEO of a healthcare company.

The wedding was described as India's "wedding of the year" and "India's own royal wedding". The New York Times described it as introducing "the world to [India]'s Gilded Age". Estimates for the wedding's cost range from $600 million to $1 billion, leading to very sharp criticism of inequality in India.

== Background ==
Anant Ambani (born 10 April 1995) is the youngest son of Mukesh Ambani, who has an estimated net worth of $123.3 billion, making him the richest man in Asia and ninth in the world. Mukesh Ambani is the head of Reliance Industries and Anant is in charge of Reliance's energy business and is the director of other boards of Reliance subsidiaries. He also runs Vantara, an animal rescue center in Jamnagar. He graduated with a bachelor's in business management from Brown University in 2017.

Radhika Merchant (born 18 December 1994) is the daughter of Viren Merchant, who is the CEO of Encore Healthcare and has been described as a pharmaceutical tycoon. Radhika has served as the marketing director for her father's company after graduating from New York University.

The two said they met in 2017 during a drive after being introduced by mutual friends. On 29 December 2023, Ambani proposed at the Shrinathji Temple in Rajasthan.

== Pre-wedding festivities ==
The first pre-wedding celebration was held in Jamnagar, with around 1,200 invited guests at the beginning of March 2024. A number of entertainers performed, such as Shah Rukh Khan, Diljit Dosanjh, and Deepika Padukone, as well as Rihanna, who gave her first full-length concert in eight years. Guests were told to wear jungle fever outfits when visiting Vantara. The second celebration was a four-day cruise through the Mediterranean in late May 2024. Guests saw surprise performances from the Backstreet Boys, Katy Perry, and Pitbull.

Leading up to the ceremony on 2 July 2024, a pre-wedding concert was held with performances by Justin Bieber, and Hindi film stars Alia Bhatt, Ranveer Singh, and Salman Khan. The sangeet ceremony for the couple, where the bride and groom, and their families performed choreographed dances on 5 July, with several poojas and a mehendi ceremony following. On 11 July, the bride and groom celebrated their haldi, where the couple are covered in turmeric paste as a blessing.

Gujarati folk singer Vaishali Harin Gohil and her team performed traditional Gujarati lagna geet at Antilia during the Gud-dhana and Pithi Vidhi ceremonies of Anant Ambani and Radhika Merchant.

A few special guests were also taken on a pre-wedding cruising tour of Italy.

== Fashion ==
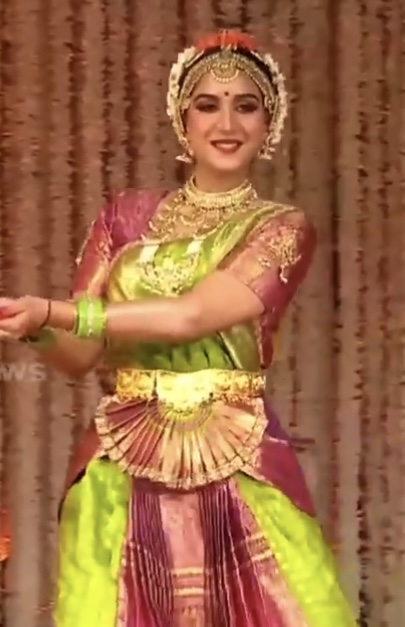
Merchant performing her first Arangetram

The fashion of Radhika Merchant, according to the Indian edition of Grazia, has had a substantial impact on the clothing industry ever since the public revelation of her relationship with businessman Anant Ambani in 2017 until leading up to her wedding in 2024.

Merchant wore a custom-made rose gold and pink Versace. During her wedding festivities, Merchant further wore a dupatta made of fresh flowers, which featured 90 yellow marigold flowers and thousands of fresh jasmine buds, as well as a yellow lehenga designed by Anamika Khanna and custom-made floral jewellery which took around six hours to complete, for her haldi. The skirt featured 3D floral prints. The lehenga designed by designer Manish Malhotra was inspired by Victorian aesthetics.

For one of the events, Merchant wore a gown by Robert Wun. The gown was imprinted with Anant Ambani's love letter, which he gave to Merchant on her 22nd birthday. Styled by Rhea Kapoor, the dress was acclaimed by the Hindustan Times as "dreamy" and as "[impressing] many people".

For her wedding day, the wedding lehenga was designed by Sandeep Khosla. Merchant's bridal lehenga featured zardozi cut-work with Gujarati cultural significance, a trailing ghagra with a second detachable trail, a 5-meter head veil, a blouse, and a tissue shoulder dupatta. The head veil featured jaali and cut-work, while the detachable trail boasted an 80-inch zardozi marvel. Her lehenga also featured a personalised "AR" brooch, representing the initials of her and her husband Anant's names.

== Wedding ==
The reported $600 million, four day wedding rituals began on 12 July 2024 with a traditional Hindu wedding ceremony followed by a reception that was planned to run through the weekend. The wedding festivities were split between Antilia, the home of the Ambanis, and the Jio World Convention Centre (Jio is a subsidiary of Reliance).

The venue was decorated with floral designs and sculptures created by florist Preston Bailey who was hired in April 2024. Among the designs by Bailey were 60 floral animal sculptures including tigers, elephants, monkeys and replicas of the couple's two dogs. Each sculpture, reportedly required between 100,000 to 200,000 flowers, which were majorly sourced from India.

The guest list was estimated in the "few thousands" with Mumbai Police preemptively rerouting traffic around the Mumbai venue. The guest list, although not confirmed by the Ambani family, included Cinema celebrities (Note: Amitabh Bachchan, Jaya Bachchan, Anupam Kher, Hema Malini, Rekha, Karan Johar, Madhuri Dixit, Vidya Balan, Siddharth Roy Kapur, Ajay Devgn, Anil Kapoor, Shah Rukh Khan, Gauri Khan, Salman Khan, Sanjay Dutt, Manyata Dutt, Priyanka Chopra, Nick Jonas, Genelia D'Souza, Riteish Deshmukh, Suniel Shetty, Athiya Shetty, Ahan Shetty, Katrina Kaif, Vicky Kaushal, Kriti Sanon, Varun Dhawan, Abhishek Bachchan, Aishwarya Rai, Ranbir Kapoor, Rajkummar Rao, Patralekha Paul, Hrithik Roshan, Jackie Shroff, Tiger Shroff, Ayesha Dutt, Krishna Shroff, Alia Bhatt, Janhvi Kapoor, Jacqueline Fernandez, Ananya Panday, Mahesh Babu, Namrata Shirodkar, Venkatesh, Akhil Akkineni, Rana Daggubati, Sobhita Dhulipala, Pooja Hegde, Rashmika Mandanna, Aditi Rao Hydari, Sara Ali Khan, Tamannaah Bhatia, Rakul Preet Singh, Jackky Bhagnani, Prithviraj Sukumaran, A. R. Rahman, Ram Charan, Rajinikanth, Latha Rajinikanth, Suriya, Jyotika, Raashi Khanna, Kajal Aggarwal, Nayanthara, Vignesh Shivan and Atlee), Indian cricketers (Note: Sachin Tendulkar, MS Dhoni, Jasprit Bumrah, and Suryakumar Yadav), along with former British Prime Ministers Tony Blair and Boris Johnson, Saudi Aramco CEO Amin H Nasser, American politician John Kerry, and celebrities like Adele, David Beckham, John Cena and the Kardashians.

== Reactions ==
Some Indian politicians criticised the amount of money spent on the wedding, with Shahid Siddiqui, a former member of the upper house of Parliament, calling it the "most vulgar and ostentatious marriage ever seen" and Thomas Isaac, a former finance minister for Kerala and member of the Communist Party of India (Marxist), stating that "...such ostentatious expenditure is a sin."

Members of the Indian public were divided about the wedding. Some called the wedding an "awe-inspiring showcase" while others pointed to how it highlighted the uneven development, as its budget could possibly eclipse the yearly education budget of several small Indian states. Reportedly the most common reaction in the working class of Mumbai, was frustration on the system which has allowed the inequality of resources. One worker echoed a common strain of "Ambani earned his money, and it's his right to spend it on his own children", but bemoaned how the city could find resources to assist in the wedding security, but not keep up infrastructure concerns like potholes or flooding.

== See also ==
- List of Indians by net worth
