= MD Anderson Cancer Center =

Hospital in Houston, Texas, U.S.

The University of Texas MD Anderson Cancer Center

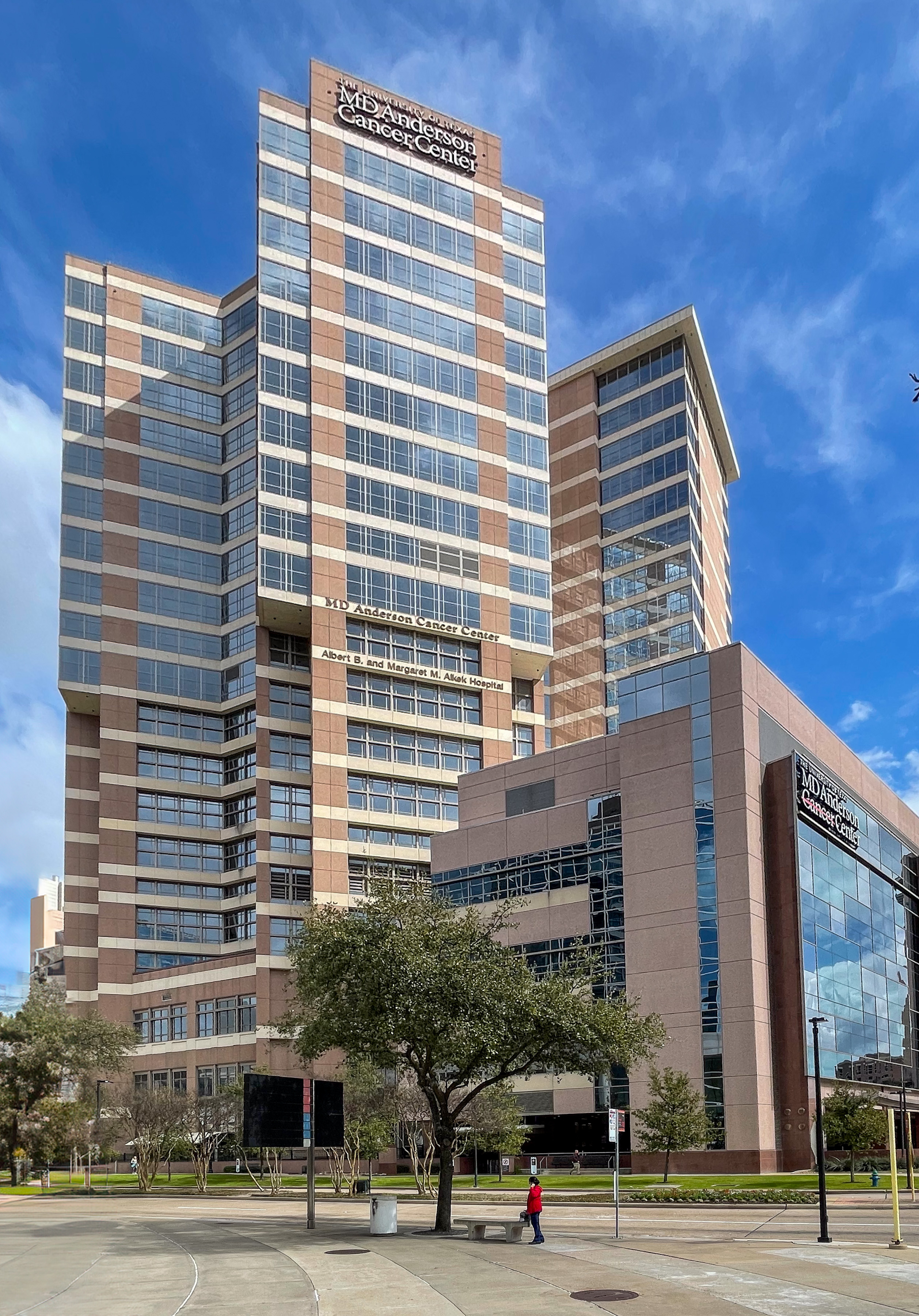
- The main MD Anderson building in 2024

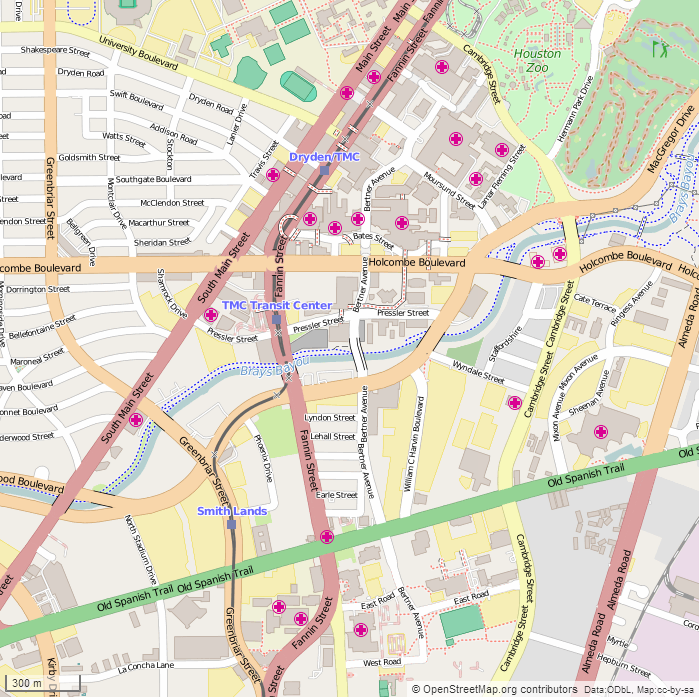
- Location within Houston Medical Center Location within Texas Location within the United States

Geography
- Location: Houston, Texas, United States
- Coordinates: 29.7078°N 95.3975°W

Organization
- Care system: Public
- Type: Specialist
- Affiliated university: The University of Texas System

Services
- Emergency department: Oncologic emergency center
- Beds: 760 (as of 2023)
- Speciality: Cancer

History
- Founded: 1941

Links
- Website: www.mdanderson.org
- Lists: Hospitals in the United States

The University of Texas MD Anderson Cancer Center (for short, UT MD Anderson) is a comprehensive cancer center and autonomous university of the University of Texas System in Houston, Texas, United States. It is the largest cancer center in the world and one of the original three NCI-designated comprehensive cancer centers in the country. It is both a degree-granting academic institution and a cancer treatment and research center located within the Texas Medical Center, the largest medical center and life sciences destination in the world. As of 2023, MD Anderson Cancer Center is home to the highest number of cancer clinical trials in the world and has received more NCI-funded projects than any other U.S. institute. For 2024, Newsweek placed MD Anderson at #1 in their annual list of the World's Best Specialized Hospitals in oncology.

== History ==
The cancer center is named after Monroe Dunaway Anderson, who feared that in the event of one of the partners' deaths, his cotton trading company would lose a large amount of money to estate tax and be forced to dissolve. To avoid this, Anderson created the MD Anderson Foundation with an initial sum of $300,000. In 1939, after Anderson's death, the foundation received $19 million.

In 1941, the Texas Legislature had appropriated $500,000 to build a cancer hospital and research center. The Anderson Foundation agreed to match funds with the state if the hospital were located in Houston in the Texas Medical Center (another project of the Anderson Foundation) and named after Anderson.

Since 1945 the Texas Medical Center was formed largely due to the efforts of the M.D. Anderson Foundation, which provided significant financial support and land. This initiative, coupled with the establishment of the M.D. Anderson Hospital for Cancer Research, laid the groundwork for what would become the largest medical center in the world.

Using surplus World War II Army barracks, the hospital operated for 10 years from a converted residence and 46 beds leased in a Houston hospital before moving to its current location in Texas Medical Center in 1954. This move allowed for significant expansion and the development of state-of-the-art facilities. Throughout the 1960s and 1970s, the center continued to expand its research capabilities and patient care services.

In 2015, the university was placed on a censure list issued by the American Association of University Professors for denying tenure to two professors. As part of the investigative process, the university questioned the AAUP's credentials and their ability to adjudicate tenure disputes.

== Organization ==
=== Status ===
MD Anderson Cancer Center is part of the University of Texas System, and is managed as a non-profit. However, it also has for-profit agreements.

=== Education and training ===
MD Anderson enjoys independent university status within the University of Texas System by providing postdoctoral fellowships, medical internship, and residency. These programs are designed for Ph.D., M.D., or M.D./Ph.D holders and medical professionals in basic and translational sciences and clinical practice, aiming to train the next generation of scientists and medical professionals in cancer care and research. MD Anderson offers a vast number of medical residency and fellowship programs across a comprehensive range of specialties in cancer treatment, diagnostics, and complex surgery. The institution offers M.S., Ph.D.s and dual M.D./Ph.D. degrees to students enrolled in The University of Texas MD Anderson Cancer Center UTHealth Houston Graduate School of Biomedical Sciences, which it operates with McGovern Medical School at the University of Texas Health Science Center at Houston (UTHealth). Areas of study include biochemistry and cell biology, cancer biology, genetics and epigenetics, immunology, medical physics, microbiology and infectious diseases, neuroscience, quantitative sciences, and therapeutics and pharmacology. Additionally, the institution offers bachelor's and master's degrees to students enrolled in The UT MD Anderson Cancer Center School of Health Professions. Areas of study include clinical laboratory science, cytogenetic technology, cytotechnology, diagnostic imaging, diagnostic medical sonography, healthcare disparities, diversity and advocacy, histotechnology, medical dosimetry, molecular genetic technology, diagnostic genetics, radiological sciences and radiation therapy.

=== Recognition ===
In addition to its No. 1 ranking in cancer care by U.S. News & World Report, the cancer center ranks first in the number of National Cancer Institute grants and invested $1.2 billion in research in FY 2023. The cancer center also has received Magnet Nursing recognition from the American Nurses Credentialing Center. The University of Texas MD Anderson Cancer Center has consistently ranked as the world's #1 hospital in oncology care and research. The University of Texas MD Anderson Cancer Center has been ranked #1 in cancer care by U.S. News & World Report for the 2024-2025 period. This ranking marks the tenth consecutive year that MD Anderson has achieved the top position, maintaining its leading status since 2014.

In May 1996, the Pan American Health Organization (PAHO/WHO) established the Collaborating Center for Supportive Cancer Care at the Pain Research Group, The University of Texas MD Anderson Cancer Center. The terms of reference engage the MD Anderson Center in the development of palliative care programs throughout Latin America and the Caribbean.

=== Presidents ===
MD Anderson has had five full-time presidents in its history:

- R. Lee Clark, M.D. (1946–1978)
- Charles LeMaistre, M.D. (1978–1996)
- John Mendelsohn, M.D. (1996–2011)
- Ronald DePinho, M.D. (2011–2017)
- Peter W. T. Pisters, M.D. (2017–present)

== Locations and campuses ==
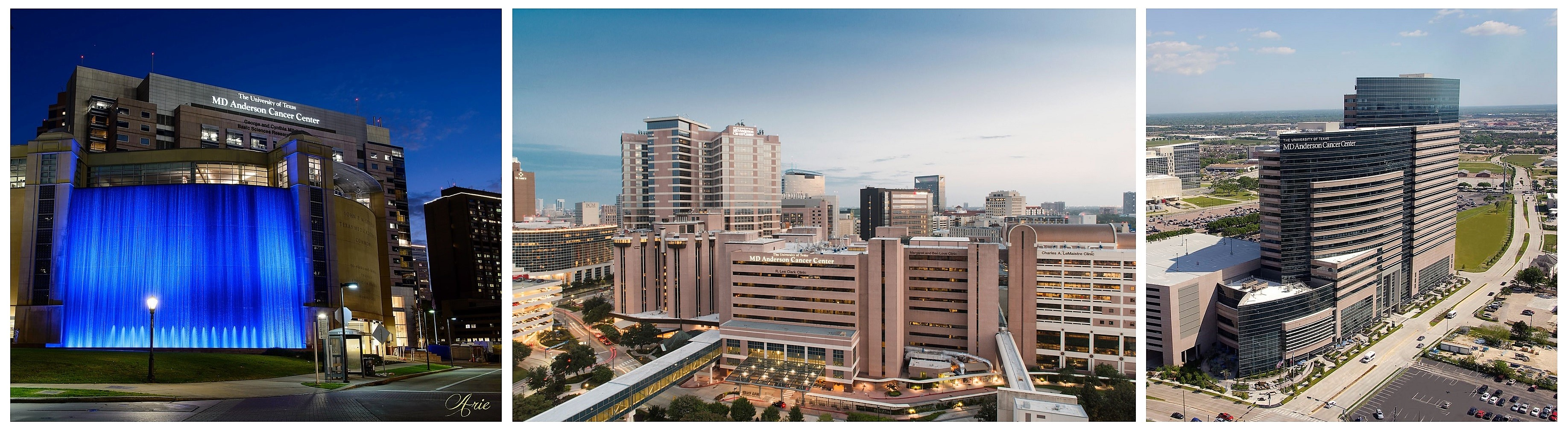
Mitchell pavilion; North campus main building and clinics; Mid campus.

=== Texas Medical Center (TMC) in Houston, Texas ===
MD Anderson Cancer Center is located at the Texas Medical Center, a "Medical Mini-City" in Houston, Texas. The Texas Medical Center is the largest medical center and life sciences hub in the world with one of the highest densities of clinical facilities for patient care, basic science, and translational research.

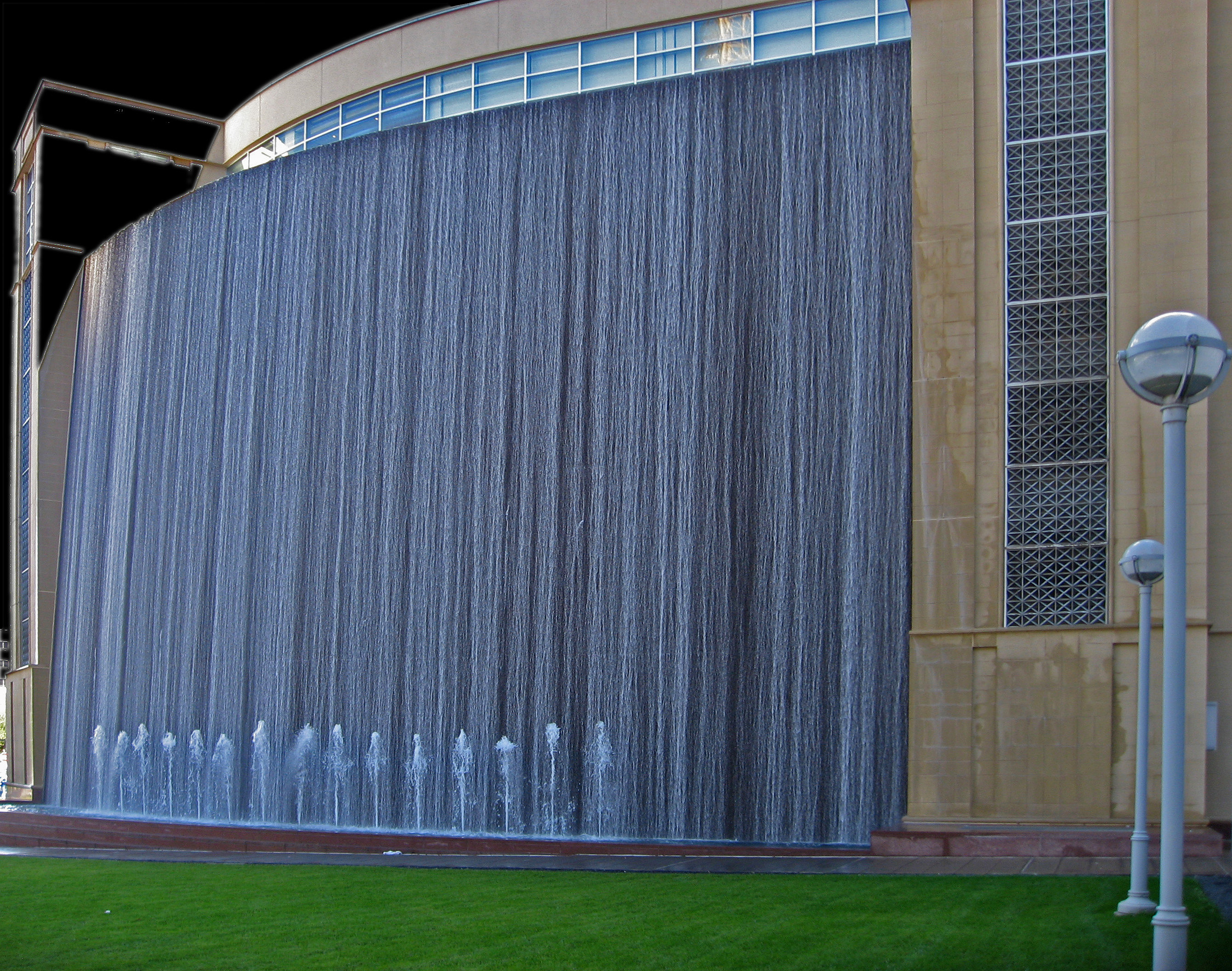
Water wall at MD Anderson Cancer Center

The MD Anderson campus is divided into the North Campus, Mid Campus and South Campus. The North Campus includes: The Main Building, which comprises Alkek Hospital, Bates-Freeman Building, Clark Clinic, Gimbel Building, Jones Research Building, LeMaistre Clinic, Love Clinic and Lutheran Hospital Pavilion. Other facilities on this campus are the Dan L. Duncan Building, Clinical Research Building, Faculty Center, Mays Clinic, Mitchell Basic Sciences Research Building, Pickens Academic Tower, Radiology Outpatient Center and Rotary House International. The T. Boone Pickens Academic Tower, a 21-story, 730,000-square-foot (68,000 m^{2}) building, which opened in 2008, is named after T. Boone Pickens, who donated to the cancer center. It houses classrooms, conference facilities, and executive and faculty offices.

The South Campus is home to the McCombs Institute for the Early Detection and Treatment of Cancer, which includes seven translational research centers focused on genomics, proteomics, screening, diagnostic imaging and drug development. The Mid Campus building, a 25-story building to support current office space and future growth needs, opened in 2011.

The MD Anderson Cancer Center's Houston campus houses multiple specialized institutes that enhance its comprehensive approach to cancer care. These include the James P. Allison Institute, dedicated to advancing immunotherapy; the Duncan Family Institute for Cancer Prevention and Risk Assessment, focusing on cancer prevention and risk analysis; the Institute for Applied Cancer Science, which drives the translation of scientific discoveries into new therapies; the Institute for Cancer Care Innovation, aimed at improving cancer care delivery and outcomes; the Institute for Data Science in Oncology, leveraging big data for cancer research; and the Sheikh Khalifa Bin Zayed Al Nahyan Institute for Personalized Cancer Therapy, which tailors treatments to individual patients based on genetic and molecular profiling.

In 2023, MD Anderson Cancer Center broke ground on a new 600,000-square-foot facility in the Helix Park of the Texas Medical Center (TMC) to serve as the centerpiece of the institution's large south campus research park. This building will house several of MD Anderson's strategic research programs, including the newly established James P. Allison Institute. The TMC3 Collaborative Building in the Helix Park will also host commercial life sciences companies, industry leaders, and TMC Venture Fund.

MD Anderson Cancer Center is one of the four founding institutions of the Helix Park campus of Texas Medical Center (TMC). At the TMC Helix Park campus, healthcare professionals, academics, and business leaders collaborate to develop new medicines, medical devices, diagnostics, digital health platforms, and treatment solutions. This accelerates the discovery and delivery of life-changing advancements. The TMC3 Helix Park hotel provides accommodations for life science researchers, industry executives, and venture capitalists, contributing to Houston's ambition to become a global leader in life sciences and human health. TMC Helix Park aims to make a $5.4 billion economic impact.

=== MD Anderson Children's Cancer Hospital ===
MD Anderson Children's Cancer Hospital is the pediatric unit of the MD Anderson Cancer Center system. The hospital treats infants, children, teens, and young adults even up to age 29 through their AYA cancer program. MD Anderson Children's Cancer Hospital is located on the 9th floor of the main building at the Texas Medical Center, Houston campus.

=== MD Anderson Cancer Center Sheikh Khalifa Bin Zayed Al Nahyan Institute for Personalized Cancer Therapy ===
In 2011, the President of the United Arab Emirates donated $150 million to MD Anderson Cancer Center. The donation was to start The MD Anderson Cancer Center Sheikh Khalifa Bin Zayed Al Nahyan Institute for Personalized Cancer Therapy. This gift was in honor of the UAE president's father, Zayed bin Sultan Al Nahyan, who led the UAE for over thirty years until his death in 2004. The institute focuses on research and clinical trials where doctors use a patient's tumor biopsy to find abnormal genes. They then choose treatments that target those specific genes to fight cancer. The MD Anderson Zayed Building for Personalized Cancer Care is located on the MD Anderson Cancer Center campus in Texas Medical Center, Houston, Texas. The MD Anderson Cancer Center also includes the Khalifa Institute for Personalized Cancer Therapy and the Sheikh Ahmed bin Zayed Al Nahyan Center for Pancreatic Cancer Research. Emiratis can benefit from the Khalifa bin Zayed Al Nahyan Foundation's scholarship program to pursue fellowships, residency programs, postgraduate studies, and observerships at the center. Khalifa Scholars are chosen from faculty-level physicians and researchers at MD Anderson. They receive financial support equivalent to one to two years' salary to help with their independent research projects. The Zayed Building received 2016 R&D Magazine Lab of the Year Award.

=== James P. Allison Institute at MD Anderson Cancer Center ===
The James P. Allison Institute was established after its namesake, Nobel laureate James P. Allison, Professor and Chair of Immunology at MD Anderson Cancer Center. Allison was awarded the 2018 Nobel Prize in Physiology or Medicine jointly with Tasuku Honjo "for their discovery of cancer therapy by inhibition of negative immune regulation". The institute was established to unlock the full potential of cancer immunotherapy. It is located within the south campus of MD Anderson Cancer Center in the Helix Park area of the Texas Medical Center in Houston, Texas. Timken Foundation has made a $5 million commitment to support the James P. Allison Institute at MD Anderson.

=== Meyers Institute for Oncology Nursing at MD Anderson Cancer Center ===
This first-of-its-kind institute in the U.S. is dedicated to enhancing oncology nursing care and research, aiming to significantly improve patient outcomes through specialized education, training, and innovative research initiatives. Howard Meyers donated $25 million to establish the Meyers Institute for Oncology Nursing at MD Anderson Cancer Center, Houston, Texas.

=== Other locations in greater Houston metropolitan area ===
MD Anderson operates several other locations within the Greater Houston, Texas area. They include:

- MD Anderson League City, on the University of Texas Medical Branch League City campus. Specialties include breast cancer, colorectal cancer, dermatology and skin cancer, endocrine cancer, genitourinary cancer, gynecologic cancer, head and neck cancer, neurologic cancer, and thoracic cancer.
- MD Anderson Sugar Land, on the campus of St. Luke's Sugar Land Hospital. Specialties include breast cancer, colorectal cancer, dermatology and skin cancer, endocrine cancer, thoracic cancer, neurologic cancer, genitourinary cancer, and gynecologic cancer.
- MD Anderson West Houston. Specialties include breast cancer, colorectal cancer, dermatology and skin cancer, endocrine cancer, head and neck cancer, thoracic cancer, neurologic cancer, genitourinary cancer, gynecologic cancer, and urology.
- MD Anderson The Woodlands, on the campus of St. Luke's The Woodlands Hospital. Specialties include breast cancer, colorectal cancer, dermatology and skin cancer, endocrine cancer, head and neck cancer, thoracic cancer, neurologic cancer, genitourinary cancer, and gynecologic cancer.
- MD Anderson Surgical Clinic Memorial City, on the campus of Memorial Hermann Memorial City Medical Center. This location offers surgical consultation for many types of cancer. It has special expertise in the diagnosis and surgical treatment of breast cancer, gynecologic cancer, thoracic cancer, head and neck cancer, urologic cancer, neurologic cancer, and plastic surgery and reconstruction.
- MD Anderson Gynecologic Oncology Clinic in the Texas Medical Center, on the campus of The Woman's Hospital of Texas. This facility specializes in gynecological cancers and treats cervical cancer, fallopian tube cancer, uterine (endometrial) cancer, vaginal cancer, ovarian cancer, vulvar cancer, gynecologic sarcomas, gestational trophoblastic disease, pre-invasive diseases of the lower genital tract, and primary peritoneal cancer.
- In September 2018, in collaboration with The University of Texas Medical Branch, the MD Anderson Bay Area location moved to a newly built facility in League City, Texas.

=== Expansion to Austin, Texas ===
On August 14, 2023, the University of Texas System announced its plan to build a new MD Anderson Cancer Center in Austin, Texas, on the current site of the Frank Erwin Center adjacent to the University of Texas at Austin campus. The new center will collaborate with a new UT Austin teaching hospital that will also be built nearby. The demolition of the Erwin Center is scheduled to be completed in 2024, and the groundbreakings for the new hospitals are projected to commence in 2026.

=== Other locations outside Texas in U.S. ===
Several hospitals and institutions outside of Texas are part of the MD Anderson Cancer Network. These independently operated facilities follow MD Anderson treatment plans and standards of care. The network includes:

- The MD Anderson Radiation Treatment Center at Presbyterian Kaseman Hospital is located in the Presbyterian Kaseman Hospital in Albuquerque, New Mexico.
- Banner MD Anderson Cancer Center in Gilbert, a city in the Greater Phoenix area of Arizona, opened in September 2011.
- MD Anderson Cancer Center at Cooper, located in Camden, New Jersey, opened in October 2013.
- Baptist MD Anderson Cancer Center in Jacksonville, Florida, opened in October 2015.
- AdventHealth Shawnee Mission Cancer Center in Merriam, Kansas joined in 2017.
- Banner MD Anderson Cancer Center at North Colorado Medical Center in Greeley, Colorado, opened 2018.
- RUSH MD Anderson Cancer Center in Chicago, joined in 2024.

=== Expansion to Madrid, Spain ===
In 2000, MD Anderson Cancer Center, Madrid, Spain started operating as the first global branch of The University of Texas MD Anderson Cancer Center, Houston, Texas. MD Anderson Madrid is currently a Center of Excellence for the treatment of cancer in Spain and Europe and one of the most productive institutions in Spain for cancer research. The MD Anderson Cancer Center Spain Foundation Excellence Training Program develops talented non-healthcare researchers in Spain through collaborations with top institutions, aiming to enhance their academic and research careers. It targets postdoctoral researchers in biomedical sciences, offering opportunities for research and teaching.

=== Expansion to Istanbul, Turkey ===
The MD Anderson Radiation Treatment Center in Istanbul at American Hospital is located in the Vehbi Koc Foundation (VKF) American Hospital in Istanbul, Turkey.

== Sister institutions ==
MD Anderson has formed sister institution relationships with more than 25 organizations in Asia, Europe, Central America and South America through its Global Academic Programs department. Collaborations focus on research, prevention, education and patient care.

- The collaboration between the MD Anderson Cancer Center in Houston and Tata Memorial Hospital (TMH) in Mumbai, India is a significant partnership aimed at enhancing cancer research, education, and clinical care. Established in 2003, this sister institution accord was facilitated by the Indo-American Chamber of Commerce of Greater Houston. The partnership focuses on multiple areas, including physician education and training, clinical services, research collaboration, quality assurance programs, faculty exchange visits, and nursing and technical staff training.
- In 2014, Nita Ambani, founder and chairperson of Reliance Foundation became first Indian businessperson to join the MD Anderson Cancer Center Board of Visitors (BOV). MD Anderson experts have been working with Reliance Foundation to guide the development of a multidisciplinary cancer center at Sir H. N. Reliance Foundation Hospital in Mumbai, India.
- In 2023, The University of Texas MD Anderson Cancer Center revealed plans to expand its global oncology initiatives in Mozambique and Brazil. This includes a new four-year partnership aimed at enhancing cancer prevention and treatment in collaboration with Mozambique's Ministry of Health. Additionally, MD Anderson received a $5.1 million grant from the National Institutes of Health (NIH) to support cervical cancer prevention and treatment for women living with HIV.

=== MD Anderson Cancer Center Africa Initiative ===
The MD Anderson Cancer Center's Africa Initiative, part of its Global Oncology Program launched in September 2022, aims to reduce the cancer burden in low- and middle-income countries (LMICs) through comprehensive education, training, and collaborative research. One of the flagship projects under this initiative is Project ECHO (Extension for Community Healthcare Outcomes), which employs case-based learning and videoconferencing to enhance the skills of healthcare providers in LMICs, particularly in cancer prevention, control, and treatment. Additionally, the Palliative Care in Africa (PACA) initiative connects regional experts and providers across several African nations like Ghana, Kenya, Nigeria, South Africa, Zambia to improve palliative care for advanced cancer patients through regular teleconferences and training sessions. This initiative underscores MD Anderson's commitment to global health by fostering international collaborations and supporting capacity building in regions with limited resources.

=== Collaboration with World Health Organization (WHO) ===
In 2022, MD Anderson Cancer Center and the World Health Organization (WHO) have launched a new international collaboration aimed at reducing the incidence and impact of women's cancers globally. This initiative focuses on enhancing prevention, early detection, and treatment strategies to improve women's health outcomes worldwide.

== Major achievements and scientific breakthroughs ==
Since 1944, MD Anderson Cancer Center has provided cancer care to over 1.2 million individuals. The institution has made significant global impact by translating research discoveries into life-saving treatments. Through its Moon Shots Program, MD Anderson accelerates the transformation of breakthroughs into clinical advancements. Here are some notable achievements over the past 75 years.

- 1949: Development of the Cobalt-60 Unit for Radiation Therapy

English physicist Leonard Grimmett and French-born physician Gilbert Fletcher at MD Anderson design a revolutionary cobalt-60 unit, transforming radiation therapy.

- 1958: Invention of the Continuous-Flow Blood Cell Separator

Emil J. Freireich, M.D., pioneers the continuous-flow blood cell separator, enhancing blood transfusion processes and advancing oncology treatments.

- 1964: Introduction of Chemotherapy for Wilms' Tumor

Wataru Sutow, M.D., achieves significant improvement in survival rates for children with Wilms' tumor through groundbreaking chemotherapy.

- 1968: Establishment of the Radiological Physics Center

MD Anderson becomes the hub for uniform radiation dosimetry in cancer clinical trials, pioneering standardized radiation physics.

- 1976: Validation of Lumpectomy with Radiation Therapy for Breast Cancer

MD Anderson demonstrates the efficacy of lumpectomy followed by radiation therapy, establishing a global standard in breast cancer treatment.

- 1978: Collaboration for Blood Component Therapy

MD Anderson partnered with IBM to develop a simplified blood cell separator, revolutionizing blood component therapy accessibility and transforming its availability and use throughout the U.S.

- 1981: Installation of the First Medical Cyclotron in the U.S.

MD Anderson installs the nation's first medical cyclotron with funding from the National Cancer Institute, advancing cancer treatment technology.

- 1985: Development of Liposomal-Encapsulated Antifungal Therapy

Gabriel Lopez-Berestein, M.D., pioneers liposomal-encapsulated antifungal agents, transforming treatment options for immunocompromised cancer patients.

- 1988: Introduction of Electron Beam Radiotherapy in Surgery

MD Anderson opens the first operating room with a linear accelerator for electron beam radiotherapy, enhancing surgical cancer treatment.

- 1994: Invention of Intensity-Modulated Radiation Therapy (IMRT)

Scientists at MD Anderson develop IMRT, a precise radiation therapy technique conforming doses to tumor shapes in three dimensions.

- 2005: Pioneering Pencil Beam Scanning in Proton Therapy

MD Anderson introduces pencil beam scanning in its proton therapy facility, enhancing precision and sparing healthy tissue in cancer treatment.

- 2006: FDA Approval of Dasatinib and Nilotinib for Resistant Leukemia

MD Anderson researchers demonstrate the efficacy of dasatinib and nilotinib, leading to FDA approval for Gleevec-resistant chronic myelogenous leukemia.

- 2009: Development of 3-BrOP for Neuroblastoma Treatment

An experimental drug, 3-BrOP, developed at MD Anderson, shows promising results in starving neuroblastoma cells and other cancers.

- 2012: Launch of MD Anderson Moon Shots Program

MD Anderson launches the Moon Shots Program in 2012, a bold initiative aimed at accelerating the pace of converting scientific discoveries into clinical advances that significantly impact patient care. The program focuses on tackling cancer by uniting multidisciplinary teams of researchers, clinicians, and industry partners to pursue innovative approaches. Each "moon shot" aims to address specific cancer types or challenges, utilizing cutting-edge technologies and collaborative efforts to achieve ambitious goals in prevention, diagnosis, and treatment. Through this initiative, MD Anderson continues to lead the way in advancing cancer research and translating findings into practical solutions for patients worldwide. In 2013, Lyda Hill pledged $50 million to Moon Shots Program.

- 2013: Development of Oncolytic Adenovirus Therapy for Brain Tumors

Juan Fueyo, M.D., and Candelaria Gomez-Manzano, M.D., create an experimental therapy using adenovirus to target and treat brain tumors.

- 2018: Nobel Prize in Physiology or Medicine for Immune Checkpoint Therapy

James P. Allison, professor and chair of immunology at MD Anderson Cancer Center, Houston receives the Nobel Prize in Physiology or Medicine with Tasuku Honjo for their discovery of cancer therapy by inhibition of negative immune regulation, leading to the development of immune checkpoint inhibitors.

== MD Anderson Services Corporation ==
MD Anderson Services Corporation (formerly MD Anderson Cancer Center Outreach Corporation) was established in 1989 as a not-for-profit corporation to enhance revenues of The University of Texas MD Anderson Cancer Center by establishing joint ventures in selected markets, providing additional referrals to the institution, contracting for delivery of inpatient and out-patient management, using existing UT MD Anderson Cancer Center reference laboratory services, and fostering additional philanthropy in distant areas.

== Accommodation for patients ==
The Jesse H. Jones Rotary House International is a full-service hotel entirely owned by the MD Anderson Cancer Center and managed by Marriott International. This hotel is specifically dedicated to serving the needs of MD Anderson patients and their families during their stay in Houston, Texas. Additionally, there are numerous other hotels within walking distance of the MD Anderson Cancer Center, located on the Texas Medical Center (TMC) campus. These hotels are operated by various multinational hospitality companies, including Marriott, DoubleTree by Hilton, Westin, Hyatt, among others.

== Children's Art Project at The University of Texas MD Anderson Cancer Center ==
Children's Art Project at The University of Texas MD Anderson Cancer Center is an initiative that enables pediatric cancer patients to express their creativity through art. Since its inception in 1973, the program has transformed artworks created by young patients into products such as greeting cards, apparel, and home décor. These items are sold to support patient-focused programs, cancer research, and patient care initiatives at MD Anderson. The project provides a therapeutic outlet for children and helps raise funds to benefit the cancer center.

== See also ==
- Memorial Sloan Kettering Cancer Center
- James L. Abbruzzese
- Leon Dmochowski
- Stephen Hahn
- John McGinness
- Eleanor Montague
- Radhe Mohan
- James P. Allison
