= Vantara =

Animal conservation centre in Jamnagar, Gujarat, India

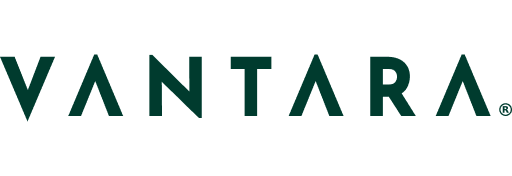

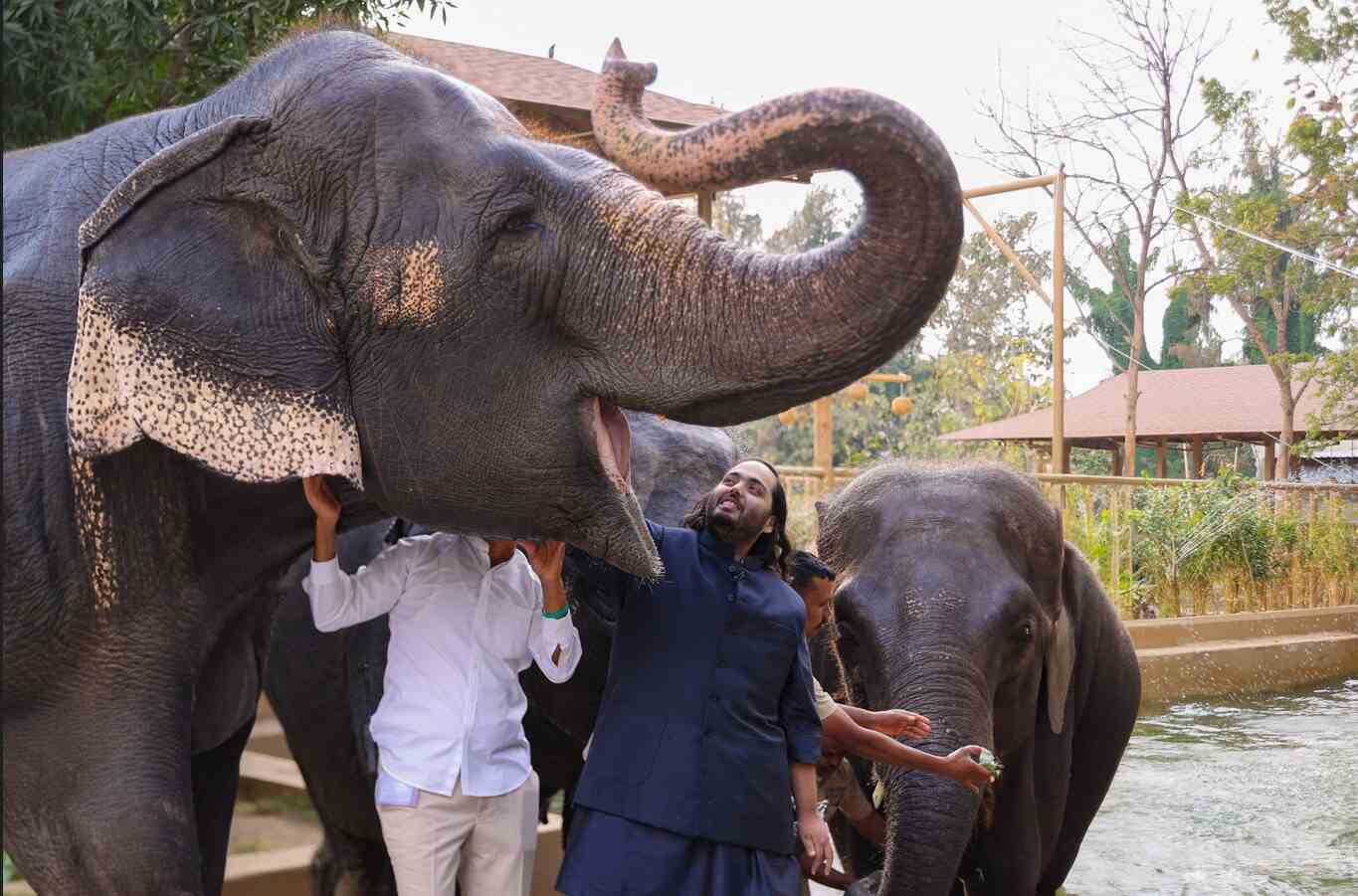
- Anant Ambani at Vantara with elephants
- Interactive map of Vantara
- 22.326517°N 69.924159°E
- Date opened: 4 March 2025; 20 months ago
- Location: Motikhavdi, Jamnagar district, Gujarat, India
- Land area: 3,500 acres (14 km^{2}; 5.5 sq mi)
- No. of species: 2,000+
- Annual visitors: 0 (Off-Display Facility/Non-Public Access Zoo)
- Owner: Reliance Foundation
- Management: Greens Zoological Rescue and Rehabilitation Centre, Reliance Foundation
- Website: https://vantara.in/

Vantara (transl. Star of the Forest) is a privately-owned, non-public access wildlife rescue, care, rehabilitation and conservation centre in Motikhavdi, Jamnagar district, Gujarat, India. It is located within a 3,500-acre green belt at Motikhavdi village in Jamnagar district, Gujarat, India. The project was officially launched on 26 February 2024 and was later inaugurated by Prime Minister of India Narendra Modi on 4 March 2025.

As of 2025, the facility reportedly housed more than 150,000 animals across over 2,000 species. Vantara received the Prani Mitra award in the corporate category from the Animal Welfare Board of India for its contributions to animal welfare.

The initiative has been subject to significant public controversy, multiple legal challenges, and criticism as a "vanity project" due to its lack of public access. It has also faced criticism over the alleged unethical sourcing of animals, with investigative reports and animal rights groups alleging links to the global wildlife trade. Vantara has also been accused of using animals for private entertainment during pre-wedding festivities, attempting to muzzle critical press coverage, and using fake legal notices to intimidate journalists. The court-ordered relocation of a revered temple elephant, Mahadevi, to the facility in July 2025 also sparked widespread public protests. Following these public concerns, the Supreme Court of India appointed a Special Investigation Team (SIT) in August 2025 to examine allegations of illegal animal acquisition and financial irregularities. In September 2025, the Supreme Court accepted the SIT's sealed report, which cleared Vantara of any legal or ethical violations, and subsequently closed all pending petitions against the facility. However, the same report has been challenged by CITES, which has imposed a blanket ban on all wildlife imports to India based on its own findings.

== History ==
In media interviews, Anant Ambani has credited his interest in animal welfare to a childhood experience during a family trip between Jaipur and Ranthambore, where they encountered an injured elephant that was subsequently rescued. He described this event as influential in shaping the family's involvement in animal care. Over time, these efforts transitioned from informal activities to a structured program under the Reliance Foundation. The foundation has stated that the initiative draws inspiration from the concept of jeev seva (service to living beings), which it links to the teachings of Swami Vivekananda.

The facility received its first animal, an elephant named Gauri, in 2009. Gauri had previously been kept in an urban setting in Rajasthan before being moved to the centre. In 2024, twenty elephants formerly used in logging operations in Arunachal Pradesh were relocated to the facility. Elephants were transferred to Vantara to escape harsh work environments where the elephants had to drag timber and be chained up.

In May 2024, approximately 1,825 animals, including jaguars, tapirs, crocodiles, and various monkey species were brought from Venezuela, transported by air. According to official statements, the transfer was approved by relevant forest departments and overseen by a court-appointed committee. However, significant concerns were raised by wildlife activists and legal experts about transferring these jumbos to a far corner of the country that only superficially resembles their natural habitat. By 2025, the organisation reported caring for over 150,000 animals, including elephants, rhinos, leopards, crocodiles, reptiles, and birds. In 2025, it was awarded the Prani Mitra National Award in the corporate category from the Animal Welfare Board of India.

The facility has been involved in supporting the Maharashtra Forest Department in matters related to state wildlife management. In November 2025, the Central Zoo Authority (CZA) approved a proposal concerning the relocation of up to 50 leopards from the Junnar and Shirur regions of Pune district to Vantara, following an increase in human–wildlife conflict that had placed pressure on government rescue facilities. However, as of that time, the proposal had not been accepted by Vantara, and no transfers of leopards had occurred.

== Facilities and conservation ==
The primary conservation zone of Vantara is the Greens Zoological Rescue and Rehabilitation Centre (GZRRC), which spans around 650 acres. The remaining area includes veterinary units, administrative buildings, and support infrastructure, bringing the total campus area to 3,500 acres. The facility is not open to the general public.

Among the key units is the Centre for Elephants, which includes an elephant hospital equipped with hydrotherapy pools, medical imaging systems, and other specialized veterinary tools. The broader Wildlife Hospital and Research Centre reportedly covers around 100,000 square feet and includes MRI, CT scan, ultrasound, X-ray, surgical rooms, and quarantine facilities.

Animal care is structured through species-specific enclosures, including dedicated zones for big cats, reptiles, herbivores, and exotic animals. The initiative operates under the regulatory frameworks set by the Central Zoo Authority and relevant state wildlife departments. It also maintains internal security and animal transport services.

Despite all these, some animal rights groups in India have expressed skepticism over the privatization of the animals, along with the remote, over-developed, polluted and unsuitable nature of the reservation's location, as Jamnagar is located in a hot, arid climate and the Jamnagar Refinery, the largest oil refinery in the world, is owned by the same company and is located only a short distance away. Animal rights groups are questioning whether the privatization of animals, remote location, climate, and proximity to industrial development is unsustainable for long term animal conservation.

In December 2025, Indonesia's Ministry of Forestry requested technical input from Vantara following the death of a Sumatran elephant linked to Elephant Endotheliotropic Herpesvirus (EEHV). According to media reports, a Vantara veterinary team travelled to Riau to review the cases, share clinical protocols and treatment approaches developed through its elephant-care work, and to provide advisory guidance to local authorities on strengthening early-detection and veterinary response practices.

== Controversies ==
=== Allegations of unethical animal sourcing and wildlife trade links ===
A March 2024 investigative report by Himal Southasian alleges that Vantara may be indirectly fueling the illegal global wildlife trade under the guise of conservation. The sanctuary has imported around 39,000 animals from 32 countries, including those known for trafficking, raising concerns about the legitimacy of sources and potential violations of international and Indian wildlife laws. Critics question the transparency of these operations and warn that such large-scale acquisitions—especially from dubious or small-scale suppliers—could incentivize illegal wildlife capture and trade, despite Vantara's claims of legal and ethical compliance. The investigative report was republished by the Pulitzer Center.

As a follow-up to earlier reports scrutinising Vantara's wildlife acquisition practices, the Delhi High Court on 19 May 2025 dismissed a contempt of court petition filed by Vantara (Greens Zoological Rescue and Rehabilitation Centre) against the Himal Southasian. Vantara had accused Himal of violating a court order by not removing an investigative article published in March 2024. The court ruled that no such judicial directive existed, rendering the contempt allegation baseless.

In March 2025, a coalition of 30 South African animal rights groups, under the Wildlife Animal Protection Forum of South Africa (WAPFSA), urged their government to investigate the export of wild animals to Vantara. The coalition expressed concerns over potential violations of international wildlife trade regulations, particularly regarding the sourcing of animals from South African breeding facilities. They highlighted that the Convention on International Trade in Endangered Species had previously raised issues about India's compliance concerning live animal imports, including critically endangered species. Vantara refuted the allegations, stating that all animal transfers were conducted in full compliance with South African and Indian laws. Wildlife activists also argued the sanctuary was unfit to handle elephants in an unstable hot environment.

Following sustained public concern and litigation over Vantara’s wildlife acquisition practices, the Supreme Court of India, in late August 2025, constituted a four-member Special Investigation Team (SIT) headed by former Supreme Court judge Jasti Chelameswar to examine allegations surrounding the facility. These allegations included claims of illegal wildlife acquisition or smuggling, violations of the Wildlife Protection Act, 1972, failure to comply with the CITES, irregularities in international documentation, and questions about the suitability of the Jamnagar site for such a large population of exotic and endangered species. The SIT carried out field inspections at Vantara, reviewed permits and import/export records, and coordinated with several statutory and enforcement bodies, including the Central Zoo Authority, Wildlife Crime Control Bureau, state forest departments, the Directorate of Revenue Intelligence, and the Enforcement Directorate. Its sealed report was submitted to the Supreme Court on 12 September 2025, concluding that Vantara had not violated any legal or ethical standards in its acquisition and care of animals.

On 15 September 2025, the Supreme Court accepted the SIT’s findings and closed all pending petitions and complaints against Vantara. In its order, the Court stated that no further complaints on the same set of allegations would be entertained by any judicial, statutory, or administrative forum, thereby providing finality to the matter. Summaries of the SIT’s conclusions were shared in court filings and media reports, but the complete report itself has not been publicly released. Despite receiving the clean chit, the CITES Secretariat found discrepancies in animal imports. Czech authorities confirmed animals were sold to Vantara with invoices, contradicting SIT claims of no payments. CITES also flagged the import of a mountain gorilla from the UAE’s Capital Zoo, tracing irregular links through Haiti with no trade records. The report urged India to strengthen wildlife enforcement, halt Appendix I imports, and submit a compliance report.

At the Twentieth Meeting of the Conference of the Parties (CoP20) to CITES, held from 24 November to 5 December 2025 in Samarkand, Uzbekistan, the CITES Standing Committee considered the Secretariat's earlier recommendation to examine a possible suspension of wildlife imports to India. Following discussion, the committee did not proceed with any trade-restrictive measures, noting the absence of findings indicating systemic non-compliance. Several Parties, including the United States, Japan, and Brazil, supported India's submission that further measures would be premature pending continued review.

A Secretariat note circulated during the meeting referred to the facilities operated by Vantara as having modern infrastructure and veterinary capacity, and noted India's "Category 1" status under CITES, indicating the existence of comprehensive national wildlife legislation. The committee stated that India's compliance would continue to be monitored through periodic reporting and documentation submitted to CITES authorities.

=== Muzzling of free press coverage ===
Following reports on concerns raised by the WAPFSA, several Indian media outlets have taken down their articles on the matter. Outlets such as Deccan Herald, The Telegraph (India), and The Tribune (India) removed their stories without explanation, while others like The Financial Express (India) replaced critical pieces with promotional content. Some media organizations, including Northeast Now and Vartha Bharati, reported receiving threatening emails and offers of financial incentives to delete or modify their coverage.

In October 2025, an investigation by The News Minute and Newslaundry uncovered an organized campaign to suppress critical coverage. The report identified a fraudulent entity operating as "Aspire Law Firm," which used the stolen identity of a prominent Indian cyber law expert to send spoofed legal threats and copyright takedown notices to journalists in Africa, Brazil, Germany, and India. Additionally, fake emails appearing to come from "Google Legal Support" were used to intimidate publishers into deleting investigative articles.

=== Allegations of the use of animals for private display and entertainment ===
During the wedding of Anant Ambani and Radhika Merchant, allegations against Vantara suggest that it may have violated these guidelines by hosting high-profile guests as a part of pre-wedding festivities such as Mark Zuckerberg, Bill Gates, and Ivanka Trump, with instances like Ivanka posing with an elephant, which critics argue prioritises prestige over animal welfare. While Vantara claims these tours are educational and approved by the Central Zoo Authority under the Wild Life (Protection) Act, 1972 and Recognition of Zoo Rules, 2009, the absence of concrete evidence indicating animal stress or exploitation means no formal violation has been documented. Nevertheless, the optics raise ethical concerns regarding adherence to the CZA’s mandate to prohibit entertainment-focused use of animals.

=== Fake legal notices and impersonation ===
An investigative report by the German periodical that was published in March 2025 by journalists Christoph Cadenbach and five others was translated to English and posted on Scribd. The translation was taken down by Scribd, for being an alleged copyright violation, in response to an email impersonating a legal agency claiming to be working for Süddeutsche Zeitung. Notices were sent to many other media organisations hosting reports critical of Vantara which were sent from a law firm with a fake website that had been created in August 2025. Fake emails appearing to be sent by the legal team of Google were also sent to some outlets.

=== Allegations of "vanity project" and lack of public access ===
Vantara has been criticised as a "vanity project" due to its lack of public access. The initiative has also faced criticism and controversy surrounding the alleged unethical sourcing of animals and their use in private exhibitions and entertainment.

=== Mahadevi elephant relocation ===
In July 2025, the relocation of an ailing elephant named Mahadevi to Vantara sparked significant controversy. The elephant had been kept at a Jain temple in the town of Kolhapur, Maharashtra, for three decades before being moved to Vantara following a high court order. The transfer led to "angry protests" in Maharashtra on August 3, 2025. Thousands of protestors threatened to boycott Reliance's Jio Telecom services. In response to the criticism, the state's chief minister announced that the government would file a review petition in the Supreme Court seeking to have Mahadevi returned. Vantara and PETA continued to show support for the transfer of Mahadevi to rehabilitative services.

=== Other investigations ===
In May 2026, Brazil police siege devices in a animal trafficking probe linked to Vantara. They suspect an American man being involved in the purchase of illegally traded animals for the zoo.

== In popular media ==
In November 2025, a six-part documentary series titled Vantara: Sanctuary Stories premiered on JioHotstar. Hosted by wildlife biologist Forrest Galante, the series documented the facility's rescue operations, veterinary infrastructure, and animal rehabilitation work.

Argentine football player Lionel Messi visited the Vantara wildlife rescue and conservation centre in Jamnagar, Gujarat, on December 16, 2025.

== See also ==
- Aravalli Great Wall of India
- Dubai Safari Park
- Gurgram Safari Park, largest in the world
- Great Green Wall
