= Dolly Jain =

Saree and dupatta draper

- Born: Ranchi, Jharkhand
- Website: dollyjain.com

Dolly Jain is a saree and dupatta draper in Kolkata.

== Early life ==
Dolly Jain was born in Ranchi, Jharkhand. She grew up in Bengaluru, Karnataka.

== Career ==
Dolly Jain became interested in saree draping after her marriage, when she was required to wear a saree herself. She learnt a variety of draping styles and taught them to other women, and was also asked to help brides with the draping of their wedding saree. Designer Sandeep Khosla recommended her to celebrity clients, and she eventually decided to pursue it as a career.

In 2019, she submitted a record to the Limca Book of Records, and was credited for draping a saree in 325 different ways and taking as low as 18.5 seconds to drape a saree. She draped the wedding outfits of Sonam Kapoor, Deepika Padukone, Priyanka Chopra, and Isha Ambani.
