= Gordhandas Bhagwandas Narottamdas =

Indian doctor

- Born: 1887
- Died: 1975 (aged 87–88)
- Other name: Gordhanbapa
- Occupations: Physician; social worker
- Spouse: Madanbahen
- Awards: Padma Shri (1965)

Gordhandas Bhagwandas Narottamdas (1887 – 1975) was an Indian physician and social worker from Bombay (now Mumbai), India. He founded the Sir Harkisandas Narottamdas Hospital in 1925 and served patients until his death. He was awarded the Padma Shri in 1965.

== Biography ==
Gordhandas was born in 1887 to Viththaldas Sheth. He was adopted by his maternal aunt Zaverben after death of his maternal uncle Bhagwandas Narottamdas Sheth. He studied medicine. During his college days, he married Madanbahen, a daughter of Laldas Vanraodas. After few years, she died of sickness. After death of his paternal uncle Harkisan Narottamdas, he proposed to build a hospital in his memory which was agreed by his maternal aunt Mankunwar and she donated their bungalow for the purpose. Her adoptive mother too agreed to donate.

In 1918, the foundation of Sir Harkisandas Narottamdas Hospital (also spelled Hurkisondas Nurrotumdas Hospital) was laid by the Lady Willingdon. In 1925, the construction was completed and inaugurated by Leslie Wilson, the Governor of Bombay. His brother Sir Mangaldas Sipai, the judge of Bombay High Court, held the position of honorary secretary of the hospital. The hospital started with 40 beds and eventually expanded to 366 beds; half of them were reserved for free treatment of poor and middle class patients. He was fondly called Gordhanbapa and served patients there until his death in 1975.

== Recognition ==
Gordhandas was awarded the Padma Shri for his social work in 1965. After his death, Bombay Municipal Corporation named a square on the crossroads of Sardar Vallabhbhai Road and Raja Rammohan Roy Road after him as Gordhanbapa Chowk (18.957993°N 72.819831°E). A bust was also erected at the hospital.

Sir Harkishandas Narottamdas Hospital is now known as Sir H. N. Reliance Foundation Hospital and is managed by the Reliance Foundation.
