= Vaishali Harin Gohil =

Gujarati lagna geet singer (born 1972)

- વૈશાલી હરિન ગોહિલ
- Vaishali Harin Gohil performing Lagan Geet
- Born: May 28, 1972 (age 54); Bardoli, Gujarat, India.
- Occupation: Singer
- Known for: Gujarati folk music, Lagna geet
- Spouse: Harin Gohil
- Children: 2
- Website: https://vaishaliharingohil.com

Vaishali Harin Gohil (Gujarati: વૈશાલી હરિન ગોહિલ; born 28 May 1972) is an Indian Gujarati folk singer known for performing traditional lagna geet. She has performed at the engagement ceremony of Anant Ambani and Radhika Merchant.

== Career ==
Gohil was involved in beauty services, handicrafts, tailoring, boutique work and other small business activities before pursuing music professionally. She later operated a brooch-manufacturing business and worked in the financial sector. She also ran a sub-brokerage office with her husband Harin Gohil under the name Saptam Investment until 2011.

Gohil began learning classical music at the age of 13. She began performing as a chorus singer during Navratri events and later pursued a full-time career in Gujarati folk music at around the age of 38.

Gohil is known for performing traditional Gujarati lagna geet, or wedding songs. She founded the VR1 Event Company in 2014 and created Mahasaptapadi, a musical production that brought 108 artists together on a single stage.

Vaishali Harin Gohil with Nita Ambani at Antilia, Mumbai, during Ganesh darshan.

In 2023, Gohil performed traditional Gujarati wedding songs at two events associated with the engagement and wedding ceremonies of Anant Ambani and Radhika Merchant. She performed at their engagement ceremony and later returned to perform at their traditional haldi ceremony, known as Pithi Vidhi, with both events held at Antilia, the Mumbai residence of the Ambani family.

As per BBC Gujarati and Divya Bhaskar, Gohil was invited to perform after one of her wedding-song performances attracted the attention of Nita Ambani.

In 2026, Gohil became a member of the Indian Singers' and Musicians' Rights Association. The membership followed a copyright dispute over the unauthorised distribution of recordings of her performances.

== Personal life ==
Gohil was born on 28 May 1972 in Bardoli, Gujarat, India. Her parents were Narendrabhai Shah, a lecturer, and Nayanaben Shah, a schoolteacher. She married Harin Gohil in 1990, and they have two daughters, Riddhima and Anjali. The family later settled in Surat.

She studied at Balaji Girls School and Parsi Patel School in Surat. She later studied commerce and music at T. & T. V. School and enrolled at K. P. Commerce College, but did not complete her college education following her marriage.

== Copyright dispute ==
Gohil was involved in a copyright dispute concerning the alleged unauthorised distribution of recordings of her performances. Rajkot-based music company uploaded 29 videos of her performances to YouTube and a similar number of audio recordings to online music platforms without her consent. The dispute was resolved through an out-of-court settlement, following videos and audio recordings were removed from the relevant platforms.

Following the dispute, Gohil became a member of the Indian Singers' and Musicians' Rights Association (ISAMRA), a copyright society that administers performers' rights and royalties for singers.

== See also ==
- Music of Gujarat
