= Leon Dmochowski =

Ukrainian American researcher

Dr Leon Dmochowski
- Леон Дмоховський
- Born: Leontii-Liudomyr Dmochowski; July 1, 1909; Ternopil, Russian Empire (now Ukraine)
- Died: August 26, 1981 (aged 72); Mexico City, Mexico
- Resting place: Houston, United States
- Other name: Leontyn Dmochowski
- Citizenship: American
- Known for: first to discover viruses in leukemia and malignant tumors
- Spouse: Sheila
- Children: 1
- Scientific career
- Fields: viral oncology, immunology, serology, endocrinology
- Workplaces: MD Anderson Cancer Center at the University of Texas, Houston

Leon Dmochowski (1 July 1909 – 26 August 1981, born Leontii-Liudomyr Dmochowski) (Note: Ukrainian: Леонтій-Людомир Дмоховський, romanized: Leontii-Liudomyr Dmokhovskyi) was a Ukrainian-American researcher and professor of viral oncology. A pioneer in the use of electron microscopy, he was the first to establish the viral nature of cancerous tumors.

== Biography ==
Leon Domochowski was born Leontii-Liudomyr Dmochowski in 1909 into a Greek Catholic priestly family, in the city of Ternopil, (Ukraine; at that time Austrian crown land of Galicia). In 1927 he graduated from the Ukrainian Gymnasium for boys in Przemyśl. Between 1928 and 1933 he studied at the Faculty of Medicine at Lviv University, where he gained a bachelor's degree. He moved to Warsaw, Poland, and between 1934 and 1935 he worked as a general practitioner at the Lviv University clinic.

From 1935 to 1938, he was a research assistant in the cancer laboratory of the Polish State Institute of Hygiene, Department of Bacteriology and experimental Medicine in Professor Ludwik Hirszfeld's laboratory. In 1937 he received a Doctorate of Medicine from the University of Warsaw.

After obtaining a one-year traveling fellowship, Dmochowski moved to London in 1938, working at the Institute of Cancer Research. During this period he published a number of scientific papers on cancer studies in various medical journals. In 1946 he moved to Leeds, where he worked as a researcher and lecturer in the Department of Experimental Pathology and Cancer Research at the School of Medicine, University of Leeds. In 1949 he received a second Doctorate of Medicine from the University of Leeds.

In 1951 he moved to the United States, engaging in research in the field of immunology, tumor serology, virology, genetics, and endocrinology. In 1953 he was one of the first to discover the viral origin of malignant tumors. From 1954, he was the head of the Department of Virology and Electron Microscopy at the MD Anderson Cancer Center, University of Texas, Houston. There, he led a team of experts in major research projects on the link between viruses and cancer.

Between 1953 and 1954 Dmochowski was a visiting associate professor of microbiology at the Columbia University Vagelos College of Physicians and Surgeons in New York. From 1949 to 1955 he was an adviser to the United Nations Relief and Rehabilitation Administration (UNRRA)

In 1971 Dmochowski and his colleagues grew quantities of virus from cells taken from a cancer patient, which at the time, was considered a significant development in the cancer-viruses inquiry.

Dmochowski was author and co-author of more than 450 scientific papers in the field of immunology, serology, endocrinology, virology and their relationship with experimental and clinical oncology. A pioneer in the use of electron microscopy in viral oncology, he was the first to discover viruses in leukemia and malignant tumors of the breast of mice. Subsequent experiments have shown the presence of such viruses in humans. He expressed original views and applied methods to study the relationship between viruses and cancer.

He authored sections in the books: Advances in Cancer Research (1953), Cancer (1957), Diseases of Poultry (1959; 1969), and The Book of Health (1963).

Most oncology virologists in the world were students of Dr. Dmohovsky or professionally formed under his influence; Japanese scientists of the time almost all improved their knowledge under his leadership. Consultant to the US Cancer Institute and academic and research institutions, honorary member of American and international organizations. He has been honored with numerous awards and honorary academic degrees. Longtime member of the Ukrainian Medical Society of North America and the Shevchenko Scientific Society.

He died in Mexico City, while on vacation, and is buried in Memorial Oaks Cemetery, in Houston — his home town.
