= Nita Mukesh Ambani Cultural Centre =

Cultural and exhibition space in Mumbai, India

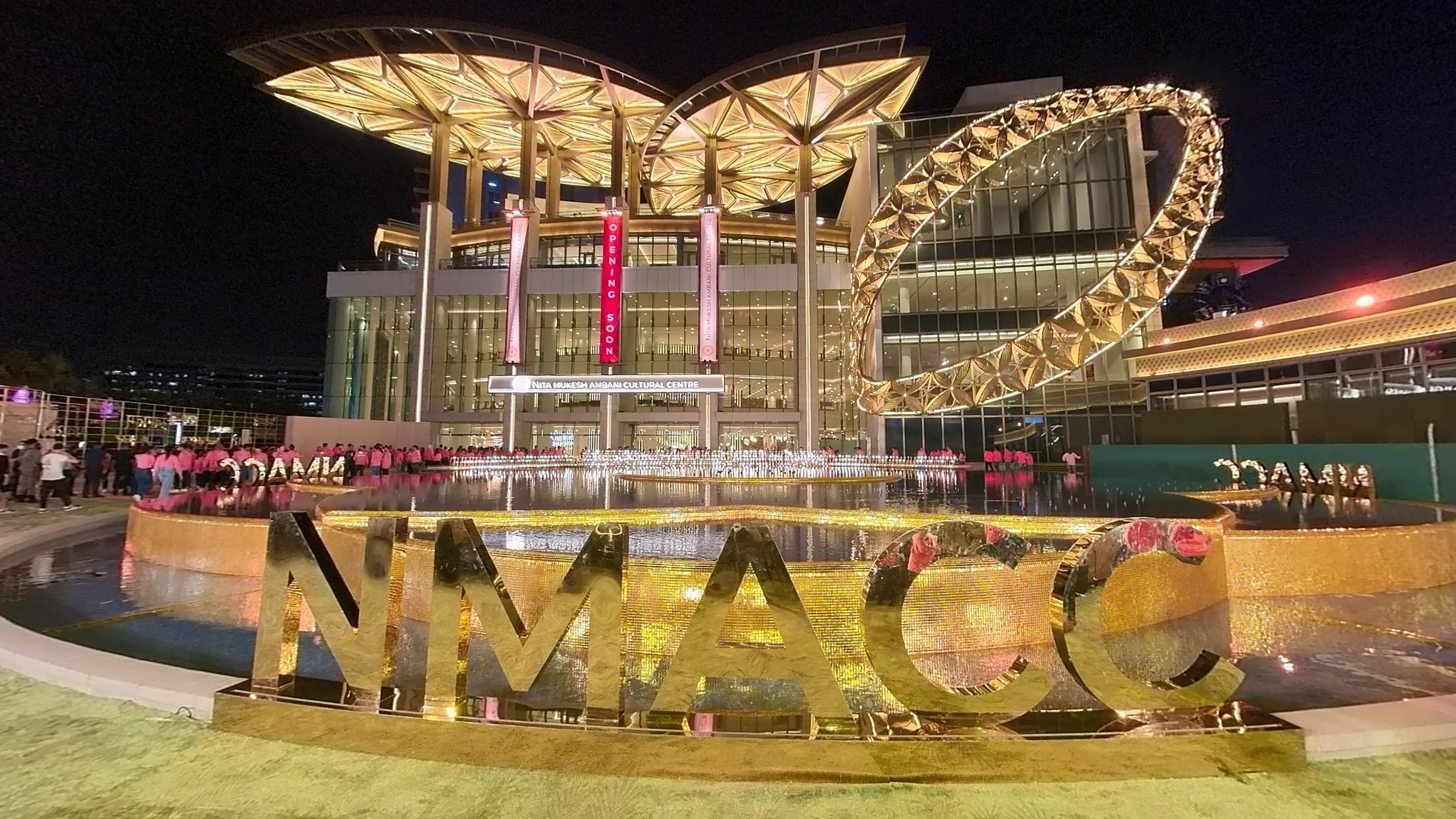
- Nita Mukesh Ambani Cultural Centre at night
- Interactive map of Nita Mukesh Ambani Cultural Centre
- Address: Mumbai; India
- Location: G Block, Bandra Kurla Complex, Mumbai 400 098, India
- Owner: Nita Ambani
- Capacity: 2000
- Type: Performing-arts center

Construction
- Built: 2023
- Opened: 31 March 2023
- Cost: ₹120 crores or $13 million (2023)
- Architect: TVS Design

Website
- nmacc.com

The Nita Mukesh Ambani Cultural Centre (NMACC) is a performing arts and multi-disciplinary cultural and exhibition space located in the city of Mumbai, India, that opened on 31 March 2023. The center was founded by Nita Ambani, philanthropist and chairperson of the Reliance Foundation, to "preserve and promote Indian arts." The estimated cost of the NMACC is around ₹ 120 Crores or $13 million (2023). It is part of the Jio World Centre complex in the Bandra Kurla Complex of Mumbai.

Since its opening, NMACC has been the home of music and theater performances, as well as Broadway-calibre productions. The opening of the Cultural Centre marked by the debut of the theatrical experience The Great Indian Musical: Civilisation to Nation, celebrating Indian dance, drama, music and art by playwright and director Feroz Abbas Khan. India's first major Broadway musical, The Sound of Music, was performed at NMACC on May 3, 2023.

== Facility ==
The centre consists of a number of spaces including:

- The Grand Theatre, a 2000-seat space across three levels to host major traveling productions. It claims to be the "most technologically advanced theatre in India" and incorporates more than 8,400 Swarovski crystals in its design. The theatre was designed with special absorbent wood to reduce audio reflections.
- The Studio Theatre, a 250-seat space that features telescopic seating and the ability to transform for different events. It uses a tension wire grid for rigging and lighting, said to be the first-of-its-kind in India.
- The Cube, a small 125-seat space with moveable stage and seating, used for small-scale performances.
- The Art House, a four-storey dedicated art complex consisting of 16,000 sq. ft. of floor space.

== Public art ==
The building hosts several prominent public art installations including:

1. Kamal Kunj – One of the largest commissioned Pichwai paintings at 56 feet tall, with depictions of seasonal festivities.
2. Clouds – A 90-piece set of stainless steel structure mirrors by Yayoi Kusama, displayed on the ground.
3. Seekers Paradise – An installation art piece by N. S. Harsha.
4. Closet Quarries I & II – A painting by Reena Kallat using rubber stamps, reflecting the names of craftsmen and symbols seen in Mughal monuments.
5. Earth's Whisper – A work by Jagannath Panda around the idea ‘Contribution is Growth’.
6. Mechanism 12 – A work by Tanya Goel uses pigments from the sites of architectural demolitions in and around Delhi.
7. City Obscure – Vibha Galhotra’s cityscape of Mumbai takes up an entire wall and is made from leitmotif ghungroos, small ankle bells in Indian culture.
8. Arboretum I – A work by artist duo Thukral & Tagra, comprising illustrations of over 60 floral species from across India.

== History ==
=== Broadway productions visiting India through NMACC ===
No.	Production	Opening Date	Closing Date
1	The Sound of Music	3 May 2023	25 June 2023
2	West Side Story	16 August 2023	27 August 2023
3	Mamma Mia!	29 November 2023	7 January 2024
4	Matilda the Musical	16 May 2024	2 June 2024
5	The Little Prince	25 September 2024	29 September 2024
6	Life of Pi	5 December 2024	15 December 2024
7	The Phantom of the Opera	5 March 2025	30 March 2025
8	The Nutcracker on Ice	4 December 2025	14 December 2025
9	Wicked	12 March 2026	29 March 2026
