= Sir H. N. Reliance Foundation Hospital =

Hospital in South Mumbai, India

Coordinates: 18.958744°N 72.81985°E

Sir H. N. Reliance Foundation Hospital & Research Centre
- Hurkisondas Hospital
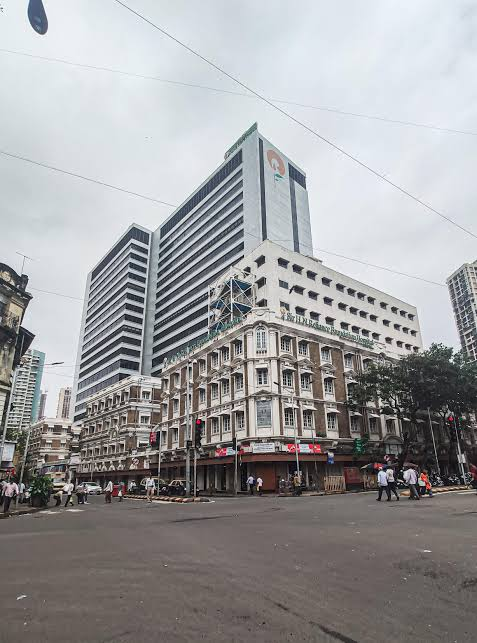
- Respect for Life

Geography
- Location: Mumbai, Maharashtra, India

Organisation
- Care system: Private
- Type: Charitable
- Affiliated university: Reliance Foundation

Services
- Standards: Tertiary Care
- Emergency department: Available
- Beds: 345

History
- Former name: Sir Hurkisondas Nurrotumdas Hospital
- Opened: 1925; 101 years ago

Links
- Website: www.rfhospital.org
- Lists: Hospitals in India

Sir H. N. Reliance Foundation Hospital and Research Centre is located in Girgaon, Mumbai, India and managed by Reliance Foundation. It was founded in 1925 by Gordhandas Bhagwandas Narottamdas and was renovated and reopened in 2014. The hospital is primarily called "Hurkisondas Hospital" and "Reliance Hospital".

== History ==
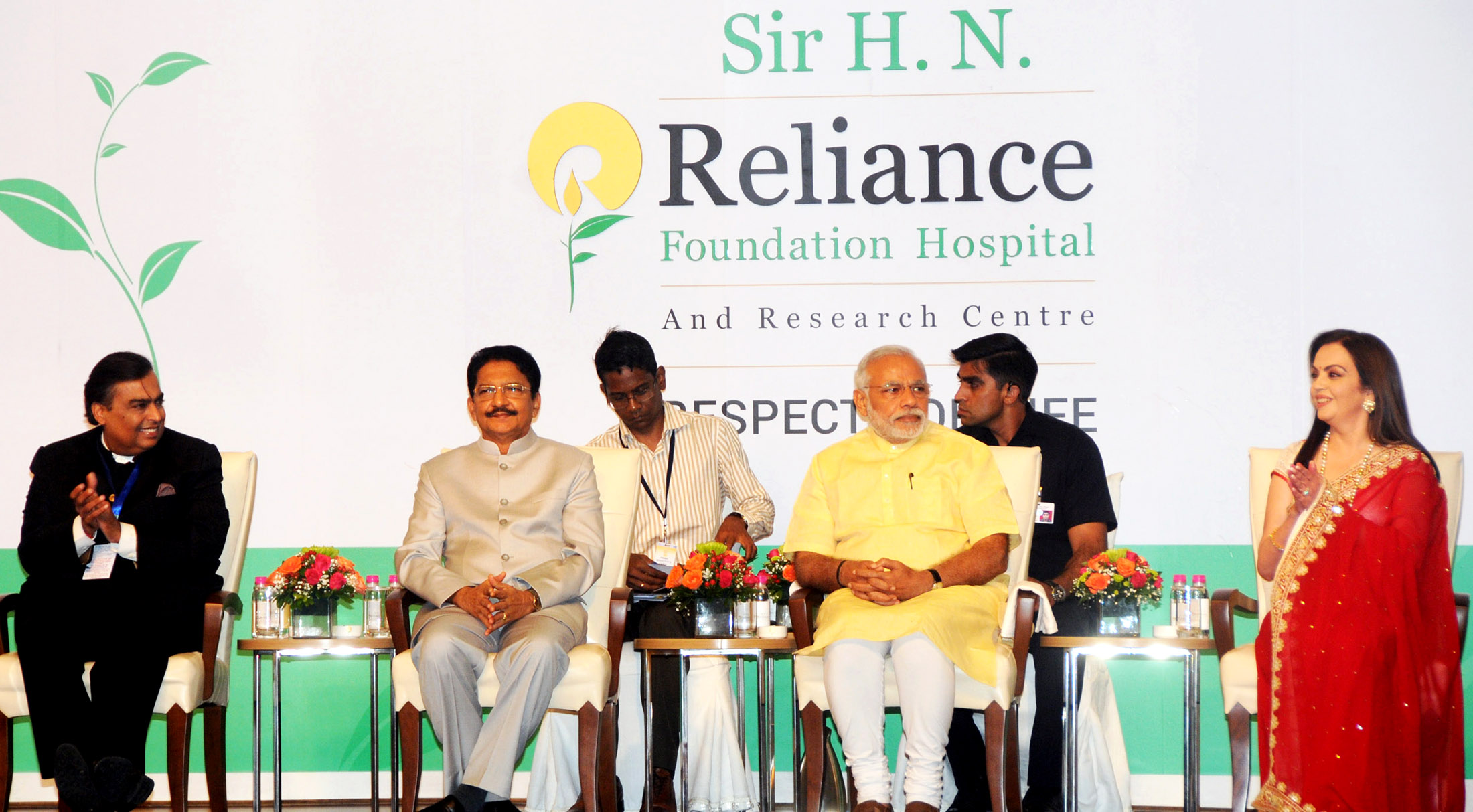
The Prime Minister Of India, Narendra Modi, at a ceremony held to rededicate Sir H. N. Reliance Foundation Hospital and Research Centre, in Mumbai on 25 October 2014. Mukesh Ambani, Nita Ambani and the then Governor Of Maharashtra, Shri C. Vidyasagar Rao, are also seen.

Gordhandas Bhagwandas Narottamdas, a physician and social worker, proposed the Harkisan Narottamdas Hospital (also spelt Hurkisondas Nurrotumdas Hospital) to his adoptive mother Zaverben and his aunt Mankunwar, wife of deceased Harkisan Narottamdas Sheth and they agreed and donated the bungalow and funds. In 1918, the Lady Willingdon, wife of the then Governor of Bombay, laid the hospital's foundation. In 1925, the construction was completed and inaugurated by Lesli Wilson, the Governor of Bombay. Gordhandas worked there until he died in 1975.

The hospital was taken over by the Reliance Foundation in 2006. The renovation of the heritage building and the building behind it started in 2011. After that, It was inaugurated and rededicated by the Indian Prime Minister Narendra Modi on 25 October 2014.

== Facilities ==
This centre has many facilities like

- emergency medical services
- the out-patient department
- in-patient services, diagnostics
- operation theatre complex
- an executive health check facility
- day care
- woman and child health
- intensive critical care
- isolation rooms

The hospital offers healthcare facilities pertaining to six key areas: Cardiac Sciences, Nephro-Urology, Neuro Sciences, Oncology, Orthopedics and spine and Woman and child Health. Over 258 consultants in various areas of specialization drive and manage the activities. They are assisted by a staff of 1,000, including paramedical and other support. The hospital also provides free and subsidized out-patient and in-patient treatment to the needy.
