= Sandeep Khosla =

Indian fashion designer

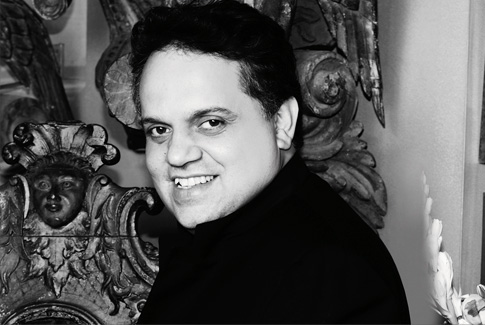
- Born: Kapurthala, Punjab, India
- Education: The Doon School
- Occupations: Fashion designer Interior designer
- Years active: 1986- present
- Known for: Fashion design
- Website: www.abusandeep.com

Sandeep Khosla is a noted Indian fashion designer, who co-owns the label, Abu Jani-Sandeep Khosla. He is best known for his ability to infuse Indian craftsmanship and textile heritage with European tailored silhouette. His signature is to combine traditional aesthetics with modern design.

In 2002, he along with Neeta Lulla, Abu Jani, and Reza Shariffi, won the National Film Award for Best Costume Design, for his work in the Bollywood film Devdas directed by Sanjay Leela Bhansali.

Many international stars have opted for Khosla's outfits for awards' night. In 2012, Judi Dench wore one of Khosla's designs to BAFTA, and has worn his outfits to other awards events. Khosla had designed outfits for The World Is Not Enough (1999).

Of late, Khosla has taken on several projects in interior design. He has designed interiors for hotels (such as The Sofala, Goa), restaurants (the Aish at the Park, Hyderabad), resorts and homes, and has even begun to event design for Indian weddings.

Khosla is known for employing diverse models, including transgender models, and designing for many body types. His designs often question gender binaries and expand ideas of what counts as “men’s fashion.”

== Biography ==
Born in Kapurthala, in a Punjabi family, Khosla studied at The Doon School before joining his family's leather and garment business. He completed his studies with college in Jalandhar, thereafter he studied for a year at a leather institute in Chennai, but left to move to Delhi. Here he started working as a buyer for an export house and eventually opened a small boutique, Limelight. However soon he shifted to Mumbai, and started working with a film costume designer, Xerxes Bhathena. Incidentally, Abu Jani had also assisted Bhatena for while, soon they met and decided to work together.

In 1986, they launched a boutique, Mata Hari. After their work was featured in a noted featured on the cover of the a noted Bombay magazine, they became one of the five designers to join Tarun Tahiliani for his multi-brand boutique Ensemble in 1987. Actress Dimple Kapadia became their first celebrity client, and in turn led to other noted clientele like Jaya Bachchan and Parmeshwar Godrej.

Their furniture line debuted at Bajaj Gallery in Mumbai in 1993.

In 2008, Khosla was appointed co-editor-in-chief of L'Officiel Hommes India alongside Abu Jani.

In 2012, the label Abhu Jani-Sandeep Khosla celebrated 25 years in fashion industry with a fashion show.

== See also ==
- Wedding lehenga of Radhika Merchant
