= Lagan Geet =

Traditional Gujarati wedding songs

Lagna geet
- Vaishali Harin Gohil performing Lagan Geet
- Native name: લગ્નગીત
- Stylistic origins: Gujarati folk music
- Cultural origins: Gujarat, India

Lagna Geet (Gujarati:લગ્નગીત) are traditional Gujarati wedding songs performed during wedding ceremonies and related rituals. It is commonly sung by family members, traditional singers and professional performers.

The songs often express blessings, happiness, affection, humour and emotions linked with marriage. Fattana, is also an humorous form of wedding song, is also associated with Gujarati wedding celebrations same as Lagan Geet.

== Notable singers ==
- Usha Chinoy
- Vaishali Harin Gohil
- Aishwarya Majmudar
- Bhoomi Trivedi
- Kajal Maheriya
- Himali Vyas Naik
