= Rashtriya Khel Protsahan Puraskar =

Indian award for promotion of sports

- Award given for promotion and development of sports in the country
- Sponsored by: Government of India
- First award: 2009
- Final award: 2024

Highlights
- Total awarded: 55

The Rashtriya Khel Protsahan Puraskar is a sports honour of the Republic of India. The name of the award in Hindi translates to National Sports Promotion Award. It is awarded annually by the Ministry of Youth Affairs and Sports. The award recognizes the "involvement of corporates, voluntary organizations, and sports control boards, in the promotion and development of sports in the country" over the previous three years. The award was started in 2009 and the guidelines were revised in 2015. Since the revision, entities in four categories are awarded: Identification and nurturing of budding and young talent, Encouragement to sports through corporate social responsibility, Employment of sportspersons and sports welfare measures, and Sports for development. As of 2020, the award comprises "a citation and a trophy in each of the categories".

As of 2024, a total of 55 awards have been bestowed on 42 different organizations and individuals. The award is presented annually with the other five National Sports Awards and national adventure award at the Presidential Palace presented by the President of India, usually on 29 August of a year. Five organizations have won the award more than once. Services Sports Control Board won the award in 2010 in two categories, and once in 2012 and 2013, for a total of four awards. Tata Steel won the award in 2009 in two categories and again once in 2010 for a total of three awards. Two awards have been won by Railways Sports Promotion Board in 2009 and 2012, Petroleum Sports Promotion Board in 2011 and 2013, and Oil and Natural Gas Corporation in 2014 and 2020. Awards in two categories—establishment and management of sports academies of excellence, and financial support for sports excellence—were discontinued as a result of the 2015 award scheme revision. In the year 2021 this awarde was given to the Manav Rachna Educational Institutions(MREI), an Organisation for their contribution in the Identification and nurturing of the sports talent of over the past 25 years around the various parts of India.

== List of recipients ==
List of Rashtriya Khel Protsahan Puraskar recipients, showing the year, category, and entity
Year	Category	Entity
2009	Employment of Sportspersons and Sports Welfare Measures	Railways Sports Promotion Board
2009	Establishment and Management of Sports Academies of Excellence	Tata Steel
2009	Identification and Nurturing of Budding and Young Talent	Tata Steel
2010	Employment of Sportspersons and Sports Welfare Measures	Services Sports Control Board
2010	Establishment and Management of Sports Academies of Excellence	Khel Evam Yuva Kalyan Vibhag
2010	Financial Support for Sports Excellence	Tata Steel
2010	Identification and Nurturing of Budding and Young Talent	Services Sports Control Board
2011	Establishment and Management of Sports Academies of Excellence	Narayana Ramachandran
2011	Financial Support for Sports Excellence	Petroleum Sports Promotion Board
2012	Employment of Sportspersons and Sports Welfare Measures	Air India Sports Promotion Board
2012	Establishment and Management of Sports Academies of Excellence	Services Sports Control Board
2012	Financial Support for Sports Excellence	Railways Sports Promotion Board
2012	Identification and Nurturing of Budding and Young Talent	Steel Authority of India
2013	Employment of Sportspersons and Sports Welfare Measures	Petroleum Sports Promotion Board
2013	Establishment and Management of Sports Academies of Excellence	Gopichand Badminton Academy
2013	Financial Support for Sports Excellence	Services Sports Control Board
2013	Identification and Nurturing of Budding and Young Talent	U. K. Mishra
2014	Employment of Sportspersons and Sports Welfare Measures	Oil and Natural Gas Corporation
2014	Establishment and Management of Sports Academies of Excellence	Guru Hanuman Akhara
2014	Identification and Nurturing of Budding and Young Talent	JSW Steel Ltd
2014	Sports for Development	Magic Bus India Foundation
2015	Employment of Sportspersons and Sports Welfare Measures	Haryana Police
2015	Encouragement to Sports through Corporate Social Responsibility	Coal India
2015	Identification and Nurturing of Budding and Young Talent	Directorate General of Military Training
2015	Sports for Development	Sports Coaching Foundation
2016	Employment of Sportspersons and Sports Welfare Measures	Reserve Bank of India
2016	Encouragement to Sports through Corporate Social Responsibility	India Infrastructure Finance Company Ltd
2016	Identification and Nurturing of Budding and Young Talent	Dadar Parsee Zorostrian Cricket Club
2016	Identification and Nurturing of Budding and Young Talent	Hockey Citizen Group
2016	Identification and Nurturing of Budding and Young Talent	STAIRS (Note: Society for Transformation, Inclusion and Recognition through Sports)
2016	Identification and Nurturing of Budding and Young Talent	Usha School Of Athletics
2016	Sports for Development	Subroto Mukerjee Sports Education Society
2017	Encouragement to Sports through Corporate Social Responsibility	Odisha Industrial Infrastructure Development Corporation
2017	Identification and Nurturing of Budding and Young Talent	Kendriya Vidyalaya Sangathan
2017	Sports for Development	Reliance Foundation
2017	Sports for Development	The Golf Foundation
2018	Encouragement to Sports through Corporate Social Responsibility	JSW Sports
2018	Identification and Nurturing of Budding and Young Talent	Rashtriya Ispat Nigam
2018	Sports for Development	Isha Outreach
2019	Identification and Nurturing of Budding and Young Talent	Gagan Narang Sports Promotion Foundation
2019	Identification and Nurturing of Budding and Young Talent	GoSports Foundation
2019	Sports for Development	Rayalaseema Development Trust
2020	Employment of Sportspersons and Sports Welfare Measures	Air Force Sports Control Board
2020	Encouragement to Sports through Corporate Social Responsibility	Oil and Natural Gas Corporation
2020	Identification and Nurturing of Budding and Young Talent	Army Sports Institute
2020	Identification and Nurturing of Budding and Young Talent	Lakshya Institute
2020	Sports for Development	International Institute of Sports Management
2021	Identification and nurturing of the sports talent over the past 25 years	Manav Rachna Educational Institutions(MREI)
2021	Encouragement to Sports through Corporate Social Responsibility	Oil and Natural Gas Corporation
2022	Identification and Nurturing of Budding and Young Talent	TransStadia Enterprises Private Limited
2022	Encouragement to Sports through Corporate Social Responsibility	Kalinga Institute of Industrial Technology
2022	Sports for Development	Ladakh Ski & Snowboard Association
2023	Identification and nurturing of budding / young talent	Jain University, Bengaluru
2023	Encouragement to sports through Corporate Social Responsibility	Odisha Mining Corporation
2024	Sports for Development	Physical Education Foundation of India
