= BBC Gujarati =

BBC Gujarati બીબીસી ગુજરાતી
- Type: website
- Country: United Kingdom
- Availability: International
- Endowment: Foreign and Commonwealth Office, UK
- Owner: BBC
- Launch date: 2 October 2017
- Official website: www.bbc.com/gujarati/
- Language: Gujarati

BBC Gujarati (Gujarati: બીબીસી ગુજરાતી) is an international news service by BBC in the Gujarati language. It was launched on 2 October 2017. The service is being operated on websites and social networking sites. The launch is part of the World Service's biggest expansion since the 1940s, following a government funding boost announced in 2016.

According to the official website of the BBC, Gujarati is spoken by 50 million people, and hence it is the 26th most used language in the world.

== See also ==
- BBC World Service
- BBC Punjabi
- BBC Urdu
