= Nita Ambani =

Indian philanthropist and businesswoman

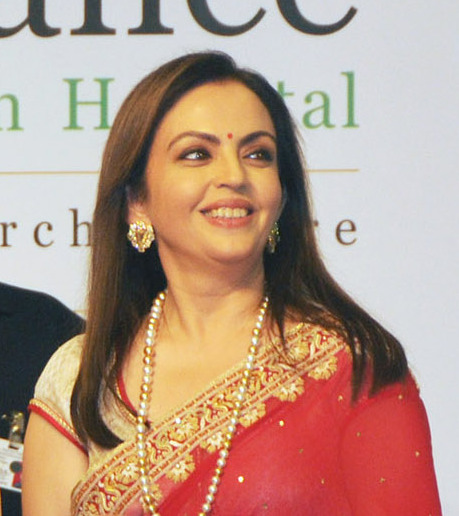
- Nita in 2014
- Born: Nita Ravindra Dalal; 1 November 1963 (age 62); Bombay, India
- Education: Narsee Monjee College of Commerce and Economics
- Occupations: Businesswoman; Philanthropist
- Organisation: Reliance Foundation NMACC
- Spouse: Mukesh Ambani (m. 1985)
- Relatives: Dhirubhai Ambani (father-in-law); Anil Ambani (brother-in-law)
- Awards: Rashtriya Khel Protsahan Puruskar (2017)

Nita Mukesh Ambani (née Ravindra Dalal; born 1 November 1963) is an Indian businesswoman and philanthropist. She is the chairperson and founder of the Reliance Foundation, Dhirubhai Ambani International School and a director of Reliance Industries. She is married to Reliance Industries Limited's chairman and managing director Mukesh Ambani. With a family fortune estimated in excess of US$113.5 billion (November 2025), the Ambanis are among the richest in the world. She is also an art collector and the owner of the Indian Premier League cricket team Mumbai Indians. amb In 2016, she was listed as one of the 'fifty high and mighty Indians' by India Today and in 'the most influential women business leaders in Asia' list by Forbes. She became the first Indian woman to become a member of the International Olympic Committee (IOC) in 2016.

Nita Ambani was a co-chair and board member of the Mumbai Academy of the Moving Image during Jio's sponsorship of the organisation from 2015 to 2024. In 2023, she launched the Nita Mukesh Ambani Cultural Centre in Mumbai.

== Early life ==
Nita Ravindra Dalal was born on 1 November 1964 in Bombay to Gujarati parents, Purnima and Ravindrabhai Dalal, and grew up middle class in the suburbs. She completed her bachelor's degree in commerce from Narsee Monjee College of Commerce and Economics, and took up Bharatnatyam from an early age and grew to become a professional Bharatanatyam dancer.

Her sister, Mamta Dalal, who works as a school teacher is known to teach Sachin Tendulkar and Shah Rukh Khan's children.

== Career ==
Nita Mukesh Ambani is the founder and chairperson of Reliance Foundation, the corporate social responsibility arm of Reliance Industries. In 2014 she was elected to the board of Reliance Industries. Ambani is also an art collector. In August 2023, Nita Ambani resigned from her position on the board of directors of Reliance Industries (RIL), while retaining her role as the Chairperson of the Reliance Foundation. The RIL Board accepted her resignation, acknowledging her commitment to steer the Reliance Foundation towards greater societal transformation. Nita Ambani will continue to attend all RIL Board meetings as a permanent invitee.

=== Jamnagar Township Project ===
In 1997, Ambani was involved in the project of building a company township for the employees of Reliance's refinery at Jamnagar. The project involved establishing a tree-lined and environmentally-friendly colony to house more than 17,000 residents. The project, particularly the refinery complex, has faced scrutiny over worker safety and conditions, following incidents including fatal accidents, worker deaths, and unrest.

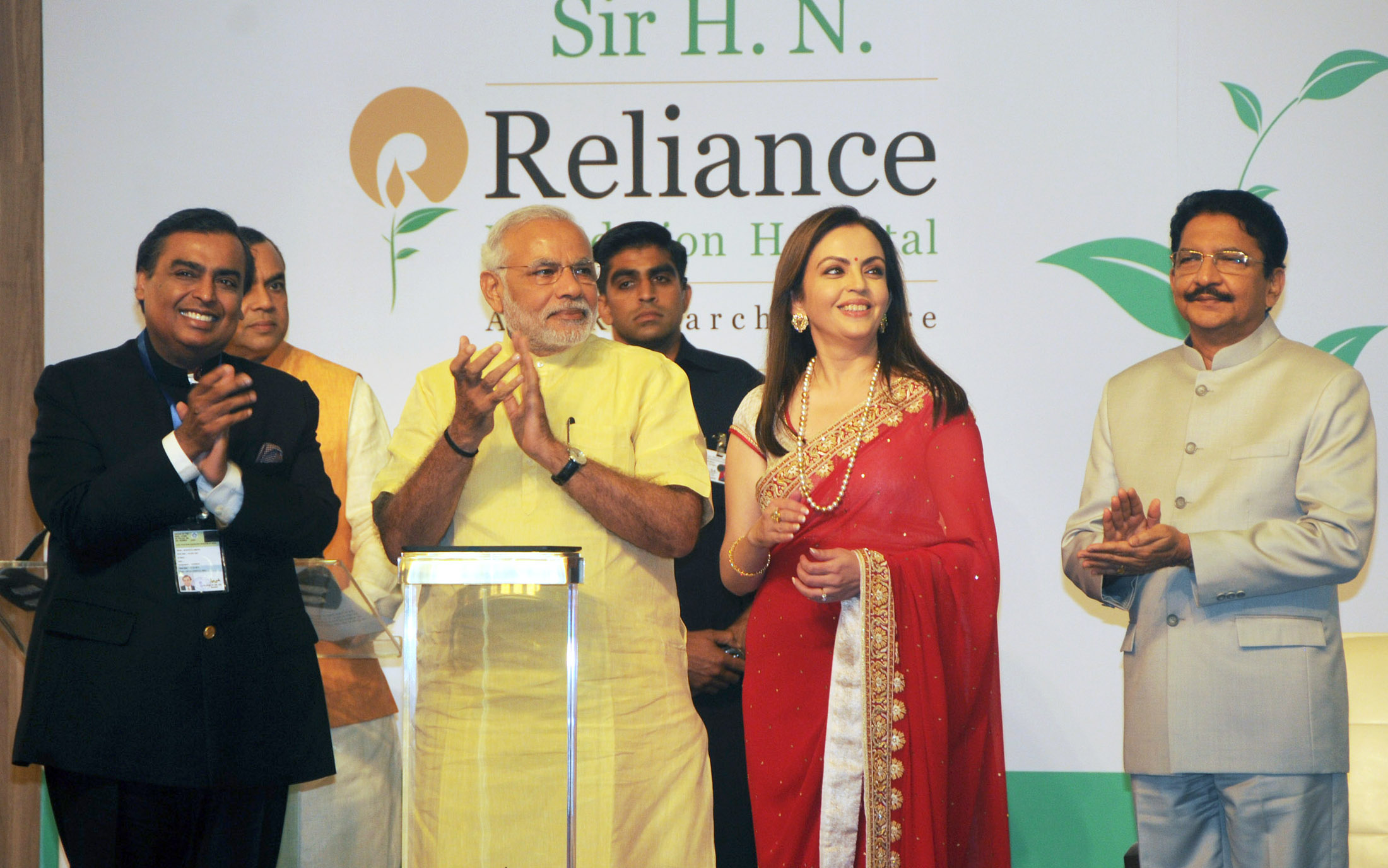
Nita with Indian prime minister Narendra Modi rededicating Sir H.N. Reliance Foundation Hospital and Research Centre in 2014

=== Reliance Foundation ===
Reliance Foundation is an Indian philanthropic initiative founded in 2010 by Nita Ambani. Reliance Industries is a patron of the organization.

=== Mumbai Indians ===
Ambani is the co-owner of Indian Premier League (IPL) team, Mumbai Indians which won the title in 2013, 2015, 2017, 2019 and 2020. She led the ‘Education and sports for All’ (ESA) initiative as part of Mumbai Indians' way of giving back to society. ESA has reached over 100,000 underprivileged children and created awareness for education using various media and digital platforms.

=== Dhirubhai Ambani International School ===
Ambani is the founder of the Dhirubhai Ambani International School which has been ranked among the best schools in Resources & Services.

=== IOC membership ===
On 4 June 2016, Ambani was among eight candidates nominated for membership in the International Olympic Committee (IOC) by the Swiss-based panel. The election of these new members was held during the 129th IOC Session in the first week of August 2016. Ambani was elected as a member of the IOC on 4 August 2016, its first Indian woman member.

=== Jio World Centre ===
Reliance Industries on 4 March 2022 announced the opening of the first phase of the Jio World Centre in Mumbai's Bandra Kurla Complex.

=== Her Circle ===
Her Circle is a digital platform for women complete with its own discussion panels and social networking app. Reliance Foundation’s Nita Mukesh Ambani has launched ‘Her Circle’ on the occasion of International Women's Day, 8 March 2022. The new initiative aims to fuel women empowerment with modern, digital tools. Launching for Indian women but extending its service to all women overseas, Her Circle will provide the ladies a "joyful and safe space for interaction, engagement, collaboration, and mutual support." "When women lean on women, incredible things happen," Ambani said at the launch. "Whether it is the women from Reliance Foundation or the national and international women leaders that I have worked with, our shared experiences show me that in the end our struggles and triumphs resonate with each other," she adds.

=== Nita Mukesh Ambani Cultural Centre (NMACC) ===
Nita Mukesh Ambani Cultural Centre (NMACC), housed within the Jio World Centre in Mumbai's Bandra-Kurla Complex (BKC) was launched by her on 31 March 2023. The idea behind the centre is to focus on community programmes such as school and college outreach and competitions, awards for Arts teachers, in-residency Guru-shishya programs, and art literacy programs for adults among other things.

The four-storey NMACC will contain 16,000 square feet (1,500 m^{2}) of purpose-built exhibition space and three theatres. The largest of these, a 2,000-seat Grand Theatre, will include an extraordinary and unique lotus-themed chandelier with 8,400 Swarovski crystals.

There are three dedicated spaces for the performing arts The Grand Theatre, The Studio Theatre and The Cube. The centre will also launch the Art House, a four-storey space to spotlight leading Indian and international artists.

== Personal life ==
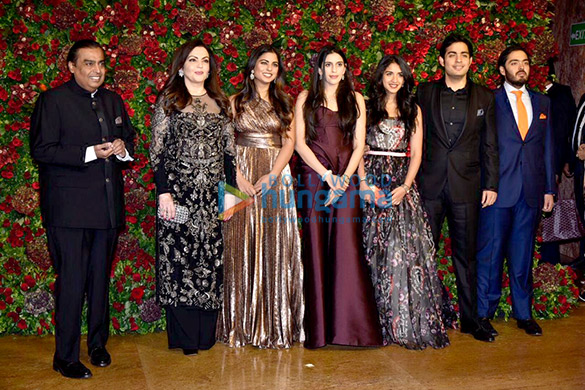
The Ambani family at the reception of Deepika Padukone and Ranveer Singh in 2018

She met Mukesh Ambani when she was a school teacher and married him in 1985. After marriage, she worked as a teacher for a few years. Nita lives in the skyscraper private building, Antilia, which is also the second-most luxurious and expensive house in the world.

They have two sons and a daughter; the elder two, twins, were born via IVF seven years after Nita and Mukesh's marriage. She conceived her younger son, Anant naturally, three years after the twins' birth. She is the grandmother of four toddlers.

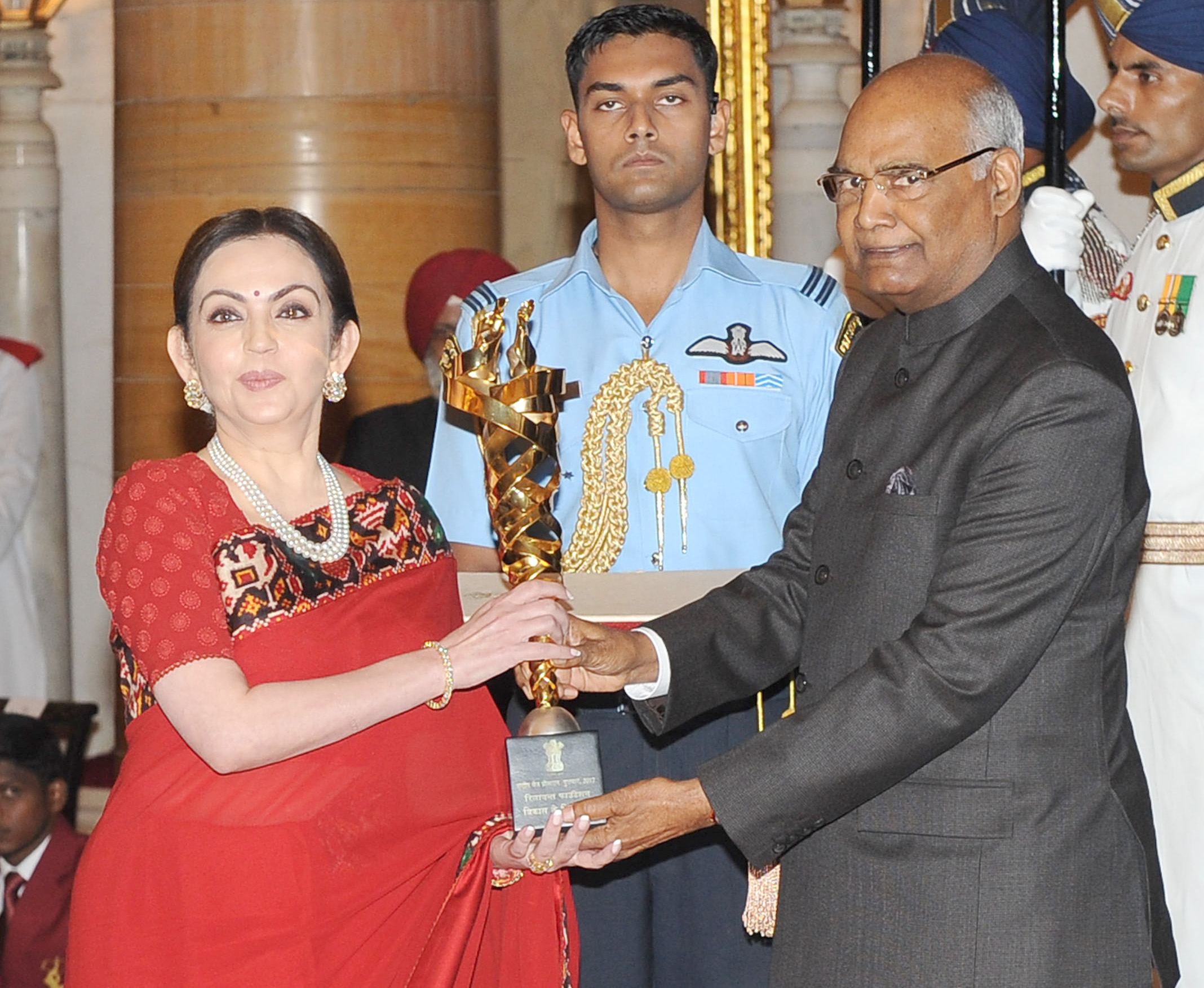
Nita Ambani being awarded the Rashtriya Khel Protsahan Award 2017 by then President of India, Shri Ram Nath Kovind

== Awards ==
- Ambani was conferred the Rashtriya Khel Protsahan Award 2017 by Ram Nath Kovind, the then president of India.
- She is the recipient of the Best Corporate Supporter of Indian Sports award, conferred by Times of India Sports Awards in 2018.
- She was conferred with Miss World Humanitarian Award in 2024.
