= Reliance Foundation =

Private non-profit organization by Reliance Industries Ltd

- Founded: 2010; 16 years ago
- Founder: Nita Ambani; Mukesh Ambani
- Type: non-profit organization
- Purpose: urban planning; rural development; disaster response; crisis management; nutrition; education; healthcare; sports (Reliance Foundation Youth Sports)
- Location: Mumbai, Maharashtra, India
- Owner: Reliance Industries
- Key people: Nita Dalal Ambani (Chairperson and Managing Director)
- Website: reliancefoundation.org
- Formerly called: Dhirubhai Ambani Foundation

Reliance Foundation is an Indian non-profit organisation which was founded in 2010 by Mukesh Ambani. It is wholly owned by Reliance Industries Limited and is one of the largest non-profit foundations in the country.

== History ==
Reliance Foundation was formerly known as Dhirubhai Ambani Foundation. It was founded in 2010 by Mukesh Ambani, chairperson of Reliance Industries.

== Purpose and activities ==
The foundation's objective is to promote sustainable growth in India. It does so in the following spheres:

- Rural transformation: The Bharat-India Jodo is a programme for marginal farmers, and the foundation also has information service programmes bringing technical expertise to 1,400 farming and fishing villages.
- Education: The foundation grants scholarships under the Dhirubhai Ambani Scholarship Programme, which started in Maharashtra and Gujarat in 1996 and was extended nationwide in 2009. It also supports 13 schools, including the Dhirubhai Ambani International School, and establishes universities in partnership with the London School of Economics.
- Health: The foundation sponsors the Drishti program, which provides newspapers in Braille for the blind and the country's largest cornea transplant programme, and developed the Sir H. N. Reliance Foundation Hospital and Research Centre in Mumbai.
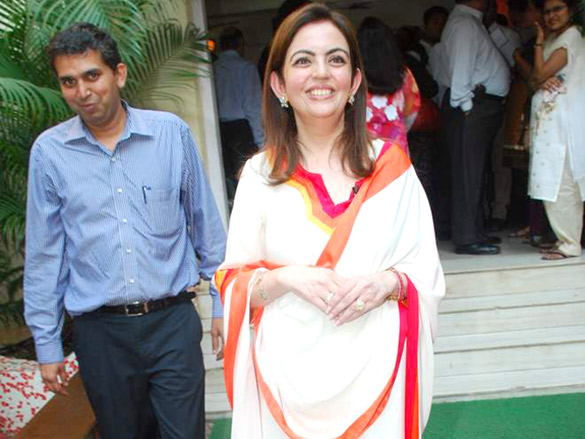
  Mrs Nita Dalal Ambani during the launch of India's first registered Braille newspaper in Hindi 'Drishti' by Reliance Foundation in Mumbai on March 19, 2012
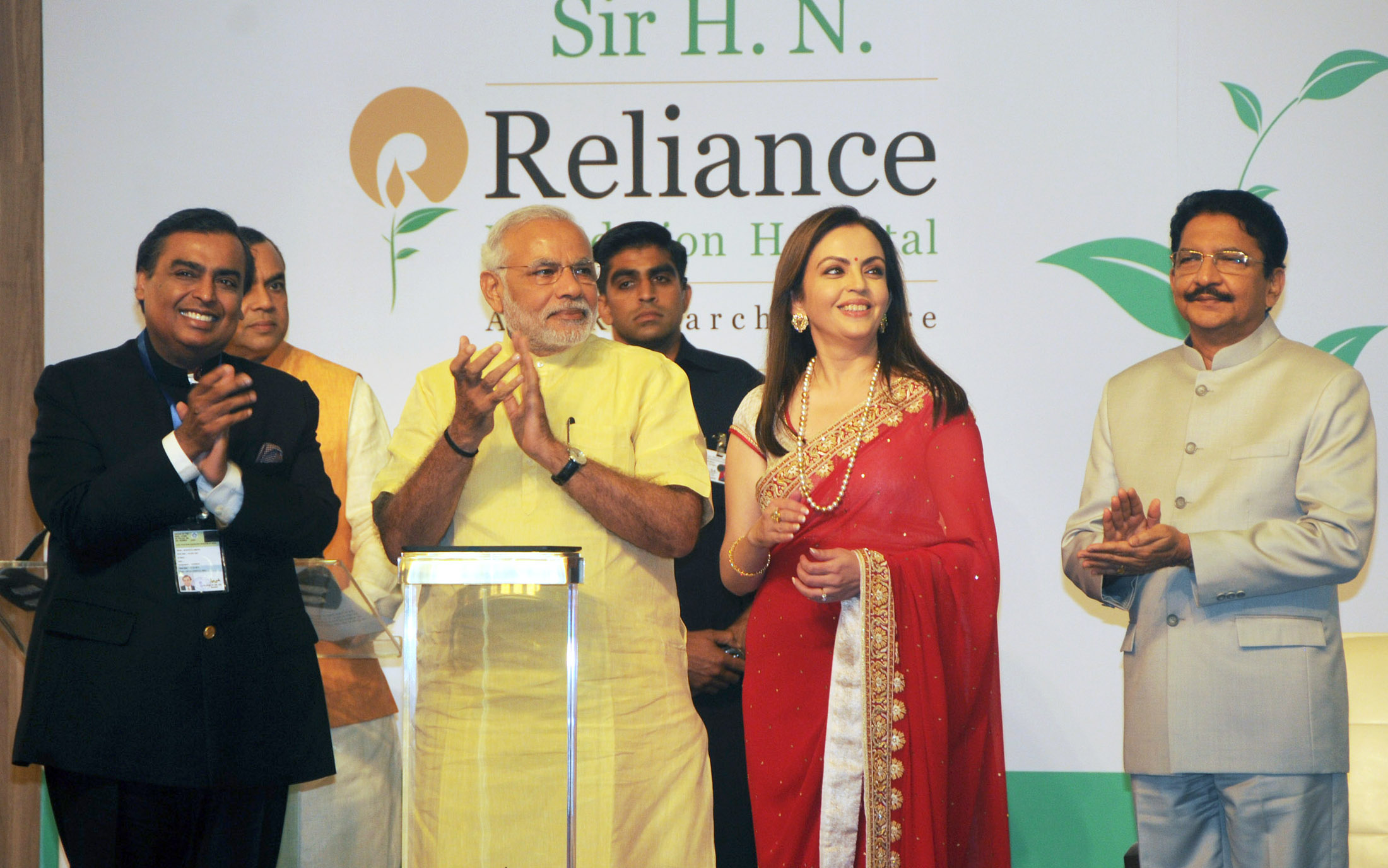
  The Prime Minister, Shri Narendra Modi rededicated Sir H. N. Reliance Foundation Hospital and Research Centre to the nation, in Mumbai on October 25, 2014.
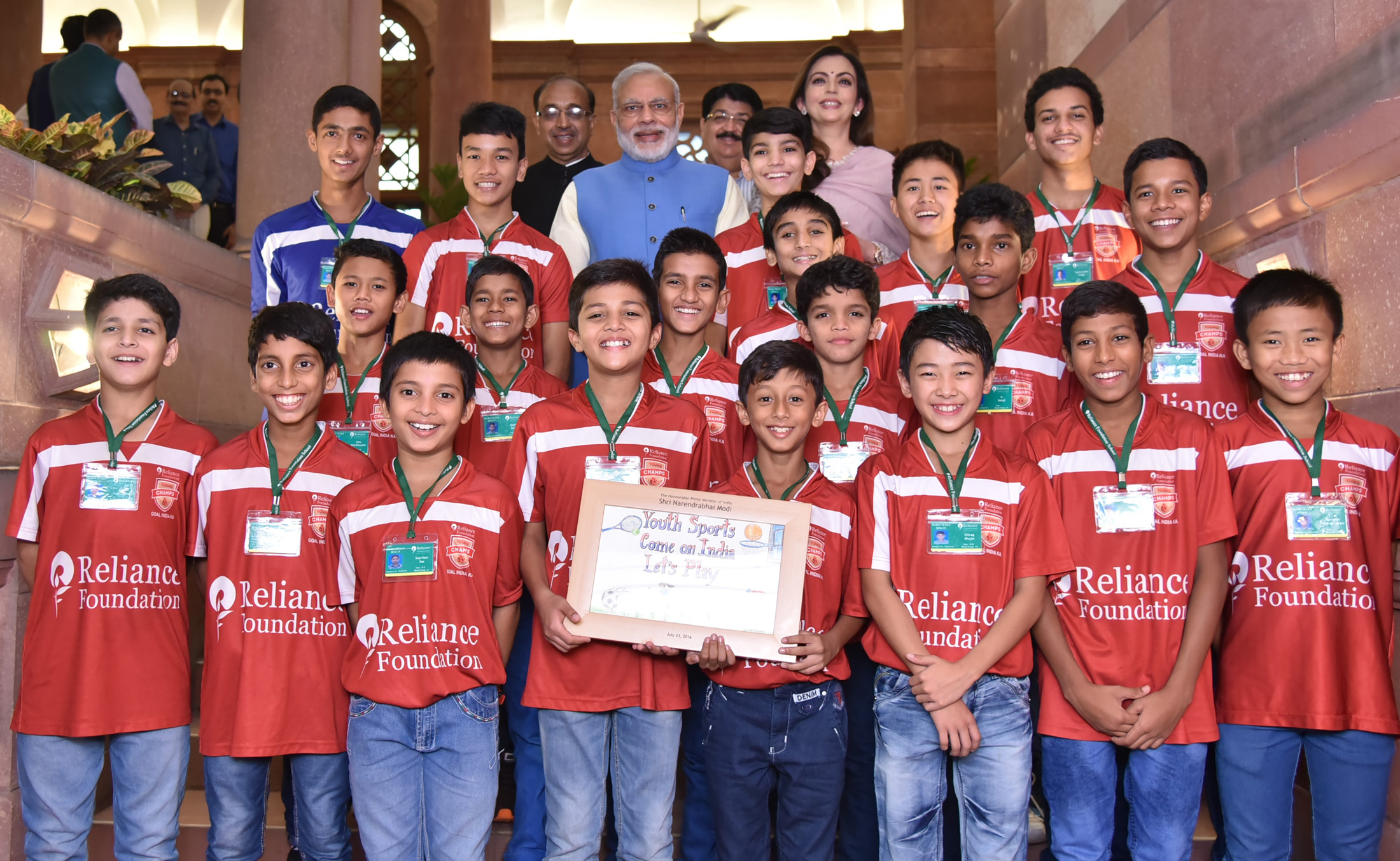
  Prime Minister Narendra Modi launches the Reliance Foundation Youth Sports in Delhi on July 23, 2016.
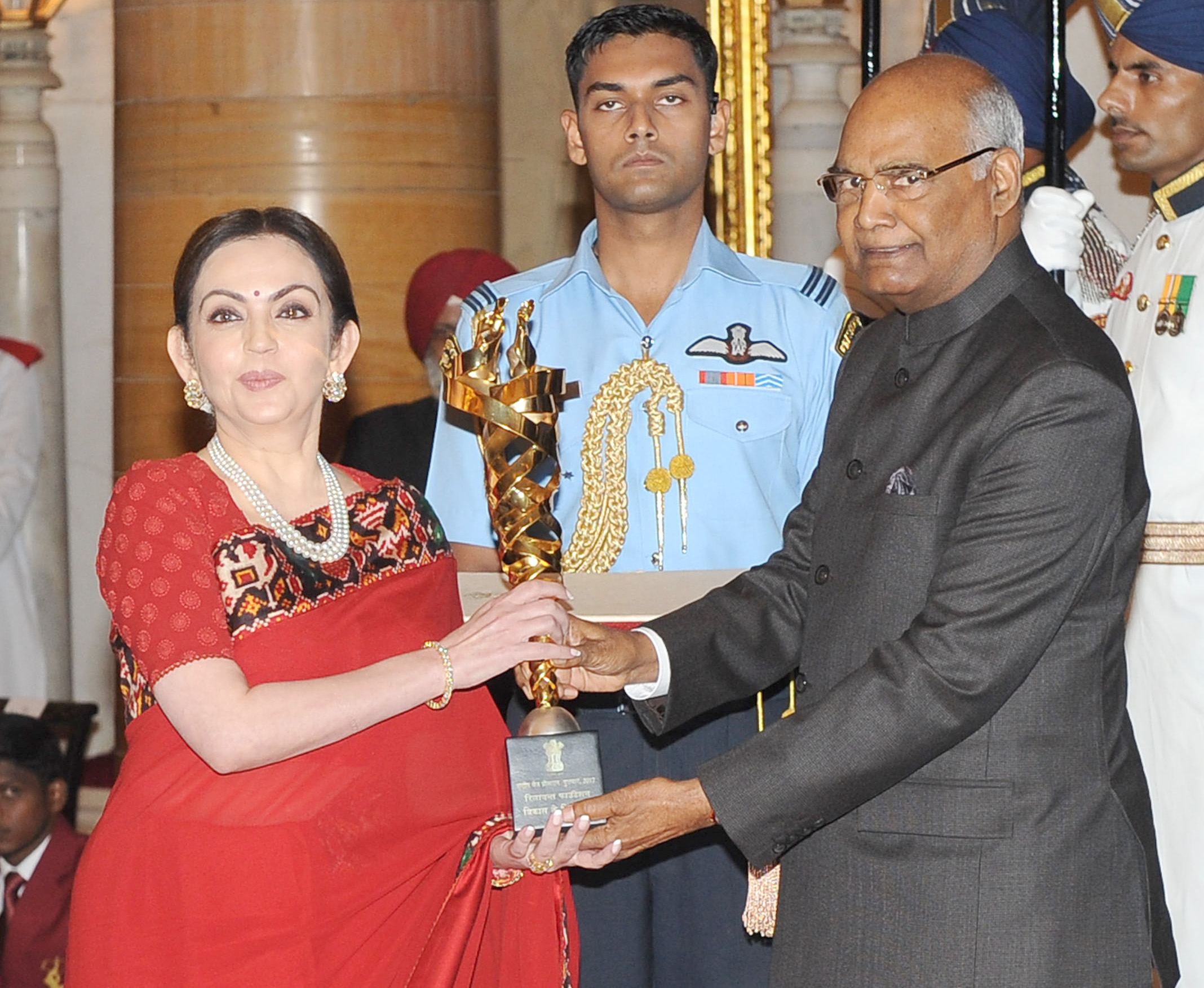
  The President, Shri Ram Nath Kovind presenting the Rashtriya Khel Protsahan Puruskar, 2017 to the Sports for Development – Reliance Foundation at Rashtrapati Bhavan, in New Delhi on August 29, 2017
- Urban renewal: The foundation took over development of Goda Park in Nashik after funding problems had delayed it, and in partnership with NASSCOM is underwriting a social media lab for Mumbai Police to improve involvement of residents in improving safety and security.
- Arts, culture and heritage: The foundation sponsors events celebrating and continuing the cultural heritage of India, such as Ustad Zakir Hussain's annual concert in memory of his father, Abbaji, and the Elephanta Festival on Elephanta Island in Mumbai, and also in 2012 co-sponsored with BP the Mummy: The Inside Story visiting exhibition from the British Museum. In February 2016, Reliance Foundation Drishti organized a nationwide arts and essay competition which also involved visually impaired participants. The winning entries were sent out through printed literature.
- The foundation has proposed to set up Jio Institute near Karjat.

The foundation also works with other philanthropies and NGOs on collaborative initiatives, for example in 2012 partnering with the television show Satyamev Jayate to provide a grant to Muktangan Rehabilitation Centre in Mumbai to help street children.

== Awards ==
- The foundation has been awarded prestigious Rashtriya Khel Protsahan Puruskar for year 2017 by the President of India. Nita Ambani received the 'Rashtriya Khel Protsahan Award 2017' on behalf of Reliance Foundation as its chairperson, for her initiatives on promoting grassroots sports.
- Reliance Foundation's Jr NBA programme entered the Guinness Book of World Record with the participation of over 3400 Jr NBA students in India
- Reliance Foundation received prestigious mBillionth South Asia Award 2017 for its efforts in Agriculture & Environment category. The foundation was conferred the award in recognition of its efforts to leverage mobile technology to enhance lives and livelihoods in rural agricultural communities across India.
- Reliance Foundation bagged the India CSR Community Initiative Award 2017 for supporting the flood-affected communities through technology-driven digital platforms during relief operations in Madhya Pradesh.
- Reliance Foundation bestowed with Institute of Company Secretaries of India CSR Excellence Award
- Reliance Foundation received the Late VD Joshi Award for the Best Ferrocement Structure for the year 2016, for construction of natural water-harvesting structures.
- Reliance Foundation received India CSR Award 2016 for Water Conservation, Agricultural Development and Best Documentary Film.
- Reliance Foundation bagged the prestigious Porter Prize 2015 for its "outstanding contribution to the society to meet the basic human needs, establishing blocks that allow communities to sustain quality of life and creating conditions for individuals to reach their potential".
- Reliance Foundation receives internationally acclaimed "Golden Peacock Award" for its CSR initiatives
