= Godrej =

Godrej may refer to:

- Godrej family, a wealthy business family in India
  - Ardeshir Godrej (1868–1936)
  - Pirojsha Burjorji Godrej (1882–1972)
  - Adi Godrej (born 1942)
  - Nadir Godrej
  - Jamshyd Godrej
  - Tanya Dubash
  - Nisa Godrej
- Godrej Group, a group of companies founded by the Godrej family
  - Godrej & Boyce
  - Godrej Consumer Products Limited
  - Godrej Industries Ltd
  - Godrej Infotech Ltd
  - Godrej Properties Limited
  - Godrej Housing Finance Limited
