= Godrej family =

Indian Parsi family

The Godrej family is an Indian Parsi family that largely owns and manages the Godrej Group, a conglomerate founded by Ardeshir Godrej and his brother Pirojsha Burjorji Godrej in 1897. The family operates in various sectors, including real estate, consumer products, industrial engineering, appliances, furniture, security, and agricultural products. The family is led by Adi Godrej, along with his brother Nadir Godrej and their cousin Jamshyd Godrej. As of 2023, their estimated net worth was reported to be US$16.7 billion.

== History ==
The family's business began in Bombay in 1897, when Ardeshir Godrej, after reading a newspaper article about rising crime rates in the city, began developing and selling locks with the assistance of his brother Pirojsha. Ardeshir Godrej died without direct heirs, and the business was succeeded by Pirojsha Godrej's sons Burjor, Sohrab, and Naval. Today, his grandsons Adi, Nadir, and Jamshyd manage the enterprise.

The initial venture has diversified across sectors and evolved into multiple companies under the umbrella of the Godrej Group, including Godrej Industries, Godrej Agrovet, Godrej Consumer Products, Godrej Properties, Godrej Interio, and the holding company Godrej & Boyce.

== Estate in Mumbai ==
Among the family's most valuable assets is a 3,500-acre estate in Vikhroli, Mumbai, which has been estimated at $12 billion upon development. In 2011, the family announced plans to develop three million square feet by 2017, through an internal joint venture of Godrej Industries and Godrej Properties. For decades, the family has preserved approximately 1,750 acres of mangrove swamps within the estate, leading to the 2012 inclusion of Adi Godrej and Jamshyd Godrej in Forbes magazine's list of the richest green billionaires. On 18 June 2014, the Godrej family bought the bungalow of Homi J. Bhabha, Mehrangir, for Rs. 372 Cr through an auction initiated by the National Center for the Performing Arts in Mumbai.

== Members ==
- Ardeshir Godrej, co-founder of Godrej Brothers
- Pirojsha Burjorji Godrej, co-founder of Godrej Brothers
- Burjor Godrej
- Sohrab Pirojsha Godrej, chairman of the Godrej Group
- Naval Godrej
- Adi Godrej, chairman of the Godrej Group
- Parmeshwar Godrej, socialite and AIDS activist
- Pirojsha Adi Godrej, managing director & CEO of Godrej Properties Limited
- Nadir Godrej, managing director of Godrej Industries and chairman of Godrej Agrovet
- Jamshyd Godrej, chairman of Godrej & Boyce
- Nyrika Holkar, executive director of Godrej & Boyce
- Smita V. Crishna, stockholder of Godrej Group

== Charities ==
The family controls the Pirojsha Godrej Foundation, the Soonabai Pirojsha Godrej Foundation, and the Godrej Memorial Trust.

== Bibliography ==
- B. K. Karanjia (1997). Godrej: The builder also grows. Penguin Books. ISBN 9780670879243.
- B. K. Karanjia (2004). Vijitatma: founder-pioneer Ardeshir Godrej. Viking. ISBN 9780670057627.
- B. K. Karanjia (2000). Final victory: the life and death of Naval Pirojsha Godrej. Viking. ISBN 9780670896448.
- Sohrab Pirojsha Godrej; B. K. Karanjia (2001). Abundant living, restless striving: a memoir. Viking. ISBN 9780670912056.
