= Pirojsha =

Pirojsha may refer to:

== People ==
- Pirojsha Burjorji Godrej (1882–1972), founder of the Godrej Group
- Pirojsha Adi Godrej, great-grandson of Pirojsha Burjorji Godrej
- Sohrab Pirojsha Godrej (1912–2000), Indian businessperson

== Other uses ==
- Pirojsha Godrej Foundation, charitable organisation in India
