= List of Indians by net worth =

The list of richest Indians by net worth based on an annual assessment of wealth and assets compiled and published by Forbes magazine. As of 2025, India has 284 billionaires, which put the country third in the world, after the United States and China. Mukesh Ambani, the chairman and largest shareholder of Reliance Industries, has been the richest Indian for 14 consecutive years. He is currently world's 10th richest person in the world according to Forbes. Savitri Jindal is currently India's richest woman, topping the list at 4th position.

== Top 25 richest Indians ==
The table below lists India's richest people as per their net worth published by the Forbes (April 2024).

Rank	Name	Wealth Change	Net worth (USD)	Company	Sources of wealth
1	Mukesh Ambani	▲	116 billion	Reliance Industries	Diversified
2	Gautam Adani	▲	84 billion	Adani Group	Diversified
3	Shiv Nadar	▲	36.9 billion	HCL Technologies	IT services and consulting
4	Savitri Jindal	▲	33.5 billion	JSW Group Jindal Steel & Power Jindal Stainless Limited	Steel, energy, cement and infrastructure
5	Dilip Shanghvi	▲	26.7 billion	Sun Pharmaceutical Industries	Pharmaceuticals
6	Cyrus Poonawalla	▼	21.3 billion	Serum Institute of India	Vaccines, Finance
7	Kushal Pal Singh	▲	20.9 billion	DLF	Real estate
8	Kumar Mangalam Birla	▲	19.7 billion	Aditya Birla Group	Aluminium, Copper, Paint, Textiles, telecom, cement
9	Radhakishan Damani	▲	17.6 billion	Avenue Supermarts, DMart	Investments, retail
10	Lakshmi Mittal	▼	16.4 billion	ArcelorMittal	Steel
11	Ravi Jaipuria	▲	16.2 billion	RJ Corp	Fast food
12	Uday Kotak	▲	13.3 billion	Kotak Mahindra Bank	Banking
13	Azim Premji	▲	12.0 billion	Wipro Group	IT services and consulting
14	Mangal Lodha	▲	10.4 billion	Lodha Group	Real Estate
15	Pankaj Patel	▲	9.5 billion	Zydus Lifesciences	Pharmaceuticals
16	Sunil Mittal	▲	9.2 billion	Bharti Enterprises	Telecom
17	Rekha Jhunjhunwala	▲	8.5 billion	Rare Enterprises	Investments
18	Hasmukh Chudgar & family	▲	7.7 billion	Intas Pharmaceuticals	Pharmaceuticals
19	M. A. Yusuff Ali	▲	7.6 billion	LuLu Group International	Retail
20	Gopikishan Damani & family	▲	7.0 billion	Avenue Supermarts, DMart	Investments, retail
21	Benu Gopal Bangur	▼	6.8 billion	Shree Cement	Cement
22	Vikram Lal	▲	6.7 billion	Eicher Motors	Automotive
23	Murali Divi & family	▼	6.2 billion	Divi's Laboratories	Pharmaceuticals
24	Rajan Mittal	▲	6.0 billion	Bharti Enterprises	Telecom
24	Rakesh Mittal	▲	6.0 billion	Bharti Enterprises	Telecom

Source: Forbes

== Top 5 richest Indian women ==
Rank	Name	Net worth (USD)	Company	Sources of Wealth
1	Savitri Jindal	33.5 billion	JSW Group, Jindal Steel & Power	Steel, energy, cement and infrastructure
2	Rekha Jhunjhunwala	8.5 billion	Rare Enterprises	Investments
3	Vinod Rai Gupta	5.0 billion	Havells	Manufacturing
4	Renuka Jagtiani	4.8 billion	Landmark Group	Fashion & Retail
5	Smita Crishna-Godrej	3.8 billion	Godrej Group	Consumer goods, real estate

Source: Forbes India

== See also ==
- Forbes list of billionaires
- List of countries by the number of billionaires
- List of wealthiest families
