= Smita V. Crishna =

Richest woman in India

- Born: Smita Crishna-Godrej; India
- Known for: One of the richest women in India
- Spouse: Vijay Crishna
- Children: 2
- Father: Naval Godrej
- Relatives: Pirojsha Burjorji Godrej (grandfather)

Smita V. Crishna is an Indian businesswoman and one of the richest women in India. Crishna has a net worth of $5.1 billion, as of June 2026. She and other members of the Godrej family control the Godrej Group, a consumer-goods major.

In October 2024, Smita Crishna-Godrej and her brother Jamshyd Godrej were ranked 22nd on Forbes list of India's 100 richest tycoons, with a net worth of $11.1 billion.
