= Skymet Weather Services =

Weather company from India

- Type: Private
- Founded: 2003
- Founder: Jatin Singh
- Headquarters: Noida, India
- Area served: Worldwide
- Services: Weather monitoring & forecasting UAV & Remote sensing Crop surveillance
- Website: www.skymetweather.com

Skymet Weather Services is a private Indian company that provides weather forecasting services.

Skymet was the first private sector entity to provide weather forecasts and weather graphics to the Indian media in 2003. Skymet was founded by Jatin Singh in 2003 and is headquartered in Noida, India. Today Skymet provides weather service and graphics to most of Indian media companies in India, such as Zee News, Aaj Tak, Sahara Samay, Mint, Times Now, ABP and The Hindu. Its other clients include Reliance Infrastructure Ltd,Thomson Reuters and North Delhi Power Ltd. Skymet also provides weather service information to most of the major insurance companies in India, power sector and agriculture sector. Skymet provides wind and solar forecast for different renewable energy companies by running its own meso and micro scale NWP. Skymet along with few NGOs are closely working to improve the sustenance of farmer in different remote blocks of many states in India. Skymet also caters to different companies for marine weather forecast.

Skymet also recently launched a weather website that allows a common user to get accurate weather information for free. It also launched an android app and App Store (iOS) that gives weather information. Despite availability of many such weather app in Google Play store, Skymet app was seen as the first made in India app that provides weather information in multiple regional languages. When cyclone Phailin hit the Eastern coastal regions of India, Skymet became a referring point for forecast along with international websites like Accuweather. Skymet has developed many software tools for weather and climate decision support systems.

== Funding ==
Weather forecasting services provider Skymet Weather Services raised $4.5 million in Series B funding from multiple investors led by Asia Pacific, the investment arm of UK-based media firm Daily Mail and General Trust plc (DMGT) and Godrej group-backed existing investor Omnivore Partners.

Skymet has received one round of funding so far from Omnivore Partners through a Rs.250 Cr ($50 Mn) fund, that was launched with Godrej Agrovet, the diversified agribusiness arm of the Godrej group being the anchor investor. Omnivore reportedly picked up a 33 percent stake in Skymet and Mark Kahn, partner of Omnivore Partners joined the board of Skymet Services.

== Success ==
Skymet has reportedly predicted Indian monsoons during 2012, 2013 and 2014 before the India Meteorological Department and released their report in a press conference.

== Failure ==
Indian Meteorological Department correctly predicted a second below-normal monsoon year in a row whereas Skymet's claims of a normal monsoon for 2015 failed to deliver. Also same thing happened in 2019.

== Criticism ==
Skymet was criticized by Director General of IMD, Dr L.S. Rathore for taking on IMD over forecasting monsoons in India in 2013. In an interview given to Business Standard India Dr. Rathore said "Skymet needs to be mature in their prediction.
