= Driptech =

Irrigation equipment company in California

Driptech Inc.
- Industry: Agriculture; Irrigation; Pipe
- Founded: California (2008)
- Headquarters: Pune, India
- Number of employees: 40
- Website: www.driptech.com

Driptech Inc. is a company engaged in making of irrigation-equipment, a type of drip irrigation method. The company won awards for its innovative, low cost drip irrigation system, eliminating expensive and complex emitters used by traditional drip irrigation systems. The company is based out of Mountain View, California. In 2016 Jain Irrigation system Ltd owned Driptech India.

== History ==
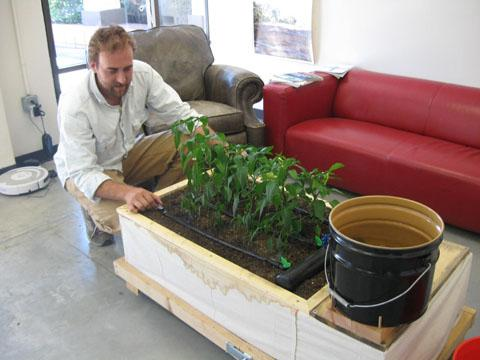
Company founder Peter Frykman has a working model of his Driptech system in his California office.

In the spring of 2008, three Stanford University graduate students from the schools of business, engineering, and design joined forces in a course called Entrepreneurial Design for Extreme Affordability. The team traveled to Ethiopia to see where they could apply their talents to help, arriving in the middle of the worst drought Ethiopia had experienced in 20 years. The farmers they met had no means to grow crops with the scarce water resources available. The drip irrigation products that were locally available were too expensive for most farmers and seldom worked properly. These farmers needed better, less costly, more effective ways to use their meager water supplies efficiently.

The team returned to the Stanford Hasso Plattner Institute of Design ("d.school") and invented a new manufacturing technology that makes clean, consistent holes in super-low-cost plastic tubing. The resulting product works better and more reliably than the competition at 2-5x less cost. With this success, mechanical engineer Peter Frykman put his plan to get an engineering Ph.D. on hold and incorporated Driptech to manufacture and sell drip irrigation tubing for developing markets across the globe.

As of 2020, the company was a subsidiary of Jain Irrigation Systems.

== Operations ==
The company has operations in India and China. In India, it supplies equipment for small farmers in Karnataka, Jharkhand and Tamil Nadu through the distribution network of Godrej Agrovet.
