= Sohrab Pirojsha Godrej =

Indian businessperson (1912–2000)

Sohrab Godrej
- Born: 3 June 1912; Bombay, Bombay Presidency, British India
- Died: 22 May 2000 (aged 87); London, United Kingdom
- Other name: Soli
- Occupations: Businessperson; Entrepreneur
- Known for: Godrej Group
- Parent(s): Pirojsha Burjorji Godrej; Soonabai
- Awards: Padma Bhushan

Sohrab Pirojsha Godrej (3 June 1912 – 22 May 2000), popularly known as Soli, was an Indian businessperson, entrepreneur and the chairman of Godrej Group, one of the largest conglomerates in India with interests in real estate, consumer products, industrial engineering, appliances, furniture, security and agricultural products. He is a former Sheriff of Mumbai.

== Early life ==
Born on 3 June 1912 to Pirojsha Burjorji Godrej, the co-founder of Godrej Group, in Mumbai, in the western Indian state of Maharashtra, he did his schooling at Queen Mary School and St. Xavier's High School and graduated in science from St. Xavier's College, Mumbai. After the death of his father in 1972, he became the chairman of the group.

== Career ==
Along with being the chairman of Godrej Group of Industries, Mr. Godrej had a wide range of interests, which included scientific management, environment, population control and development, education, social welfare, international affairs, archaeology and heritage conservation.

He was the past-president of the International Chamber of Commerce - India; the Council of EU Chambers of Commerce in India; Indo-French Chamber of Commerce and Industry and the Indo-Belgian Chamber of Commerce and Industry. He served as the Sheriff of Mumbai in 1983 and was also the president of the Indo-French Technical Association.

=== Beyond Godrej ===
Sohrab Godrej was closely connected with various organisations committed to the preservation of nature, wildlife and environment as President Emeritus of the World Wide Fund for Nature - India. He was also the vice-president of the Bombay Natural History Society, president of the National Society of the Friends of the Trees, patron of the Family Planning Association of India and governing board member of the Population Foundation of India among others.

== Awards ==
The Government of India awarded him the third highest civilian honour of the Padma Bhushan, in 1999, for his contributions to Indian business.

He was presented with the White Pelican award by Prince Philip, the Duke of Edinburgh.

He was also awarded the Indira Gandhi Pariyavaran Puraskar in 1991.

== Personal life ==
His life has been documented in his memoirs, Abundant living, restless striving, co-written by his long-time friend, B. K. Karanjia.

== See also ==
- Godrej family
- Pirojsha Burjorji Godrej
- Godrej Group
