= Naval Godrej =

Indian industrialist (1916–1990)

Naval Pirojsha Godrej
- Born: Naval Pirojsha Godrej; 3 December 1916
- Died: 8 August 1990 (aged 73)
- Spouse: Soonuben Godrej
- Children: Jamshyd Godrej and Smita Crishna-Godrej
- Parent: Pirojsha Godrej
- Relatives: Ardeshir Godrej

Naval Pirojsha Godrej (3 December 1916 – 8 August 1990), also known as Naoroji, was born on 3 December 1916. The father of Jamshyd Godrej, the managing director and chairman of Godrej & Boyce, Naval was the youngest son of Pirojsha Burjorji Godrej - an Indian industrialist who was the younger brother of Ardeshir Godrej, the founder of the Godrej Group.

== Early life ==
Naval was three years old when his mother died.

When their mother died, the children were sent to Karachi to be looked after by their grandmother. Naval studied at St. Patrick’s School in Karachi, followed by St. Mary’s High School - once they moved back to Mumbai (then Bombay). Naval had an extremely curious mind and few things thrilled him more than taking apart a watch and putting it together again. Pirojsha noticed this mechanical aptitude and asked Naval to come and see the factory during his holidays, after his matriculation.

Naval joined the business straight out of high school.

== Career ==
Naval's interest in machines led him to develop the Godrej Tool Room, and to initiate the typewriter and refrigeration lines of business. He guided the Machine Tool Association through its formative years and was its President from 1971-73. He also established the pioneering international exhibition, IMTEX where the Machine Tool industry showcases products.

He was involved with the construction of the Godrej Industrial garden township in Vikhroli.

== Personal life ==
Naval had two children, Jamshyd and Smita Crishna-Godrej. He died on 8 August 1990 at his residence in Bombay (now Mumbai), aged 73.

== Awards ==
He received the Padma Bhushan award in 1976, in the field of Trade & Industry.

== Professional Achievements ==
=== The Tool Room and Machine Tools ===
Much importance has been given to the country’s industrialisation even before freedom was won (1947), but credit must be given to Naval for taking the initiative in manufacturing machine tools nearly a decade earlier. The opportunity came during the war years when the machines required by Godrej could no longer be imported. Naval rose to the challenge and in the 1940s, he created a path-breaking line of machines including the first 35 tonne power press. He also pioneered the indigenous manufacture of machine tools & metal forming and machine cutting machines.

=== The First All-Indian Typewriter ===
Before Naval’s efforts, typewriters had never been made anywhere in Asia. Typewriter manufacturing required highly specialised machinery and deft workmanship. Even though Naval conceived the idea of typewriter manufacture as early as 1946, production started only in the early 1950s due to raw material restrictions and wartime considerations. The first all-Indian typewriter was introduced in 1955. However, mastering the manufacture of typewriters was no easy task. It took several models before Naval was satisfied with the soft touch of the keys – a feature that made the typist’s job easier. In so much, the success of Godrej typewriters led to foreign competition downing their shutters in Indi(c)

=== The Refrigerator Manufacture ===
Having been the first to make typewriters, Naval was keen to help Indian households access other modern conveniences. After overcoming many teething problems, Godrej was successful in producing the first 230 Volt Model 9 refrigerator, having a capacity of 7.3 cubic feet, in 1958. For more than a decade, several different models were introduced. In 1962, Godrej, which had been using the imported GEC compressor unit, began manufacturing hermetically sealed compressors in India.
