= Council On Energy, Environment and Water =

Indian nonprofit organization

Council on Energy, Environment and Water (CEEW)
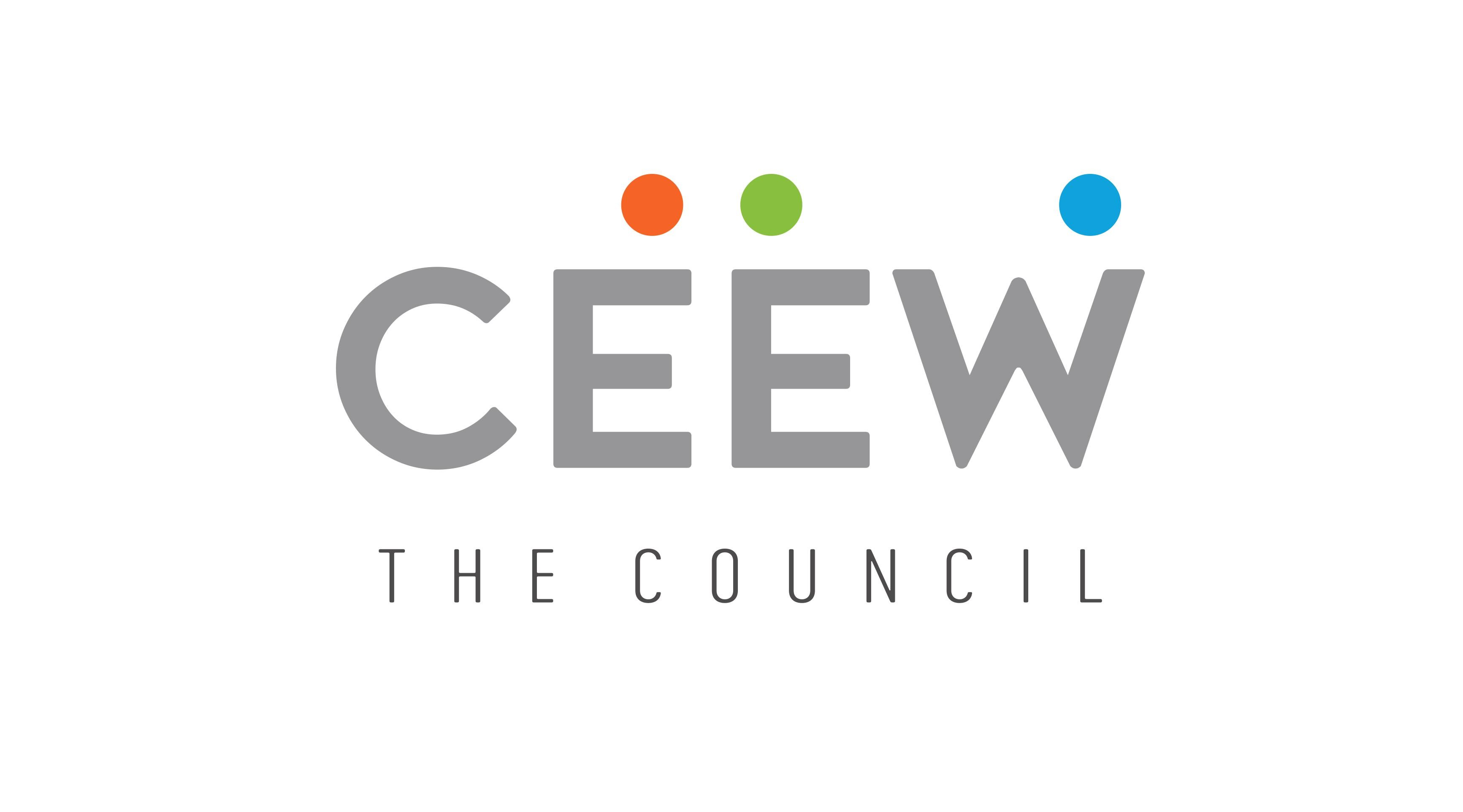
- Abbreviation: CEEW
- Formation: 2010
- Type: Public Policy Think Tank
- Location: New Delhi, India
- Chairperson: Jamshyd Godrej
- CEO: Arunabha Ghosh
- Staff: 200+
- Website: https://www.ceew.in

The Council on Energy, Environment and Water, commonly known as CEEW, is a not-for-profit policy institution and think tank based in New Delhi, India. CEEW was formed to provide independent research-based insights to policymakers for building a sustainable India. The Council also has an office in Lucknow, Uttar Pradesh. It has multiple research projects running across 22 Indian states and other parts of the world.

CEEW's research areas include energy and resource efficiency and security; power sector reforms, industrial decarbonisation, sustainable mobility and cooling, sustainable food systems, climate risks and adaptation, air quality, water resources management, sustainability finance, energy-trade-climate linkages and climate geoengineering governance. The think tank advises the Indian government. The CEO of CEEW is Arunabha Ghosh.

== History ==
CEEW was founded in 2010 with a mission to identify integrated solutions required to achieve balanced growth and development for India. Given the global nature of climate change and resource challenges, and the need for cross-border, collective action, Arunabha Ghosh, CEEW's founder and CEO, envisioned an internationally focused institute to "solve real problems using world-class research.

CEEW's first Chairperson was Suresh Prabhu, a former Union Minister in the Government of India. In 2022, CEEW has over 200 employees, including engineers, economists, social and environmental scientists and management graduates. CEEW's research has been widely covered by Indian and international news outlets. The think tank also convenes the world's best minds for sustainability-related conferences, including its flagship event — Energy Horizons.

- In July 2022, Jharkhand Chief Minister Hemant Soren unveiled a new solar policy with a view to helping the State generate 4,000 megawatt (MW) clean energy in the next five years. CEEW supported Jharkhand Renewable Energy Development Agency (JREDA) as a knowledge partner to develop the Jharkhand State Solar Policy 2022.
- In May 2022, Union Minister Bhupender Yadav, delivered the keynote address at the National Dialogue on Sustainable Cooling and launched two reports 'Technology Gaps in India's Air-Conditioning Supply Chain' and 'Making Sustainable Cooling in India Affordable'.
- In October 2021, CEEW released a report 'Impications of a Net-Zero Target for India's Sectoral Energy Transitions and Climate Policy', which put forward 2070 as India's most likely net-zero target year, in the run up to COP 26.
- In September 2021, Union Minister RK Singh delivered the keynote address at the CEEW- Ministry of New and Renewable Energy session 'A Multilateral Approach to Building a Global Hydrogen Economy' and launched the study "Greening Steel: Moving to Clean Steelmaking Using Hydrogen and Renewable Energy."
- In April 2021, CEEW's Centre for Energy Finance (CEEW-CEF) along with the Central Electricity Authority (CEA) launched the India Renewables Dashboard.
- In August 2020, Union Minister Piyush Goyal, Rajiv Kumar (NITI Aayog), and Damilola Ogunbiyi (SEforAll) launched "Powering Livelihoods" — a CEEW and Villgro initiative for rural start-ups.
- In June 2020, Union Minister Nitin Gadkari published a report by CEEW and the National Institute of Public Finance and Policy (NIPFP) titled "Jobs, Growth and Sustainability: A New Social Contract for India's Recovery' to outline a roadmap for rebooting the economy after the coronavirus induced lockdown."
- In July 2019, Union Minister Dharmendra Pradhan and Executive Director of the International Energy Agency, Fatih Birol, launched the CEEW Centre for Energy Finance at CEEW's flagship event Energy Horizons.
- In 2018, CEEW along with the National University of Singapore and the Initiative for Sustainable Energy Policy (ISEP) released India's largest primary data set on energy access covering more than 9,000 households from 756 villages in 54 districts collecting about 2.5 million data points.
- In 2018, the then Chief Minister of Andhra Pradesh, N. Chandrababu Naidu, and the then UN Environment's Executive Director Erik Solheim, published CEEW's study on Zero Budget Natural Farming at the World Economic Forum in Davos.
- In June 2017, CEEW launched the Women in Sustainability initiative on World Environment Day.
- In September 2015, Union Minister Mr. Piyush Goyal released CEEW's study "Access to Clean Cooking Energy and Electricity Survey of States."
- In August 2014, Union Minister Prakash Javadekar published CEEW and WWF-India's joint report "RE+ Renewables beyond Electricity: Solar Air Conditioning and Desalination in India."

== Board members ==
Members of CEEW's board of trustees include

- Jamshyd N. Godrej (Chairperson) – Chairman of the Board of Godrej & Boyce Manufacturing Company Pvt. Ltd.
- Anil Kakodkar – Former Chairman, Atomic Energy Commission; former Secretary, Department of Atomic Energy, Government of India.
- S. Ramadorai – Chairman, Tata Technologies Ltd; Director, Piramal Enterprises Ltd.
- Montek Singh Ahluwalia – Former Deputy Chairman, Planning Commission, Government of India.
- Naushad Forbes - Co-Chairman of Forbes Marshall.

== Funding ==
CEEW is an independent research institution, which receives its funding through donations and grants. Its funding sources include private and philanthropic foundations, multilateral organisations, government grants, corporations, and public institutions. CEEW's research caters to an audience comprising policymakers, journalists, academics, industry stakeholders, and students, who are separate from the funders. The think tank does not compromise on its editorial independence.

== Research and publications ==
CEEW has engaged in over 300 research projects. Some of its notable publications include:

- Jobs, Growth and Sustainability: A New Social Contract for India's Recovery.
- Implications of a Net-Zero Target for India's Sectoral Energy Transitions and Climate Policy.
- Sustainable Agriculture in India 2021: What We Know and How to Scale Up.
- Preparing India for Extreme Climate Events: Mapping Hotspots and Response Mechanisms.
- How Robust are Urban India's Clean Air Plans? An Assessment of 102 Cities.
- India Residential Energy Survey (IRES).
- A Green Hydrogen Economy for India: Policy and Technology Imperatives to Lower Production Cost.

== Awards and recognition ==
- CEEW has been consistently ranked among the world's top climate change think tanks.
- CEEW was ranked 1st in South India and 15th Globally among 'Top Think Tanks with Annual Operating Budgets of Less Than $ 5 Million USD'. It also featured among the top 100 out of 11,175 think tanks in eight categories & across 10 categories of the University of Pennsylvania's 2020 Global Go To Think Tank Index Report.
- International Center for Climate Governance (ICCG) ranked CEEW 15th globally in 2012 and 27th globally in 2013, 2nd in India and 20th globally in 2015 as part of its 'Climate Think Tank' standardised ranking.
- The Prospect magazine ranked CEEW 2nd in the 'International Energy' category for its pioneering study on solar-powered healthcare.
- A representative of CEEW participated in the UN Environment's Committee of Permanent Representatives on the governance of climate geoengineering workshop, at Nairobi, in May 2018.
