= Vijay Crishna =

Indian actor (1944–2026)

Vijay Mohan Crishna (c. 1944 – 3 March 2026) was an Indian actor.

== Early life ==
Crishna was from Shimla. He was married to Smita Crishna-Godrej, and together they had two daughters, Nyrika Holkar and Freyan Crishna Bieri. Trekking was his hobby and he climbed 20,000 feet peak in Ladakh and went on trekking trips to Antarctica and South America. He served Godrej Enterprises Group for 45 years till 2021.

== Career ==
Crishna started his acting career on a Delhi stage in sixties. By 1971, he moved to Mumbai theatre scene. One of his first plays was Pearl Padamsee's play Orphans and then he starred in Alyque Padamsee's tantric-inflected Macbeth in the titular role, and directed Shaw's Saint Joan. However, it was Dattani's Dance Like a Man, where in the role of a Bharatanatyam dancer, Jairaj, he performed the play for 25 years on stage. Then his cinema life began with Richard Attenborough's Gandhi in 1982. He is remembered most for his role in Sanjay Leela Bhansali's Devdas (2002), where he played the role of Shah Rukh Khan's father. He also starred in the 2004 film Dance Like a Man, a theatre adaptation. He has acted in other films such as Gandhi (1982), Chain Kulii Ki Main Kulii (2007), Guzaarish (2010), and PK (2014).

== Death ==
Crishna died on 3 March 2026, at the age of 81.
