= Pheroza J. Godrej =

Indian art historian (born 1948)

Pheroza Jamshyd Godrej (née Shroff; born 1948, in Mumbai) is an Indian art historian, artist, and curator, best known for founding the Cymroza Art Gallery in Mumbai, in 1971. A graduate of the University of Mumbai, she sits on the advisory boards of the National Gallery of Modern Art, Mumbai and the Indira Gandhi National Centre for the Arts. A scholar of Zoroastrian studies, she is a member of the Godrej family, as the wife of industrialist Jamshyd Godrej.

== Selected works ==
- Godrej, Pheroza; Rohatgi, Pauline (1989). Scenic splendours: India through the printed image (1 ed.). London: British Library. ISBN 9780712301596.
- Godrej, Pheroza (1995). Under the Indian sun: British landscape artists. Bombay: Marg Publ. ISBN 978-8185026299.
- Rohatagi, Pauline; Godrej, Pheroza (1989). India, a Pageant of Prints. Marg Publications. ISBN 978-81-85026-08-4.
- Rohatgi, Pauline; Godrej, Pheroza; Mehrotra, Rahul (1997). Bombay to Mumbai: Changing Perspectives. Marg Publications. ISBN 978-81-85026-37-4.
- Godrej, Pheroza; Mistree, Firoza Punthakey (2002). A Zoroastrian Tapestry: Art, Religion & Culture. Mapin Pub. ISBN 978-1-890206-22-2.
