= Pirojsha Godrej Foundation =

Charitable organisation

- Founded: 1972; 54 years ago
- Type: Non-profit Organization
- Purpose: Education; Health; environment; Disaster Response
- Location: Mumbai, Maharashtra, India
- Region served: India
- Key people: Godrej Family

Pirojsha Godrej Foundation is a charitable organisation based in Mumbai, India. It works in the fields of education, health, environment and disaster relief.

== About ==
Pirojsha Godrej Foundation was established in 1972. The objectives of the foundation include medical relief, educational aid, protection of the environment and relief funds in case of natural disasters. The trust owns approximately 23% of the issued equity shares of Godrej & Boyce Mfg. Co. Ltd., the holding Company of the Godrej Group. The income from dividends received with respect to these shares is utilised for promoting the objectives of the foundation.

== Objectives ==
The foundation has sponsored several thousands of students via education grants, individually as well as through institutions. It also supports culture and fine arts through the Godrej Dance Academy at NCPA. The Foundation has been extending medical grants. In association with the Naoroji Godrej Center For Plant Research, the foundation has been working to preserve biodiversity and mangroves in Mumbai.

== External grants ==
Some of the key beneficiaries of the Pirojsha Godrej include CII Foundation- Kerala floods, Chief Ministers Relief Fund, Prime Minister's National Relief Fund, Bombay Environmental Action Group, PRF Legislative Research and the Naoroji Godrej Centre for Plant Research and Foundation for Medical Research.

The WWF India headquarters was built with the help of a significant grant from the Pirojsha Godrej Foundation. The foundation has also funded the Pirojsha Godrej Wing of the Breach Candy Hospital and the Red Cross Disaster Center both in Mumbai.
