= Godrej BKC =

Godrej BKC (Bandra-Kurla Complex)
- Interactive map of the Godrej BKC (Bandra-Kurla Complex) area

General information
- Type: Commercial Spaces
- Location: Bandra Kurla Road, Mumbai, India
- Coordinates: 19°03′35″N 72°51′54″E
- Estimated completion: 2015
- Owner: Godrej Group

Technical details
- Floor count: Ground + 19
- Floor area: 1,300,000 sq.ft.

Design and construction
- Architect: SOM
- Developer: Godrej Group
- Structural engineer: Larsen & Toubro

Godrej BKC (Bandra-Kurla Complex) is a project by Godrej Properties Limited developed in partnership with Jet Airways located in Mumbai, India. The architectural partner is SOM (Skidmore, Owings and Merrill) and the construction was undertaken by L&T.

== Ownership history ==
Godrej Properties divested its ownership stake in the Godrej BKC commercial development. The transaction was among the significant real estate deals in Mumbai's financial district at the time. A commercial real estate transaction for office space in Mumbai's Bandra-Kurla Complex involved approximately 435,000 square feet, with a reported value of ₹1,479 crore. Financial media described the transaction as a significant commercial property deal in the city.

=== Development & launch ===
Godrej Properties secured development rights for a land parcel in Mumbai's Bandra-Kurla Complex (BKC) from Jet Airways. The agreement covered the construction of a commercial real estate project on the site. Godrej Properties launched the Godrej BKC commercial project in Mumbai's Bandra-Kurla Complex. The development was designed to include office spaces with contemporary amenities and sustainable features.

== Tenancy ==
Godrej Fund Management was reportedly negotiating the sale of three floors in a Bandra Kurla Complex commercial property. The potential transaction was estimated at approximately ₹900 crore (around $108 million), reflecting market values for premium office space in Mumbai's financial district. Godrej Fund Management completed the sale of a commercial office space in Mumbai's Bandra Kurla Complex. The transaction was part of the firm's strategic asset management plan and demonstrated ongoing investment activity in the city's premium commercial real estate market.

=== Notable tenancy ===
In 2023, streaming service Netflix renewed its office lease for approximately 150,000 square feet in the Godrej BKC tower for a five-year term. In 2016, e-commerce company Amazon leased approximately 30,000 square feet of office space in the building for its corporate headquarters.

== Significant deals ==
In 2019, pharmaceutical firm Abbott Laboratories acquired commercial office space in the Bandra-Kurla Complex from Godrej Properties for a reported ₹1,479 crore. The transaction covered approximately 435,000 square feet of space.

== Asset acquisition history ==
The land parcel for the project was acquired through an insolvency auction process of Jet Airways. Bank of Baroda was declared the highest bidder for the Bandra-Kurla Complex office asset.

== See also ==
- List of tallest structures in the Indian subcontinent
- List of tallest buildings in Mumbai
- Godrej Properties Limited
