= Godrej Properties =

Indian real estate developer

Godrej Properties Limited
- Type: Public
- Traded as: BSE: 533150; NSE: GODREJPROP
- Industry: Real estate
- Founded: 1 January 1990
- Founder: Adi Godrej
- Headquarters: Mumbai, India
- Number of locations: 12
- Area served: India
- Key people: Adi Godrej (Chairman, Godrej Group), Gaurav Pandey (Managing Director & CEO)
- Products: Residential buildings, Commercial complex, Township;
- Revenue: ▲₹3,036 crore (US$320 million) (2024)
- Operating income: ▲₹973 crore (US$100 million) (2024)
- Net income: ▲₹719 crore (US$75 million) (2024)
- Total assets: ▲₹35,734 crore (US$3.7 billion) (2024)
- Total equity: ▲₹9,992 crore (US$1.0 billion) (2024)
- Number of employees: 2000+ (as of 2019)
- Parent: Godrej Industries Group
- Website: www.godrejproperties.com

Godrej Properties Limited is an Indian real estate company headquartered in Mumbai. A subsidiary of Godrej Industries Group, it operates in the residential, commercial, and township development sectors across major Indian cities. The company is listed on the Bombay Stock Exchange (BSE) and the National Stock Exchange (NSE).

== History ==
Godrej Properties was established in 1990 as the real estate development arm of the Godrej Group, a diversified Indian conglomerate founded in 1897.

In 2010, the company went public following an initial public offering that raised approximately US$100 million. Since 2012, the company has been led by Executive Chairman Pirojsha Adi Godrej, a fourth-generation member of the Godrej family, who joined the Godrej Group in 2004.

Over the years, the company has developed residential, commercial, and township projects across multiple cities in India, including the Mumbai Metropolitan Region and Pune.

In 2025, the company acquired approximately 75 acres of land in Nagpur for the development of a plotted township project. In 2026, it acquired an 8.5-acre land parcel in Mahalunge, Pune, through an outright purchase.

== Operations ==
The company operates in 12 cities across India, including the Mumbai Metropolitan Region (MMR), Delhi-NCR, Pune, Bengaluru, and Hyderabad.

In 2025, GPL reported sales bookings of ₹34,171 crore. In February 2026, the company announced a joint development agreement for an 18-acre land parcel in Thane, within the Mumbai Metropolitan Region (MMR).

== Capital raising ==
In June 2018, GPL raised ₹1,000 crore through a private placement, followed by ₹2,100 crore through a Qualified institutional placement (QIP) in 2019 and ₹3,750 crore through another QIP to institutional in March 2021.

In December 2024, the company raised ₹6,000 crore through a further QIP.

== Projects ==
- Godrej BKC, Mumbai
- Planet Godrej, Mahalaxmi, Mumbai
- Godrej Garden City, Ahmedabad
- Godrej City, Panvel, Maharashtra
- The Trees, Mumbai

== Recognition ==
The company was included in the Fortune India 500 rankings in 2012, 2014, 2015, 2016, and consecutively from 2020 to 2024.

In 2025, the company was ranked among the developers in the GROHE-Hurun India Real Estate 150 report by total area developed.
