= Nadir Godrej =

Indian entrepreneur

Chevalier Nadir Godrej LH
- Born: 1951 (age 74–75)
- Education: IIT Bombay; MIT; Stanford University; Harvard Business School
- Occupations: Chairman of Godrej Agrovet; Managing director of Godrej Industries
- Spouse: Rati Godrej
- Children: Burjis Godrej
- Relatives: Adi Godrej (brother)

Nadir Burjorji Godrej (born 1951) is an Indian chemical engineer, industrialist and member of the Godrej family. He is managing director of Godrej Industries, one of India's biggest businesses, and as chairman of Godrej Agrovet.

In October 2024, Adi and Nadir Godrej were ranked 21st on Forbes list of India’s 100 richest tycoons, with a net worth of $11.2 billion.

== Background and personal life ==
Godrej was born the younger son of Burjorji Godrej by his wife Jaiben Godrej. Burjorji was the nephew of Ardeshir Godrej, founder of the Godrej group of industries. Since Ardeshir was childless, the vast industrial estate created by Ardeshir was inherited by three nephews. The family belongs to the Parsi community and follows the Zoroastrian religion. The Godrej family has been settled in Mumbai for over two centuries. After studying in IIT Bombay for 1 year Nadir Godrej transferred to MIT and earned his Bachelor of Science in Chemical Engineering and a Master of Science in Engineering from Stanford University. Then he earned his Masters in Business Administration from Harvard Business School.

Nadir Godrej has one older brother, Adi Godrej, who is the chairman of the Godrej Group. He is a first cousin of Jamshyd Godrej, chairman and managing director of Godrej & Boyce, another major family firm.

Nadir Godrej is married to Dr. Rati Godrej. The couple have three sons, Burjis (b. 1992), Sohrab (b. 1994) and Hormusji (b. 1996). They live in Mumbai.

== Career ==
Godrej currently serves as managing director of Godrej Industries, one of India's biggest businesses, and as chairman of Godrej Agrovet. These are two of the major companies run by his family.

Apart from holding positions of responsibility in his own family's companies, Godrej also sits as an independent director on the boards of several non-group companies. As of 2016, these include Mahindra & Mahindra, Tata Teleservices, and Taj Hotels.

He is also on the board of advisors of India's International Movement to Unite Nations (I.I.M.U.N.).

In 2013 he made an undisclosed angel investment in an Indian social networking service, LocalCircles.

== Awards ==
- Exemplary industrialist award.

== Interests ==
Godrej speaks six languages, including Russian and French. He is known for his fondness of poetry and mathematics. He is also a published poet. Godrej is also a part of the advisory board of IIMUN.
