= Queen Mary School, Mumbai =

Coordinates: 18.9594°N 72.8150°E

Queen Mary School
- Mumbai, Maharashtra; India

Information
- Type: Private
- Established: 1875; 151 years ago
- Founder: Zenana Bible and Medical Mission
- Principal: Miss G. Mathias
- Grades: Nursery–10
- Houses: Edith Cavell, Grace Darling, Joan of Arc and Florence Nightingale
- Website: Official Website

The Queen Mary School, is a private school for girls in Grant road, Mumbai, India. It was founded in 1875, It operates under the management of Christian Medical Educational Fellowship (C.M.E.F) Trust and is affiliated to Indian Certificate of Secondary Education (I.C.S.E) Board. Notable alumni include Maniben Patel (the daughter of Sardar Patel).

== History ==
The Queen Mary School in Mumbai, India, was started in 1875 by the Zenana Bible and Medical Mission, an Anglican Mission, to provide education for girls. Initially, most of the teachers were of British origin who came to India under the auspices of the Mission to teach. These were gradually replaced by local Indian teachers, primarily Parsis, followed by other Indian ethnicities.

== Present ==
Queen Mary School is affiliated to the Council for the Indian School Certificate Examinations for the class 10 Board exams and the Indian Certificate of Secondary Education.

== Headmistresses ==
=== British Principals ===
- Miss Harley
- Miss Kimmins
- Miss Kelsall
- Miss Wilson
- Miss Nixon
- Miss Heather
- Miss Bevis
- Miss A. K. Groom
- Miss A. E. Lambert
- Miss B. R. Shelton

== Notable alumni ==
- Maniben Patel, Indian freedom fighter, Politician, Sardar Patel's daughter and LokSabha MP}
- Padmashri Shabana Azmi, actress, National award winner and Rajya Sabha MP
- Shobhaa De, columnist, author, and publisher
- Chandi Bathwala, Indian Representative at the U.N.
- Nargis Dutt, the woman-in-white of the Indian cinema and former Chairperson of the Spastics Society of India
- Dr. Armaity Desai, former Director of the Tata Institute of Social Services and former Chairperson of the University Grant Commission
- Preeti Sagar, playback singer.
- Rajni Iyer, Senior Counsel, Bombay High Court
- Sharda Dwivendi, historian
- Shaina NC, fashion designer
- Soli P Godrej, Former Sheriff of Bombay
- Sooni Taraporevala, international award winner for script writing Salaam Bombay and Mississippi Masala.
- Aarti Chhabria, Actress
- Ayra Cama, famous poet and writer
- Devita Saraf, Founder of Vu Technologies and Co Founder of Vu TelePresence
- Gautami Kapoor, Actress and model
- Saryu Doshi, Padma Shri awardee
- Sohrab Pirojsha Godrej, Former chairman of Godrej Group and Padma Bhushan awardee
