= Planet Godrej =

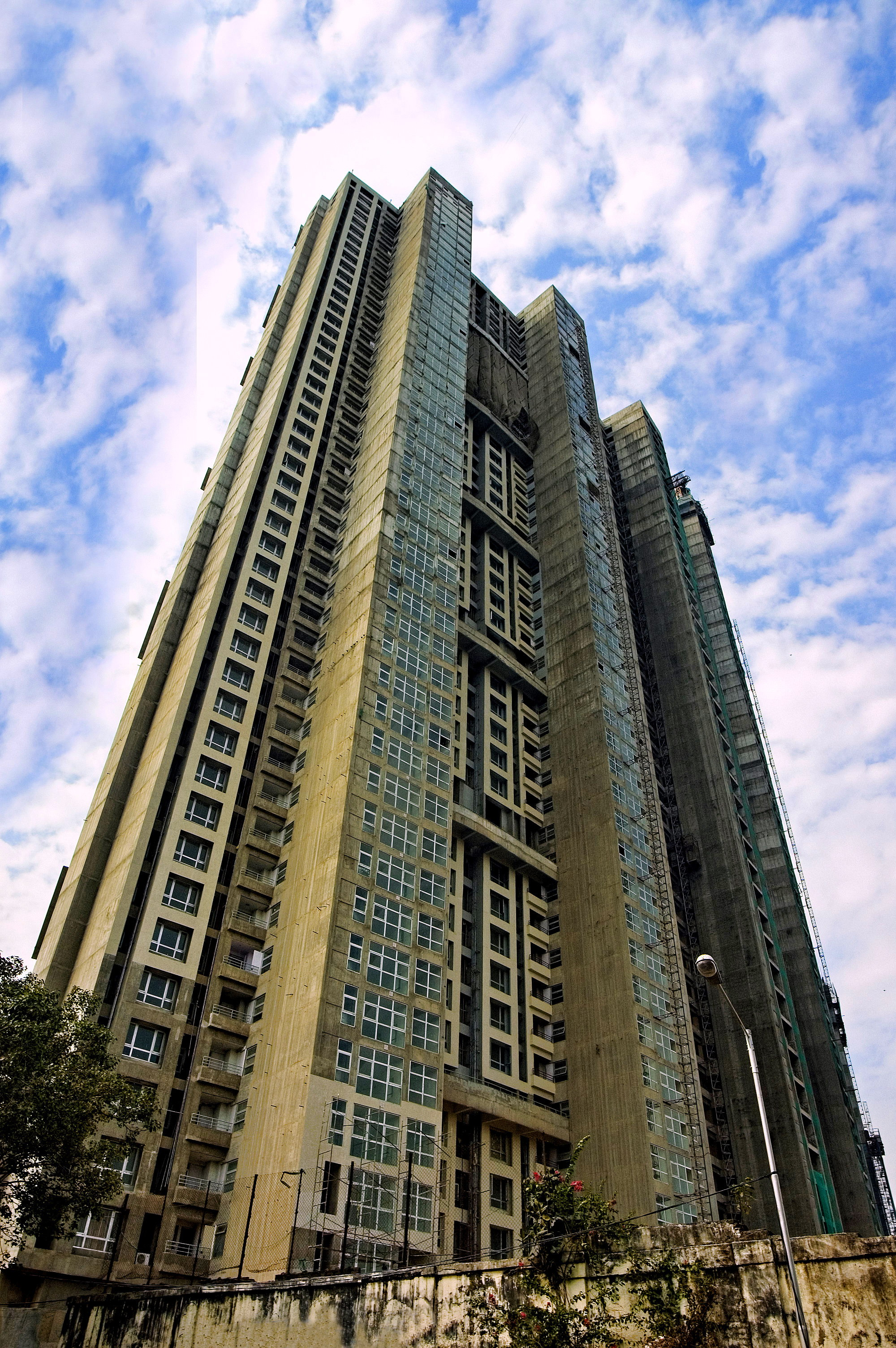
- Interactive map of the Planet Godrej area

Record height
- Tallest in India from 2008 to 2009^{[I]}
- Preceded by: World Trade Center Mumbai
- Surpassed by: The Imperial

General information
- Status: Completed
- Type: Residential Skyscraper
- Location: Simplex Mills, 30 Keshavrao Khadye Marg, Sant Ghadge Maharaj Chowk, Mahalaxmi, Mumbai, India
- Coordinates: 18°58′51″N 72°49′48″E
- Construction started: 2006
- Completed: 2009
- Owner: Godrej Properties

Height
- Roof: 181.2 m (594 ft)

Technical details
- Material: Concrete
- Floor count: 51
- Floor area: 670,000 sq ft (62,245 m^{2})
- Lifts/elevators: 15

Design and construction
- Architect: DP Architects
- Main contractor: Godrej Properties

Planet Godrej is a residential skyscraper located on a plot of 9-acre (3.6 ha) at Mahalaxmi, Mumbai, Maharashtra, India. The tower stands 181 m (594 ft) tall and is 51 floors high. It has about 300 residential apartments. Only 5% of the total land was used to build the skyscraper, resulting in extensive open space. It was designed by the Singapore-based DP Architects and given the PINNACLE Award 2006, by Zee Business.

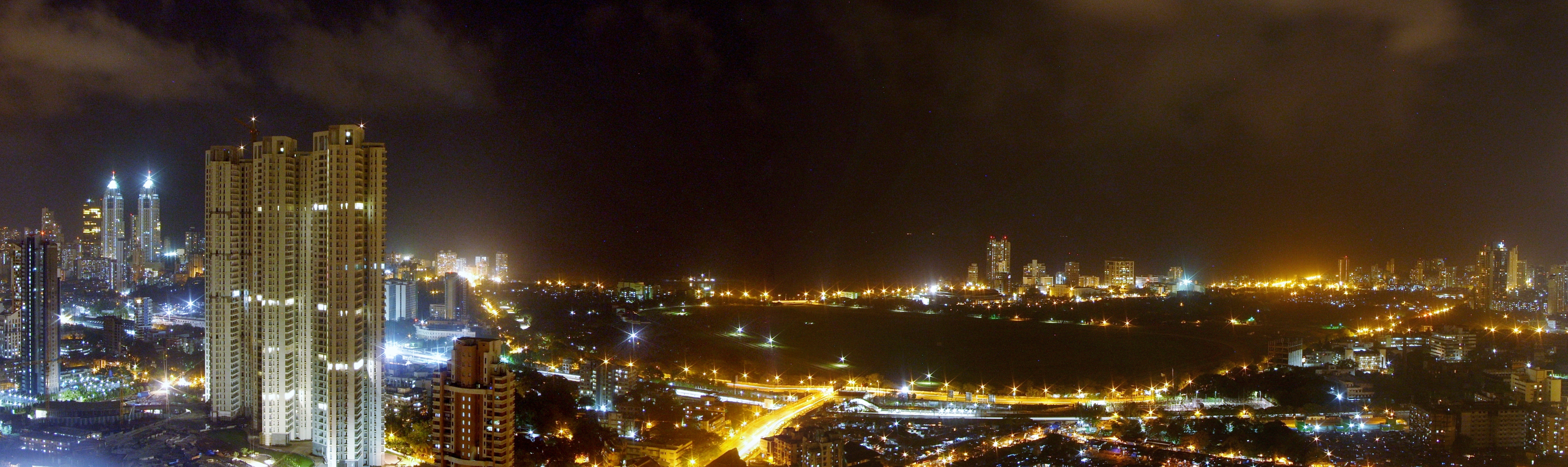
Panoramic view of Mumbai from Planet Godrej

== See also ==
- List of tallest buildings in India
- List of tallest buildings in Mumbai
- List of tallest buildings and structures in the Indian subcontinent
- List of tallest buildings in Asia
- List of tallest structures in India
- List of tallest structures in the world
- List of tallest buildings in different cities in India
- List of tallest residential buildings
