= Chain Kulii Ki Main Kulii =

2007 film by Karanjeet Saluja

- Directed by: Karanjeet Saluja
- Screenplay by: Nupur Asthana
- Story by: Jay Shewakramani; Satyam Tripathi
- Based on: Like Mike
- Produced by: Sweta Agnihotri; Ken Ghosh; Shashikant Khamkar; Namrata Rungta
- Starring: Rahul Bose; Zain Khan; Susheel Parashar; Rajesh Khera; Meera Vasudevan; Nasir Khan; Raj Bhansali
- Cinematography: Promod Kumar Pradhan
- Edited by: Shaju Chandran
- Music by: Songs: Salim–Sulaiman; Score: Sandeep Shirodkar
- Production companies: Shadow Films; Saregama Films
- Distributed by: Saregama
- Release date: 22 June 2007
- Running time: 92 minutes
- Country: India
- Language: Hindi

Chain Kulii Ki Main Kulii (also marketed as CK²MK) is a 2007 Indian Hindi-language fantasy sports comedy film directed by Karanjeet Saluja (also known as Kittu Saluja). It stars Zain Khan and Rahul Bose. The film features music by Salim–Sulaiman and lyrics by Irfan Siddiqui. Cricketer Kapil Dev also makes a cameo appearance in the film. This film is very closely inspired by the 2002 American movie Like Mike.

== Plot ==
Karan is a thirteen-year-old boy who lives in an orphanage in super bad condition, owned by a stern warden, John "Hitler" Kakkad. Karan has two dreams: one is to have parents, and the other is to be a big cricketer. His inspiration is Kapil Dev, since he has been brought up being motivated by his skills. His dreams take a turn when one day, he lays his hands on an old cricket bat, which Karan is convinced is the bat that Dev used to win the 1983 World Cup; for him, the bat becomes a magic bat. One day, by a stroke of luck, the coach of the Indian cricket team spots Karan playing cricket and is highly impressed by his batting skills. At that point, the Indian cricket team had been going through a rough patch.

Karan and his magical bat are inducted into the Indian cricket team as the opening batsman along with the captain, Varun. When Karan marches onto the pitch and wins the match for India, he soon becomes the nation's heartthrob. Although he was formerly rejected by adopting couples, he is now the most sought-after kid in the country. However, Raghav, the orphanage bully, hates him and feels that if Karan did not have the magic bat, he would have never made it to the cricket team. Raghav now wants the magic bat at any cost. Karan and Varun develop a strong emotional bond deeper than fellow cricketers. Karan has no parents, and Varun has parents but is estranged from his father and does not want to accept him. Karan strongly believes that parents are the best gift endowed by God and succeeds in uniting Varun with his father.

At the final 5th one day match between India and Pakistan, events spiral out of control, and Karan's magic bat is destroyed by Raghav. Karan is a nervous wreck, but Varun makes him realise that the bat was in fact just an ordinary bat, and it was a mere coincidence that two players, viz. Karan and Dev, who used that bat, were both incredibly talented batsmen. Karan could get the magic back forever if he places faith in himself instead of the bat. With Karan's help, India wins the match. After the match, Karan decides to rejoin the team only when he is older and with more practice. Varun and his fiancé, Malini, decide to adopt Karan.

== Cast ==
- Rahul Bose as Varun Roy
- Zain Khan as Karan
- Meera Vasudevan as Malini
- Rajesh Khera as John Kakkad
- Susheel Parashar as Bholu Dada
- Raj Bhansali as Raghav
- Deiptimaan Chowdhury as Daboo
- Vijay Crishna as the Indian cricket team coach
- Amrinder Sodhi as Sonty
- Viineet Kumar as Sohail
- Nassar Abdullah as Varun's father
- Smita Hai as Varun's mother
- Manini De as Nadira
- Nasir Kazi as Maru
- Bobby Bedi as Rafique
- Chandan K Anand as Wasim
- Kapil Dev as himself (cameo appearance)
- Kunal Ganjawala as himself in the song "Chain Kulii Ki Main Kulii"

== Music ==
Chain Kulii Ki Main Kulii

Soundtrack album by Salim-Sulaiman, DJ Ashrafi, Shankar–Jaikishan and S. D. Burman
- Released: 8 May 2007
- Recorded: 2006–2007
- Genre: Feature film soundtrack
- Length: 24:05
- Label: Saregama

Official audio
- Chain Kulii Ki Main Kulii – Full Album on YouTube

Chain Kulii Ki Main Kulii (Original Motion Picture Soundtrack)
No.	Title	Lyrics	Music	Singer(s)	Length
1.	"Hum The Woh Thi - Remix - Chalti Ka Naam Gaadi"	Majrooh Sultanpuri	S. D. Burman, DJ Ashrafi	Kishore Kumar	4:00
2.	"Chain Kulii Ki Main Kulii"	Irfan Siddique	Salim-Sulaiman	Kunal Ganjawala	3:49
3.	"Khulla Asmaan"	Irfan Siddique	Salim-Sulaiman	KK, Salim Merchant	4:23
4.	"Sunday"	Irfan Siddique	Salim-Sulaiman	Armaan Malik, Sharavan Iyer, Kaustav, Chorus	4:07
5.	"Ichak Dana - Remix - Shree 420"	Hasrat Jaipuri	Shankar–Jaikishan, DJ Ashrafi	Lata Mangeshkar, Mukesh	3:36
6.	"Dhoom Dhadaka"	Irfan Siddique	Salim-Sulaiman	Kailash Kher, Vijay Prakash, Hrushitesh Kamerker, Mangal Mishra, John Stewart, Salim Merchant	4:10

== Reception ==
=== Box office ===
Chain Kulii Ki Main Kulii failed to get a good response at the box office. The film released after schools had re-opened, which resulted in collections in single digits, earning ₹890,000 in its opening week. In India, it grossed ₹6.4 million.

=== Critical response ===
Khalid Mohamed of Hindustan Times gave the film 2 out of 5 stars, describing it as "tedious and requiring total suspension of disbelief". Rajeev Masand gave the film 2.5 out of 5 stars, calling it "an honorable attempt and a film you wouldn’t be embarrassed to take your children to". Taran Adarsh of Bollywood Hungama gave the film 1.5 out of 5 stars, writing "On the whole, Chain Kulii Ki Main Kulii is an ordinary fare that might attract kids in its opening weekend. But the three tough oppositions next week will marginalize it completely." Rediff.com's Patcy N., however, complimented it as a watchable and "cute film". She gave the film 2.5 out of 5 stars, writing ″Though the orphanage angle is copied from Annie (1982) and Great Expectations, the cricket angle adds newness to the film. All in all, not a bad movie.″
