= Navroze Godrej =

Indian businessman

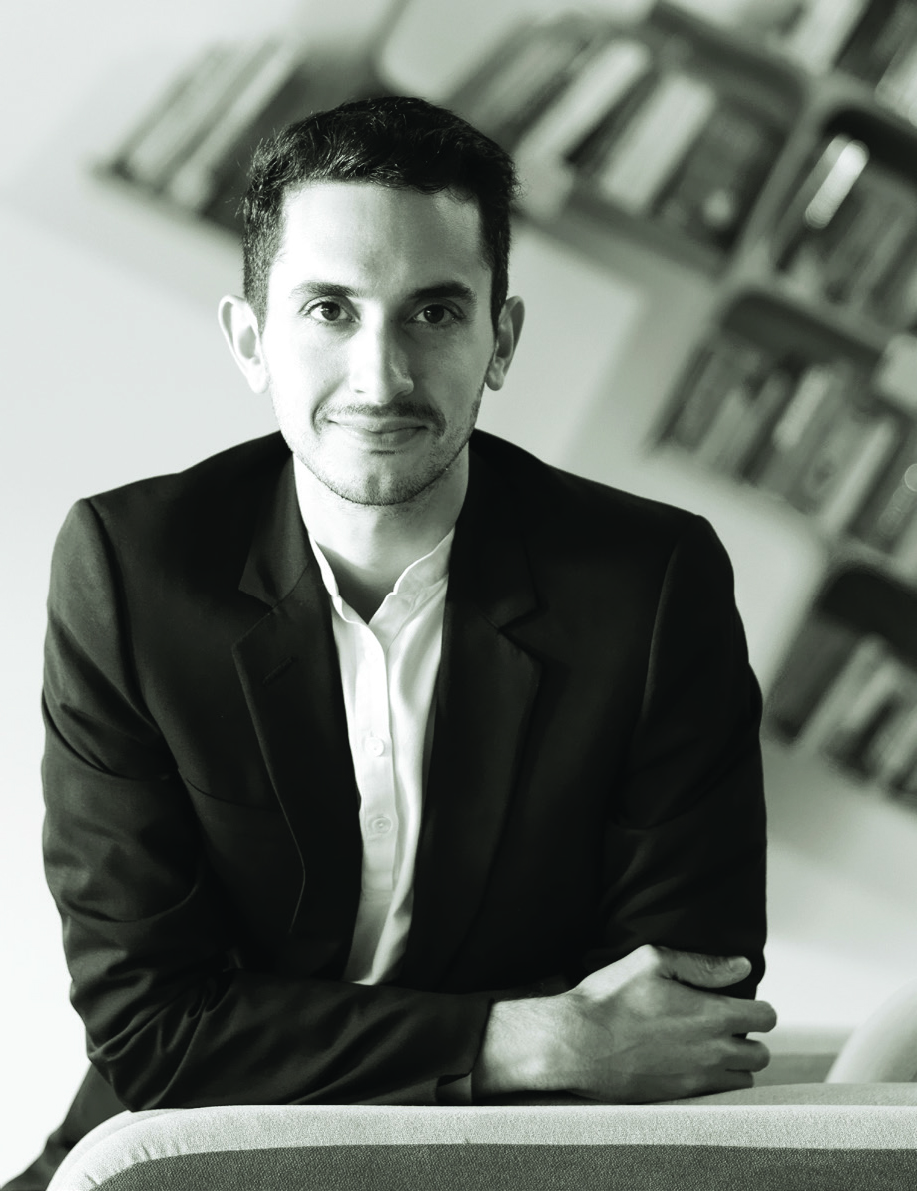
- Education: IIT; Institute of Design, Chicago
- Occupations: Executive Director of Godrej & Boyce

Navroze Godrej, son of Indian industrialist Jamshyd Godrej, is the Executive Director of Godrej & Boyce and leads Strategy and Innovation for the group.

He is the only member of the fourth generation of the Godrejs so far to be inducted on the company's board.

== Early life ==
He has a Master of Design degree from the IIT Institute of Design, Chicago. He has been involved in the development of new businesses like Chotukool and U&Us Design Studio.

== Career ==
He joined the Godrej group in 2005. Currently he is the Non-Executive Director of Godrej & Boyce. As a leader of Strategy and Innovation for the group, Navroze created Hubble, which is a space to innovate and to re-imagine the corporate environment and workspace relationships.

== Beyond Godrej ==
He is the Co-chairman of the Confederation of Indian Industry (CII) National Committee on Design and is also a Board Member of the Global Innovation and Technology Alliance (GITA).
