= Pirojsha Adi Godrej =

Indian industrialist and businessman

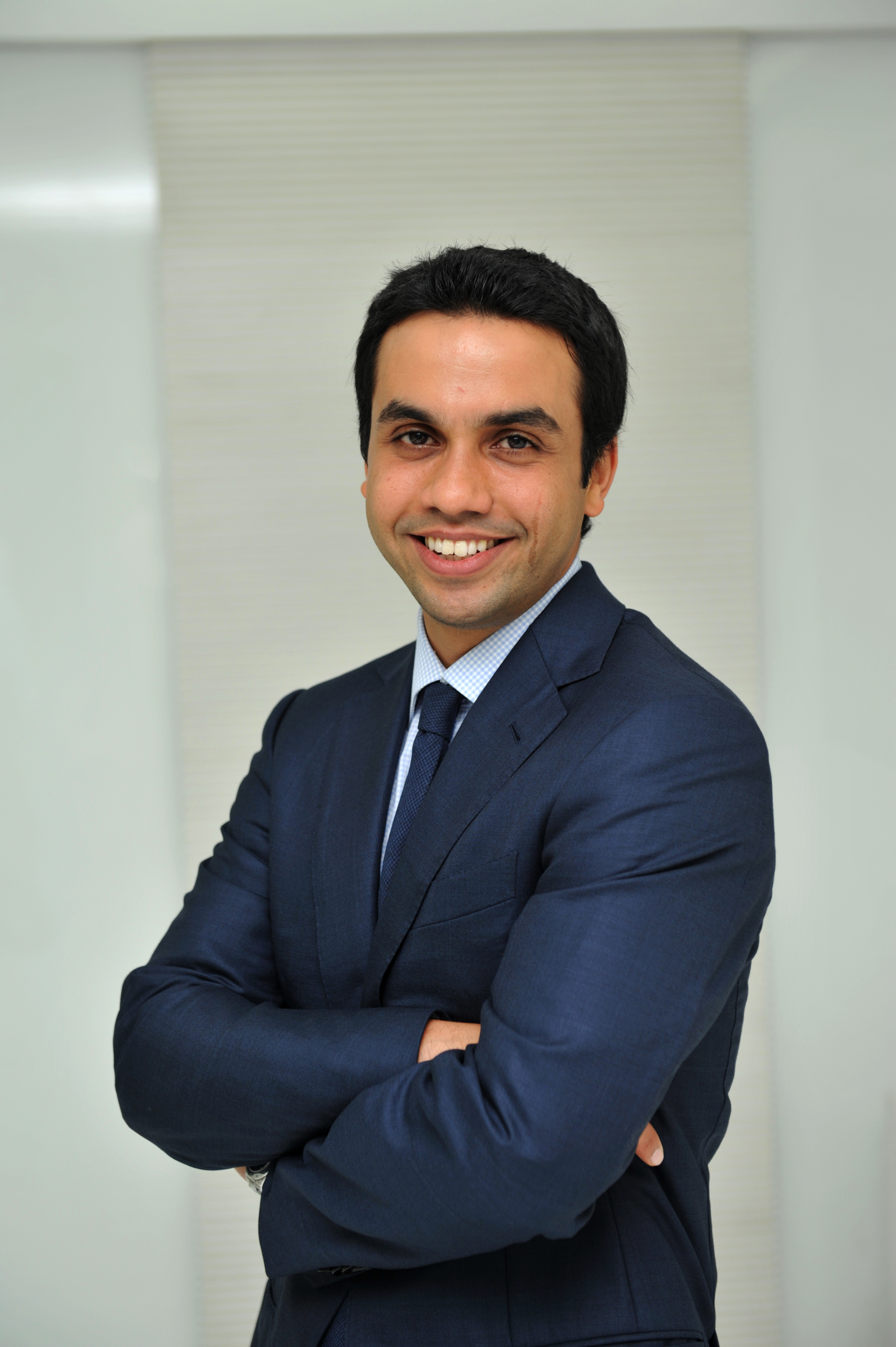
- Education: Cathedral & John Connon School; Columbia University; Wharton School of Business
- Occupation: Executive chairman of Godrej Properties Limited
- Children: 2
- Parent(s): Adi Burjorji Godrej; Parmeshwar Godrej
- Relatives: Tanya Arvind Dubash (sister); Nisaba Adi Godrej (sister)

Pirojsha Adi Godrej is an Indian businessman who is the executive vice-chairperson of the Godrej Industries Group and the executive chairman of Godrej Properties. He is scheduled to succeed Nadir Godrej as chairperson of the Godrej Industries Group in August 2026.

== Early life and education ==
Pirojsha graduated from the Wharton School of Business in 2002 and completed a master's degree in international affairs from Columbia University in 2004. He later completed an MBA from Columbia Business School in 2008.

Before this, he was additional private secretary to the minister of state for external affairs in New Delhi and worked as an intern in the New York Senate office of Hillary Clinton.

== Career ==
Godrej joined Godrej Properties in 2004. He later left to pursue further education, returning to the company in 2008 as executive director.

In 2010, he led the company's initial public offering, raising US$100 million. Following his appointment as CEO in 2012, Godrej Properties moved away from conventional land banking toward a capital-lite model of joint developments and development management agreements. The company focused on acquiring projects for immediate development rather than accumulating land for later use. He became executive chairman of the company in 2017.

Godrej Properties partnered with the Clinton Foundation's Clinton Climate Initiative for its Godrej Garden City township project in Ahmedabad, which was selected as one of seventeen projects worldwide working toward climate-positive development. In 2013, Godrej Properties received a GreenCo rating from the Confederation of Indian Industry, with the award presented by former president A. P. J. Abdul Kalam.

In April 2026, the Godrej Industries Group announced a succession plan under which Pirojsha Godrej would succeed Nadir Godrej as chairperson of Godrej Industries in August 2026. He also chairs Godrej Properties, Godrej Capital, and Godrej Ventures.

In 2015, The Economic Times selected him in their 40 Under 40 list of business leaders. He was also listed by GQ magazine as one of the 50 most influential young Indians.
