= Pirojsha Burjorji Godrej =

Indian businessman

- Born: 1882; Bombay, Bombay Presidency, British Raj (present day Maharashtra, India)
- Died: 1972 (aged 89–90)
- Occupation: Businessman
- Spouse: Sunabai Godrej

Pirojsha Burjorji Godrej (1882–1972) was an Indian businessman, son of Burjorji Godrej and brother of Ardeshir Burjorji Godrej. Pirojsha with his brother Ardeshir laid the foundation for the international conglomerate Godrej Group.

== Early life ==
Pirojsha was the son of Burjorji Godrej and a member of the Parsi community. He was born into a wealthy Parsi-Zoroastrian family of Bombay (now Mumbai), called Gootherajee. Burjorji later changed the family name to Godrej in January 1871.

Working with his elder brother Ardeshir Godrej, Pirojsha made Godrej a household name in India.

== Career ==
Pirojsha joined the business in the year 1906 at the age of 24, soon after graduating from the Victoria Jubilee Technical Institute, Mumbai. Pirojsha Burjorji Godrej, alongside his brother Ardeshir Burjorji Godrej, cofounded Godrej Brothers, the forerunner of the international conglomerate Godrej Group.

The industrial township of Pirojshanagar in the suburbs of Mumbai is named after him. The logo of the Godrej group is taken from his signature. On 1 May 1928, the sole ownership and control of the company was transferred to Pirojsha, by Ardeshir.

=== Current successors ===
Today, his grandsons Adi, Nadir, and Jamshyd run the Godrej group.

== Personal life ==
Pirojsha had three sons, Sohrab, Burjor, who married Jai Dastur, and Naval, who married Soonoo Dastur. He also had a daughter named Dosa, who married Kaikhushroo Naoroji. Pirojsha's young wife Soonabai died in Mussoorie due to the influenza epidemic.
