= DMart =

Indian private retail chain of hypermarkets

Avenue Supermarts Limited

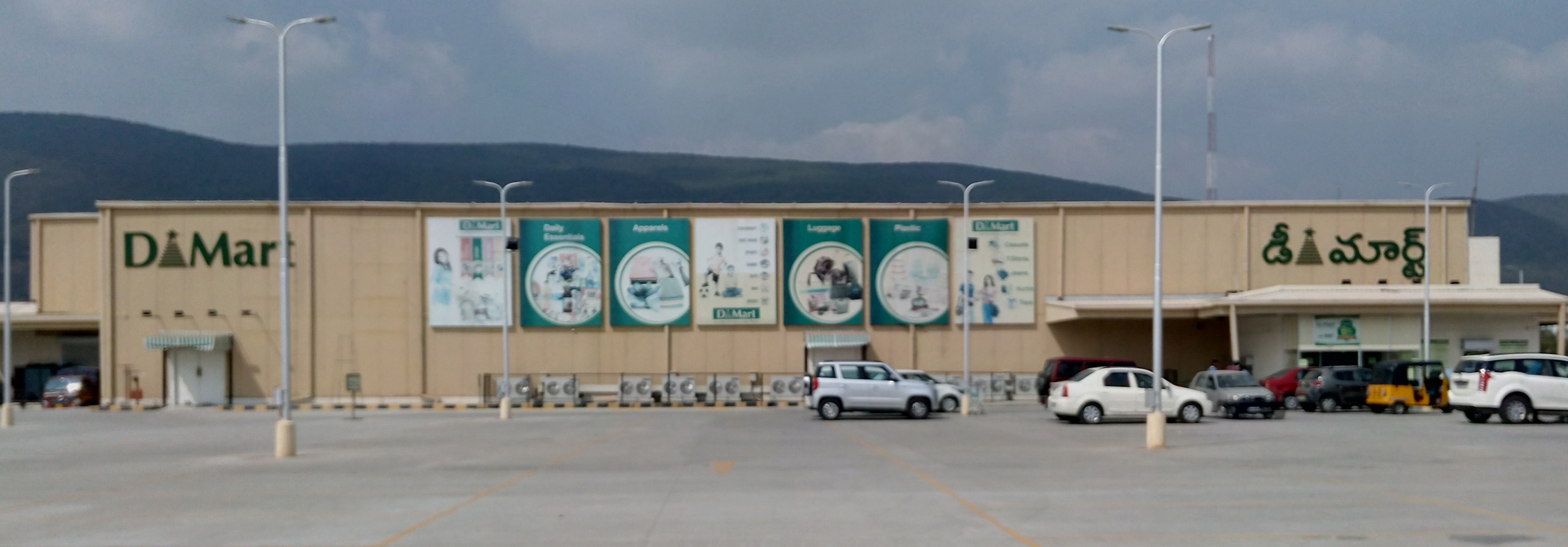
- A DMart store in Tirupati
- Trade name: DMart
- Type: Public
- Traded as: BSE: 540376; NSE: DMART
- ISIN: INE192R01011
- Industry: Retail
- Genre: Supermarket; Hypermarket
- Founded: 15 May 2002; 24 years ago
- Founder: Radhakishan Damani
- Headquarters: Powai, Mumbai, Maharashtra, India
- Number of locations: 500 (Apr 2026)
- Area served: India
- Key people: Radhakishan Damani (Chairman); Anshul Asawa (CEO)
- Revenue: ▲₹59,358 crore (US$6.2 billion) (2025)
- Operating income: ▲₹4,487 crore (US$470 million) (2025)
- Net income: ▲₹2,707 crore (US$280 million) (2025)
- Total assets: ▲₹24,891 crore (US$2.6 billion) (2025)
- Total equity: ▲₹22,230 crore (US$2.3 billion) (2025)
- Number of employees: 13,971 permanent and 59,961 contractual (2024)
- Website: www.dmartindia.com
- Footnotes; Financials as of 31 March 2025.

Avenue Supermarts Limited, doing business as DMart, is an Indian retail corporation that operates a chain of supermarkets and hypermarkets. The company was founded by Radhakishan Damani and is based in Mumbai. As of March 2026, DMart has 518 stores across 12 states and union territories in India.

In March 2024, the company had a total of 13,971 permanent employees and 59,961 employees hired on contractual basis.

== History ==
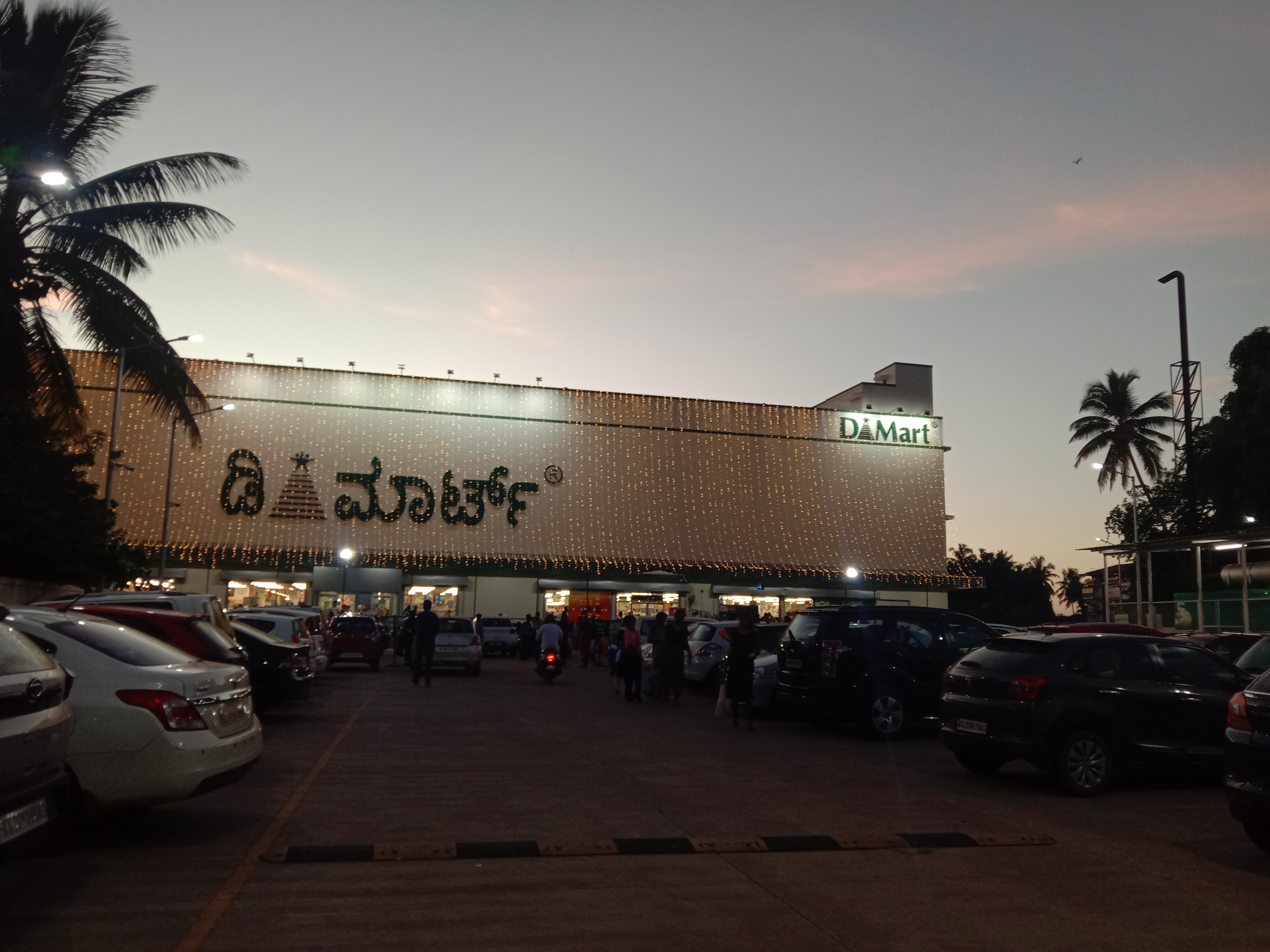
A DMart store in the suburbs of Udupi.

Incorporated in 2000 by Radhakishan Damani, DMart opened its first store in Powai, Mumbai, in 2002. In its early years, the company adopted everyday low price strategy and pursued "slow expansion", growing to 29 stores across Maharashtra and Gujarat in 2010. Unlike other Indian supermarkets which typically leased 4,000 sq ft properties, DMart operated much larger stores, ranging up to 30,000 sq ft, most of which it owned.

In 2013, DMart reported having 65 stores across Maharashtra and Gujarat, along with one store each in Hyderabad and Bangalore as it began expanding to other states. At the time, DMart became the third largest retail company by revenue, after Reliance Retail and Future Group.

In October 2016, DMart had 112 stores, having expanded to Telangana, Andhra Pradesh, Karnataka, Madhya Pradesh and Chhattisgarh. In December 2016, the company started its e-commerce venture called DMart Ready, allowing users to order groceries and household products online.

The company launched its initial public offering (IPO) in March 2017 and got listed on the National Stock Exchange and Bombay Stock Exchange. On its listing date 22 March 2017, it became the 65th most valuable Indian firm. By 2018, it entered Tamil Nadu, Rajasthan, Punjab, Delhi NCR and Daman.

In 2021, The Ken noted that DMart's newer stores ranged between 50,000 and 60,000 sq ft, nearly twice the average size of its existing stores. In 2022, DMart surpassed 300 stores, with three-fourths located in its cluster-states of Maharashtra, Gujarat, Telangana, Andhra Pradesh and Karnataka.. In April 2026, D-Mart touched 500 stores all over India.

== See also ==
- List of hypermarket
