= Radhakishan Damani =

Indian businessman (born 1955)

Personal details
- Born: 12 July 1955 (age 71) Bikaner, Rajasthan, India
- Spouse: Shrikantadevi Radhakishan Damani
- Children: 3
- Occupation: Businessman, investor
- Known for: Founder and Chairman of DMart

Radhakishan Shivkishan Damani (born 12 July 1955) is an Indian billionaire businessman and investor. He is the founder and chairman of retail chain DMart. His estimated net worth is US$14.8 billion as of September 2026, according to Forbes.

== Early life and career ==
Radhakishan Shivkishan Damani was raised in a Maheshwari Marwari Hindu family in a single room apartment in Mumbai. He studied commerce at the University of Mumbai but dropped out after one year. After the death of his father who worked on Dalal Street, Damani left his ball bearing business and became a stock market broker and investor. In the early 1990s, he made big profits by short-selling stocks that had been artificially inflated by Harshad Mehta. Damani was reportedly the largest individual shareholder of HDFC Bank after it went public in 1995.

In 1999, he operated a franchise of Apna Bazaar, a cooperative department store, in Nerul, but was "unconvinced" by its business model. He quit the stock market in 2000 to start his own hypermarket chain, DMart, setting up the first store in Powai in 2002. The chain had 25 stores in 2010, after which the company grew rapidly and went public in 2017.

In 2020, he became the fourth-richest Indian with a net worth of $16.5 billion. He was ranked #117 on the global list of billionaires. He was ranked #87 on the global list (Forbes) of billionaires 2022 with a net worth of $18.9 billion.

In October 2024, Damani and his family were ranked sixth on the Forbes list of India’s 100 richest tycoons, with a net worth of $31.5 billion.

== Investments ==
Damani also holds stakes in multiple companies, including VST Industries and India Cements. Damani publicly holds stakes in 14 companies; the value of his shareholding was about ₹2,140.49 billion (US$22 billion) in June 2024.

In 2020, Damani picked up a 1% stake in Andhra Paper. Damani also picked up 15% stake in India Cements in May 2020 taking his shareholding in India Cements to 19.89%.

In 2023, Damani bought 28 housing units in the luxury apartment Three Sixty West for ₹12.38 billion (US$130 million).

== Personal life ==
He is married to Shrikantadevi and they have three daughters.
