= Interio by Godrej =

Indian furniture company

- Formerly: Godrej Interio
- Company type: Private
- Industry: Retail, Furniture
- Founded: 1923; 103 years ago
- Headquarters: Mumbai, India
- Area served: Worldwide
- Key people: Swapneel Nagarkar (Business Head)
- Parent: Godrej Enterprises Group
- Website: www.interio.com

Interio by Godrej is a furniture and design brand for homes and workspaces in India, from the Godrej Enterprises Group. It offers residential interiors including furniture, kitchens, soft furnishings, and services and commercial and institutional environments including offices, schools, hospitals, laboratories, and turnkey AV solutions. It has a market share of 15 percent in the organised furniture segment.

Interio has the largest retail footprint across the country with 1000+ retail stores and serves customers both online and offline. It operates five manufacturing facilities at Mumbai, Khalapur and Shirwal in Maharashtra and, Haridwar and Bhagwanpur in Uttarakhand.

The brand has been recognised with 75+ design awards and has secured 900+ registered designs.

== History ==
The company started manufacturing furniture in 1923, with the Godrej Storwel cupboard. In the year 2006, Interio was established as a business unit of Godrej Enterprises Group.

The brand unveiled its refreshed brand identity in September 2025.

== See also ==
- Godrej Enterprises Group
