= Ardeshir Godrej =

Indian businessman

- Born: 1868; Bombay, British India
- Died: 1936 (aged 67–68)
- Occupation: Businessman
- Spouse: Bachubai Godrej

Ardeshir Burjorji Sorabji Godrej (1868–1936) was an Indian businessman. With his brother Pirojsha Burjorji, he co-founded the Godrej Brothers Company, the precursor of the modern Godrej Group.

== Early years ==
Ardeshir was born in 1868 as the first of six children to Burjorji and Dosibai Gootherajee. The Gootherajees were a wealthy Parsi family of Bombay (now Mumbai), and Ardeshir's father Burjorji and grandfather Sohrabji dealt in real estate. In January 1871, his father had the family name changed to Godrej.

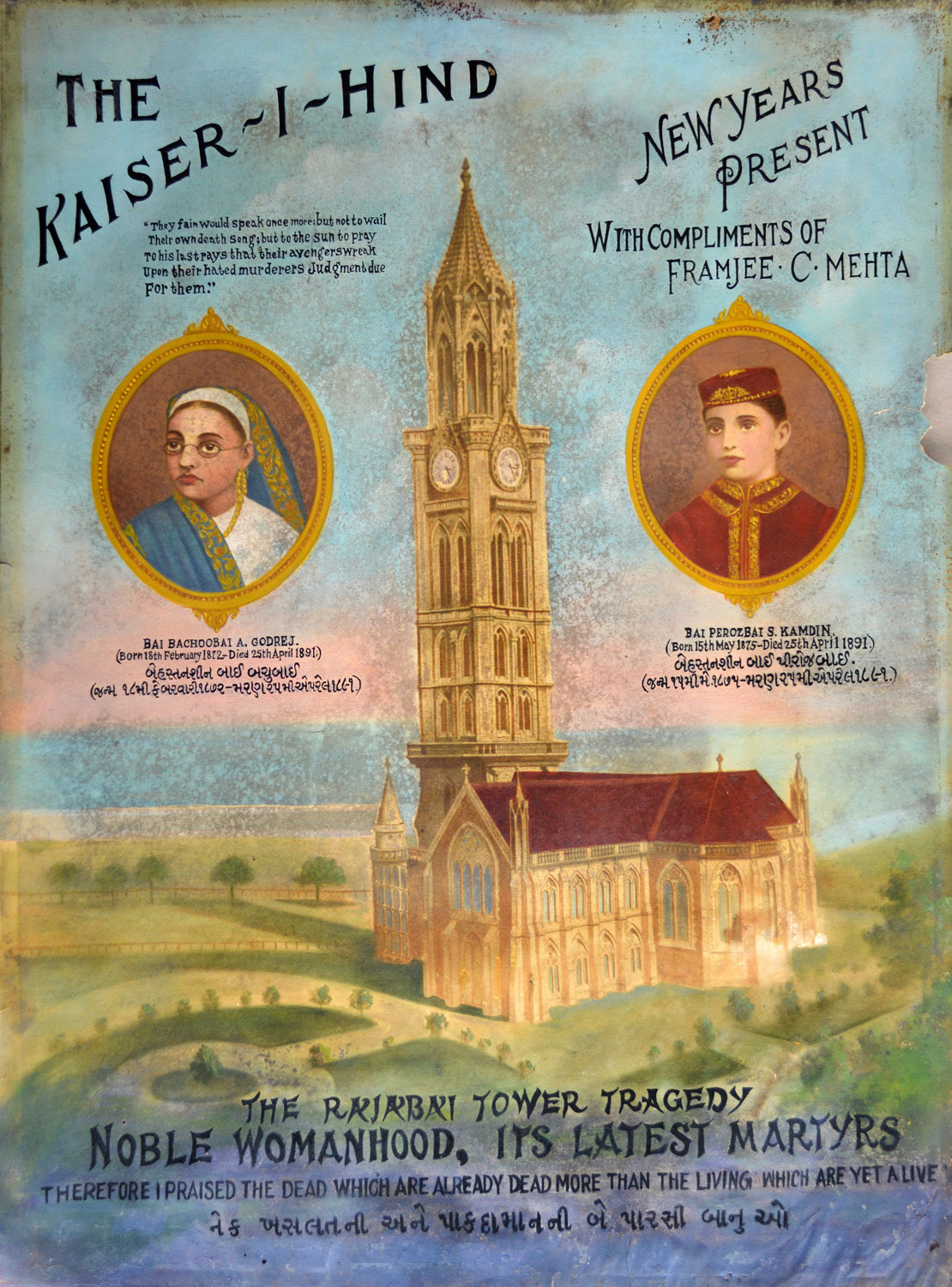
Illustration from the publication Kaiser-I-Hind about the Rajabi Tower deaths

In 1890, Ardeshir married Bachu (Bachubai), who had just turned eighteen. On 25 April 1891, Bachubai and Ardeshir's second cousin Pirojbai Sohrabji Kamdin decided to climb to the viewing platform of the 85-meter high Rajabai Tower. At the top, one or two miscreants accosted them. According to legend, rather than give into their demands, the two good-looking women jumped. Both lost their lives. Ardeshir rarely spoke of his loss, nor did he ever remarry. Ardeshir and Bachubai had no children.

== Career ==
In 1894, Ardeshir, fresh out of law school, was hired by a well-known firm to argue a case on a client's behalf in Zanzibar. The fine details of the case are not known, but according to his biography, it went well until, towards the end when Ardeshir refused to acknowledge (before the court) that his client had visited a particular place because there was no hard evidence that he had done so. As Ardeshir would later say, it required him to make an assumption that he could not with a good conscience make, and would thus be wrong. Not allowing himself to be convinced, the client had to find a replacement, and Ardeshir returned to Bombay and gave up the law altogether. As Ardeshir would later recall, "instead of seeing my side of the case, I saw both sides, the plaintiff's as well as the defendant's. In this divided state of mind, I realized I'd make a very poor lawyer, whichever side I took."

Upon returning to Bombay after the Zanzibar debacle, Ardeshir was employed at a pharmacy, where he served as an assistant to a chemist. In 1895, Ardeshir visited Merwanji Muncherji Cama, a friend of his father's, and who was highly respected for his business acumen. Ardeshir described his plan to manufacture surgical equipment and asked for a loan. When Cama asked why Ardeshir did not approach his father for the loan, Ardeshir replied that his father would give him the money not as a loan but as a gift, which Ardeshir was not willing to accept. This principle to not accept money as a gift would also become evident in 1918, when his father died: Ardeshir refused to accept the inheritance.

=== Locksmithing and the foundation of Godrej Brothers ===
With 3,000 Rupees ($1500 US in 1895) from Cama, Ardeshir began manufacturing "scalpels, forceps, pincers, scissors and the other implements of a surgeon's trade." When he was satisfied that the product fulfilled the necessary specifications, he asked for a meeting with the proprietor of the company he worked for, who, when they met, profoundly congratulated him on his accomplishment. But when Ardeshir insisted that the product be stamped "Made in India", the proprietor rebuked him: "you may be a first-class machinist, but we are discussing marketing here. Please don't misunderstand. I have high regard for your country. Now had this been, say, an Indian antique, I'd have said by all means blazon it in bold type as 'Made in India'. But surgical instruments, no way!" Both sides were intractable, and the venture died.

One morning Ardeshir read an article in a daily newspaper on the rise of burglary incidents in the city and in which the commissioner of police called for better security of homes and places of business. Ardeshir grasped that a better lock was needed, and began to research the subject. He soon discovered that the locks made in India were all fashioned by hand, a labour-intensive and inefficient means of manufacture, and Ardeshir resolved to manufacture a lock that would be guaranteed "unpickable". Calling on Merwanji Cama again, Ardeshir apologised for his inability to repay the loan immediately, but went on to describe his plans for the new lock-making venture. Cama was interested, as he too had read the article, and promised to raise the necessary capital. When Ardeshir rose to leave, Cama asked him, "Tell me, are there other lock-makers in our community? Or, are you the first?" Ardeshir replied, "I don't know whether I'm the first or not, but I'm certainly determined, with the help of a benefactor like you, to be the best." (Karanjia, 2001) With Cama's funds in hand, Ardeshir set out to revolutionise the Indian lock-manufacturing industry. In a 20 m^{2} (215 ft^{2}) shed next door to the Bombay Gas Works, with forty steam presses and a dozen skilled workers he had sent for from Gujarat and Malabar, production began on 7 May 1897. Ardeshir began with the manufacture of high security locks – under the Anchor brand – to which he attached a guarantee of "unpickability". Only later did he begin production of simpler and cheaper tumbler locks, to which he attached a note that their security was not guaranteed. The notes that he attached to the locks also attempted to clear up any misconceptions about the number of levers – as he put it, a well-made four-lever lock was infinitely more secure than a poorly made eight-lever lock. In addition, he guaranteed that each key/lock pair was unique, and that no key except those delivered with the lock would succeed in unlocking the device.

A few years later, Ardeshir patented the first of his inventions, a lock that would subsequently be called a "Gordian Lock". It came with two keys, both of which could lock and unlock the device, but the second key could also be used to modify the inner workings of the lock and so render the first key useless. Shortly thereafter, Ardeshir developed a lock based on Jeremiah Chubb's 1818 "Detector Lock" design, which, as the name suggests, made the owner aware of attempts to use an incorrect key. When one attempted to do so, a bolt was thrown that could only be released with the correct key, and only if the key was first turned as if to unlock the lock. Like Charles Chubb's patent of 1824, the Godrej lock didn't need a special "regulator" key to restore functionality. In a small booklet that Ardeshir published and often distributed himself, he claimed "the work is done on modern methods, with the aid of modern machinery with which the factory is equipped throughout at a very large outlay. We do not buy our locks or any safe parts ready-made, but we manufacture all our requirements ourselves. We have a large number of specially trained lock-makers having over 15 years of practice. This enables us to make our locks as accurately as those by the best European makers. Our keys are all deep-forged and machine-cut and not filed out by hand. We cut the keys first and make the locks to fit the keys. This makes our locks absolutely unpickable and ensures long wear."

=== Safes ===
In 1901, Ardeshir turned to experimenting with safes. Ardeshir resolved to build a safe that was not only burglarproof, but fireproof as well, which as he determined, most safes were not. Ardeshir made dozens of designs on paper and held innumerable discussions with his engineers and craftsmen, until it was finally determined that the only way to ensure security and stability was to make the safe out of a single sheet of steel. The resultant design had altogether sixteen bends, each side of the cross-shaped sheet being folded forward and then being folded twice more (inwards) to form the front door frame. Joints were welded, not riveted, and the coffer was covered by a second sixteen-bend sheet offset to the first by 90 degrees. The door was double plated, with the lock and hinges attached to the inner plate and the joints covered by the outer plate. The total weight was 1¾ tons. Altogether three patents covered the Ardeshir design. The first safes entered the market in 1902.

=== Innovation in locks ===
In July 1908, Ardeshir with his brother Pirojsha applied for and were granted (in October 1909) a British patent for the world's first springless lock. Until then, the levers in the locks were pushed into their resting place with springs, which were prone to dirt and breakage, that when jammed or broken, left the levers in an open position. Moreover, the varying resistance of the levers aided a skilled burglar that attempted to pick the lock. The springless lock, which in the patent certificate is attributed to Pirojsha, brought the brothers a fortune.

Around 1910, Ardeshir planned a trip to England, France and Germany to study the lock-making efforts of his competitors. Shortly before he left, Ardeshir visited Merwanji Cama again, this time to repay him for his 3,000 Rupee loan of so many years before. Cama was seriously ill, and refused to accept it, since – as Cama put it – accepting the money would deprive him of the joy he felt in having contributed to Ardeshir's success. Cama did however have a favour to ask: would Ardeshir hire Cama's nephew Boyce? "I can never say no to you," Ardeshir answered. "Maybe, we'll make him a partner." True to his promise, Ardeshir and Pirojsha did make Boyce a partner, and the company was renamed Godrej & Boyce Manufacturing Company. But Boyce didn't have an interest in the company, and soon after Ardeshir returned from his European travels, Boyce himself suggested that he leave the company. The name 'Godrej & Boyce Mfg. Co.' was retained.

=== Trip to England and subsequent development ===
In England, Ardeshir visited the Chubb factory in Wolverhampton, since Chubb, together with Milner, had the exclusive rights to export security equipment to India. Ardeshir was made to feel welcome, and given a guided tour of the manufacturing facilities, giving Ardeshir the chance not only to observe how his competitor did things, but also to determine weaknesses in their products. Ardeshir made copious notes, and upon returning to Bombay, implemented many of the methods he observed on his European tour. While he had been away Pirojsha had doubled the size of the factory, which now employed 600 people.

Following his trip, Ardeshir continued experimenting with safes, and the business took off following the San Francisco earthquake, where the subsequent fire caused more damage than the earthquake itself. Following the publication a subsequent article in Scientific American (26 May 1908) that revealed that most safes were in fact not fireproof, Ardeshir held a public demonstration to prove that their safes would protect the contents in the advent of a fire. The demonstration was a resounding success, but it would not be until the Calcutta Dharamtalla Street fire of April 1925 when the safes demonstrated their worth in that conflagration. The supreme test came in 1944, eight years after Ardeshir's death. The fires that resulted from an ammunition explosion at Bombay's Victoria docks raged for days, and the loss of life and property was enormous, but the contents in many of the Godrej safes survived, including one belonging to a bank.

=== Creation of Godrej Soaps ===
On 1 May 1928, Ardeshir transferred sole ownership and control of the company to his brother Pirojsha. He then moved to Nasik, 185 km north of Bombay, to try his hand at farming. Although that venture was unsuccessful, Ardeshir did not cease to be the inventor. When his attention was drawn to the fact that all soaps in the world contained tallow and other animal fats (inappropriate to many stringently vegetarian Hindus), he found a method to manufacture soap from vegetable oils, a procedure that everyone told him was impossible.

== Ardeshir and the Independence Movement ==
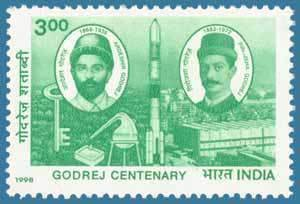
Ardeshir and Pirojshah Godrej featured on the centenary. commemorative postage stamp, 1998

Around 1909 Ardeshir read an article by Dadabhai Naoroji on the impoverishment of India through unfair trade practices and excessive taxation levied by the colonial authorities. His interest roused, Ardeshir applied to the J. B. Petit library for more material and obtained a transcript of a speech that Naoroji had made in 1876 while municipal councillor in Bombay. In the paper, Naoroji established that although India has a positive trade balance, the taxes that the colonial authorities levied consumed the advantage, leaving virtually nothing that could be invested.

Ardeshir was incensed and resolved that if India was ever to be independent, it would have to develop a local industry that was economically self-reliant. For Ardeshir, independence could not be achieved by simply boycotting British goods. Moreover, he "propagated the philosophy that every country, India or any other, had to choose its technology, production, consumption habits and marketing techniques depending on its resources and based on its genius" and that no country had the right to "coerce another to export its techniques, production and marketing systems." (Karanjia, 2001, preface)

Ardeshir was however not willing to accept that consumers should favour indigenous products just because they were indigenous. In an interview published in the Indian National Herald on 27 April 1927, Ardeshir was bitterly critical of the leaders of the Swadeshi movement who encouraged the acceptance of domestic products even if these were of substandard quality. In his opinion, there was absolutely no valid reason why Indian goods manufactured in India could not be as good as or better than those that were imported, and the encouragement to accept substandard goods was simultaneously the reinforcement of the idea that products made in India were automatically of lower quality than those manufactured abroad.

Ardeshir found the passivity of Gandhi's non-violence movement exasperating and insisted that India could become independent only if it actively made itself independent, and that self-reliance (Swadeshi) could only be achieved when accompanied by mental self-reliance, that is, self-respect.

== Death ==
Ardeshir Godrej died in 1936.

== Bibliography ==
- Karanjia, Burjor Khurshedji (2004). Vijitatma: Pioneer-founder Ardeshir Godrej. Bombay: Penguin. ISBN 0-670-05762-2.
  Portions of the book are available online.
- Phillips, Bill (2001). The Complete Book of Locks and Locksmithing (5th ed.). New York: McGraw-Hill. ISBN 0-07-137494-9.
