= Godrej Agrovet =

Indian animal feed and agribusiness company

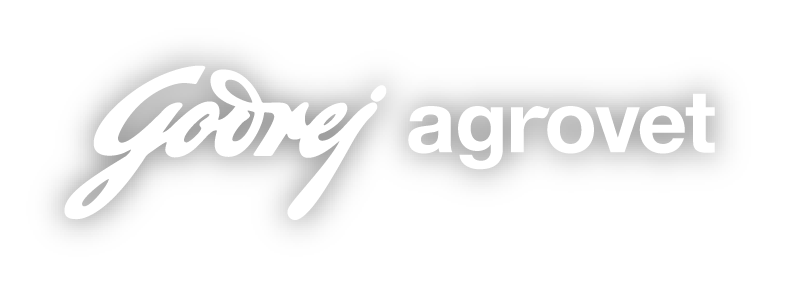
- Traded as: BSE: 540743; NSE: GODREJAGRO
- Industry: Agribusiness
- Founded: 1897
- Headquarters: Mumbai, India
- Key people: Nadir Godrej (chairman); Balram Yadav (managing director)
- Revenue: ▲₹9,561 crore (US$1.0 billion) (2024)
- Operating income: ▲₹473 crore (US$51 million) (2024)
- Net income: ▲₹359 crore (US$38 million) (2024)
- Total assets: ▲₹5,703 crore (US$610 million) (2024)
- Total equity: ▲₹2,516 crore (US$270 million) (2024)
- Parent: Godrej Industries Group
- Subsidiaries: Astec LifeSciences
- Website: www.godrejagrovet.com

Godrej Agrovet Limited is an Indian agribusiness company engaged in the animal feed and agribusiness sectors. It is part of the Godrej Group and is chaired by Nadir Godrej.

The company’s subsidiary, Astec LifeSciences, is involved in the manufacture of agrochemicals and active ingredients.

== Operations ==
=== Animal feed ===
The company operates in the animal feed segment, manufacturing compound feed and nutrition products for dairy cattle, broiler chicken, layer chicken and aquaculture.

Its manufacturing facilities include plants at Khanna (commissioned in 2013), Kharagpur, Baramati, Bengaluru, and Erode, with reported capacities of approximately 500 to 1,000 tonnes per day.

=== Poultry farms ===
Godrej Tyson food is the joint venture of Godrej Agrovet with Tyson Foods of USA. Set up in 2008, the company operates large-scale poultry farms and other meat processing facilities to cater to the Indian meat market. The poultry farms, which are highly automated and modern, manufacture and market packaged processed poultry products in India. The company offers a wide range of packaged products in the brand name of Good Chicken and Yummiez. The manufacturing plants are located in Mumbai and Bangalore.

The company has also entered the poultry sector in Bangladesh in a big way. It has forged a joint venture with the ACI Group, where it is rapidly becoming a key player in both animal feed and poultry breeding sectors.

=== Oil palm plantations ===
The company is one of the largest oil palm developers in India. The area under oil palm plantation is more than 55,000 hectares spread across Telangana, Andhra Pradesh, Karnataka, Tamil Nadu, Goa, Maharashtra, Orissa and Mizoram. The company works directly with the farmers for oil palm production. Very recently in Mizoram, the company have commissioned a mill, which is the largest private sector industrial facility in Mizoram.

=== Crop Protection Business ===
The Crop Protection Business segment comprises specialized agro-chemicals, which have a market presence in terms of plant growth promoters, soil conditioners, and cotton herbicides. Godrej Agrovet is one of the leading global manufacturers and marketers of Homobrassinolides. Godrej Agrovet leads the market in selective post-emergence cotton herbicides in India and has a 50% market share for the Triacontanol category.

=== Subsidiaries ===
The company’s subsidiaries include Astec LifeSciences, which manufactures active ingredients and intermediates for the agrochemicals industry. Godrej Agrovet acquired a 45.29% stake in the company in 2015, increasing its shareholding to 62.33% by May 2021.

== Organizational structure ==
Currently Balram Singh Yadav is heading the business as managing director of the company. Adi Godrej and Nadir Godrej are the chairmen of the Godrej group and Godrej Agrovet respectively. The company have more than 3000 employees and a network of over 10,000 rural distributors/dealers, who works for different business of the company.

== IPO and stock market listing ==
Godrej Agrovet launched its IPO on 4 October 2017 and closed on 6 October 2017. Its IPO size was 1157 Crore and got listed on 16 October 2017.
