= Godrej & Boyce =

Subsidiary of Godrej Group

Godrej & Boyce Mfg. Co. Ltd.
- Type: Private ltd.
- Industry: Aerospace; Defense; IT Services; Green Infrastructure; Appliances; Godrej Interio; Real Estate; Security Solutions; Process Equipment; Intra Logistics; Precision Engineering
- Founder: Ardeshir Godrej
- Headquarters: Mumbai, Maharashtra, India
- Key people: Jamshyd Godrej (Chairman & Managing Director), Navroze Godrej, Vijay Crishna, Nyrika Holkar, Anil Verma;
- Products: Home Appliances; Furniture; Security products; Systems for Aerospace; Industrial Logistics; Infrastructure Development
- Brands: Godrej Interio; Godrej Appliances; Godrej Locks; Godrej Security Solutions; U&US India Circus
- Revenue: ▲₹11,800 crore (US$1.2 billion) (2021–22)
- Number of employees: 12,000+
- Parent: Godrej Enterprises Group
- Website: www.godrejandboyce.com

Godrej & Boyce (G&B) is the flagship company of the Godrej Group. Established in 1897 in Mumbai, Maharashtra, G&B is a privately held company with a presence across 10 industries – from building complex and custom engineering solutions for critical industries like aerospace, defence, clean energy, railways and automotive to manufacturing branded goods.

Headquartered in Pirojshanagar at Vikhroli, Mumbai, India, Godrej and Boyce also offers products in Europe, U.S., Middle East, Africa and South East Asia.

Mr. Jamshyd Godrej is the company's chairman and managing director.

== History ==
Godrej & Boyce's (G&B) was founded in 1897. G&B's story began as part of India's Swadeshi movement – the original 'Make in India' movement. Founded by Ardeshir Godrej (1868–1936), a serial innovator and inventor along with his brother Pirojsha Burjorji Godrej, who focused on manufacturing. They patented the world's first springless lock, built the first indigenously manufactured fire and burglar resistant safe in India, and later invented a process to make soap from vegetable oil.

Pirojsha's son Naval Godrej laid the foundation for the urban township of Pirojshanagar in Vikhroli, Mumbai, where the company's global headquarters and key operations are located today.

In Business Today B.K. Karanjia, in his book, Godrej: A Hundred Years, quotes a testimonial: A survivor of another fire in 1914 says of the family safe: "Being Godrej's, we were confident the papers [inside] would be found intact, but some of us had doubts about the safety of the pearls. On opening the safe, we were all agreeably surprised to see that the pearls were perfectly safe and as lustrous as before the fire." Even King George V and Queen Mary used a Godrej safe to store valuables on their 1911 India visit for the Delhi durbar.

== Sustainability ==
Godrej & Boyce aims to generate over 1/3rd of its overall revenues from environment friendly products. Apart from this, G&B has supported a skilling initiative called Disha for more than ten years. As a part of its Good & Green strategy, the company focuses on three pillars:

1. Ensuring employability
2. Building a greener India
3. Innovating for Good & Green Products

== Business units ==
- Godrej Aerospace
- Godrej Appliances
- Godrej Construction
- Godrej Electrical & Electronics
- Godrej Interio
- Godrej Locking Solutions & Systems
- Godrej Lawkim Motors
- Godrej Material Handling
- Godrej Precision Engineering
- Godrej Process Equipment
- Godrej Security Solutions
- Godrej Storage Solutions
- Godrej Tooling
- Godrej Vending
- Godrej Infotech

== Major subsidiaries and affiliates ==
- Godrej Infotech Ltd.
- Veromatic International B.V.
- Godrej (Singapore) Pte. Ltd.
- Godrej (Vietnam) Co. Ltd.
- Godrej & Khimji (Middle East) LLC.
- Godrej Americas Inc.
