= Godrej Industries Group =

Indian holding company

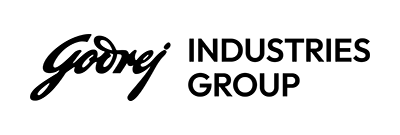
- Type: Public
- Traded as: BSE: 500164; NSE: GODREJIND
- ISIN: INE233A01035
- Industry: Conglomerate
- Founded: Godrej Group, established in 1897, and Godrej Industries Group, formed in 2024.
- Headquarters: Mumbai, Maharashtra, India
- Key people: Adi Godrej; Nadir Godrej; Pirojsha Godrej; Tanya Dubash; Nisaba Godrej; Burjis Godrej; Manish Shah; Vishal Sharma; Gaurav Pandey; Karan Singh Bolaria; Sumit Mitra; Kunal Karnani
- Services: Agribusiness; Consumer goods; Real estate; Financial services; Chemicals
- Revenue: ▲₹15,064 crore (US$1.6 billion) (2022)
- Operating income: ▲₹1,081 crore (US$120 million) (2022)
- Net income: ▲₹707 crore (US$76 million) (2022)
- Total assets: ▲₹34,047 crore (US$3.6 billion) (2022)
- Total equity: ▼₹7,126 crore (US$760 million) (2022)
- Subsidiaries: Godrej Chemicals; Godrej Agrovet; Godrej Consumer Products; Godrej Properties; Godrej Capital; Godrej Ventures; Godrej Wealth
- Website: www.godrejindustries.com

Godrej Industries Group is an Indian conglomerate headquartered in Mumbai, with business interests across consumer goods, chemicals, real estate, agriculture, financial services, and investments.

Ardeshir Godrej founded the business in 1897, which grew into a diversified business group over the following decades. In 2024, the Godrej Group underwent restructuring following a family settlement agreement between members of the Godrej family, resulting in the separation of business interests into two independent entities: Godrej Industries Group and Godrej Enterprises Group.

Godrej Industries Group comprises a portfolio of businesses, including Godrej Consumer Products, Godrej Properties, Godrej Agrovet, Godrej Chemicals, Godrej Ventures, Godrej Capital, and Godrej Wealth. Its businesses operate across Asia, Africa, and Latin America and serve over 1.4 billion consumers globally.

== History ==
The Godrej business was founded in 1897 by Ardeshir Godrej in Mumbai. The initial venture involved the manufacture of locks. In the early years of the business, the company developed indigenous manufacturing capabilities and introduced security products such as safes, at a time when such products were largely imported into India.

In 1918, Ardeshir Godrej launched a soap made from vegetable oils. In the early decades of the 20th century, the business expanded into additional product categories. In 1951, the company was commissioned to manufacture ballot boxes for India’s first general election.

Godrej Chemicals, the chemicals business of Godrej Industries Group, was established in 1963 and manufactures oleochemicals from its plants at Valia in Gujarat and Ambernath in Maharashtra.

Godrej Properties was established in 1990 as the real estate development arm of the Godrej Group, and was listed on the stock exchanges in 2010 following an initial public offering.

Godrej Agrovet was incorporated on November 25, 1991, and officially commenced its diversified agribusiness operations in 1992.

Godrej Consumer Products Limited was formed in April 2001 through the demerger of the consumer products division of Godrej Soaps Limited, under a scheme approved by the Bombay High Court.

Godrej Ventures and Investment Advisers Private Limited was incorporated on 17 June 2015 and is headquartered at Godrej One.

Godrej Capital Limited was incorporated in 2020 and is headquartered in Mumbai.

== Brand Realignment ==
In April 2026, Godrej Industries Group introduced a refreshed brand identifier at Godrej One in Mumbai. The refresh followed the 2024 family realignment and introduced a unified identity across the group's businesses in consumer goods, real estate, chemicals, financial services, and agribusiness. As part of the initiative, the group adopted a new purpose statement, "Crafting tomorrow since 1897".

Alongside the group purpose, Godrej Industries Group introduced purpose statements for its businesses. Godrej Agrovet introduced "Crafting abundance through innovation that empowers farmers and nourishes our nation"; Godrej Capital introduced "Crafting prosperity through fair, fast, and flexible financing"; Godrej Chemicals introduced "Crafting innovative chemistry for a sustainable future"; Godrej Consumer Products introduced "Crafting the goodness of health and beauty for consumers in emerging markets"; Godrej Properties introduced "Crafting spaces that spark joy, one community, one family, one home at a time"; and Godrej Ventures introduced "Crafting inspiring spaces that elevate creativity, community, and sustainability.”

The group follows a dual-brand system, under which the Godrej signature logo continues to be used across all consumer-facing products and services, while the GI identifier serves as a corporate group identifier for professional stakeholders such as investors and the media, appearing alongside the Godrej signature logo or company name.

Alongside the brand refresh, Godrej Industries Group outlined its five-year growth ambitions. The group stated targets of more than 15% annual sales growth, more than 20% earnings per share growth, and a return on equity of more than 18% across its businesses. It also announced plans to expand from three publicly listed companies to five listed platforms and set a goal of achieving a combined market capitalisation of ₹5 lakh crore by 2031.

== Businesses ==
Godrej Industries Group operates through a portfolio of businesses across sectors including agribusiness, real estate, chemicals, financial services, and investments.

Godrej Chemicals manufactures oleochemicals and related products used in industries including home care, personal care, food, and beverages.

Godrej Properties is engaged in real estate development, with residential and commercial projects across multiple Indian cities.

Godrej Agrovet Limited (GAVL), a subsidiary of Godrej Industries, operates across five business segments: Animal Nutrition, Crop Care, Foods, Oil Palm business, and Astec LifeSciences. The company manufactures animal feed, develops crop protection solutions, cultivates and processes oil palm, produces dairy and poultry products through its Foods business and manufactures agrochemical active ingredients, intermediates, and formulations through Astec LifeSciences. Godrej Jersey is the dairy brand of Creamline Dairy Products Limited (CDPL), a Hyderabad-based subsidiary of Godrej Agrovet. The brand's products include milk, ghee, paneer, and milk-based drinks, with operations across Telangana, Andhra Pradesh, Tamil Nadu, Karnataka, and Maharashtra.

Godrej Consumer Products Limited (GCPL) is an Indian multinational consumer goods company headquartered in Mumbai. Its products span personal care, hair care, home care, and pet care, including household insecticides, air care, fabric care, personal wash and hygiene products, hair colour, and dog food. Its brands include Goodknight, HIT, and aer in home care; Cinthol and Godrej No.1 in personal care; Godrej Expert in hair colour; and Ezee in fabric care.

Godrej Ventures is a real estate private equity firm investing global institutional capital in the Indian real estate market. It manages five funds focused on investments in office and residential properties across India.

Godrej Capital Limited operates in the financial services sector, offering lending products across housing loans, secured and unsecured loans for small and medium enterprises (SMEs), construction finance, supply chain finance, and personal loans.[10] The group's lending operations are housed under Godrej Capital Limited, comprising Godrej Housing Finance Limited, a housing finance company, and Godrej Finance Limited, a non-banking financial company (NBFC).

On 2 June 2026, Godrej Industries Group launched Godrej Wealth, its wealth management business operating under Godrej Investments Ltd, a subsidiary of Godrej Industries Group. The business operates alongside Godrej Capital as part of the group's financial services platform. It serves affluent and high-net-worth individuals, including entrepreneurs, business families, and non-resident Indians, with investable assets of ₹2 crore and above. Its offerings include wealth management, succession and legacy planning, private market investments, global investment opportunities, and portfolio structuring. At the launch event, the business announced a target of managing ₹1 lakh crore in assets under management by 2031 and expanding to 35 locations across India over the following five years.

Godrej DEI Lab was set up in October 2023 as an initiative of Godrej Industries Group focused on diversity, equity, and inclusion in workplaces. Its first year involved research, partnerships, and support for organisations on workplace inclusion. On its first anniversary, the Lab launched the DEI Directory, a publicly accessible, searchable repository of more than 500 resources on workplace inclusion, covering gender, disability, and LGBTQIA+ inclusion, comprising reports, books, videos, podcasts, and information on DEI consultants and service providers. Alongside the Directory, the Lab introduced Spotlight, a storytelling initiative documenting inclusion practices at Indian organisations. Early case studies covered Biocon Biologics' growth in women's representation and the Lalit Group's skilling of LGBTQIA+ individuals for hospitality roles. The Lab is headed by Parmesh Shahani. At Pride@Godrej 2026, held at Godrej One in June 2026, the group introduced the Queer India Fellowship, an annual leadership programme by the Godrej Foundation in partnership with Godrej DEI Lab. The 12-month programme supports emerging queer leaders through mentorship, training, and access to industry experts, with a focus on sectors where queer representation has historically been limited.

Godrej Foundation is a philanthropic trust associated with the Godrej Industries Group, holding a 15% shareholding in the group. In May 2026, the foundation launched Tomorrow Makers, a programme to identify and support students from disadvantaged backgrounds through partner organisations across STEM, Invention and Making, Arts, and Indian Defence Services.

Good & Green is the sustainability strategy of Godrej Industries Group. Introduced in 2011, it is centred on environmental sustainability and inclusive growth through a shared value approach. Its programmes include resource efficiency, renewable energy, water conservation, waste management, skills development, and community initiatives across the group's businesses. As of FY2025, the group reported a 37% reduction in Scope 1 and Scope 2 greenhouse gas emissions and a 41% reduction in water use intensity compared with its FY2012 baseline. It also reported processing 100% of plastic packaging waste introduced into the market under India's Extended Producer Responsibility (EPR) framework and recycling or reusing 100% of non-hazardous waste generated from its manufacturing operations.

== Corporate Social Responsibility ==
Godrej Industries Group undertakes its sustainability and social responsibility initiatives through programmes focused on environmental sustainability, resource efficiency, and community development.

The group's sustainability programme was subsequently expanded to include value chain initiatives involving suppliers, logistics, and consumers, with a focus on promoting sustainable practices beyond its operations.

The group has committed to reducing absolute greenhouse gas emissions in line with science-based targets and has set an internal net-zero target for 2035. It has also undertaken initiatives related to carbon reduction, resource efficiency, and water conservation, including programmes across multiple Indian states, and reports returning more water to the environment than it withdraws.

In 2025, Godrej Industries Group, in collaboration with the Brihanmumbai Municipal Corporation, the Bhamla Foundation, and the United Nations Environment Programme, launched the #BeatPlasticPollution campaign to address plastic waste and promote sustainable consumption practices.

Godrej Consumer Products partnered with the Home Insect Control Association on an initiative promoting the safe disposal of plastic waste.

== Corporate Governance ==
The financial results are reviewed by the Audit Committee prior to approval by the Board.

Godrej Industries Group makes disclosures to stock exchanges, including BSE Limited and the National Stock Exchange of India Limited, in compliance with the Securities and Exchange Board of India (Listing Obligations and Disclosure Requirements) Regulations, 2015.

Regulatory filings are authorised by the Company Secretary and Compliance Officer.

== Leadership ==
Adi Godrej is the Chairman Emeritus of the Godrej Industries Group.

Nadir Godrej is Chairman Emeritus of Godrej Industries Group.

Pirojsha Godrej is Executive Chairperson of Godrej Industries Limited and Chairperson of Godrej Industries Group. He also serves as Chairperson of Godrej Properties, Godrej Capital, and Godrej Ventures.

Tanya Dubash is Executive Director of Godrej Industries and Chief Brand Officer of the Godrej Industries Group.

Nisaba Godrej serves as Executive Chairperson of Godrej Consumer Products and Non-Executive Director, Godrej Industries.

Burjis Godrej is Chairperson of Godrej Agrovet and Non-Executive Director, Godrej Industries.

Karan Singh Bolaria is Managing Director and CEO of Godrej Ventures.

Sunil Kataria serves as Managing Director and CEO of Godrej Agrovet.

Manish Shah serves as Managing Director and CEO of Godrej Capital.

Aasif Malbari is Managing Director & CEO of Godrej Consumer Products

Vishal Sharma serves as Executive Director and Chief Executive Officer of Godrej Industries (Chemicals).

Gaurav Pandey serves as Managing Director and CEO, Godrej Properties.

Sumit Mitra serves as Group Head – Human Resources and Corporate Services.

Kunal Karnani is Chief Executive Officer of Godrej Wealth.

== Financial Performance ==
In the financial year ended 31 March 2026, Godrej Industries Limited reported consolidated revenue of ₹22,237 crore, up from ₹19,657 crore the previous year. Including income from investments and other sources, total income was ₹25,980.60 crore. Profit before tax was ₹3,393.43 crore, and the company's share of profit for the year was ₹1,240.53 crore.

== Awards ==
Astec LifeSciences Limited, a subsidiary of Godrej Agrovet, was awarded the EcoVadis Gold Medal for sustainability and environmental, social, and governance (ESG) performance, placing it among the top 5% of companies assessed globally.

At the 2025 South Asia SABRE Awards, Godrej Industries Group received the Diamond SABRE Award for Company of the Year for From Stories to Leadership: Building Reputation the Godrej Way. Other group businesses, including Godrej Consumer Products, Godrej My Farm, Godrej Professional, and Godrej L'Affaire, also received awards across practice and industry categories.

Godrej Consumer Products, a subsidiary of Godrej Industries Group, was ranked first globally in the personal products category on the Dow Jones Best-in-Class Indices 2025, based on S&P Global’s Corporate Sustainability Assessment.

In CDP's 2025 disclosure cycle, Godrej Agrovet received an A− rating for Climate and Forests, Godrej Consumer Products received an A− Climate rating, and Godrej Chemicals received a B rating for Climate Change and Water Security disclosures.

The Godrej Chemicals plant at Valia received the GreenCo Platinum rating under the Confederation of Indian Industry's Green Company Rating System in 2022, becoming the first chemical manufacturing facility in India to achieve the certification. The Godrej Consumer Products plant at Malanpur holds a GreenCo Gold rating.

Godrej Industries Group won eight awards, including seven Golds, at the BW Marketing World Excel Awards 2024.

Godrej Industries Group won six Gold awards and one Silver award, including the Corporate Communications Team of the Year award, at the IMAGEXX Summit & Awards 2026.

At the 2026 South Asia SABRE Awards, Godrej Industries Group received the Diamond SABRE Award for Company of the Year and won awards in the Corporate Image, Diversity Communications, and Food & Beverage categories.

At the ET Kaleido Awards 2026, Godrej Industries Group received awards across industry and practice categories for campaigns by Godrej Agrovet, Godrej Properties, Godrej Consumer Products, and Godrej L'Affaire.
