= B. K. Karanjia =

Indian journalist

Burjor Khurshedji Karanjia (21 December 1919 – 25 June 2012) was an Indian film journalist and editor. He was the editor of Filmfare for 18 years, followed by Screen which he edited for 10 years. He also remained the chairman of the National Film Development Corporation of India (NFDC).

== Early life and background ==
Karanjia was born and brought up in Quetta (now in Pakistan). He was named after his maternal grandfather, Burjorji Patel, a merchant in the Baluchistan region of British India. His family shifted to Bombay (now Mumbai) following the Partition of India in 1947. Here he lived in South Bombay in a building known as 'Quetta Terrace', close to the Jinnah House, along with his brother R. K. Karanjia, who became a noted investigative journalist and founded Blitz. He studied at Wilson College, Mumbai and it was here that he first developed interest in films. In 1934, a group of students from the college were taken on a study tour to Bombay Talkies studio in Malad. There he saw the shooting of German director Franz Osten's film Always Tell Your Wife with Najmal Hussain and Devika Rani, which left him mesmerised.

== Career ==
Karanjia started his career with the Indian Civil Services (ICS) after passing the exam in 1943, however within a few months of joining, he left services as he didn't enjoy the work in the Supplies department. He instead joined as a literary assistant in the National War Front organisation in India. Subsequently, he chose to become a film journalist. In between, he also joined the Godrej Group, as publicity manager at their Malaysia factory.

In time he became the editor of the film magazine Filmfare, a Times of India publication, where he worked for the next 18 years. During his tenure, the magazine almost doubled its circulation and he even tried to sort out the scandals associated with the Filmfare Awards.

After his retirement from Filmfare, Ramnath Goenka offered him a stint as an editor at Screen of Indian Express group. Here for 10 years, he offered constant criticism to the film industry through his editorials. He went on to start two film magazines, Cine Voice and Movie Times; but these were started without much infrastructure and Karanjia ended up losing a lot of his family inheritance in these ventures. He also authored several books on the Indian film industry and several biographies.

Karanjia was the founder of the Film Finance Corporation, which later became the NFDC with him as its chairman. In time, it started financing art films made on a low budget, initiating what is now known as Parallel cinema, through the late 1970s and '80s.

The film Pestonjee starring Anupam Kher, Naseeruddin Shah and Shabana Azmi, was based on his story about two Parsi friends. He also wrote dialogues of the film and co-wrote the screenplay with the director Vijaya Mehta. At the 35th National Film Awards, it won the award for Best Feature Film in Hindi. His well-received autobiography, Counting My Blessings was published in 2005.

== Personal life ==
B. K. Karanjia was married to Abad (Allbless). He lived in Bandra, a Mumbai suburb. Later in life, after the death of his wife in 2005, he shifted to Sopan Baug area in Pune in 2007, where he died at Jehangir hospital at the age of 92. He was survived by daughters, Routton and Delshad, and son Yuzud. His elder brother, Russi died five years prior to him.

== Bibliography ==
- B. K. Karanjia (1970). More of an Indian: A Novel. Sindhu Publications.
- B. K. Karanjia (1970). Rustom Masani: Portrait of a Citizen. Popular Prakashan.
- B. K. Karanjia (1989). Masks and faces (a collection of short stories). Vikas Pub. House. ISBN 9780706946673.
- B. K. Karanjia (1986). A many-splendoured cinema. New Thacker's Fine Art Press.
- B. K. Karanjia (1990). Blundering in Wonderland. Vikas Publishing House. ISBN 978-0-7069-4961-2.
- B. K. Karanjia (1997). Godrej: The builder also grows. Penguin Books.
- B. K. Karanjia (1998). Give me a Bombay merchant anytime!: the life of Sir Jamsetjee Jejeebhoy, Bt., 1783–1859. University of Mumbai.
- B. K. Karanjia (2000). Final victory: the life and death of Naval Pirojsha Godrej. Viking. ISBN 9780670896448.
- Braham S. Sood; B. K. Karanjia (2000). An alien in Bollywood: an autobiography (of the spouse of Kamini Kaushal). UBS Publishers' Distributors. ISBN 9788174762764.
- Sohrab Pirojsha Godrej; B. K. Karanjia (2001). Abundant living, restless striving: a memoir. Viking. ISBN 9780670912056.
- B. K. Karanjia (2004). Vijitatma: founder-pioneer Ardeshir Godrej. Viking. ISBN 9780670057627.
- B. K. Karanjia (2005). Counting My Blessings. Penguin Books India. ISBN 978-0-670-05849-5.
