= Jamshyd Godrej =

Indian entrepreneur

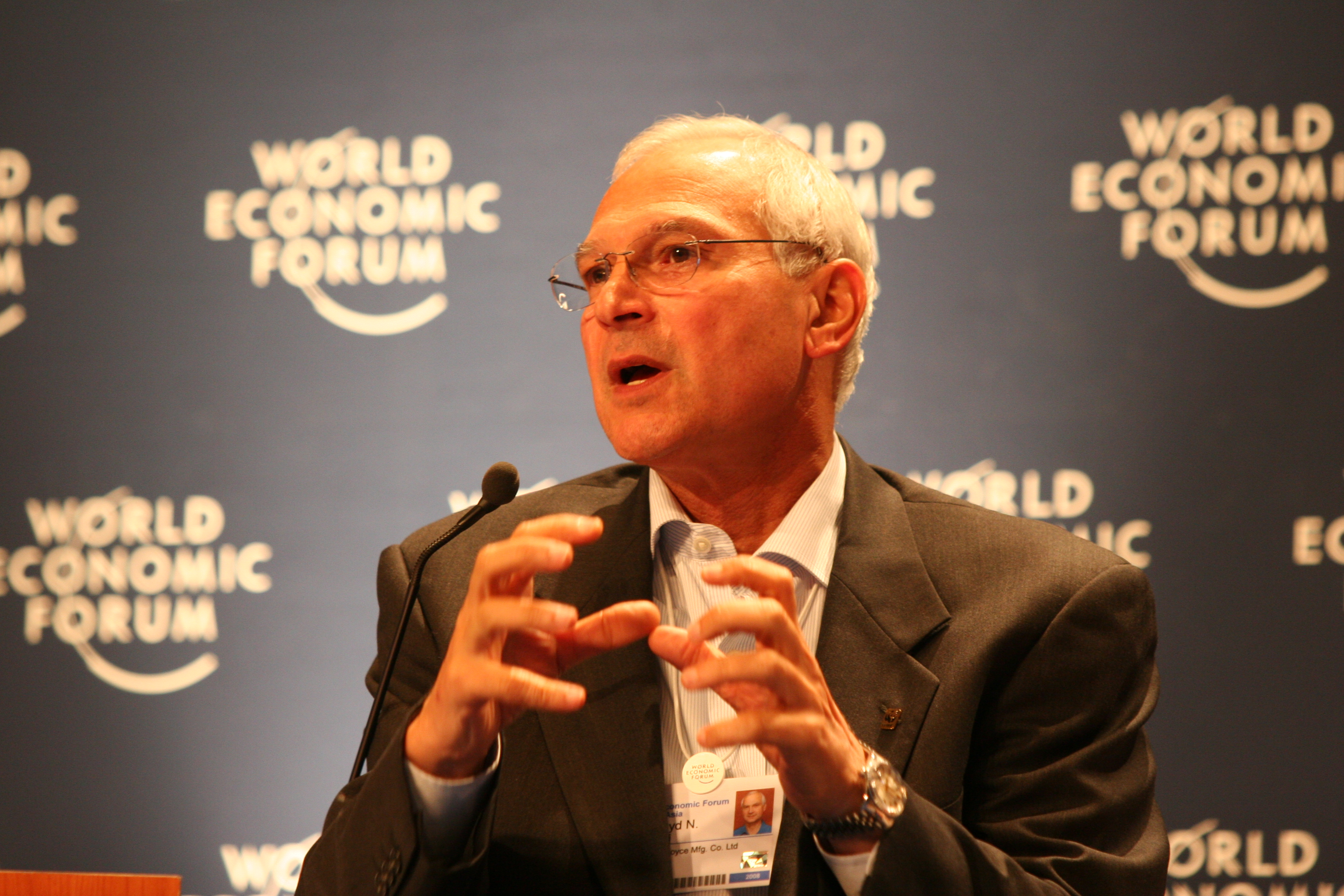
- Education: Cathedral & John Connon School; Illinois Institute of Technology
- Occupation: Chairman of Godrej & Boyce
- Spouse: Pheroza Godrej
- Children: Navroze Godrej Raika Godrej
- Parent: Naval Godrej Soonuben Godrej

Jamshyd Naoroji Godrej is an Indian industrialist and member of the Godrej family, currently serving as managing director and chairman of Godrej & Boyce, the holding company of the Godrej group. Godrej & Boyce is a diversified business with a presence across 10 industry sectors.

In October 2024, Jamshyd Godrej and Smita Crishna Godrej were ranked 22nd on the Forbes list of India's 100 richest tycoons, with a net worth of $11.1 billion.

== Early life ==
Jamshyd Godrej was born in Mumbai, India. He completed his schooling at the prominent Cathedral & John Connon School. He attended the Illinois Institute of Technology, where he studied mechanical engineering. He was appointed as the director of Godrej & Boyce in 1974, later becoming the managing director in 1991 and chairman in 2000. In 2012, Godrej resigned from the board of Haldia Petrochemicals, despite the prompting efforts by the government of Bengal to retain him.

== Career ==
Jamshyd joined the Board of Godrej & Boyce Manufacturing Company Limited as a director in 1974. He led the group in the areas of home appliances, consumer durables, office equipment, industrial products, consumer products and services. He is currently the chairman and managing director of Godrej & Boyce Manufacturing Company Limited. He is also the chairman of the CII Sohrabji Godrej Green Business Centre.

In 2012, Forbes estimated his net worth to be $4.8 billion.

== Awards ==
In 2003, he received India's third highest civilian honor, the Padma Bhushan.

== Green activities ==
Godrej is on the boards of the World Resources Institute and Aspen Institute; in 2012, Forbes magazine named him one of the richest green billionaires on the basis of the valuable mangrove swamps the Godrej family has owned and preserved in Vikhroli, Mumbai. He is vice president of the World Wide Fund for Nature. In partnership with the World Resources Institute, whose Indian division he chairs, he has supported sustainable forms of public transport in India, including bus rapid transport schemes, through funding relevant institutions and lobbying the Ministry of Urban Development.

He is on the board of directors at World Resources Institute India (WRI India), and serves as the chairman of the board of directors for the Council On Energy, Environment and Water.

== Personal life ==
Jamshyd is married to Pheroza J. Godrej and has two children, son Navroze Godrej and daughter Raika Godrej. He is known for his fondness of yachting.
