= Godrej Enterprises Group =

Indian multinational conglomerate

- Type: Private
- Industry: Conglomerate
- Founded: 1897; 129 years ago
- Founders: Ardeshir Godrej; Pirojsha Burjorji Godrej
- Headquarters: Mumbai, Maharashtra, India
- Area served: Worldwide
- Key people: Jamshyd Godrej (Chairman & Managing Director); Nyrika Holkar (Executive Director); Anil Verma (Executive Director & CEO)
- Services: Aerospace; Aviation; Defense; Energy; Security; Construction; Information Technology; Furniture
- Number of employees: 16,000
- Subsidiaries: Godrej & Boyce
- Website: www.godrej.com

Godrej Enterprises Group is an Indian multinational conglomerate headquartered in Mumbai. G&B was founded in 1897 by Ardeshir Godrej and Pirojsha Burjorji Godrej. The company is known for developing one of the earliest springless locks and manufacturing refrigerators in India.

In 2024, the Godrej family restructured its businesses, forming two independent entities: Godrej Enterprises Group and Godrej Industries Group. Jamshyd Godrej serves as the Chairperson and Managing Director of GEG, while Nyrika Holkar is the Executive Director.

GEG operates in over 60 countries across five continents and has business interests in aerospace, defence, energy, security, and consumer durables through its flagship company, Godrej & Boyce, and its affiliates. In 2024, the company introduced a new identity with a purple logo while retaining its cursive signature design.

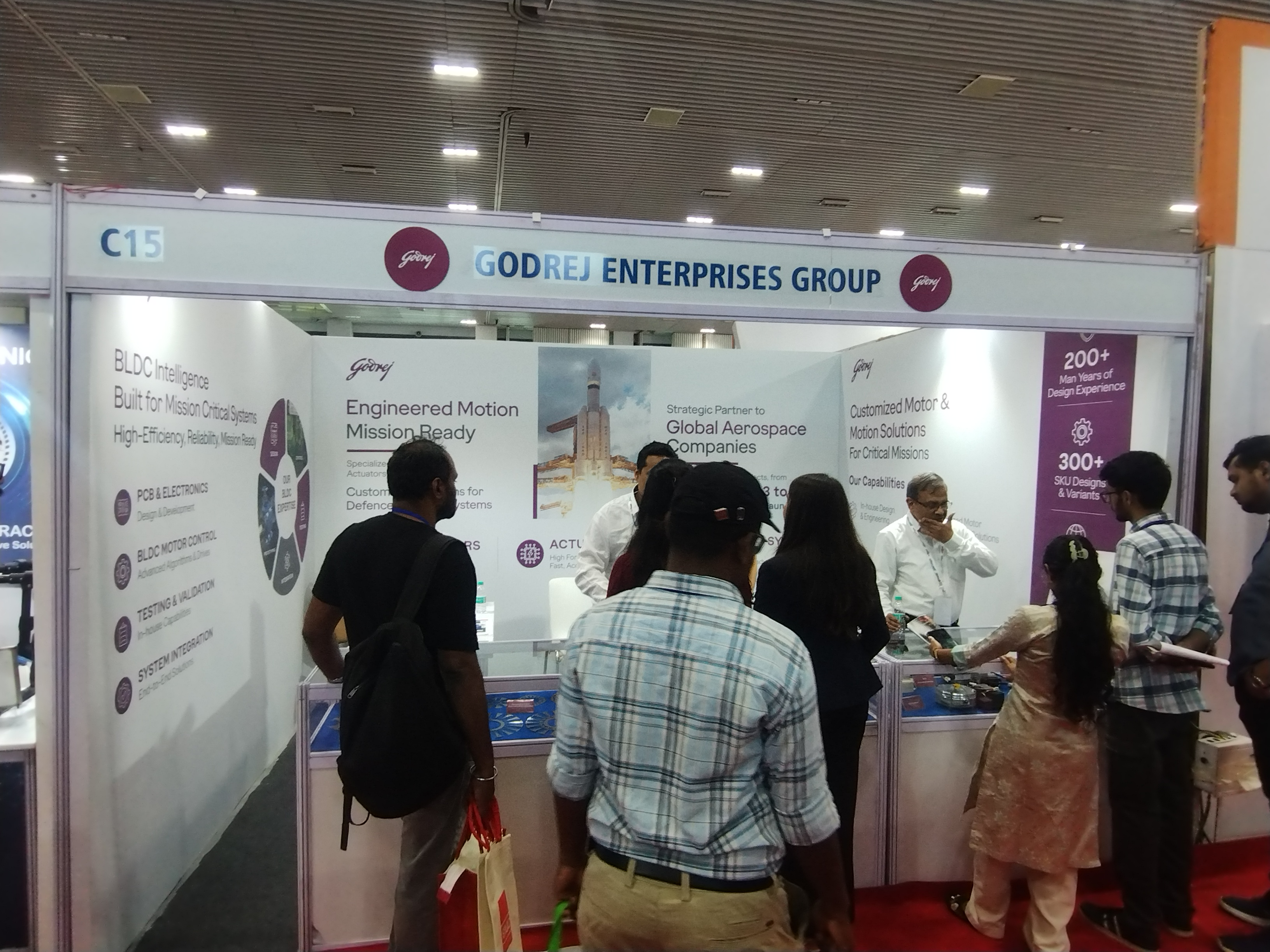
Godrej Enterprises Group at DEF-TECH Bharat 2026, KTPO, Bengaluru

== History ==
Godrej & Boyce (G&B), the flagship company of Godrej Enterprises Group, was founded in 1897 by Ardeshir Godrej and his brother Pirojsha Burjorji Godrej, who managed the company’s manufacturing operations. Established during the Swadeshi movement, the company grew as part of India's early industrialization efforts.

In its early years, Godrej & Boyce developed an early version of the springless lock and India’s first fire- and burglar-resistant safe. Over time, it expanded into various industries, including aerospace, where it has collaborated with the Indian Space Research Organisation (ISRO) for over three decades.

Under the leadership of Pirojsha’s son, Naval Godrej, the company expanded further with the development of Pirojshanagar, an industrial township in Vikhroli, Mumbai, which now serves as its headquarters.

=== Restructuring and formation of GEG ===
In April 2024, the Godrej family announced the restructuring of the Godrej Group into two separate entities: Godrej Enterprises Group (GEG) and Godrej Industries Group (GIG). Jamshyd Godrej became the Chairperson and Managing Director of GEG, while Nyrika Holkar was appointed Executive Director. GEG oversees Godrej & Boyce and its various business verticals.

== Business operations ==
Godrej Enterprises Group operates through its flagship company, Godrej & Boyce, along with its affiliated businesses. The group operates in various industries, including aerospace and aviation, defense, energy, security solutions, construction, furniture, and information technology.

Appliances: Godrej entered the home appliances sector in 1958, with the production of refrigerators. Its product range later expanded to include air conditioners, washing machines, and kitchen appliances.

Locks & Security Solutions: The group's operations in security solutions began in 1897, with the manufacturing of locks. It later expanded into residential and commercial security systems.

Real Estate: The company is engaged in real estate development and leasing.

Aerospace: Established in 1985, Godrej Aerospace manufactures components for India's space and defense programs. The company has supplied high-precision parts for missions such as Mangalyaan and Chandrayaan to the Indian Space Research Organisation (ISRO). It also develops components for the defense and aviation industries.

Furniture: Godrej began manufacturing furniture in 1923, with the introduction of the Godrej Storewel cupboard. In 2006, Godrej Interio was established as a dedicated furniture division, providing furniture for residential and commercial use in India.

Vending: The group produces automated vending machines for beverages and food, catering to workplaces and public spaces.

Information Technology: Godrej Infotech, a subsidiary of Godrej & Boyce, provides IT services, including business process consulting, infrastructure management, and application development. It primarily serves industries such as manufacturing, retail, and distribution.
