= List of Amar Chitra Katha comics =

This is a list of titles in the Indian Amar Chitra Katha comic book series published by India Book House and Amar Chitra Katha Ltd. The series was started by Anant Pai in 1967. The publication years listed are for the earliest verifiable edition or reprint for which an ISBN or other catalog listing is available. Subsequent reprintings may have later years listed. Some titles have also been published in Indian languages.

ACK Junior is a separate series of comics and chapter books with similar titles and themes but which adopt a visual and storytelling style appropriate for very young children. Those issues are not considered to be part of the main ACK catalog. For slightly older children, Amar Chitra Katha has collaborated with Rupa Publications and HarperCollins India to release chapter book versions of some of their most popular specials.

Starting in September 2025, the company started releasing audio book versions of their comics in partnership with Audible. The initial release included 111 of the most popular issues recorded in English and Hindi, and focused on collections like The Ramayana, Mahabharata, Mahadeva, Jataka Tales, Panchatantra, and Hitopadesha. Releases in Marathi, Bengali, Telugu and Tamil started 2026, along with animated shorts in all languages. In 2026, issues based on the Jataka Tales were released in Sinhala.

Several issues and specials have been published in partnership with government, military, charitable, academic, and corporate institutions. Some of these are for internal circulation only, and are not available for sale to the general public. The company also releases special volumes and box sets containing collections of comic strips featuring characters from Tinkle magazine. Others have been released to celebrate festivals, commemorative days, and events of national or historic importance.

Two major fires have resulted in the loss of materials. In 1994, a fire at the offices of India Book House destroyed the artwork for several unreleased issues. On October 1 2025, a fire broke out at the Amar Chitra Katha archives. The original illustrations and other archival material of the first 200 Amar Chitra Katha issues and many Tinkle Issues were destroyed. However, these had already been digitized.

== List of Individual Issues ==
As of 2025, at least 512 individual issues have been published (502 of them in English). The numbering scheme has been revamped multiple times.

- 436 issues were released between 1967 and 1991 (426 in English). Some of these were reprints from other marques published by India Book House like Chaturang Katha.
- After 1991, most issues were re-released under a new numbering scheme starting at 501. No new issues were released until 1998, when issue 679 became the first new issue to be released in 7 years.
- From 1998 to 2009, very few new issues were released, and certain old issues received digital re-releases numbered DG451 to DG476.
- From 2010 to 2014, regular publication of new issues resumed. Since then, new issues have been released sporadically. From 1998 to 2025, 68 new titles have been published.
- There are cases of multiple issues having the same catalog number or the same issue being re-released with a new title and catalog number. Certain numbers are missing from the catalog. Both new issues and reprints of numbered issues sometimes lack numbering.

The table below shows the numbering as part of both the old and new series. Subtitles are sometimes changed in newer editions and reprints.

Individual Issues
Old Series Number	New Series Number	Title	Subtitle	Notes	Year
1	NA	Jack & The Bean Stalk		^{A}	1967
2	NA	Cinderella		^{A}	1967
3	NA	Little Red Riding Hood		^{A}	1967
4	NA	Aladdin & His Lamp		^{A}	1967
5	NA	The Magic Fountain		^{A}	1967
6	NA	The Three Little Pigs		^{A}	1967
7	NA	The Sleeping Beauty		^{A}	1967
8	NA	The Wizard of Oz		^{A}	1967
9	NA	Pinocchio		^{A}	1967
10	NA	Snow White & Seven Dwarfs		^{A}	1967
11	501	Krishna	Retold from the Bhagawat Purana		1969
12	530	Shakuntala	The Forgotten Wife		1970
13	626	The Pandava Princes	Pandu's Five Brave Sons		1970
14	511	Savitri	The Perfect Wife		1970
15	504	Rama	Retold from The Ramayana		1970
16	507	Nala Damayanti	The Steadfast Lovers		1971
17	577	Harishchandra	The King Who Chose Rags Over Riches		1971
18	503	The Sons of Rama	Luv and Kush - The Invincible Twins		1971
19	502	Hanuman	The Epitome of Devotion and Courage		1971
20	582	Mahabharata	The Great Epic of India		1971
21	508	Chanakya	The Kingmaker		1971
22	510	Buddha	He Lit The Path		1971
23	564	Shivaji	The Great Maratha		1971
24	563	Rana Pratap	He Fought For Freedom		1971
25	604	Prithviraj Chauhan	A Legend of Valour and Chivalry		1971
26	531	Karna	Brave, Generous, Ill-Fated Prince		1972
27	661	Kacha & Devayani	Star-Crossed Lovers		1972
28	568	Vikramaditya	Courage and Honour Win the Day		1972
29	506	Shiva Parvati	A Story of Divine Love		1972
30	674	Vasavadatta	The Princess Who Captivated a True Kshatriya		1972
31	532	Sudama	The Power of True Friendship		1972
32	588	Guru Gobind Singh	The Tenth Sikh Guru		1972
33	627	Harsha	A Gallant King of Kanauj		1972
34	534	Bheeshma	Selflessness Personified		1972
35	533	Abhimanyu	Star-Crossed Prince		1972
36	535	Mirabai	She Gave Her Heart to Krishna		1972
37	536	Ashoka	The Warrior Who Spoke of Peace		1973
38	537	Prahlad	A Tale of Devotion from the Bhagawat Purana		1973
39	540	The Jackal & the War Drum	Panchatantra Stories of Courage and Curiosity		1973
40	682	Tanaji	The Maratha Lion		1973
41	DG451	Chhatrasal	A Story of Courage and Valour		1973
42	764	Parashurama	Sixth Incarnation of Vishnu		1973
43	734	Banda Bahadur	A Valiant Sikh Warrior		1973
44	605	Padmini	A Tale of Love and Honour		1973
45	543	Monkey Stories	Jataka Tales of Wile and Wisdom		1973
46	769	Valmiki	The Author of the Ramayana		1973
47	590	Guru Nanak	The Founding Guru of Sikhism		1973
48	NA	Tarabai	The Valorous Queen of Rajasthan		1973
49	726	Ranjit Singh	The Lion of Punjab		1974
50	698	Ram Shastri	Crusader For Justice and Truth		1974
51	539	Rani of Jhansi	The Flame of Freedom		1974
52	629	Uloopi	The Naga Princess Who Fell In Love With Arjuna		1974
53	729	Baji Rao I	The Warrior Peshwa		1974
54	685	Chand Bibi	The Fearless Queen		1974
55	623	Kabir	He Spoke of Tolerance and Mercy		1974
56	746	Sher Shah	Able Statesman, Brave Warrior		1974
57	565	Drona	Valiant Archer, Supreme Teacher		1974
58	566	Surya	How the Sun God Was Tamed		1974
59	612	Urvashi	The Apsara Who Fell In Love With a King		1974
60	656	Adi Shankara	A Light In the Darkness		1974
61	592	Ghatotkacha	The Chivalrous Demon		1974
62	551	Tulsidas	The Poet Who Wrote the Ram Charit Manas		1974
63	759	Sukanya	The Princess Who Married A Sage		1974
64	739	Durgadas	The Loyal Courtier		1974
65	663	Aniruddha	Beloved Grandson of Krishna		1974
66	738	Zarathushtra	God's Messenger From Ancient Persia		1974
67	541	The Lord of Lanka	The Rise and Fall of a Demon King		1974
68	SI	Tukaram	Famous Poet-Saint of Maharashtra		1974
69	763	Agastya	Renowned Among the Saptarshi		1974
70	657	Vasantasena	A Dancer and Her Most Precious Jewel		1974
71	567	Indra & Shachi	The Lord of Heaven and His Devoted Wife		1974
72	542	Draupadi	The Dusky Firebrand		1974
73	758	Subhadra	Beloved Sister of Krishna and Balarama		1975
74	773	Ahilyabai Holkar	Saint-Queen of Malwa		1975
75	552	Tansen	The Musical Gem		1975
76	810	Sundari	The Girl Who Became A Warrior		1975
77	544	Subhas Chandra Bose	Born to Lead		1975
78	SI	Shridatta	Retold from the Kathasaritsagara	^{J}	1975
79	555	Deer Stories	Jataka Tales of Gentle Wisdom		1975
80	599	Vishwamitra	The King Who Became an Ascetic		1975
81	591	The Syamantaka Gem	The Sun God's Precious Ornament		1975
82	594	Mahavira	The Warrior of Non-Violence		1975
83	598	Vikramaditya's Throne	A Special Seat For a Special Monarch		1975
84	705	Bappa Rawal	A Great Rajput Hero		1975
85	673	Ayyappan	The Lord of Shabarimala		1975
86	655	Ananda Math	A Patriotic Novel by Bankim Chandra		1975
87	559	Birbal the Just	Tales About Birbal		1975
88	515	Ganga	The Divine Beauty		1975
89	509	Ganesha	The Remover of All Obstacles		1975
90	631	Chaitanya Mahaprabhu	The Miracle Messenger of Love		1975
91	556	Choice of Friends	Tales from the Hitopadesha		1975
92	706	Sakshi Gopal	His Love Wrought a Miracle		1975
93	666	Kannagi	Her Love Conquers All		1975
94	SI	Narsinh Mehta	Poet-Saint of Gujarat		1975
95	779	Jasma of the Odes	A Famous Legend of Gujarat		1975
96	811	Sharan Kaur	The Selfless Spy		1975
97	697	Chandrahasa	Faith Cannot Be Vanquished		1976
98	NA	Pundalik & Sakhu	Two Famous Saints of Maharashtra		1976
99	823	Raj Singh	A Historical Romance by Bankim Chandra		1976
100	768	Purushottam Dev & Padmavati	Their Ally Was Jagannatha		1976
101	546	Vali	The Downfall of an Arrogant King		1976
102	SI	Nagananda	An Adaptation of Harsha's Famous Sanskrit Play		1976
103	569	Malavika	A Play by Kalidasa		1976
104	606	Rani Durgavati	The Brave and Wise Queen		1976
105	570	Dasharatha	The Story of Rama's Father		1976
106	630	Rana Sanga	The Valiant Warrior-King		1976
107	760	Pradyumna	Son of Krishna		1976
108	632	Vidyasagar	Scholar and Social Reformer of Bengal		1976
109	753	Tachcholi Othenan	A Legendary Hero of Kerala		1976
110	725	Sultana Razia	Empress of India		1976
111	550	Sati & Shiva	Perfection Rewarded		1976
112	516	Krishna & Rukmini	A Love That Will Not Be Denied		1976
113	596	Raja Bhoja	A Patron of the Arts and Literature		1976
114	694	Guru Tegh Bahadur	The Gentle Sikh Warrior		1976
115	762	Pareekshit	Son of Abhimanyu		1976
116	814	Kadambari	An Adaptation of Banabhatta's Sanskrit Classic		1976
117	571	Dhruva & Ashtavakra	They Reached For the Skies		1976
118	664	King Kusha	A Jataka Story About Inner Beauty		1976
119	727	Raja Raja Chola	Destined For Greatness		1976
120	624	Dayananda	His Strength Was His Virtue		1977
121	815	Veer Dhaval	An Adaptation of Nath Madhav's Famous Novel		1977
122	572	Ancestors of Rama	A Noble Inheritance		1977
123	790	Ekanath	Poet-Saint and Social Activist		1977
124	812	Satwant Kaur	The Tale of an Unlikely Friendship		1977
125	621	Udayana	Love Overcomes All Odds		1977
126	554	Elephant Stories	Jataka Tales of Nobility		1977
127	505	The Gita	The Song of Eternal Wisdom	^{L}	1977
128	692	Veer Hammir	The Noble Warrior		1977
129	SI	Malati and Madhava	The Famous Sanskrit Play by Bhavabhuti		1977
130	547	Garuda	Vishnu's Divine Mount		1977
131	545	Birbal the Wise	The Adventures of Akbar's Favorite Minister		1977
132	DG452	Ranak Devi	The Story of a Great Queen of Saurashtra		1977
133	633	Tales of Maryada Rama	The Fairest Judge of All		1977
134	757	Babur	The Founder of the Mughal Dynasty		1977
135	659	Devi Choudhurani	The Bandit Queen		1977
136	548	Rabindranath Tagore	India's Gentle Torch-Bearer		1977
137	613	Soordas	The Blind Bard		1977
138	562	The Brahmin & the Goat	Tales from the Panchatantra		1977
139	SI	Prince Hritadhwaja	Retold from the Markandeya Purana		1977
140	789	Humayun	The Second Great Mughal		1977
141	761	Prabhavati	The Asura Princess		1977
142	686	Chandra Shekhar Azad	Freedom Was His Mission		1977
143	607	A Bag of Gold Coins	Ancient Tales of Wisdom and Adventure		1977
144	DG453	Purandara Dasa	The Father of Carnatic Music		1977
145	766	Bhanumati	Granddaughter of Krishna		1977
146	517	Vivekananda	He Kindled the Spirit of Modern India		1977
147	518	Krishna & Jarasandha	Krishna Outsmarts His Fierce Adversary		1977
148	701	Noor Jahan	The Light of the World		1977
149	519	Elephanta	The Island of Shiva		1977
150	520	Tales of Narada	Tales of Devotion and Rivalry		1977
151	636	Krishnadeva Raya	The Illustrious King of Vijayanagara		1978
152	557	Birbal the Witty	Tales About Birbal		1978
153	579	Madhvacharya	A Vaishnava Saint-Philosopher		1978
154	634	Chandragupta Maurya	The Determined Prince		1978
155	723	Jnaneshwar	Founder of the Bhakti Movement In Maharashtra		1978
156	724	Bagha Jatin	The Tiger Revolutionary		1978
157	822	Manonmani	An Adaptation of Sundaram Pillai's Manonmaniyam		1978
158	521	Angulimala	The Bandit Who Took Refuge in Buddha		1978
159	622	The Tiger & the Woodpecker	Animal Tales From a Telugu Classic		1978
160	512	Tales of Vishnu	The Gentle God		1978
161	635	Amrapali and Upagupta	Chosen By Buddha		1978
162	637	Yayati	Retold From the Mahabharata		1978
163	560	How the Jackal Ate the Elephant	Tales from the Panchatantra		1978
164	549	Tales of Shiva	The Mighty Lord of Kailasa		1978
165	638	King Shalivahana	The Man Who Started an Era		1978
166	748	The Rani of Kittur	The Defiant Queen		1978
167	522	Krishna & Narakasura	Confidence Versus Arrogance		1978
168	677	The Magic Grove	A Jain Tale About Destiny		1978
169	684	Lachit Barphukan	Legendary Commander of Assam		1978
170	755	Indra & Vritra	The Demon Who Terrorised the Gods		1978
171	681	Amar Singh Rathor	Of Rajput Pride and Honour		1978
172	639	Krishna & the False Vasudeva	Pride Meets Its Doom		1978
173	794	Kochunni	The Highwayman With a Heart		1978
174	703	Tales of Yudhishthira	Justice for the Pandava		1978
175	774	Hari Singh Nalwa	The Gallant General		1978
176	514	Tales of Durga	Tales of the Mother Goddess		1978
177	589	Krishna & Shishupala	He Was Forgiven a Hundred Times		1978
178	523	Raman of Tenali	The Birbal of the South		1978
179	640	Paurava and Alexander	Battle of the Giants		1978
180	524	Indra & Shibi	Tales of the Wise Lord of Heaven		1978
181	791	Guru Har Gobind	Soldier-Saint of the Sikhs		1978
182	DG454	The Battle for Srinagar	A Heroic Story From 1947		1979
183	676	Rana Kumbha	The Pillar of Rajput Pride		1979
184	652	Aruni and Uttanka	Tales of Devotion and Reward		1979
185	620	How Friends are Parted	Tales From the Hitopadesha		1979
186	DG455	Tiruppan and Kanakadasa	Two Tales of Devotion		1979
187	741	Tipu Sultan	The Tiger of Mysore		1979
188	611	Babasaheb Ambedkar	He Dared to Fight		1979
189	785	Thugsen	A Folk Tale From Maharashtra		1979
190	DG456^{G}	Kannappa	The Devotee Who Offered His Eyes to Lord Shiva		1979
191	796	The King in a Parrot's Body	A Jain Tale		1979
192	NA	Ranadhira	The Valorous King of Mysore		1979
193	720	Kapala Kundala	The Fearless Child of the Forest		1979
194	641	Gopal & the Cowherd	A Delightful Bengali Folktale		1979
195	553	Jackal Stories	Jataka Tales of the Sly and the Shrewd		1979
196	781	Hothal	The Story of a Celestial Dancer		1979
197	784	The Rainbow Prince	Folk Tales From Bengal		1979
198	525	Tales of Arjuna	The Exploits of an Exceptional Warrior		1979
199	719	Chandralalat	The Boy With the Moon On His Forehead		1979
200	603	Akbar	A Visionary Monarch		1979
201	702	Nachiketa	A Collection of Stories from the Upanishads		1979
202	600	Kalidasa	Master Poet and Dramatist		1979
203	653	Jayadratha	Retold From the Mahabharata		1979
204	642	Shah Jahan	Emperor, Soldier, and Master Builder		1979
205	643	Ratnavali	A Royal Prophecy is Happily Fulfilled		1980
206	693	Jayaprakash Narayan	A Soldier For Justice		1980
207	526	Mahiravana	A Magician Outwitted		1980
208	NA	Jayadeva	Author of the Famous Gita-Govinda		1980
209	644	Gandhari	A Mother Blinded By Love		1980
210	558	Birbal the Clever	Tales About Birbal		1980
211	711	The Celestial Necklace	How a Promise Must Be Kept		1980
212	718	Basaveshwara	The Revolutionary Social Reformer		1980
213	749	Velu Thampi	The Courageous Diwan of Travancore		1980
214	527	Bheema & Hanuman	The Sons of Vayu, The Wind God		1980
215	687	Panna & Hadi Rani	Of Loyalty, Honour, and Love		1980
216	750	Rani Abbakka	The Queen Who Knew No Fear		1980
217	817	Sukhu & Dukhu	Folk Tales From Bengal		1980
218	574	The Magic Chant	Lessons In Living from the Jataka Tales		1980
219	645	Lokamanya Tilak	Firebrand Nationalist		1980
220	528	Kumbhakarna	The Sleeping Giant		1980
221	658	Jahangir	The Gentle Mughal		1980
222	DG457	Samarth Ramdas	Shivaji's Spiritual Guide	^{J}	1980
223	717	Baladitya & Yashodharma	Bane of the Hunas		1980
224	619	Nandivishala	Jataka Tales - Wit and Wisdom From Buddhist Lore		1980
225	601	Tales of Sai Baba	The Saint of Shirdi		1980
226	581	Raman the Matchless Wit	The Adventures of a Unique Court Jester		1980
227	DG458^{G}	Sadhu Vaswani	Sage of Modern India		1980
228	618	Birbal to the Rescue	The Master Psychologist		1980
229	742	Shankar Dev	Preaching the Religion of Love		1981
230	765	Hemu	Brilliant Strategist, Shrewd Statesman		1981
231	683	Bahubali	He Gave Up His Empire To Learn The Truth		1981
232	788	Dara Shukoh & Aurangzeb	The Tale of Two Brothers and an Empire		1981
233	585	The Dullard	Tales from the Panchatantra		1981
234	608	Bhagat Singh	The Cheerful Young Martyr		1981
235	716	The Adventures of Agad Datta	Jain Tales of Long Ago		1981
236	NA	Bahman Shah	The Founder of the Bahamani Dynasty		1981
237	584	Gopal the Jester	The Brilliant Bengali Wit		1981
238	609	Friends & Foes	Animal Tales from the Mahabharata		1981
239	795	Hakka & Bukka	Founders of the Vijayanagar Empire		1981
240	782	Sahasramalla	Trickster and Thief - A Jain Tale		1981
241	787	Balban	Iron Man of the Slave Dynasty		1981
242	561	Crows & Owls	Tales from the Panchatantra		1981
243	715	Ramanuja	A Great Vaishnava Saint		1981
244	593	The Pandavas in Hiding	Outwitting a Wily Enemy		1981
245	SI	Tyagaraj	Poet-Saint and Social Activist		1981
246	575	The Giant and the Dwarf	A Jataka Tale of Wit and Wisdom		1981
247	586	Stories of Wisdom	Right Thinking From the Jataka Tales		1981
248	775	Bidhi Chand	The Honourable Thief		1981
249	662	The Learned Pandit	Tales told by Sri Ramakrishna		1981
250	770	Sambhaji	Valiant Son of Shivaji		1981
251	651	The Adventures of Baddu & Chhotu	Who Is the Smarter One		1981
252	529	Kartikeya	A Son of Shiva		1981
253	670	The Golden Mongoose	Tales of Duty From the Mahabharata		1981
254	513	Hanuman to the Rescue	Hanuman Brings The Sanjeevani		1981
255	808	The Mystery of the Missing Gifts	Folk Tales From Madhya Pradesh and Karnataka		1981
256	DG459	Sakhi Sarwar	A Folk Tale From Punjab		1981
257	714	The Queen's Necklace	A Collection of Jataka Tales		1982
258	809	The Secret of the Talking Bird	A Folk Tale From Karnataka		1982
259	804	The Miraculous Conch	A Game of Chess		1982
260	595	Sri Ramakrishna	The Saint of Dakshineswar		1982
261	713	The Fool's Disciples	Tales of Sense and Nonsense		1982
262	721	Rash Behari Bose	Independent India Was His Lifelong Dream		1982
263	743	The Prince & the Magician	The Strange Adventures of a Young Prince		1982
264	617	The Hidden Treasure	Jataka Tales - Wisdom Wins a War		1982
265	DG460	Echamma the Brave	A Historical Tale From the South		1982
266	803	Manduka	The Accidental Astrologer		1982
267	646	The Pandit & the Milkmaid	Tales told by Sri Ramakrishna		1982
268	597	Tales of Shivaji	The Legendary Maratha Warrior-King		1982
269	576	The Mouse Merchant	A Jataka Tale		1982
270	707	The Tiger-Eater	Brain Beats Brawn		1982
271	647	Lal Bahadur Shastri	The Gentle Warrior	^{L}	1982
272	802	Andher Nagari	The City of Darkness		1982
273	538	The Churning of the Ocean	Vishnu Saves Creation		1982
274	578	Kesari, The Flying Thief	Tales of Enlightenment		1982
275	708	Subramania Bharati	The Tamil Voice of Freedom		1982
276	772	The Pig and the Dog	Animal Tales from Arunachal Pradesh		1982
277	616	Tales of Misers	A Collection of Jataka Tales		1983
278	688	Bimbisara	Model King of Magadha		1983
279	573	Bird Stories	Jataka Tales of Brain Versus Brawn		1983
280	820	Kumanan	The King Who Loved Poetry		1983
281	DG461	Shunahshepa	Retold From The Aitareya Brahmana		1983
282	SI	The Taming of Gulla	Retold from a Kannada Classic		1983
283	709	Jagannatha of Puri	Dreamt By a King, Sculpted By the Gods		1983
284	777	Albert Einstein	He Never Stopped Questioning		1983
285	DG462	Joymati	A Tale From Assam		1983
286	DG463	Thanedar Hasan Askari	The Police Officer Who Never Knew Fear		1983
287	771	The Pious Cat	Animal Tales From Rajasthan		1983
288	667	Bikal the Terrible	The Tale of a Frightened Tiger		1983
289	816	The Elusive Kaka	Adapted From the Kakana Kote, a Kannada Classic		1983
290	628	Ramana Maharshi	The Gentle Saint Of Tiruvannamalai		1983
291	797	The Prophecy	A Buddhist Tale from Tibet		1983
292	744	Chokha Mela	The Boy Who Heard God		1983
293	752	Beni Madho and Pir Ali	Heroes of 1857		1983
294	824	Durgesh Nandini	A Story by Bankim Chandra Chattopadhyay		1983
295	740	Guru Arjan	The Man Who Knew No Fear		1983
296	NA	Mahamati Prannath	Founder of the Pranami Sect		1983
297	798	The Lost Prince	A Tale of Treachery		1983
298	NA	Damaji Pant and Narhari	Two Devotees of Panduranga		1983
299	799	The Silent Teacher	The Prince Who Could Not Speak		1983
300	696	The Historic City Of Delhi	A Tale of Power and Passion		1983
301	689	Tripura	The Three Impregnable Cities of Maya		1984
302	776	Dhola & Maru	A Romance From Rajasthan		1984
303	NA	Senapati Bapat	The Story of a Freedom Fighter		1984
304	DG465	Dr. Kotnis in China	The Selfless Physician		1984
305	610	Ravana Humbled	An Arrogant King Finds New Friends		1984
306	DG466	Y. Subba Row	The Story of a Scientist		1984
307	783	The Bridegroom's Ring	Two Tales From Garhwal		1984
308	712	Andhaka	The Dark Lord Who Saw Light		1984
309	678	Veer Savarkar	He Fought For Human Dignity and Freedom		1984
310	SI	The True Conqueror	Buddhist Tales		1984
311	751	Kunwar Singh	His Age Was No Bar To His Passion For Freedom		1984
312	654	Tales of Balarama	Valiant Brother of Krishna		1984
313	818	Shantala	The Queen Who Loved Peace		1984
314	668	The Acrobat	A Collection of Buddhist Tales		1984
315	805	The Golden Sand	Folk Tales From Nepal		1984
316	767	The Parijata Tree	Other Tales of Krishna		1984
317	DG467	Annapati Suyya	Retold From Kalhana's Rajatarangini		1984
318	671	The Cowherd of Alawi	Gentle Lessons From Buddha		1984
319	669	Ashwini Kumars	Tales of Devotion From the Vedas		1984
320	NA	Chandrapeeda	Other Tales of Kashmir		1984
321	807	The Green Demon	A Collection of Sufi Tales		1984
322	730	Shrenik	Jain Tales of Astuteness and Insight		1984
323	648	Samudra Gupta	The Lute-Playing Conquerer		1984
324	695	Nahusha	He Became the King of Heaven		1984
325	699	Jagadis Chandra Bose	The Scientist Who Befriended Plants and Metals		1985
326	SI	Tales of Avvaiyar	A Poet-Saint of Tamil Nadu	^{J}	1985
327	745	Tapati	Daughter of the Sun God		1985
328	DG469	Rajbala	Stories From Sindh		1985
329	BS	Mahabharata 1	Veda Vyasa	^{H}	1985
330	754	Vidyut Chora	A Jain Tale		1985
331	BS	Mahabharata 2	Bheeshma's Vow	^{H}	1985
332	587	Birbal the Genius	Wit and Wisdom at Akbar's Court		1985
333	BS	Mahabharata 3	The Advent of the Kuru Princes	^{H}	1985
334	675	Mangal Pandey	He Fired the First Shot		1985
335	BS	Mahabharata 4	The Pandavas at Hastinapura	^{H}	1985
336	710	The Fearless Boy	Buddhist Tales of the Path to Happiness		1985
337	BS	Mahabharata 5	Enter Drona	^{H}	1985
338	690	The Legend Of Lalitaditya	The Warrior-Poet of Kashmir		1985
339	BS	Mahabharata 6	Enter Karna	^{H}	1985
340	SI	The Making of a Swordsman	Zen Tales from Japan		1985
341	BS	Mahabharata 7	The Conspiracy	^{H}	1985
342	625	Battle of Wits	Tales of the Bodhisattva Aushadha Kumar		1985
343	BS	Mahabharata 8	The Escape	^{H}	1985
344	728	Deshbandhu Chittaranjan Das	He Sacrificed His All For the Country		1985
345	BS	Mahabharata 9	The Birth of Ghatotkacha	^{H}	1985
346	813	Maarthaanda Varma	A Romantic Legend From Kerala		1985
347	BS	Mahabharata 10	The Pandavas at Ekachakrapura	^{H}	1985
348	SI	The March to Freedom 1	The Birth of the Indian National Congress		1986
349	BS	Mahabharata 11	Enter Draupadi	^{H}	1986
350	DG470	Guru Ravidas	A Story of Compassion and Generosity		1986
351	BS	Mahabharata 12	Draupadi's Swayamvara	^{H}	1986
352	821	The Adventures of Pratapan	An Adaptation of the First Tamil Novel		1986
353	BS	Mahabharata 13	The Pandavas Recalled to Hastinapura	^{H}	1986
354	747	Sea Route to India	In Quest of the Ultimate Destination		1986
355	BS	Mahabharata 14	Arjuna's 12-Year-Long Exile	^{H}	1986
356	786	The March to Freedom 2	A Nation Awakes		1986
357	BS	Mahabharata 15	A Hall for Yudhishthira	^{H}	1986
358	704	Jallianwala Bagh	Massacre of the Innocents		1986
359	BS	Mahabharata 16	The Pandavas Conquer the World	^{H}	1986
360	SI	The March to Freedom 3	The Saga of Indian Revolutionaries		1986
361	BS	Mahabharata 17	Yudhishthira's Rajsooya Yajna	^{H}	1986
362	672	The Priceless Gem	A Jataka Tale - Adventures of a Bodhisattva at Court		1986
363	BS	Mahabharata 18	Indraprastha Lost	^{H}	1986
364	855	Khudiram Bose			1986
365	BS	Mahabharata 19	The Pandavas in the Forest	^{H}	1986
366	DG471	Patali Putra	Tales from the Kathasaritsagara		1986
367	BS	Mahabharata 20	Arjuna's Quest for Weapons	^{H}	1986
368	DG472	The Nawab's Diwan	Other Tamil Tales		1986
369	BS	Mahabharata 21	Arjuna in Indraloka	^{H}	1986
370	SI	Raja Desing	Legendary Hero of Tamil Nadu	^{J}	1986
371	BS	Mahabharata 22	The Reunion	^{H}	1986
372	583	The Greedy Mother-in-Law	Panchatantra Tales That Counsel and Caution		1987
373	BS	Mahabharata 23	Duryodhana Humbled	^{H}	1987
374	SI	Hamsavali	Pictorial Classics For Young and Old	^{G}	1987
375	BS	Mahabharata 24	The Twelfth Year	^{H}	1987
376	DG474	Lila & Chanesar	A Legend From Sindh	^{G}	1987
377	BS	Mahabharata 25	The Pandavas at Virata's Place	^{H}	1987
378	SI	Shringabuja	Tales from the Kathasaritsagara	^{G}	1987
379	BS	Mahabharata 26	Panic in the Kaurava Camp	^{H}	1987
380	SI	Padmavati	A Tale from Vetala Panchavimshati	^{G}^{J}	1987
381	BS	Mahabharata 27	Sanjaya's Mission	^{H}	1987
382	733	Ghanshyam Das Birla	A Builder of Modern India		1987
383	BS	Mahabharata 28	Duryodhana Refuses to Yield	^{H}	1987
384	722	Megasthenes	Ambassador, Traveler, and Observer		1987
385	BS	Mahabharata 29	Krishna's Peace Mission	^{H}	1987
386	680	Fa Hien	The Fearless Monk		1987
387	BS	Mahabharata 30	The War Begins	^{H}	1987
388	NA	Sundarasena	Tales from the Kathasaritsagara	^{G}	1987
389	BS	Mahabharata 31	Bheeshma in Command	^{H}	1987
390	691	Hiuen Tsang	A Buddhist Pilgrim From China		1987
391	BS	Mahabharata 32	The Fall of Bheeshma	^{H}	1987
392	649	Tales from the Upanishads	Tales of Peace and Wisdom		1987
393	BS	Mahabharata 33	Drona's Vow	^{H}	1987
394	DG475	Pulakeshi II	The King Who Defeated Emperor Harsha		1987
395	BS	Mahabharata 34	The Slaying of Abhimanyu	^{H}	1987
396	731	Ellora Caves	The Glory of the Rashtrakootas		1988
397	BS	Mahabharata 35	Arjuna Fulfils His Vow	^{H}	1988
398	793	Chennamma of Keladi	The Queen Who Defied Aurangazeb		1988
399	BS	Mahabharata 36	The Battle at Midnight	^{H}	1988
400	665	The Deadly Feast	Jataka Tales - Wisdom Conquers All		1988
401	660	Ajatashatru	A Son's Story of Sorrow and Success		1988
402	BS	Mahabharata 37	Karna in Command	^{H}	1988
403	792	Narayana Guru	He Believed in One Human Race		1988
404	BS	Mahabharata 38	The Kurus Routed	^{H}	1988
405	819	Prince Jivaka	From the Epic Tamil Poem, Jivaka Chintamani		1988
406	BS	Mahabharata 39	After the War	^{H}	1988
407	SI	Kohinoor			1988
408	BS	Mahabharata 40	Yudhishthira's Coronation	^{H}	1988
409	BS	Mahabharata 41	The Ashwamedha Yajna	^{H}	1989
410	780	Kanwal and Kehar	A Romantic Tale From Gujarat		1989
411	BS	Mahabharata 42	The Celestial Reunion	^{H}	1989
412	756	Roopmati	The Tragic Story of a Rajput Princess	^{G}	1989
413	BS	Bhagawat Purana 1	The Darling of Gokul	^{I}	1989
414	650	Mahatma Gandhi 1	The Early Days	^{E}	1989
415	BS	Bhagawat Purana 2	The Subduer of Kaliya	^{I}	1989
416	SI	Mahatma Gandhi 2	The Father of the Nation	^{E}	1989
417	BS	Bhagawat Purana 3	The Upholder of Govardhan	^{I}	1989
418	DG476	The French Revolution	Of Liberty, Equality, and Fraternity		1989
419	BS	Bhagawat Purana 4	Victory over Kamsa	^{I}	1989
420	580	The Inimitable Birbal	Friend, Philosopher, and Guide to Akbar		1989
421	BS	Bhagawat Purana 5	The Lord of Dwaraka	^{I}	1990
422	NA	Louis Pasteur			1990
423	BS	Bhagawat Purana 6	The Enchanter	^{I}	1990
424	806	The Clever Dancer	A Battle of Wits	^{G}	1990
425	BS	Bhagawat Purana 7	The Victorious	^{I}	1990
426	614	True Friends	Jataka Tales of Good Conduct		1990
427	BS	Bhagawat Purana 8	An Ally of the Pandavas	^{I}	1990
428	NA	Napoleon Bonaparte			1990
429	BS	Bhagawat Purana 9	The Saviour	^{I}	1990
430	SI	An Exciting Find			1990
431	615	Stories of Courage	Jataka Tales of Valour and Victory		1990
432	SI	The Indus Valley Adventure	The Route to the Roots		1990
433	602	The Quick Witted Birbal			1991
434	SI	The Chosen Bridegroom	Tales from the Kathasaritsagara		1991
435	778	Pierre & Marie Curie	They Shared a Passion for Science		1991
436	700	Jawaharlal Nehru	The Early Days		1991
NA	679	Swami Pranavananda	He Symbolised the Strength of Spirituality	^{F}^{K}	1998
NA	732	Swami Chinmayananda	Modern Life Meets Ancient Wisdom	^{K}	2001
NA	735	JRD Tata	The Quiet Conquerer	^{K}	2004
NA	736	Kalpana Chawla	The First Indian Woman In Space		2005
NA	737	Jamsetji Tata	The Man Who Saw Tomorrow	^{K}	2005
NA	800	Mother Teresa	Little Acts of Love		2010
NA	801	Tales of Ganesha		^{B}	2010
NA	825	Surjya Sen	The Chittagong Uprising		2010
NA	826	Heroes of Hampi	The Mythology of Kishkindha		2011
NA	827	Tales of Indra	Lord of Thunder		2011
NA	828	Tirupati	The Lord of Tirumala		2011
NA	829	Vaishno Devi	Goddess of the Hills		2011
NA	830	Ganesha And The Moon		^{B}	2011
NA	831	Tenzing Norgay	On Top of the World		2011
NA	832	Stories Of Creation	From the Brahma Purana		2011
NA	833	Konark	Temple to the Sun		2012
NA	834	Anant Pai	Master Storyteller	^{K}	2012
NA	835	Salim Ali	The Bird Man of India	^{K}	2012
NA	836	Thanjavur	City of Brihadeeswara		2012
NA	837	The Blue Umbrella	Stories by Ruskin Bond		2012
NA	838	Jim Corbett	Friend of the Wild		2012
NA	839	Kubera	The Lord of Wealth		2012
NA	840	Saraswati	Stories of the Goddess of Wisdom		2012
NA	841	M S Subbulakshmi	Queen of Carnatic Music		2012
NA	842	Srinivasa Ramanujan	Man of Mathematics		2012
NA	843	The Unhappy Tiger	Stories from the Hitopadesha		2013
NA	844	Amba	A Saga of Revenge		2013
NA	845	Verghese Kurien	The Man With the Billion Litre Idea		2013
NA	846	Two Oxen	Stories by Munshi Premchand		2014
NA	847	Jagjivan Ram	Crusader for Social Justice	^{D}^{F}^{K}	2017
NA	847	Paramahamsa Yogananda	A Saint for East and West	^{D}^{G}^{K}	2018
NA	848	Vikram Sarabhai	Pioneering India's Space Programme	^{C}	2020
NA	849	Manik Prabhu	A Rare Spiritual Gem	^{D}	2021
NA	849	A Couple of Misers	Stories from Around India	^{D}	2021
NA	850	Meherbai Tata	Champion of Women's Causes	^{F}^{K}	2021
NA	852	Lal Bahadur Shastri	Jai Jawan Jai Kisan	^{L}	2022
NA	854	Ardeshir and Pirojsha Godrej	Pioneers of Progress	^{K}	2022
NA	856	Naval Godrej	Pioneer of Progress	^{K}	2023
NA	857	Young Heroes of India		^{C}	2023
NA	858	A Day at the Museum		^{C}	2023
NA	859	Dorabji Tata	Industrialist, Philanthropist, Sportsman	^{F}	2023
NA	860	The Apollo Story	A Saga of Comfort and Healing	^{K}	2024
NA	861	The Ambuja Story	Cementing a Legacy	^{K}	2024
NA	862	Savitribai & Jyotirao Phule	Fighting Oppression With Education		2024
NA	870	Celestial Beings	Yakshas, Gandharvas, Apsaras		2024
NA	878	Lakshmi	The Goddess of Good Fortune		2024
NA	880	U.Ve.Sa	Saviour of Ancient Tamil Literature		2024
NA	881	Ancient Temples of India	A Pilgrimage to Sacred Shrines	^{C}	2025
NA	882	The Legend of Lohasura	Seven Stories from Tribal Mythology		2025
NA	883	The Decline of the Mughal Empire			2025
NA	884	Bhagavad Gita	Song of the Divine	^{L}	2025
NA	886	Kasturbhai Lalbhai	Weaving the Nation's Future		2025
NA	890	Musicians of India	Ragas and Rhythms		2026

The titles for the following issues are unknown: DG464, DG468, DG473, 851, 853, 863, 864, 865, 866, 867, 868, 869, 871, 872, 873, 874, 875, 876, 877, 879, 885, 887, 888, 889.

=== Unreleased Issues ===
The back covers of issues from early 1986 show that the March to Freedom Series originally had 6 volumes, but only the first 3 were released. This is speculated to be due to conflicts over content. Parts 4 and 5 were titled 364 - The Call for Swaraj and 368 - The Salt Satyagraha, and were modified and released in 1989 as the 2 issues about Mahatma Gandhi (414 and 416). Part 6 was titled 372 - The Tryst With Destiny, and has never been released.

The 1994 fire at the IBH offices destroyed the artwork for several unreleased issues.

Several issues have been initially produced only for internal distribution at various institutions (see note F below). Some of these were later made available for sale to the general public.

Some issues from the old numbering system have never been re-released in either the new system or as part of specials and box sets. These have been out of print since the early 1990s.

Key
Note	Description
NA	Not Available in that series
BS	Published as part of a Box Set
SI	Published as part of a Special Issue or compilation
DG	Digital re-release of a print comic
Title	Short story collection
^A	Western fairy tales published only in Indian languages
^B	Issue 801 - Tales Of Ganesha was later released as 830 - Ganesha and the Moon
^C	Collaboration with government agencies like the Ministry of Culture and ISRO
^D	Conflicting catalog numbers
^E	Originally parts 4 and 5 of the March To Freedom Series
^F	Initially for internal distribution only. Later made available to the general public.
^G	Previously released by Chaturang Katha
^H	Currently available only as part of the Mahabharata box set
^I	Currently available only as part of the Bhagawat - The Krishna Avatar box set
^J	Released in monochrome in The Lost Collection special
^K	Collaboration with a corporation or charitable entity
^L	These Issues have duplicate titles, but are different comics

== List of Bumper Issues ==
The Bumper Issues were Amar Chitra Katha's first specials. They were compilations of 3 issues, and many were subsequently released in other special series. The catalog numbers in the 1970s had conflicts, with some numbers reused.

Number	Title	Year	Included Issues
1	Tales of Hanuman		Hanuman, Hanuman to the Rescue, Bheema and Hanuman
2	Tales of Birbal		Birbal the Wise, Birbal the Witty, Birbal the Clever
3	Tales from the Panchatantra		The Jackal and the War Drum, The Brahmin and the Goat, How the Jackal Ate the Elephant
4	Tales of Buddha		Bird Stories, Buddha, Angulimala
5	Tales of the Mother Goddess		Shiva and Sati, Shiva and Parvati, Tales of Durga
6	The Sons of Shiva		Ganesha, Kartikeya, Ayyappan
7	Adventures of Krishna		Krishna and the False Vasudeva, Krishna and Narakasura, Krishna and Shishupala
8	Tales from the Hitopdesha		Choice of Friends, How Friends Are Parted, The Tiger and the Woodpecker
9	The Great Ranas of Mewar		Rana Kumbha, Rana Pratap, Rana Sangha
10	Tales of Humour		Raman of Tenali, Raman the Matchless Wit, Gopal the Jester
11	The Sons of the Pandavas		Abhimanyu, Ghatotkacha, Bhabiruvahana
12	Devotees of Vishnu		Dhruva and Ashtavakra, Prahalad, Chandrahasa
13	Animal Stories		Monkey Stories, Deer Stories, Elephant Stories
14	Poet-Saints of North India		
15	Ramakrishna Paramhamsa and His Tales		Gopal and the Cowherd, The Pandit and the Milkmaid, The Learned Pandit
16	Tales from the Mahabharata		The Golden Mongoose, Friends and Foes, Aruni and Uttanka
17	Tales of Gujarat		
18	Valiant Kings of Ancient India		
19	Folktales of Bengal		
20	Heroes of the Mahabharata		Bheeshma, Drona, Karna
21	The Three Gurus		Guru Nanak, Guru Tegh Bahadur, Guru Gobind Singh
22	Tales of Revolutionaries		
23	Men Who Fought For Independence		
24	Great Sons of Bengal		
25	Tales of Valiant Queens		
26	Tales of Krishna		
27	Tales of Love and Devotion		Savitri, Nala Damayanti, Shakuntala
28	Exploits of Arjuna		
29	Tales of Indra		Tales of Indra, Indra and Shibi, Indra and Shachi
30	The Rightful King and Other Stories		Jackal Stories, The Hidden Treasure, True Friends
31	The Great Mughals I		
32	The Great Mughals II		
33	Heroes of Punjab		
34	Tales of Sanjeevani		
35	Legends of Orissa		
36	Buddhist Legends		The Magic Chant, King Kusha, Nandivishala
The above list is taken from the most recently published Bumper Issue. The following issues only appear on older lists.
9	More Tales from the Panchatantra		
10	The Story Of The Freedom Struggle		The Birth of the Indian National Congress, A Nation Awakes, The Saga of Indian Revolutionaries, The Early Days, The Father of the Nation
14	More Tales of Birbal		
17	Stories of Wisdom		
18	Stories of Wit		

== List of 3-in-1 Special Issues ==
The 3-in-1 specials are deluxe hardcover issues use the 100XX numbering scheme. The first 3 are extra-long issues with fresh content. The rest are compilations of 3 existing issues. Some of these are reprinted Bumper Issues.

3-in-1 specials
Number	Title	Year	Included Issues
10001	Valmiki's Ramayana	1978	
10002	Dashavatar	1978	
10003	Jesus Christ	1980	
10004	Tales from the Panchatantra	2008	How the Jackal Ate the Elephant, The Jackal and the War Drum, The Brahmin and the Goat
10005	Tales from the Jatakas	1999	Elephant Stories, Monkey Stories, Deer Stories
10006	Tales of Hanuman	1994	Hanuman, Hanuman to the Rescue, Bheema and Hanuman
10007	Tales of Birbal	1999	Birbal the Wise, Birbal the Clever, Birbal to the Rescue
10008	More Tales of Birbal	1999	Birbal the Genius, Birbal the Witty, Birbal the Just
10009	Tales of Krishna	1999	Krishna and Rukmini, Krishna, The Syamantaka Gem
10010	Great Plays of Kalidasa	1999	Urvashi, Shakuntala, Malavika
10011	Great Sanskrit Plays	1999	Ratnavali, Udayana, Vasantsena
10012	Great Indian Emperors	1999	Ashoka, Samudra Gupta, Harsha
10013	Vishnu the Saviour	1997	Dhruva and Ashtavakra, Tales of Vishnu, Tales of Narada
10014	Ranas of Mewar	1999	Rana Kumbha, Rana Pratap, Rana Sangha
10015	Tales from the Hitopadesha	1999	Choice of Friends, How Friends are Parted, A Bag of Gold Coins
10016	Matchless Wits	1999	Gopal the Jester, Raman of Tenali, Raman and the Matchless Wit
10017	More Tales from the Jatakas	2000	Deadly Feast, Hidden Treasure, Battle of Wits
10018	Adventures of Krishna	2000	Krishna and Narakasura, Krishna and Jarasandha, Krishna and the False Vaasudeva
10019	Tales of the Mother Goddess	2000	Tales of Durga, Sati and Shiva, Shiva Parvati
10020	Vishnu to the Rescue	2000	Garuda, Prahlad, The Churning of the Ocean
10021	More Tales From The Panchatantra	2000	Crows and Owls, The Dullard, The Greedy Mother-in-law
10022	Buddhist Tales	2000	Buddha, Angulimala, Amrapali and Upagupta
10023	More Buddhist Tales	2000	King Kusha, Vasavadatta, The Acrobat
10024	The Sons of Shiva	2000	Ayyapan, Ganesha, Kartikeya
10025	Tales told by Sri Ramakrishna	2000	Gopal and the Cowherd, The Pandit and the Milkmaid, The Learned Pandit
10026	Further Stories From The Jatakas	2008	Nandivishala, The Deadly Feast, The Battle of Wits, True Friends, The Hidden Treasure
10027	The Sons of the Pandavas	2008	Abhimanyu, Ghatotkach, Uloopi
10028	Bengali Classics	2008	Anand Math, Devi Choudhurani, Kapala Kundala
10029	The Three Gurus	1999	Guru Nanak, Guru Tegh Bahadur, Guru Gobind Singh
10030	Funny Folk Tales	2008	The Adventures of Baddu and Chhotu, Bikal the Terrible, The Tiger-Eater
10031	Yet More Tales From The Jatakas	2001	Nandivishala, Jackal Stories, Bird Stories
10032	The Great Hindi Poets	2001	Tulsidas, Soordas, Mirabai
10033	Shivaji - The Great Maratha	2001	Shivaji, Tales of Shivaji, Tanaji
10034	Tales of Love and Devotion	2011	Harishchandra, Savitri, Kannagi
10035	Travellers to India	2009	Megasthenes, Fa Hien, Hiuen Tsang
10036	Tales of Devotion	2011	Chokha Mela, Mirabai, Shankar Dev
10037	Architects of Modern India	2011	Jamsetji Tata, GD Birla, JRD Tata
10038	Heroes to be Remembered	2010	Paurava and Alexander, Baladitya and Yashodharma, Hemu
10039	Animal Tales of India	2011	The Pious Cat, The Pig and the Dog, Friends and Foes
10040	Maratha Bravehearts	2010	Sambhaji, Baji Rao 1, Ahilyabai Holkar
10041	Valiant Sikhs	2010	Ranjit Singh, Hari Singh Nalwa, Bidhi Chand
10042	Tales from the Desert	2010	Hothal, Dhola and Maru, Kanwal and Kehar
10043	Famous Scientists	2010	Jagdis Chandra Bose, Albert Einstein, Marie and Pierre Curie
10044	The Prophecy and Other Stories	2010	The Prophecy, The Lost Prince, The Silent Teacher
10045	The Green Demon and Other Stories	2013	The Green Demon, The Secret of the Talking Bird, The Mystery of the Missing Gifts
10046	Tales of Valour	2010	Satwant Kaur, Sundari, Sharan Kaur
10047	Tales from Bengal	2010	Chandralalat, Adventures of Baddu and Chhotu, Sukhu and Dukhu
10048	Famous Queens	2011	Rani Abbaka, Shantala, Chand Bibi
10049	Young Revolutionaries	2011	Surja Sen, Bhagat Singh, Bagh Jatin
10050	The Mughal Court	2011	Noor Jahan, Kohinoor, Dara Shikoh and Aurangzeb
10051	Tales from the Puranas	2011	Surya, The Syamantaka Gem, Prince Hritadhwaja
10052	Stories in Stone	2011	Elephanta, Ellora Caves, The Historic City of Delhi
10053	Champions of Change	2012	Ishwar Chandra Vidyasagar, Babasaheb Ambedkar, Rabindranath Tagore
10054	Clever Ministers	2012	Chanakya, Velu Thampi, Baji Rao I
10055	Powerful Rishis	2012	Vishwamitra, Agastya, Parashurama
10056	Temples of India	2012	Tirupati, Vaishno Devi, Konark
10057	Poet Saints of India	2012	Tukaram, Tyagaraja, Narsinh Mehta

== List of 5-in-1 Special Issues ==
The 5-in-1 specials are numbered 10XX, and are mass-market paperback compilations.

5-In-1 Specials
Number	Title	Year	Included Issues
1001	Stories of Krishna	2008	Krishna, Krishna and Rukmini, The Symantaka Gem, Krishna and Jarasandha, Krishna and Narakasura
1002	Stories of Birbal	2008	Birbal the Clever, Birbal the Genius, Birbal the Wise, Birbal to the Rescue, the Inimitable Birbal
1003	Stories from the Jatakas	2021	Bird Stories, Monkey Stories, Deer Stories, Elephant Stories, Jackal Stories
1004	Stories from the Panchatantra	2008	The Jackal and the War Drum, The Brahmin and the Goat, Crows and Owls, How the Jackal Ate the Elephant, The Dullard
1005	Stories of Rama	2004	Ancestors of Rama, Dasharatha, Rama, Hanuman, The Sons of Rama
1006	Tales of Humour	2008	Raman of Tenali, Raman the Matchless Wit, Birbal the Just, Birbal the Witty, Gopal the Jester
1007	More Stories from the Jatakas	2008	The Mouse Merchant, The Giant and the Dwarf, The Magic Chant, The Priceless Gem, Tales of Misers
1008	Stories of Shiva	1972	Sati and Shiva, Shiva Parvati, Tales of Shiva, Ganesha, Kartikeya
1009	Devotees of Vishnu	1998	The Churning of the Ocean, Tales of Vishnu, Tales of Narada, Prahlad, Dhruva and Ashtavakra
1010	Heroes from the Mahabharata	2008	Bheeshma, Drona, Tales of Arjuna, Karna, Abhimanyu
1011	Stories from Sanskrit Drama	2008	Shakuntala, Urvashi, Udayana, Vasantasena, Ratnavali
1012	Great Rulers of India	2008	Krishnadeva Raya, Ashoka, Chandragupta Maurya, Samudra Gupta, Harsha
1013	Brave Rajputs	1972	Prithviraj Chauhan, Rana Kumbha, Rana Sanga, Rana Pratap, Rani Durgavati
1014	Ancient Tales of Wit and Wisdom	2008	A Bag of Gold Coins, Choice of Friends, How Friends are Parted, The Tiger and the Woodpecker, Friends and Foes
1015	Further Stories from the Jatakas	2008	Nandivishala, The Deadly Feast, The Battle of Wits, True Friends, The Hidden Treasure
1016	Stories from the Bhagwat	2008	Krishna and the False Vasudeva, Sudama, Aniruddha, Krishna and Shishupala, Tales of Balarama
1017	Buddhist Stories	2008	Buddha, King Kusha, Angulimala, Amrapali, The Acrobat and Other Buddhist Tales
1018	Stories from The Mahabharata	2003	Indra and Shibi, Nala Damayanti, Kacha and Devayani, Indra and Shachi, Savitri
1019	Great Freedom Fighters	2008	Lokamanya Tilak, Mahatma Gandhi, Veer Savarkar, Subhas Chandra Bose, Bhagat Singh
1020	Brave Women of India	2008	Rani of Jhansi, The Rani of Kittur, Rani Abbakka, Sultana Razia, Kalpana Chawla
1021	Famous Sikh Gurus	2009	Guru Nanak, Guru Arjan, Guru Har Gobind, Guru Tegh Bahadur, Guru Gobind Singh
1022	Tales of Revolutionaries	2011	Chandra Shekhar Azad, Bagha Jatin, Deshbandhu Chittranjan Das, Rash Behari Bose, A Nation Awakens
1023	Jain Stories	2011	Vidyut Chora, The Magic Grove, The Adventures of Agad Datta, Sahasramalla, The King in a Parrot's Body
1024	Regional Folk Tales of India	2011	Sakshi Gopal, Jasma of the Odes, The Bridegroom's Ring, Thugsen, The Rainbow Prince
1025	Stories about Freedom Fighters	2011	Rabindranath Tagore, Mahatma Gandhi, Jayaprakash Narayan, Babasaheb Ambedkar, Jawaharlal Nehru
1026	Tales of Giants and Demons	2011	The Lord of Lanka, Ravana Humbled, Mahiravana, Kumbhakarna, Ghatotkacha
1027	Poets and Thinkers	2011	Kabir, Mirabai, Ekanath, Soordas, Narayana Guru
1028	Bravehearts of the South	2011	Tachcholi Othenan, Chenamma of Keladi, Kochunni, Hakka and Bukka, Rani Abbakka
1029	Andher Nagari and Other Stories	2011	Andher Nagari, Manduka, The Miraculous Conch, The Golden Sand, The Clever Dancer
1030	Warriors for Freedom	2011	The Rani of Kittur, Rani of Jhansi, Tipu Sultan, Velu Thampi, Kunwar Singh
1031	The Great Mughals	2011	Babur, Humayun, Akbar, Jahangir, Shah Jahan
1032	Tamil Classics	2010	Prince Jivaka, Kannagi, Kumanan, The Adventures of Pratapan, Manonmani
1033	Classics by Bankim Chandra Chatterjee	2011	Kapala Kundala, Raj Singh, Devi Choudhurani, Ananda Math, Durgesh Nandini
1034	The Kuru Clan	2008	Gandhari, Tales of Yudhishtira, Draupadi, Jayadratha, Pareekshit
1035	Stories from the Kathasaritasagara	2011	The Chosen Bridegroom, Hamsavali, Shridatta, Shringabhuja, Pataliputra
1036	Kadambari & Other Ancient Classics	2012	Kadambari, Nagananda, Malati and Madhava, Malavika, Raja Bhoja
1037	The Fearless Boy & Other Buddhist Stories	2012	The Fearless Boy, The Cowherd of Alawi, The True Conqueror, The Lost Prince, The Making of a Swordsman
1038	Ancient Kings of India	2012	Bimbisara, Ajatashatru, King Shalivahana, Vikramaditya, The Legend of Lalitaditya

== List of Collected Specials ==
Some special series cover extended epics or a set of thematically linked stories. They use their own numbering schemes. Some of them have been released as box sets or single special issues.

Collected Specials
Set Title	Number	Issue Title	Included Issues	Year	Notes
Mahabharata	1	The Kuru Princes of Hastinapura	Veda Vyasa, Bheeshma's Vow, The Advent of the Kuru Princes, The Pandavas at Hastinapura, Enter Drona, Enter Karna, The Conspiracy, The Escape, The Birth of Ghatotkacha, The Pandavas at Ekachakra, Enter Draupadi, Draupadi's Swayamvara, The Pandavas Recalled to Hastinapura, Arjuna's 12-Year-Long Exile	2006	Compilations of 42 Mahabharata issues Also released as a box set
Mahabharata	2	The Pandavas in Exile	A Hall for Yudhishthira, The Pandavas Conquer the World, Yudhishthira's Rajsooya Yajna, Indraprastha Lost, The Pandavas in the Forest, Arjuna's Quest for Weapons, Arjuna in Indraloka, The Reunion, Duryodhana Humbled, The Twelfth Year, The Pandavas at Virata's Place, Panic in the Kaurava Camp, Sanjaya's Mission, Duryodhana Refuses to Yield	2006	Compilations of 42 Mahabharata issues Also released as a box set
Mahabharata	3	On the Battlefield of Kurukshetra	Krishna's Peace Mission, The War Begins, Bheeshma in Command, The Fall of Bheeshma, Drona's Vow, The Slaying of Abhimanyu, Arjuna Fulfils His Vow, The Battle at Midnight, Karna in Command, The Kurus Routed, After the War, Yudhishthira's Coronation, The Ashwamedha Yajna, The Celestial Reunion	2006	Compilations of 42 Mahabharata issues Also released as a box set
Tulsidas' Ramayana	1	The Childhood Days of Ram		2007	Originally titled Ram Charit Manas Also released as a box set
Tulsidas' Ramayana	2	Ram in Exile		2007	Originally titled Ram Charit Manas Also released as a box set
Tulsidas' Ramayana	3	The Abduction of Sita		2007	Originally titled Ram Charit Manas Also released as a box set
Tulsidas' Ramayana	4	In Search of Sita		2007	Originally titled Ram Charit Manas Also released as a box set
Tulsidas' Ramayana	5	Ram the Victorious		2007	Originally titled Ram Charit Manas Also released as a box set
Legendary Rulers of India	1	Brave Queens	Sultana Razia, Rani of Jhansi, Rani Abbakka	2010	15 issues in 5 volumes Also released as a box set and a single special issue
Legendary Rulers of India	2	Warrior Kings	Shivaji, Tipu Sultan, Rana Pratap	2010	15 issues in 5 volumes Also released as a box set and a single special issue
Legendary Rulers of India	3	Conquerors	Raja Raja Chola, The Legend of Lalitaditya	2010	15 issues in 5 volumes Also released as a box set and a single special issue
Legendary Rulers of India	4	Visionary Kings	Ranjit Singh, Shah Jahan, Ashoka	2010	15 issues in 5 volumes Also released as a box set and a single special issue
Legendary Rulers of India	5	Administrators	Akbar, Ahilya Bai Holkar, Krishnadeva Raya	2010	15 issues in 5 volumes Also released as a box set and a single special issue
India's Wittiest and Wisest	1	Volume 1	The Brahmin and the Goat, Birbal the Witty, The Jackal and the War Drum, Elephant Stories, Choice of Friends, The Mouse Merchant, The Fearless Boy, The Adventures of Baddu and Chottu, Kesari the Flying Thief, Raman the Matchless Wit, Birbal the Clever, Friends and Foes, Gopal the Jester, The Learned Pandit, Bikal the Terrible	2012	30 issues in 2 volumes Collaboration with Reader's Digest
India's Wittiest and Wisest	2	Volume 2	Raman of Tenali, Gopal and the Cowherd, King Kusha, The Priceles Gem, The Queen's Necklace, The Prince and the Magician, Vidyut Chora, The Pig and The Dog, The Bridegroom's Ring, The Secret of the Talking Bird, Sukhu and Dukhu, The Rainbow Prince, The Silent Teacher, The Golden Sand, The Clever Dancer	2012	30 issues in 2 volumes Collaboration with Reader's Digest
Valmiki's Ramayana	1	Bala Kand		2013	Also released as a box set Vol. 6 includes Uttara Kand
Valmiki's Ramayana	2	Ayodhya Kand		2014	Also released as a box set Vol. 6 includes Uttara Kand
Valmiki's Ramayana	3	Aranya Kand		2016	Also released as a box set Vol. 6 includes Uttara Kand
Valmiki's Ramayana	4	Kishkindha Kand		2018	Also released as a box set Vol. 6 includes Uttara Kand
Valmiki's Ramayana	5	Sundara Kand		2018	Also released as a box set Vol. 6 includes Uttara Kand
Valmiki's Ramayana	6	Yuddha Kand		2018	Also released as a box set Vol. 6 includes Uttara Kand
Tales from the Puranas	1	Volume 1	Bheema and Hanuman, Hanuman, Tales of Marayada Rama	2016	9 issues in 3 volumes
Tales from the Puranas	2	Volume 2	The Gita, Krishna, Krishna and Jarasandha	2016	9 issues in 3 volumes
Tales from the Puranas	3	Volume 3	Shiva Parvati, Ganesha, Karttikeya	2016	9 issues in 3 volumes
Mahadeva	1	In the Beginning		2020	Also released as a box set
Mahadeva	2	Shiva and Shakti		2020	Also released as a box set
Mahadeva	3	Kartikeya and Ganesha		2020	Also released as a box set
Mahadeva	4	The Jyotirlingas		2020	Also released as a box set
Mahadeva	5	Shiva the Saviour		2020	Also released as a box set
Mahadeva	6	Moksha		2020	Also released as a box set
The Naval Journey of India	1	Millennia of Sea Travels		2020	Also released as a box set Collaboration with the Indian Navy
The Naval Journey of India	2	Tacking to the Blue Waters		2020	Also released as a box set Collaboration with the Indian Navy
The Naval Journey of India	3	Tales of Glory		2020	Also released as a box set Collaboration with the Indian Navy
Valiant Women of India	1	Volume 1	Aruna Asif Ali	2021	Also released as a special
Valiant Women of India	2	Volume 2	Jhalkari Bai, Durgabai Deshmukh	2021	Also released as a special
Valiant Women of India	3	Volume 3	Vijaya Lakshmi Pandit, Kankalata Barua	2021	Also released as a special
Valiant Women of India	4	Volume 4	Sarojini Naidu, Usha Mehta	2021	Also released as a special
Tales of Birbal	1	Volume 1	The Inimitable Birbal, Birbal the Wise, Birbal the Genius	2021	8 issues in 3 volumes
Tales of Birbal	2	Volume 2	Birbal the Just, Birbal the Witty, Birbal to the Rescue	2021	8 issues in 3 volumes
Tales of Birbal	3	Volume 3	Birbal the Clever, Leave it to Birbal	2021	8 issues in 3 volumes
Professor Ayushman	1	Ayurveda		2021	Collaboration with the Ministry of Ayush and the National Medicinal Plant Board
Professor Ayushman	2	Fighting COVID		2022	Collaboration with the Ministry of Ayush and the National Medicinal Plant Board
Professor Ayushman	3	Ayushman Returns		2022	Collaboration with the Ministry of Ayush and the National Medicinal Plant Board
Professor Ayushman	4	Yoga Special		2024	Collaboration with the Ministry of Ayush and the National Medicinal Plant Board
Stories from the Mahabharata	1	Hidden Gems	Savitri, Nala Damayanti, Uloopi, Sukanya, Friends and Foes	2022	
Jain and Buddhist Stories	1	Volume 1	Kesari the Flying Thief, The Celestial Necklace, The Adventures of Agad Datta, Amrapali, The Prophecy, The Lost Prince	2022	12 issues in 2 volumes
Jain and Buddhist Stories	2	Volume 2	Shrenik, Sahasramalla, The Silent Teacher, The Acrobat, The Cowherd of Alawi, The Fearless Boy	2022	12 issues in 2 volumes
Makers of Modern India	1	Volume 1	Sardar Patel, Babasaheb Ambedkar, Anasuya Sarabhai, Ghanshyam Das Birla, Rukhmabai	2023	
Mann Ki Baat	1	Mann Ki Baat Vol. 01		2023	Stories from the Mann Ki Baat radio programme Collaboration with the Ministry of Culture
Mann Ki Baat	2	Mann Ki Baat Vol. 02		2023	Stories from the Mann Ki Baat radio programme Collaboration with the Ministry of Culture
Mann Ki Baat	3	Mann Ki Baat Vol. 03		2023	Stories from the Mann Ki Baat radio programme Collaboration with the Ministry of Culture
Mann Ki Baat	4	Mann Ki Baat Vol. 04		2023	Stories from the Mann Ki Baat radio programme Collaboration with the Ministry of Culture
Mann Ki Baat	5	Mann Ki Baat Vol. 05		2023	Stories from the Mann Ki Baat radio programme Collaboration with the Ministry of Culture
Mann Ki Baat	6	Mann Ki Baat Vol. 06		2023	Stories from the Mann Ki Baat radio programme Collaboration with the Ministry of Culture
Mann Ki Baat	7	Mann Ki Baat Vol. 07		2023	Stories from the Mann Ki Baat radio programme Collaboration with the Ministry of Culture
Mann Ki Baat	8	Mann Ki Baat Vol. 08		2023	Stories from the Mann Ki Baat radio programme Collaboration with the Ministry of Culture
Mann Ki Baat	9	Mann Ki Baat Vol. 09		2024	Stories from the Mann Ki Baat radio programme Collaboration with the Ministry of Culture
Mann Ki Baat	10	Mann Ki Baat Vol. 10		2024	Stories from the Mann Ki Baat radio programme Collaboration with the Ministry of Culture
Mann Ki Baat	11	Mann Ki Baat Vol. 11		2024	Stories from the Mann Ki Baat radio programme Collaboration with the Ministry of Culture
Mann Ki Baat	12	Mann Ki Baat Vol. 12		2024	Stories from the Mann Ki Baat radio programme Collaboration with the Ministry of Culture
The Consumers' Journey	1	Toy Trouble		2025	Collaboration with the Department of Consumer Affairs and Tinkle
The Consumers' Journey	2	Review the Reviews		2025	Collaboration with the Department of Consumer Affairs and Tinkle

== List of Timeless 10 Editions ==
Timeless 10 Editions are premium hardcover compilations of 10 issues.

Timeless 10 Editions
Number	Title	Year	Included Issues
T10-1	Call of the Flute	2023	Krishna, Mirabai, Krishna And Rukmini, Krishna And Narakasura, Sudama, Krishna And The False Vasudeva, Tales Of Balarama, The Gita, Krishna And Jarasandha, Krishna And Shishupala
T10-2	Epic Stories	2023	The Pandava Princes, Karna, Agastya, Parashurama, Drona, Harishchandra, Kumbhakarna, Tales of Yudhishthira, The Golden Mongoose, Savitri
T10-3	History Collection	2010	Hiuen Tsang, Shah Jahan, Raja Raja Chola, Ashoka, Rani of Jhansi, The Legend of Lalit Aditya, Rana Sanga, Akbar, Bajirao I, The Historic City of Delhi
T10-4	The World of Ganesha	2011	Ganesha, Shiva Parvati, Andhaka, Tripura, Elephanta, Sati and Shiva, Tales of Shiva, Ganesha and The Moon, Nahusha, Kartikeya
T10-5	Jataka Collection	2012	Monkey Stories, Elephant Stories, Deer Stories, The Jackal And The War Drum, The Mouse Merchant, Stories Of Wisdom, Shrenik, The Hidden Treasure, The Pious Cat, The Pig and the Dog, Friends and Foes
T10-6	Famous Wits of India	2012	Birbal the Genius, Gopal the Jester, Birbal the Just, Birbal the Clever, The Inimitable Birbal, Birbal the Witty, Birbal to the Rescue, Raman the Matchless Wit, Raman of Tenali, Birbal the Wise
T10-7	The Buddhist Collection	2025	Buddha, The Cowherd of Alawi, The Fearless Boy, Amrapali, Nagananda, King Kusha, Angulimala, The Acrobat, Nandivishala, The Acrobat

== List of Other Special Issues ==
Amar Chitra Katha sometimes released special issues with no numbering. This became the standard for specials released from the 2010s onwards, which may be either fresh content or compilations.

Other Special Issues
Title	Year	Included Issues	Notes
Astronomy and Space	1983		17 stories of The Moon (Our Strange Neighbor), The Race to the Moon, The Sun, Our Solar System, Mercury, Venus, Mars, Asteroids, Jupiter, Saturn, Uranus, Neptune, Pluto, Meteors and Meteorites, Comets, Comet Halley, Black Holes, The Saga of Spaceships, and The Saga of Indian Spaceships
Bhagawat - The Krishna Avatar	2000	The Darling of Gokul, The Subduer of Kaliya, The Upholder of Govardhan, Victory Over Kamsa, The Lord of Dwaraka, The Enchanter, The Victorious, An Ally of the Pandavas, The Saviour	9 odd numbered issues from 413 to 429
Divine Beings	2004		6 stories of Jatayu, Nandi, Shyama and Sabala, Airavata, and Gandaberunda and Sharabha
Mahatma Gandhi	2009	Mahatma Gandhi - The Early Days, Mahatma Gandhi - The Father of the Nation	2 issues
Devotees and Demons	2010	Hanuman, Ghatotkacha, Garuda, Sudama, The Lord Of Lanka, Jagannatha Of Puri, Mahiravana, Kaccha And Devyani, Vishwamitra, Dhruva And Ashtavakra, Tripura	11 issues
Gods and Goddesses	2010	Ashini Kumars, Ayyappan, Churning of the Ocean, Ganesha, Indra and Shachi, Indra and Shibi, Karttikeya, Krishna, Krishna and Rukmini, Krishna and Shishupala, Krishna and Jarasandha, Parijata Tree, Parshurama, Tales of Balarama, Rama, Sati and Shiva, Shiva and Parvati, Surya, Syamantaka Gem, Tales of Durga, Tales of Shiva, Tales of Vishnu	22 issues Numbered EM-1 Also released as a box set
Legendary Rulers of India	2010	Sultana Razia, Rani of Jhansi, Rani Abbakka, Shivaji, Tipu Sultan, Rana Pratap, Raja Raja Chola, The Legend of Lalitaditya, Ranjit Singh, Shah Jahan, Ashoka, Akbar, Ahilya Bai Holkar, Krishnadeva Raya	15 issues Also released as a 5-issue box set and as a single speciai issue
Great Indian Classics	2011	Shakuntala, Malavika, Urvashi, Udayana, Ratnavali, Vasantasena, Nagananda, Bankim Chandra, Devi Choudhurani, Ananda Math, Raj Singh, Kapala Kundala, Kannagi, Manonmani, Prince Jivaka, Kumanan, Satwant Kaur, Veer Dhaval, The Elusive Kaka, The Taming of Gulla, The Legend of Marthanda Varma	20 issues Published in a double-width format Also released as a box set
Ancient Kings of India	2012	Bimbisara, Ajatashatru, King Shalivahana, Vikramaditya, The Legend of Lalitaditya	5 issues
The Indus Valley Adventure	2012	An Exciting Find, The Indus Valley Adventure	2 issues
Sons of Rama - The Graphic Novel	2012		Based on the movie
Dhyan Chand	2013		
Param Vir Chakra	2015		21 stories of Indian Military personnel who have been awarded The Param Vir Chakra, the highest military decoration in India. Collaboration with the Indian Army and the Indian Air Force
Leave it to Birbal	2016		19 stories collected from individual issues
Swachh Bharat	2016		Collaboration with the Ministry of Urban Development
Saptarshi - The Seven Supreme Sages	2016		9 Stories of Atri and Anasuya, Vasishtha and Arundhati, Kashyapa, Vishwamitra, Gautama and Ahalya, Jamadagni and Renuka, and Bharadwaja
Sardar Patel	2017		
APJ Abdul Kalam	2018		
Bharat Ke Veer - Alive in Our Hearts	2018		Stories of CAPF personnel martyred in the line of duty Collaboration with the Home Ministry to aid fundraising for the Bharat ke Veer fund
Shakti - Tales of the Mother Goddess	2018		7 stories of Annapoorna, Kanyakumari, Meenakshi, Brahmari, Mahi, Shashti, and Mookambika
Firebrands of the Freedom Struggle	2018	Chandra Shekhar Azad, Mangal Pande, Rani of Jhansi, Velu Thampi, Bagha Jatin	5 issues
Wit and Wisdom	2018	Birbal the Clever, Friends and Foes, Gopal the Jester, The Learned Pandit, Bikal the Terrible	5 issues
Legend and Lore - Regional Folktales of India	2019		18 stories
Gurudev Sri Sri Ravi Shankar	2019		Collaboration with the Art Of Living Foundation
Narasimha Reddy	2019		
Rama's Ring	2019		9 stories from alternate versions of the Ramayana
The Tata Story	2019		Collaboration with Tata Sons. For internal circulation only. Not available for sale to the general public.
The Devi Collection	2019	Ganga, Vaishno Devi, Saraswati, Shakti - Tales of the Mother Goddess, Tales of Durga	4 issues and 1 special issue
Tales of Temple Towns	2019	Jagannatha of Puri, Konark, Thanjavur, Tirupati, Vaishno Devi	5 issues Collaboration with The Times Group
Women Path-Breakers	2020		7 stories of Pandita Ramabai, Muthulakshmi Reddy, Anandibai Joshi, Rukhmabai, Anasuya Sarabhai, Janaki Ammal, and Anna Mani
Indo-Pak War Heroes: 1947 - 48	2020		First five stories from the Param Vir Chakra special about Somnath Sharma, Karam Singh, Rama Raghoba Rane, Jadunath Singh, and Piru Singh Shekhawat
The Annoying Ant and Other Stories from Around India	2020		4 stories about The Annoying Ant, The Ghost that Got Away, Ali's Donkey, and God Provides Only Published in digital form as of October 2025
Battlefront - Heroes of the 1971 War	2020		Includes stories 12 to 15 from the Param Vir Chakra special about Albert Ekka, Nirmaljit Singh Sekhon, Arun Khetrapal, and Hoshiar Singh
Stories by Uncle Pai	2020	Krishna, The Gita, Savitri, Rama, The Sons of Rama, Hanuman	6 issues
Demons vs Devas	2020	Krishna and Narakasura, Indra and Vritra, The Lord of Lanka	3 issues
Touring India	2020	The Historic City of Delhi, Konark, Ellora, Thanjavur, Heroes of Hampi	5 issues
Inspiring Teachers	2020		Vidyasagar, Rabindranath Tagore, A.P.J Abdul Kalam
River Stories	2021		3 stories of Godavari, Narmada, and Tamraparni. Only published in digital form as of October 2025
Valiant Women of India	2021		7 stories of Jhalkari Bai, Kanaklata Barua, Aruna Asaf Ali, Usha Mehta, Durgabai Deshmukh, Sarojini Naidu and Vijaya Lakshmi Pandit.
The Last Days of The Mughal Empire	2021		Only Published in digital form as of October 2025
Stories from Karnataka	2021	The Elusive Kaka, The Taming of Gulla, The Secret of the Talking Bird, The Sound of Music, A Couple of Misers	5 issues
Ranchen the Stone Lion and Other Stories	2021		4 stories of Ranchen and the Stone Lion, The Goddess Who Came Down to Earth, The Valley of Ancestors, and Buying a Song
The Spirits of Henasku and other Stories	2021		5 stories including The Spirits of Henasku, The Extraordinary Boy, Devchar and the Mother-in-Law, The Mouse's Share, and Clever Narayani
Sages and Apsaras	2021	Agastya, Vishwamitra, Urvashi, Hothal	4 issues
Stories from Kerala	2021	Narayana Guru, Tachcholi Othenan, Kochunni, Velu Thampi, Maarthaanda Varma	5 issues
Icons of Tamil Nadu	2021	Subramania Bharati, Srinivasa Ramanujan, Muthulakshmi Reddy, M.S. Subbulakshmi, Tiruppan	5 issues
The Lost Collection	2021	Tales of Avvaiyaar, Shridatta, Samarth Ramdas, Raja Desing, Padmavati	5 issues Covers are in full color, all panels are monochrome only
Ocean Stories	2021		6 stories of Saraswati and Vadavagni, Churning of the Ocean, Matsya Avatar, Varaha Avatar, Hanuman to the Rescue, and Mahi Rearranged pages from existing titles
Famous Stories from Great Storytellers	2021	Andher Nagari, Maarthaananda Varma, Satwant Kaur, Veer Dhaval, The Elusive Kaka	5 issues
Uncle Pai's Folktale Collection	2021		16 stories of Greedy Gubbanna, The Demon Who Came to Work, The Treasure Hunt, Chandralekha, The Tiger's Tale, Oh and Eh, He Counted Before Eating, Why Crabs Have Flat Bodies, The Foolish Frog King, The Lion, the Jackal, and the Donkey, The Bird Who Shed Golden Droppings, The Wheel Bearer, The Camel Who Was Beguiled By His Companion, Dharmabuddhi and Papabuddhi, and A Game of Chess Collaboration with Tinkle
Heroes of the Freedom Struggle	2021		2 stories of Kasturba Gandhi and Sucheta Kripalani
Stories of Vishnu	2021	Tales of Vishnu, Garuda, Krishna, Krishna and Rukmini, The Syamantaka Gem	5 issues
Saints of Maharashtra and Gujarat	2021	Narsinh Mehta, Tales of Sai Baba, Tukaram, Ekanath, Chokhamela	5 issues
Great Thinkers of India	2021	Adi Shankara, Ramana Maharshi, Sri Ramakrishna, Vivekananda, Manik Prabhu	5 issues
Heroes of Bengal	2021	Surjya Sen, Subhas Chandra Bose, Deshbandhu Chittranjan Das, Rash Behari Bose	4 issues
Ekadanta - Tales of Ganapati	2021		9 stories of Remover of Obstacles, Kartikeya's Anger, Ganesha and the Moon, Ganesha and Ravana, Ganesha Releases Kaveri, Ganesha and Gana, The Legend of Shami and Mandar, Veda Vyasa, Eight Avatars of Ganesha
Pioneers in Industry	2021	Ghanshyam Das Birla, Jamsetji Tata, Anant Pai, Verghese Kurein	4 issues
Stories from Punjab	2021	Ranjit Singh, Hari Singh Nalwa, Sakhi Sarwar, The Tiger Eater	4 issues
Operation Vijay	2021		Last four stories from the Param Vir Chakra special about Manoj Kumar Pandey, Yogendra Singh Yadav, Sanjay Kumar, and Vikram Batra
Musical Maestros	2021	Mirabai, M. S. Subbulakshmi	2 issues
Great People from the Puranas	2021	Nala Damayanti, Dhruva and Ashtavakra, Prahlad, King Harishchandra	4 issues
Stories from the Mughal Court	2021	Noor Jahan, Tansen, Kohinoor	3 issues
Buying A Song And Other Stories	2022		Stories from Himachal Pradesh, Ladakh, Nagaland, Sikkim, Meghalaya, Punjab, Madhya Pradesh, Gujarat, Maharashtra, Andhra Pradesh, Karnataka, Uttar Pradesh, Bihar, Rajasthan, the Andaman Islands, and Bhutan
Princesses and Queens	2022	Amba, Subhadra, Uloopi, Draupadi, Gandhari	5 issues
Stories from the Stage	2022	Ratnavali, Manonmani, Malati and Madhava, Malavika, Vasantasena, Udayana	6 issues
Kanikonna and Other Stories	2022		Folk tales from India and Bhutan
Divine Rivers	2022		11 stories about Ganges, Yamuna, Saraswati, Godavari, Narmada, Kaveri, Tamraparni, Krishna, Sabarmati, Beas, and Sutlej
Women in Power	2022		Stories of 15 women from the Constituent Assembly, including Begum Qudsia, Ammu Swaminathan, Leela Roy, Sarojini Naidu, Annie Mascarene, Purnima Banerji, Vijaya Lakshmi Pandit, Hansa Jivraj Mehta, Sucheta Kripalani, Kamala Chaudhri, Durgabai Deshmukh, Renuka Ray, Rajkumari Amrit Kaur, Dakshayani Velayudhan, and Malati Chaudhuri
The Invisible Monster	2022		6 stories from Nahali folklore including The Invisible Monster, Smelly Lily, The Crocodile and the Fox, The Careless Children, An Unlikely Trade, and More Crabs for Aati
The Lazy Crow	2022		7 stories from Ahirani folklore including The Lazy Crow, Of Rats and Hares, Kanu and Gopala, The Bull and the Leopard, The Sculptor, The Thorny Test, and The Fox in the Well
The King's Cook and the Fox	2022		7 stories from Siddi folklore including The King's Cook and the Fox, Worm and the Lazy Pigeon, The Perfect Partners, The Silly Sons-in-Law, It All Started With A Rat, The Greedy Medicine Woman, and No Worm For Pigeon
Krishna's Descendants	2022	Aniruddha, Pradyumna, Prabhavati, Bhanumati	4 issues
The Ramakrishna Collection	2022	Sri Ramakrishna, Swami Vivekananda, The Learned Pandit, The Pandit and the Milkmaid	4 issues
Royals of Rajasthan	2022	Bappa Rawal, Rana Kumbha, Prithviraj Chauhan, Padmini	4 issues
Scholars of Science	2022	Jagadis Chandra Bose, Anna Mani, APJ Abdul Kalam, Janaki Ammal, Vikram Sarabhai	5 issues
Tales of Victory	2022	Tales of Durga, Krishna and Narakasura, Rama, The Lord of Lanka	4 issues
India's Women - Unsung Heroes	2022		20 stories about Rani Abbakka, Velu Nachiyar, Jhalkari Bai, Matangini Hazra, Gulab Kaur, Chakali Ilamma, Padmaja Naidu, Bishni Devi Shah, Subhadra Kumari Chauhan, Durgawati Devi, Sucheta Kripalani, Accamma Cherian, Aruna Asif Ali, Durgabai Deshmukh, Rani Gaidinliu, Usha Mehta, Parbati Giri, Tarkeshwari Sinha, Snehlata Varma, and Tileswari Baruah Collaboration with the Ministry of Culture
Learned Greats	2022	Rabindranath Tagore, Jagadis Chandra Bose, Swami Vivekananda	3 issues
Devi - Legends of the Mother Goddess	2023	Shakti - Tales of the Mother Goddess, Mahadeva Vol. 2 - Shiva and Shakti	2 specials
Tribal Folklore of India	2023	The Invisible Monster, The Lazy Crow, The King's Cook and the Fox	3 specials
Regional Legends	2023	Vikramaditya’s Throne, Fool’s Disciples, Thugsen, Lila and Chanesar	4 issues
Tribal Leaders of the Freedom Struggle	2023		20 stories about Tilka Manjhi, Thalakkal Chanthu, Budhu Bhagat, Tirot Sing, Raghojirao Bhangre, Sidhu and Kanhu Murmu, Rendo Majhi, Chakra Bisoi, Nilambar and Pitambar, Ramji Gond, Telanga Kharia, Tantya Bhil, Paona Brajabasi, Birsa Munda, Matmur Jamoh, Tana Bhagat, Malati Mem, Laxman Naik, Helen Lepcha, and Putalimaya Devi Poddar
Devas - Stories of Vedic Deities	2023		10 stories about Agni, Brihaspati, Dattatreya, Prithvi, Pushan, Rudra, Soma, Varuna, Vayu, and Yama
The Story of IIT Madras - Journey to Global Eminence	2024		Collaboration with Tinkle and IIT Madras
The Naval Journey of India - Collector's Edition	2024	Millennia of Sea Travels, Tacking to the Blue Waters, Tales of Glory	3 specials Collaboration with the Indian Navy
Hanuman - The Eternal Devotee	2025	Hanuman, Hanuman to the Rescue, Bheema and Hanuman, Mahiravana, Sundara Kand	4 issues and 1 special
The First War of Indian Independence	2025	Mangal Pandey, Rani of Jhansi, The Rani of Kittur, Beni Madho and Pir Ali, Kunwar Singh	5 issues
The Energy Superhero	2025		Collaboration with Tinkle and ONGC
CIBIL Ki Kahaniyan	2025		Collaboration with Tinkle and TransUnion Features Suppandi
The CIPLA Story - A Legacy of Care	2026		Collaboration with Tinkle and CIPLA
The Crucible of Indian Science - The Story of IISc	2026		Collaboration with Tinkle and The Indian Institute of Science

== List of Chapter Books ==
Chapter Books mix panels from existing issues with simplified prose and new illustrations. They target a younger audience, and are released in collaboration with Rupa Publications, HarperCollins India, and Red Panda.

Chapter Books
Series	Title	Year	Adapted Stories	Notes
A Day With...	Mother Teresa	2010		1 story
A Day With...	Abraham Lincoln	2010		1 story
A Day With...	Nelson Mandela	2010		1 story
A Day With...	Bill Gates	2010		1 story
A Day With...	Neil Armstrong	2011		1 story
A Day With...	Pele	2011		1 story
A Day With...	Walt Disney	2011		1 story
A Day With...	The Beatles	2011		1 story
India - A History Through the Ages	Book 1 - The Harappan Civilisation and the Vedic Age	2021		1 story
India - A History Through the Ages	Book 2 - The Iron Age	2021		1 story
	Folktales Collection	2022	Buddhist Stories, Tales of Wit and Wisdom, Funny Folktales	3 specials
	Spiritual Leaders of India	2023	Kabir, Swami Vivekananda, Adi Shankara	3 issues
Heroes from the Ramayana	Volume 1	2023	The Unforgettable Meal, The Fiery Race, The Fulfilling Gift, Pride and Revenge	4 stories
Heroes from the Ramayana	Volume 2	2023	The Search for Justice, A True King, The Power Of Words, The Hidden Helper, A Tale of Trust	5 stories
Unforgettable Stories	Royal Fantasy Stories	2023	The Prince and The Magician, The Faithful Shepherd, The Rainbow Prince, Chandralat	3 stories
Unforgettable Stories	Favourite Indian Folktales	2023		
Unforgettable Stories	Stories From The Panchatantra	2023	The Foolish Frog King, Papabuddhi and the Merchant, Dantila and Goramba	3 stories
Most Loved Stories	Witty Minister Stories	2023		
Most Loved Stories	Jataka Tales	2023		
Most Loved Stories	Fabulous Fables from India	2023	The Annoying Ant, The Quick‑Thinking Wife, The Great Architect	3 stories
	Tales of Wit and Wisdom	2023		
	A Kingdom for His Love	2023		1 story
Fearless Freedom Fighters	Volume 1	2023	Jhalkari Bai, Kankalata Barua, Rash Behari Bose, Surjya Sen	4 stories
Fearless Freedom Fighters	Volume 2	2023	Usha Mehta, Bhagat Singh, Sardar Patel, Durgabai Deshmukh	4 stories
Empires of India	The Mauryas	2024	Chandragupta Maurya - A True King, Chanakya - The Mastermind, Ashoka - A Memorable Journey	3 stories
Empires of India	The Rajputs	2024	Victory Forever, The Heir Returns, The Battle of Haldighati, The Making of Rana Chattrasal	4 stories
Empires of India	The Marathas	2024	Shivaji, Tales of Shivaji, Sambhaji, Baji Rao I, Ahilyabai Holkar	5 issues
Empires of India	The Mughals	2024	Babur, Humayun, Akbar, Jahangir, Shah Jahan, Dara Shukoh and Aurangzeb	6 issues
Pride of India	Volume 1	2024	A.P.J Abdul Kalam, Mother Teresa, Mahatma Gandhi	3 stories
Pride of India	Volume 2	2024	Babasaheb Ambedkar, Kalpana Chawla, J.R.D Tata	3 stories
Pride of India	Volume 3	2024	Rani Lakshmibai, Lal Bahadur Shastri, Subhas Chandra Bose	3 stories
	Stories of Hanuman	2024	Bheema and Hanuman, Hanuman and Kalanemi, Setting Fire to Lanka, Hanuman and Sanjeevani, Arjuna, the Monkey, and the Boy	6 stories
	Young Princes from the Ramayana	2024	Luv and Kush, Rama's Infinite Form, Rama and Tataka, Rama and Ahalya, Sita's Svayamvara	5 stories
	The Royal Omnibus	2025	The Healthy King, The Ten Greatest Fools, The Bearer of Misfortune, Gopal Measures the Earth, Gopal and the Hilsa Fish, The Matchless Wit, The Monkey King's Sacrifice, The Loyal General, The Two Kings, How Akbar Met Birbal, Tenali Raman Foils the Thieves, Tenali and the Horse's Mouth, The Wise Answer, The Great Architect, The Prince and the Magician, The Faithful Shepherd, The Rainbow Prince, Chandralat, The Foolish Frog King	20 stories
Inspiring Tales from Indian History	Volume 1	2025	Sarojini Naidu, Surjya Sen, Chandra Shekhar Azad, Vijaya Lakshmi Pandit, Subramania Bharati	5 stories
Inspiring Tales from Indian History	Volume 2	2025	Anna Mani, Jim Corbett, Salim Ali, Srinivasa Ramanujan, M. S. Subbulakshmi	5 stories
Inspiring Tales from Indian History	Volume 3	2025	Jagadish Chandra Bose, Janki Ammai, Verghese Kurein, Sucheta Kriplani, Dhyan Chand	5 stories
	Tales of Courage	2025	Durga - The Slayer of Mahisha, The Pandava Princes - The Five Brave Brothers, Draupadi - The Fiesty Queen, Balarama - The Mighty Warrior	4 stories

== List of Box Sets ==
Amar Chitra Katha has released box sets with issues and specials related to a central theme or a specific epic story. In addition to the ones listed here, an annual Spotlight box is released with all the new issues of the past year.

Box Sets
Title	Year	Included Issues	Notes
Mahabharata	1989	Veda Vyasa, Bheeshma's Vow, The Advent of the Kuru Princes, The Pandavas at Hastinapura, Enter Drona, Enter Karna, The Conspiracy, The Escape, The Birth of Ghatotkacha, The Pandavas at Ekachakra, Enter Draupadi, Draupadi's Swayamvara, The Pandavas Recalled to Hastinapura, Arjuna's 12-Year-Long Exile, A Hall of Yudhishthira, The Pandavas Conquer the World, Yudhishthira's Rajsooya Yajna, Indraprastha Lost, The Pandavas in the Forest, Arjuna's Quest for Weapons, Arjuna in Indraloka, The Reunion, Duryodhana Humbled, The Twelfth Year, The Pandavas at Virata's Place, Panic in the Kaurava Camp, Sanjaya's Mission, Duryodhana Refuses to Yield, Krishna's Peace Mission, The War Begins, Bheeshma in Command, The Fall of Bheeshma, Drona's Vow, The Slaying of Abhimanyu, Arjuna Fulfils His Vow, The Battle at Midnight, Karna in Command, The Kurus Routed, After the War, Yudhishthira's Coronation, The Ashwamedha Yajna, The Celestial Reunion	42 issues
Bhagawat - The Krishna Avatar	2000	The Darling of Gokul, The Subduer of Kaliya, The Upholder of Govardhan, Victory over Kamsa, The Lord of Dwaraka, The Enchanter, The Victorious, An Ally of the Pandavas, The Saviour	9 issues
Makers of Modern India	2003	Adi Shankara, Guru Nanak, Tales of Sai Baba, Babasaheb Ambedkar, Vivekananda, Lal Bahadur Shastri, Mahatma Gandhi, Jawaharlal Nehru, Soordas, Sri Ramakrishna, Subramania Bharati, Veer Savarkar, Subhas Chandra Bose, Rani of Jhansi, Bhagat Singh	15 issues
Mahabharata	2006	The Kuru Princes of Hastinapura, The Pandavas in Exile, On the Battlefield of Kurukshetra	3 specials
Tulsidas's Ramayana	2007	The Childhood Days of Ram, Ram in Exile, The Abduction of Sita, In Search of Sita, and Ram the Victorious	5 specials Originally titled Ram Charit Manas
Comic Book Guide to India	2008	Akbar, Ashoka, Bhagat Singh, Birbal The Wise, Buddha, Elephanta, Ellora Caves, Ganesha, Guru Nanak, The Mouse Merchant, Kannagi, Krishna, Mahabharata, Mahatma Gandhi, The Brahmin & The Goat, Rabindranath Tagore, Rana Pratap, Rani Of Jhansi, Shakuntala, Shiva Parvati, Shivaji, Tales Of Durga, The Gita, The Historic City Of Delhi, Valmiki's Ramayana	25 issues
Panchatantra, Hitopadesha and Jataka Tales	2008	The Jackal And The War Drum, Monkey Stories, Jackal Stories, Elephant Stories, Deer Stories, Choice Of Friends, How The Jackal Ate The Elephant, Crows And Owls, The Brahmin And The Goat, Bird Stories, The Magic Chant, The Giant And The Dwarf, The Mouse Merchant, The Greedy Mother-In-Law, The Dullard And Other Stories, Stories Of Wisdom, True Friends, Stories Of Courage, Tales Of Misers, The Hidden Treasure, Nandivishala, How Friends Are Parted, The Deadly Feast	24 issues
Uncle Pai's Favourite 50	2010	Angulimala, Abhimanyu, Adventures Of Baddu And Chhotu, Akbar, Ashoka, Bhagat Singh, Birbal The Wise, Buddha, Chanakya, Ganesha, Ganga, Gopal And The Cowherd, Hanuman, Hanuman To The Rescue, Hitopadesha: Choice Of Friends, Jallianwala Bagh, Jataka Tales: Monkey Stories, Jataka Tales: The Giant And The Dwarf, Jataka Tales: The Mouse Merchant, Krishna, Kannagi: Based On Tamil Classic, Krishna And Rukmini, Kumbhakarna, Lokamanya Tilak, Mahiravana, Mirabai, Nala Damayanti, Panchatantra: The Brahmin And The Goat, Paurava And Alexander, Rabindranath Tagore, Ram Shastri, Rama, Rana Pratap, Rani Durgavati, Rani Of Jhansi, Savitri, Shakuntala, Shivaji, Sri. Ramakrishna, Subhas Chandra Bose, Sudama, The Sons Of Rama, The Gita, Tulsidas, Udayana, Urvashi, Vasantasena, Veer Savarkar, Vidyasagar, Vivekananda	50 issues
Legendary Rulers of India	2010	Brave Queens, Warrior Kings, Conquerers, Visionary Kings, Administrators	5 specials
Gods and Goddesses	2010	Ashini Kumars, Ayyappan, Churning of the Ocean, Ganesha, Indra and Shachi, Indra and Shibi, Karttikeya, Krishna, Krishna and Rukmini, Krishna and Shishupala, Krishna and Jarasandha, Parijata Tree, Parshurama, Tales of Balarama, Rama, Sati and Shiva, Shiva and Parvati, Surya, Syamantaka Gem, Tales of Durga, Tales of Shiva, Tales of Vishnu	22 issues Also released as a single special numbered EM-1
Great Indian Classics	2010	Shakuntala, Malavika, Urvashi, Udayana, Ratnavali, Vasantasena, Nagananda, Bankim Chandra, Devi Choudhurani, Ananda Math, Raj Singh, Kapala Kundala, Kannagi, Manonmani, Prince Jivaka, Kumanan, Satwant Kaur, Veer Dhaval, The Elusive Kaka, The Taming of Gulla, The Legend of Marthanda Varma	20 issues Also released as a single special issue
The Best of Indian Wit and Wisdom	2010	The Adventures of Baddu and Chhottu, Birbal the Witty, Elephant stories, The Brahmin and the Goat, Choice of Friends, Raman the Matchless Wit, Kesari the Flying Thief, Birbal The Clever, Bikal The Terrible, The Mouse Merchant, Gopal The Jester, The Jackal and the War Drum, Friends and Foes, The learned Pandit, The Pious Cat and other Animal Stories	15 issues
Leaders Collection	2010	Tanaji, Babasaheb Ambedkar, Lokamanya Tilak, Veer Savarkar, Hemu, Babur, Jawaharlal Nehru, Beni Madho and Pir Ali, Jamsetji Tata, Sultana Razia	10 issues
The Essence of India	2010	Akbar, Ashoka, Bhagat Singh, Birbal the Wise, Buddha, Elephanta, Ellora Caves, Ganesha, Jagadis Chandra Bose, The Mouse Merchant, Krishna, Kannagi, Mahabharata, Rabindranath Tagore, Rana Pratap, Rani of Jhansi, Shakuntala, Shiva Parvati, Shivaji, Tales of Vishnu, The Brahmin and The Goat, The Gita, The Historic City of Delhi, Raman of Tenali, Valmiki’s Ramayana, Mahatma Gandhi	24 issues and 2 specials
Block Buster 1	2010	Mother Teresa, Surjya Sen, Heroes Of Hampi, Tales Of Indra, Tirupati, Vaishno Devi, Ganesha And The Moon, Tenzing Norgay, Stories Of Creation, Konark, Anant Pai, Salim Ali, Tanjavur, The Blue Umbrella, Jim Corbett.	15 issues
Bravehearts - People Who Fought For Freedom	2010	Banda Bahadur, Krishna Deva Raya, Bagha Jatin, Mangal Pandey, Paurava & Alexander, The Rani of Kittur, Sultana Razia, Bhagat Singh, Surjya Sen, Rani Abbakka, Rani of Jansi, Velu Thampi, Rani Durgavati, Subash Chandra Bose, Shivaji, Ranjit Singh, Rash Behari Bose, Jallianwalla Bagh, Chandra Shekhar Azad, Lachit Barphukan, Chand Bibi, Amar Singh Rathor, Veer Savarkar	23 issues
The Best Jataka Tales	2012	Nandivishala, Elephant Stories, Deer Stories, Bird Stories, The Magic Chant, The Giant and the Dwarf, The Mouse Merchant, Stories of Wisdom, True Friends, Stories of Courage, Tales of Misers, The Hidden Treasure, Monkey Stories, Battle of Wits, The Deadly Feast	15 issues Collaboration with Reader's Digest
The South India Collection	2012	Adi Shankara, Adventures of Agad Dutta, Ayyappan, Basaweshwara, Chand Bibi, Kannagi, Kartikeya, Kesari the Flying Thief, Krishnadeva Raya, Madhvacharya, Raja Raja Chola, Raman Of Tenali, Raman The Matchless Wit, Ramana Maharshi, Ramanuja, Shalivahana, Subramania Bharati, Swami Chinmayananda, Tales of Maryada Rama, The Celestial Necklace, The Fool's Disciples, The Magic Grove, The Prince and the Magician, The Tiger and The Woodpecker, Tipu Sultan	25 issues
Timeless Ten Children's Bedtime Stories	2012	Krishna, Mirabai, Shakuntala, Vishnu to the Tescue, Ganesha, The Brahmin and the Goat, Rani of Jhansi, Prithviraj Chauhan, Shivaji, Valmiki’s Ramayana	10 issues
Tales of Birbal and Other Stories	2014	Birbal the Just, Birbal the Wise, Birbal the Witty, Birbal the Clever, Birbal to the Rescue, Birbal the Genius, The Inimitable Birbal, The Quick-Witted Birbal, Raman of Tenali, Raman the Matchless Wit, Gopal the Jester	10 issues
The Ultimate Collection	2014	The complete set of in-print issues	315 issues and 10 specials Also released as 3 boxes
Great Indian Stories of Courage and Sacrifice	2014	A Nation Awakes, Ahilyabai Holkar, Ajatashatru, Akbar, Amar Singh Rathor, Ashoka, Babur, Bagha Jatin, Bajirao I, Baladitya and Yashodharma, Balban, Banda Bahadur, Bappa Rawal, Beni Madho and Pir Ali, Bhagat Singh, Bidhi Chand, Bimbisara, Chand Bibi, Chandra Shekar Azad, Chandragupta Maurya, Chennamma of Keladi, Dara Shukho and Aurangzeb, Dhyan Chand, Durgadas, Ellora Caves, Hakka and Bukka, Hari Singh Nalwa, Harsha, Hemu, Humayun, Jahangir, Jallianwala Bagh, Kalpana Chawla, King Shalivahana, Kochunni, Krishnadeva Raya, Kunwar Singh, Lachit Barphukan, Lalitaditya, Mahatma Gandhi, Mangal Pande, Noor Jahan, Padmini, Panna and Hadi Rani, Paurava and Alexander, Prithviraj Chauhan, Raja Bhoja, Raja Raja Chola, Rana Kumbha, Rana Pratap, Rana Sanga, Rani Abbakka, Rani Durgavati, Rani of Jhansi, Ranjit Singh, Rash Behari Bose, Roopmati, Sambhaji, Samudra Gupta, Sea Route To India, Shah Jahan, Shantala, Sher Shah, Shivaji, Story of the Freedom Struggle, Subhas Chandra Bose, Sultana Razia, Surjya Sen, Tachcholi Othenan, Tales of Shivaji, Tanaji, Tenzing Norgay, The Historic City of Delhi, The Indus Valley Adventure, The Rani of Kittur, Tipu Sultan, Veer Hammir, Veer Savarkar, Velu Thampi, Vikramaditya	76 issues and 4 specials
Valmiki's Ramayana	2017	Bala Kand, Ayodhya Kand, Aranya Kand, Kishkindha Kand, Sundara Kand, Yuddha Kand	6 specials
Stories of Faith	2019	Mirabai, Chaitanya Mahaprabhu, Guru Nanak, Gyaneswar, Tales of Sai Baba	5 issues
Mahadeva - Stories from the Shiva Purana	2020	In the Beginning, Shiva and Shakti, Kartikeya and Ganesha, The Jyotirlingas, Shiva the Saviour, Moksha	6 specials
Classic Bundle	2020	Krishna, Tulsidas, Birbal to the Rescue, Subhas Chandra Bose, Bheeshma, Jallianwala Bagh, Kabir, Rana Pratap, Sati and Shiva, Ganga	10 issues
The Complete Mythology Collection	2022	The Gita, Valmiki's Ramayana, The Mahabharata, Tales From The Puranas, Dashavatar, Narada, Vishwamitra, Surya, Indra, The Churning of the Ocean, Tales of Arjuna, Harishchandra, Draupadi, Yudhishthira, Karna, Abhimanyu, Bheema, Drona, Bheeshma, Ghatotkacha, Tales from the Upanishads, Nala Dhamayanthi, Ravana, Prahlad, Sudama, Uttanka, Aruni	75 issues
Visionaries of India	2022	Verghese Kurein, Mother Teresa, Albert Einstein, Jawaharlal Nehru, Babasaheb Ambedkar, Jamsetji Tata, Sri Ramakrishna, Mirabai, Rabindranath Tagore, Narayan Guru, Subhas Chandra Bose, Ramana Maharshi, Adi Shankara, Mahavira, Ramanuja, Jagadis Chandra Bose, Tulsidas, Subramania Bharati, J. R. D. Tata, Chokha Mela, Tales of Sai Baba, Vidyasagar, Eknath, Jayaprakash Narayan	25 Issues
Bravehearts of India	2022	Veer Savarkar, Jallianwala Bagh, Rani Abbakka, Chandra Shekhar Azad, Ashoka, Baji Rao I, Shivaji, Rana Pratap, Ahilyabai Holkar, Chandragupta Maurya, Sultana Razia, Vikramaditya, Rani of Jhansi, Raja Raja Chola, Sher Shah, Tipu sultan, Ranjit Singh, Rana Kumbha, Akbar, The Legend of Lalitaditya, Rana Sanga, Bhagat Singh, Mangal Pandey, Tanaji, Rani Durgavati	25 Issues
The Festival Collection	2023	Funny Folktales, Tales of Wit and Wisdom, Amazing Folktales from South Asia, Jataka Tales, Fabulous Fables from India.	5 chapter books
Epics and Mythology of India / Itihaas Collection	2023	Gandhari, Vishwamitra, Tales of Balarama, Shiva Parvati, Ashwini Kumars, Indra and Shibi, The Pandavas in Hiding, Ganga, Kumbhakarna, Rama, Kartikeya, Tales of Shiva, Ganesha, Hanuman, Prahlad, Karna, Saraswati, Krishna and Rukmini, Konark, Tirupati, Tales of Arjuna, Tales of Durga, The Gita	25 issues
Earth Pack	2023	Rana Pratap, Tales of Shivaji, Razia Sultana, Mangal Pandey, Rani of Jhansi, Krishnadeva Raya, Chandra Shekhar Azad, Tanaji, Shah Jahan, Sardar Patel	10 issues
Wind Pack	2023	Hanuman, Hanuman to the Rescue, Bhima and Hanuman, Vikram Sarabhai, JRD Tata, Divine Beings, Garuda, Ghatotkacha	8 issues
Fire Pack	2023	Chanakya, Kannagi, Konark, Surya, Draupadi, Subramania Bharati, APJ Abdul Kalam, Valiant Women, Karna, Subhas Chandra Bose	10 issues
Water Pack	2023	Divine Rivers, Ganga, Saraswati, Churning of the Ocean, Sea Route to India, Millennia of Sea Travels, Tacking to the Blue Waters, Tales of Glory, The Blue Umbrella, Raja Raja Chola	10 issues
Heart Pack	2023	Mirabai, Shakuntala, Urvashi, Sudama, Anant Pai, Mother Teresa, Buddha, Savitri and Aniruddha, Gopal and the Cowherd	10 issues
The Grand Amar Chitra Katha Collection	2023	Buddhist Stories, Tales of Wit and Wisdom, Funny Folktales, Amazing Folktales from South Asia, Fascinating Stories from India, Unusual Fables from India, Jataka Tales, Fabulous Fables from India, Witty Minister Stories, Stories from the Panchatantra, Royal Fantasy Stories and Favourite Indian Folktales	12 chapter books
Unforgettable Amar Chitra Katha Stories	2023	Stories From The Panchatantra, Royal Fantasy Stories, Favourite Indian Folktales	4 chapter books
Assorted Pack of 10/20/30	2024	Krishna, Tulsidas, Birbal to the Rescue, Subhas Chandra Bose, Bheeshma, Jallianwala Bagh, Kabir, Rana Pratap, Sati and Shiva, Ganga, Ashwini Kumars, Indra and Shibi, The Pandavas in Hiding, Mangal Pandey, Prahlad, Hanuman, Tales of Shiva, Ganesha, Lal Bahadur Shastri, Albert Einstein, Mahatma Gandhi, Tales of Revolutionaries, Param Vir Chakra	10, 20, or 30 randomly selected issues
Spotlight 2024	2024	Celestial Beings, Lakshmi, Devas, Savitri Bai Phule & Jyotirao Phule	4 issues
Best Of Amar Chitra Katha	2024	Stories from the Panchatantra, Tales of Wit and Wisdom, Jataka Tales, Fabulous Fables from India, Favourite Indian Folktales	5 chapter books
Assorted 5-in-1 Pack of 3/6	2025	Ancient Kings of India, Devotees of Vishnu, Famous Sikh Gurus, Stories About Freedom Fighters, Stories From Sanskrit Drama, Regional Folktales of India	3 or 6 randomly selected 5-in-1 specials
Elements of Nature	2025	Earth Pack, Wind Pack, Fire Pack, Water Pack, Heart Pack	5 box sets with 48 issues
Warriors and Legends of India	2025	Rani of Jhansi, Rana Pratap, Tales of Shivaji, Tipu Sultan, Ashoka, Prithviraj Chauhan, Vikramaditya, Lal Bahadur Shastri, Abhimanyu, Rani Durgavati	10 issues
Fierce and Fearless Women of India	2025	Rani of Jhansi, Kannagi, Ahilyabai Holkar, Ganga, Tales of Durga, Padmini, Rani Abbakka, Sultana Razia, Rani Durgavati	10 issues
Tales From Indian History	2025	Akbar, Babasaheb Ambedkar, The Revolt of 1857, Buddha, Harsha, Chandragupta Maurya, Vikramaditya, Subhas Chandra Bose, Bhagat Singh, Shivaji	10 issues
Festival Collection	2025	Lakshmi, Ganesha, Saraswati, Shiva Parvati	4 issues
All-In-One Amar Chitra Katha Collection	2025	The complete set of in-print issues and specials	350 issues and specials
Mythology Starter Pack	2026	Rama, Sita, Hanuman, Ravana, Vibhishana, Jatayu, The Sons of Rama, Kumbhakarna, Ganesha, Krishna, Shiva	10 issues
Ramayana Heroes Collection	2026	Rama, Hanuman, Ravana, Vali, Kumbhakarna	5 issues
Moral Stories Collection	2026	Bird Stories, Elephant Stories, Stories of Courage, Birbal the Clever, Raman of Tenali	5 issues

== Chaturang Katha ==
Chaturang Katha
- Author(s): Lakshmi Lal; Various Writers
- Owner: India Book House
- Illustrator(s): Ram Waeerkar Pratap Mullick; C. M. Vitankar Various Artists
- Current status/schedule: Ended
- Launch date: 1976
- End date: 1980
- Syndicate: Amar Chitra Katha
- Publisher: H. G. Mirchandani
- Genre: Folklore
- Original language: English; Hindi

Chaturang Katha (subtitled Pictorial Classics for Young and Old) was a line of 20 premium-sized comic books published in English and Hindi by H. G. Mirchandani for India Book House between 1976 and 1980. Lakshmi Lal edited the issues and wrote the scripts along with other authors. They were illustrated by ACK artists like Ram Waeerkar, Pratap Mullick, and C. M. Vitankar, resulting in a very similar art style. After publication ended, six issues were republished by ACK between 1987 and 1989, but others have been out of print since the early 1980s and are only available on the second-hand market. Their 5XX numbering scheme is unrelated to the ACK catalogue numbers.

List of Chaturang Katha Issues
Number	English Title	Source	Writer	Illustrator	ACK Reprint Number
501	Padmavati	Vetala Panchavimshati	Lakshmi Lal	H. S. Chavan	380
502	Hamsavali	Kathasaritsagara	Lakshmi Lal	Ram Waeerkar	374
503	Lila and Chanesar	Sindhi Folklore	Kamala Chandrakant	Ram Waeerkar	376
504	Virvar	Vetala Panchavimshati	Lakshmi Lal	H. S. Chavan	
505	The Strange Sacrifice	Vetala Panchavimshati	Lakshmi Lal	H. S. Chavan	
506	Chemmeen	Thakazhi Sivasankara Pillai	Harimohan Sharma	C. M. Vitankar	
507	Sundarasena	Kathasaritsagara	Lakshmi Lal	Pratap Mulick	388
508	Shringabhuja	Kathasaritsagara	Lakshmi Lal	Ram Waeerkar	378
509	Heer–Ranjha	Damodar Gulati	Lakshmi Lal	H. S. Chavan	
510	Nil Devi	Rajput Folklore	Lakshmi Lal	Madhu Powle	
511	Sassi–Punno	Sindhi Folklore	Shail Saral	Bal Thakur	
512	Lavanyavati	Vetala Panchavimshati	Lakshmi Lal	Madhu Powle	
513	Roopmati	Rajput Folklore	Jagjit Uppal	V. V. Sahasrabudhe	412
514	Chandraprabha	Vetala Panchavimshati	Lakshmi Lal	Umesh Burande	
515	Rupinika	Kathasaritsagara	Jagjit Uppal	D. Y. Acharekar	
516	Mastani	Rau	Jagjit Uppal	P. G. Bandodkar	
517	Muladeva	Kathasaritsagara	Jagjit Uppal	Madhu Powle	
518	Mirza–Sahiban	Punjabi Folklore	Lakshmi Lal	P. G. Bandodkar	
519	Kandarpa	Kathasaritsagara	Jagjit Uppal	D. Y. Acharekar	
520	Chauladevi	Gujarati Folklore	Jagjit Uppal	Bhaskar Kevale	

== Other Releases ==
Other Releases
Title	Year
Sons of Ram Multi Activity Book 1	2012
Sons of Ram Multi Activity Book 2	2012
The Amar Chitra Katha Quiz Book Volume 1	2022
Ramayana Coloring Book	2026
