= Gnanalaya =

One of India's largest private libraries

Gnanalaya Research Library
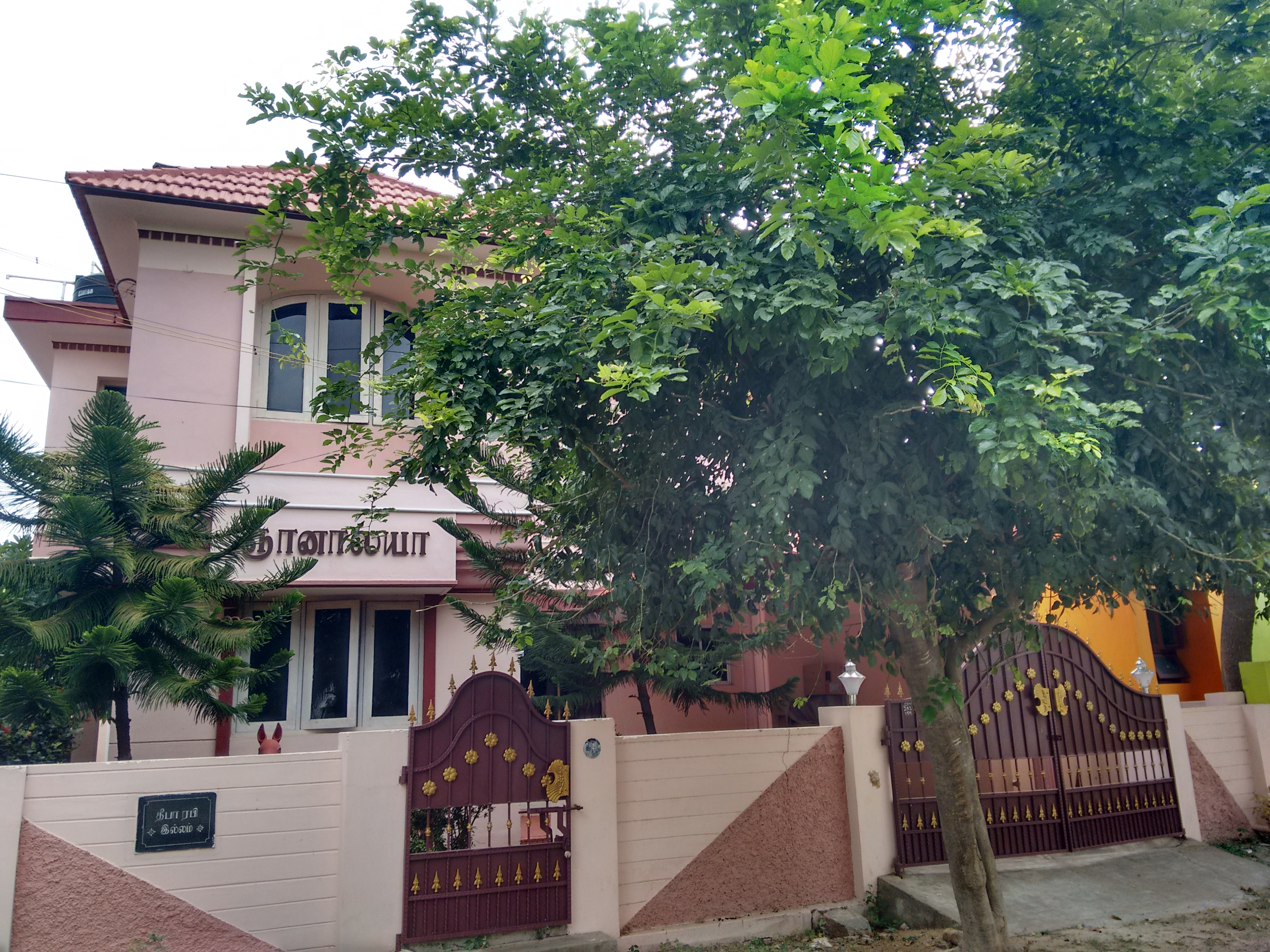
- Gnanalaya Research Library
- 10.396743677539975°N 78.7995625145056°E
- Location: Pudukottai, Tamil Nadu, India
- Type: private library

Gnanalaya is one of India's largest private libraries with rare first edition books, founded by B. Krishnamurthy and his wife Dorothy.

== Location ==
The library is situated at Palaniappa Nagar, Thirukkokarnam in Pudukottai, Tamil Nadu, India. It has been built at a height of 14 feet with windows at nine feet to let natural light and air work wonders.

== Collection ==
Having more than 15,000 titles in English and 70,000 titles in Tamil it has a collection of rare first editions of Tamil books and had selected treasures. This library was instrumental in reviving old and out of print, resulting in more than 3000 books being reprinted.

== Selected First Editions ==
- Veeramamunivar's 'Sathur Agarathy' (1842)
- French-Tamil Dictionary (1855)
- Tamil-Latin dictionary (1867)
- Standard edition of the Thiruvarutpa (1887)
- Vedanayagam Pillai's first novel 'Prathapa Mudaliar Charithram'

== Other selected treasures ==
- Letters of Rajaji
- Bharathiyar's daughter Thangammal Bharathi's first editions of Bharathi and Bharathidasan
- Revolutionary magazines 'Kudiarasu', 'Viduthalai'
- Gandhi's 'Harijan'
- Back issues of 'Reader's Digest' from the first Indian edition
- Tamil literary magazines from 1920 to 2010.
