= Dwarkanath =

Dwarkanath is a masculine given name of Indian origin. Notable people with this given name include:

- Dwarkanath Ganguly (1844–1898), Bengai social reformer
- Dwarkanath Gooptu (1818–1882), Indian doctor
- Dwarkanath Kotnis (1910–1942), Indian physician
- Dwarkanath Madhav Pitale (1882–1928), Marathi writer
- Dwarkanath Tagore (1794–1846), Indian industrialist

== See also ==
- Dwarakanath
