= Dwarakanath =

Dwarakanath is an Indian surname of Karnataka origin. Notable people with the name include:

- Bilikere Dwarakanath (born 1955), Indian biologist
- Bungle Shama Rao Dwarakanath (1942–2024), Indian actor better known as Dwarakish

== See also ==
- Dwarkanath
- Raghupati Dwarakanath Dixit
- Sir Chintaman Dwarakanath Deshmukh
