= Prathapa Mudaliar Charithram =

1879 Tamil novel by Samuel Vedanayagam Pillai

- Author: Samuel Vedanayagam Pillai
- Translator: Meenakshi Tyagarajan
- Language: Tamil
- Genre: Novel
- Publication date: 1879
- Publication place: India
- English publication date: 2005
- Media type: Print (Hardback)
- ISBN: 81-89020-42-0 Eng. edition
- OCLC: 67840366

Prathapa Mudaliar Charithram (English: The Life of Prathapa Mudaliar), written in 1857 and published in 1879, was the first novel in the Tamil language. Penned by Samuel Vedanayagam Pillai (1826-1889), it was a landmark in Tamil literature, which had hitherto seen writings only in poetry. The book gave birth to a new literary genre and Tamil prose began to be recognized as an increasingly important part of the language.

The author was the munsif (a 'Village President' with some judicial powers) of Mayuram (present day Mayiladuthurai near Thanjavur). Influenced by Western ideas of women's liberation and secularism, he set out to publish works that projected his ideals. His first publication was Pen Kalvi ("Female Education"), which he addressed to his daughters. After witnessing the explosion of novels in Western literature, he set out to publish his groundbreaking novel that would showcase the heroine of the novel as an equal of the hero, if not more savvy and righteous. The story revolves around the protagonist, Prathapa Mudaliar and his travails.

== Plot introduction ==
The story is a loose collection of events and narratives centered on a naive but good-natured hero and his life and adventures. It begins in a typical forward caste family setting, with the young Prathapa Mudhaliar, from Vellala Mudaliar family of Arcot indulging in hunting and enjoying himself. The plot also introduces the heroine as a rather intelligent and morally upright girl who marries the hero through a myriad of events.

== Plot summary ==
The novel is narrated in first person.

Soon they are separated and the wife is found wandering in the forest. In order to safeguard herself, she dresses up as a man and roams through the jungle. Meanwhile, a nearby kingdom loses its heir to the throne and as per custom, requires that a new king be chosen at random by the royal elephant. The elephant wanders into the forest and decides to put the flower garland on the unsuspecting young lady. Soon, she is proclaimed the chief of the region and carried to the royal palace.

The hero, meanwhile, is despondent after losing his wife and goes in search of her. En route to a city, the hero's sandals get torn, and he decides to repair them using the services of a cobbler. He promises the cobbler that if he stitches the footwear properly and the hero is satisfied, he will reward him with happiness. In a few minutes Prathapa's sandals are mended to his satisfaction and he in turn gives the cobbler one rupee (a princely amount in the era in which the novel is set). The cobbler, however, says he is not satisfied with the rupee and demands his "happiness", since that was the promise of Prathap. Perplexed at this sudden turn of events, a crowd soon gathers and no one is able to resolve the issue. Soon, the matter reaches the court of the new "King," who recognizes her husband despite his dishevelled and bewildered face. Prathap, however is unable to recognize the disguise of his wife and addresses her as the King.

She decides to settle this dispute by asking the cobbler if he was happy to see the kingdom's new king. He responds positively, to which she replies that since this quarrel with the young man resulted in his visit to the new king, which ultimately made the cobbler happy, he should go back to his duties, since "happiness" was provided. The cobbler, finding that he has no other way of needlessly harassing the young hero, returns. The "King" soon reveals herself to her husband in private quarters and, after entrusting the kingdom to a young apprentice in the court, leaves the kingdom. Both return to their house and live happily ever after.

== Characters ==
- Prathapa Mudhaliar - protagonist of the novel
- Gnanambal - Prathap's wife

== Literary significance and criticism ==
The idea of a novel in Tamil language was an instant hit. Though the level of literacy was still abysmal in late 19th century Tamil Nadu, sales of the book were still higher than expected. The novelty and success of this novel prompted many other writers to produce more such works. The novel was followed by Kamalambal Charitram by B. R. Rajam Iyer in 1893 and Padmavathi Charitram by A. Madhaviah in 1898, and set the trend for Tamil books.

=== Translations ===
The book was translated in various other languages including Dravidian languages and in English. The English translation was done by Meenakshi Tyagarajan in 2005. This also convinced many other writers in other Indian languages to write more prose-oriented books. Prathapa Mudaliar Charithram is still translated and published, with Amar Chitra Katha even creating a comic book adaptation of this novel.
