= C. M. Vitankar =

Indian comic creator, illustrator and poster artist

C M. Vitankar was an illustrator who created several covers for the popular Indian comic book series Amar Chitra Katha, as well another lesser-known series Manoj Chitra Katha. He also worked in the Hindi film industry in Mumbai as a poster artist, according to Nandini Chandra, author of The Classic Popular: Amar Chitra Katha, 1967-2007. He did the artworks for different Amar Chitra Katha comics like 'Ganesha', 'Tales of Shiva', 'Arjuna', 'the Monkey and the Boy' and 'Karttikeya' edited and published by Anant Pai
