= Samuel Vedanayagam Pillai =

Indian Tamil language poet

Vedanayagam Pillai
- Savarimuthu - Arokiya Mary
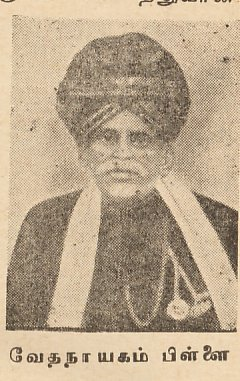
- Born: Samuel Vedanayagam Pillai; 11 October 1826; Inam Kulathur, Trichinopoly District, Madras Presidency, British India (now Tiruchirappalli District, Tamil Nadu, India)
- Died: 21 July 1889 (aged 62); Mayavaram, Tanjore District (Madras Presidency), British India (now Mayiladuthurai Mayiladuthurai district, Tamil Nadu, India)
- Occupations: Tamil scholar, poet, writer, civil servant
- Spouse(s): Pappammal, Lazar, Manickathammal, Annakkannammal
- Parent(s): Savarimuthu (Father) & Arokiya Mary (Mother)
- Writing career
- Pen name: S.V.P.

Samuel Vedanayagam Pillai (1826–1889), also known as Mayavaram Vedanayagam Pillai, was an Indian civil servant, Tamil poet, novelist and social worker who is remembered for the authorship of Prathapa Mudaliar Charithram (1879), recognized as the "first modern Tamil novel". Vedanayagam's ideals of women's liberation and education are reflected in the novel.

== Early life ==
Vedanayagam Pillai was born on 11 October 1826 in Inam Kulathur, a village in present-day Tiruchirappalli district to Arockia Mariammal and Savarimuthu Pillai, both of whom were Catholics. His father was his first tutor and later he learned Tamil and English under a tutor named Thayagaraja Pillai. On completing his education, Vedanayagam joined the judicial court of Trichinopoly as record keeper and soon was elevated as a translator. He learnt Sanskrit, French and Latin during his tenure and then cleared his law exams.

== Literary works ==
He became the District Munsiff of Mayuram (now Mayiladuthurai) and served there for 13 years. Vedanayagam showed a passion for writing from early age. He translated law books to Tamil and his ethical book called Neethi Nool was well accepted. In total he wrote 16 books of which Prathapa Mudaliar Charithram (1879) is regarded as the first Tamil Novel. The novel reflects Vedanaygam's ideals of women's liberation and education.

In 2007, his works were nationalised by the Government of Tamil Nadu.

== Carnatic music ==
Vedanayagam's contribution to Carnatic music is immense. His songs are still a popular choice among singers in concerts. One can find a profusion of Sanskrit words in his Tamil compositions. On the lines of Tyagaraja's "Nidhichala Sukhama" he wrote "Manam Peridha, Varumanam Peridha?" Some of the popular songs of Pillai are "Naale Nalla Nall", "Nee Malaikkade Nenje", and "Tharunam, tharunam". People like Manonmaniam Sundaram Pillai and Ramalinga Swamigal were admirers of his works.

One of his compositions Nayagar Pakshamadi, (a Ragamaliga - Saama / Shanmukhapriya / Kedaragaula) was included for a dance scene in the Tamil film Doctor Savithri (1955).

== Legacy and honours ==
His great-grandson Vijay Antony is an Indian music composer, playback singer, actor, film editor, lyricist, audio engineer, and filmmaker working predominantly in Tamil cinema.

On the paternal side, another great-grandson of Vedanayagam Pillai is Dr. Jeffrey Vedanayagam, who is a faculty member at the University of Texas at San Antonio.

The Government of Tamil Nadu is constructing a multipurpose auditorium and statue in Mayiladuthurai to honor Vedanayagam. The project, initiated by the Information and Public Relations Department, is nearing completion on an 884-square-metre site in Arokiyanathapuram. The foundation stone was laid on 5 October 2023, with a budget of ₹3 crore allocated by the state government.

== See also ==
- Tamil literature
- U. V. Swaminatha Iyer
- Ramalinga Swamigal
- Subramania Bharati
- Meenakshi Sundaram Pillai
