= Mahabharata (comics) =

Comic book series published by Amar Chitra Katha Private Limited

- Mahabharata (vol I of III), cover art by Ramesh Umrotkar

Publication information
- Publisher: Amar Chitra Katha and first issue by: ACK, IBH
- Schedule: Alternative Title Schedule
- Format: Limited series
- Genre: Mythology
- Publication date: 1985 - 89
- No. of issues: 42

Creative team
- Written by: Kamala Chandrakant • TMP Nedungadi • Subba Rao • Yagya Sharma • Lopamudra • Mihir Lal Mitra • Sumona Roy • Mohan Swaminathan • Shubha Kandhekar • Margie Sastry
- Artist: Dilip Kadam
- Editor: Anant Pai

Collected editions
- Volume 1: ISBN 978-81-905990-4-7
- Volume 2: ISBN 978-81-905990-2-3
- Volume 3: ISBN 978-81-905990-3-0

Mahabharata (also known as Amar Chitra Katha's Mahabharata) is a comic adaptation of the Indian epic poem Mahabharata. The 42-issue best-selling series by Amar Chitra Katha, Mumbai was illustrated by Dilip Kadam. The team of script writers (who took turns to complete the 42 issues) included Kamala Chandrakant, TMP Nedungadi, Subba Rao, Yagya Sharma, Lopamudra, Mihir Lal Mitra, Sumona Roy, Mohan Swaminathan, Shubha Kandhekar and Margie Sastry.

The Mahabharata is often regarded as one of the most popular titles in the history of Amar Chitra Katha. It is an adaptation of Kashidasi Mahabharata. It is also the longest series (42 issue run on an alternative title schedule; from 329 to 441 [1985-89] in over more than 1300 pages) to have been produced by the ACK. The series was originally planned for 60 albums, but it was later cut short to 42.

== Concept and creation ==
Amar Chitra Katha had a strong commitment to the Mahabharata from the very beginning. Many of its titles were from based on particular events or characters from the Mahabharata. In March 1985, the new project began, "in response to a persistent demand from our readers for a comprehensive account of the epic." The ambitious series by Anant Pai was initially decided as a 60 volume project, with one issue in every fortnight. However, in 1988, Amar Chitra Katha issued only one issue a month, so that Mahabharata numbers came out only in every two months.

The Mahabharata comics was based on,

- A Sanskrit text with Hindi translation by Pundit Ramnarayan Dutt Shastri Pandey (Gita Press, Gorakhpur)
- A Malayalam verse version by Kunjikkuttan Tampuram (SPCS, Kottayam)
- Pratap Chandra Roy's English prose version (Munshiram Manoharlal Publishers, New Delhi)
- Pune critical edition (Bhandarkar Oriental Research Institute, Pune)

== Structure ==
The comics does not include the Harivamsha (a supplement to the Mahabharata) and the abbreviated version of the Ramayana. It also omits the character Ugrasrava Sauti and the first issue ("Veda Vyasa") begins with sage Vyasa acquiring the elephant god Ganesha as his scribe and starting the dictation. It soon moves on to Vaisampayana narrating the epic to Janamejaya. This latter pair persist till the last panel of the series, appearing from time to time in panels colored differently. In addition, the events of the Battle of Kurukshetra was narrated to Dhritarashtra by his advisor Sanjaya, who both appeared in the middle of the battle sequences in different colored panels, thus making it a narration within a narration.

The comics also included various footnotes explaining the meaning Sanskrit terms, and the few issues also consisted a pronunciation guide and glossary. Issues usually start with a page containing a summary of the last few issues, and in the backdrop illustrations of the Gita setting, with Arjuna kneeling before Krishna in the battlefield.

== Individual titles ==
Several individual books were released containing both, the story from the perspectives of some of important characters with some untold stories not included in original books and other side stories found in Mahabharata, but omitted in the main volumes. They're

- Shakuntala
- Savitri
- Nala Damayanti
- Urvashi
- Nahusha
- Yayati
- Kacha and Devayani
- Indra and Shachi
- Golden Mongoose
- Tales of Arjuna
- Bheema and Hanuman
- Abhimanyu
- Pareekshit
- Uloopi
- Tales of Yudhistira
- Pandavas in the hiding
- The Pandava princes
- Amba
- Bheeshma
- Jayadratha
- Drona
- Ghatotkach
- Karna
- Draupadi
- Gandhari
- Chandrahasa
- Tapati
- Aruni and Uttanka
- Sukanya
- Indra and Shibi
- Jayadratha

Chapters about Krishna and yadavas

- Krishna the protector of Dharma
- Bhagavata Purana
- Krishna and Rukmini
- Krishna and Jarasandha
- Krishna and Shishupala
- Krishna and false Vasudeva
- The Shyamantaka Gem
- Krishna and Narakasura
- Parijata Tree
- Pradyumna
- Aniruddha
- Prabhavati
- Bhanumati
- Subhadra
- Tales of Balaram
- The Gita
- Sudama

== Influences and conflicts ==
Amar Chitra Katha series on Mahabarata (1985–89) coincided with Baldev Raj Chopra's famous television drama series Mahabharat (1988–90). Although, some fans took great pleasure in encountering Mahabharata in both mediums, the television series spelled big trouble for the comic book series. Amar Chitra Katha and the state-run Doordarshan television channel (DD National) competed for the same urban middle class audience.

It is widely accepted that visual and narrative "homogenization" occurs between the ACK'S Mahabharata and Baldev Raj Chopra's Mahabharat. Television producers have repeatedly turned to the Amar Chitra Katha series as reference material for costume design, set production, and subject matter.

"When the Mahabharat television series was made, I had friend who was a cameraman at the set. And he told me that they often brought the ACK Mahabharata series onto the set and used it as reference material-for dress, the building, and also for the episodes, the content. It is Kamala Chandrakant who deserves credit for this. She was thorough and very, very careful with regards to authenticity."

— Yagya Sharma, ACK author, on Mahabharata comics

The advertisements of the comic series contained the exhortation "Read it to enjoy your Sunday viewing [of the BR Chopra's Mahabharat]!". It seems possible that the comic series was hastened to 42 issues from 60 to take advantage of the television series.

== Collected formats ==
- The late 1980s saw the first of the collected format of the Mahabharata with a 7 volume "Library Edition".
- A 14 volume special edition was published in the late 1990s.
- A hard-bounded 3 volume edition in 1998 (reprinted in late 2007, 2012)
