= Pirojsha Godrej =

Pirojsha Godrej may refer to:

- Pirojsha Burjorji Godrej (1882–1972), founder of the Godrej Group
- Pirojsha Adi Godrej, great-grandson of Pirojsha Burjorji Godrej
