= Nath Madhav =

Marathi writer (1882–1928)

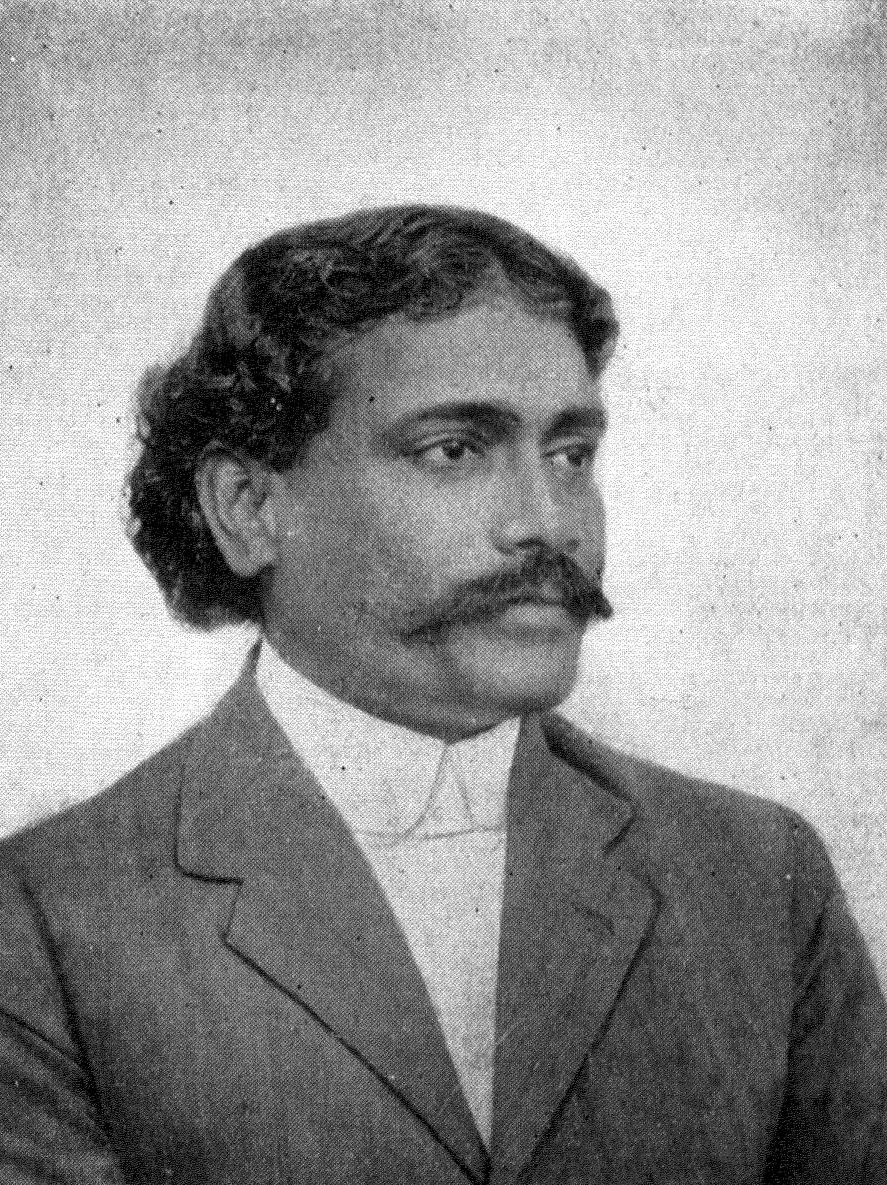
- Born: Dwarkanath Madhav Pitale; 3 April 1882; Bombay, British India
- Died: 21 June 1928 (aged 46); Bombay, British India
- Occupations: Novelist, playwright, poet
- Writing career
- Language: Marathi

Dwarkanath Madhav Pitale (3 April 1882 – 21 June 1928), widely known by his pen name Nath Madhav, was a prominent Marathi novelist, playwright, and poet. He wrote more than thirty novels covering both social and historical genres. After a hunting accident in 1905 left him permanently paralyzed below the waist, he began writing, initially publishing short articles in English before transitioning to Marathi fiction.

He wrote historical and social novels, the latter dealing with encouragement of women's education and remarriages of widows, condemnation of the abhorrent practice of arranged marriages of children with adults, and similar social issues of his times. He lived in Pune.

== Early life ==
Dwarkanath Madhav Pitale was born in Bombay on 3 April 1882. He completed his formal education in Bombay, during which he established a good reputation for his active participation in sports. However, owing to a general lack of inclination toward formal studies, he did not pass his matriculation examinations. Pitale then began working at the Gun Carriage Factory located in Colaba, a job that required him to travel frequently.

== Accident ==
During this timeframe, Pitale developed a strong passion for hunting. In 1905, while out on a hunting excursion, he suffered a severe fall from a high cliff. The accident resulted in the permanent loss of mobility in the lower half of his body, rendering him paralyzed from the waist down.

== Literary career ==
=== Early career ===
While undergoing medical treatment in the hospital following his accident, Pitale extensively read literature written in both English and Marathi. This inspired him to pursue writing. He began by writing a few articles in English, which were published in the Poona-based daily newspaper Deccan Herald.

Pitale later relocated to Panvel to seek local, indigenous medical treatments. During his stay there, he met and spent time with Prabodhankar Thackeray and Krushnaji Narayan Athalye (also known as Keralkokilkar). It was during this time that he actively began writing short stories and novels.

=== Social novels ===
Nath Madhav published his debut novel, Premveda, in 1908. He went on to write numerous social novels that primarily explored the plight and suffering of women, the foundational importance of home-based education, moral values, and contemporary social evils. His works in the social genre include:

- Hemchandra Rohini (1909)
- Rai Club athva Soneri Toli (published in two volumes; second edition in 1915 and final edition in 1924)
- Deshmukhwadi (1916)
- Vimlechi Grahadasha (1917)

His three-part social novel titled Doctor (1918–1920) achieved massive popularity and was later adapted into a Marathi feature film. The narrative centers on an uneducated husband who harbors deep misunderstandings about his educated wife and subsequently abandons her. The book chronicles how the wife goes on to complete a medical education and, through her humility and refined conduct, successfully transforms her husband's perspective.

=== Historical fiction and poetry ===
While his social novels were well-received, Nath Madhav attained his greatest renown through his historical fiction. His initial historical novel, Savlya Tandel, was published in 1909. It garnered unique widespread acclaim due to its novel subject matter, which focused closely on the powerful naval forces of Shivaji and the heroic naval commander (Tandel) who protected it.

He later authored an expansive series of historical novels that sequentially depicted historical eras from the early beginnings of the Marathi language:

- Swarajyachi Shriganesha (1921)
- Swarajyachi Sthapna (1922)
- Swarajyacha Karbhar (1923)
- Swarajyavaril Sankat (1923)
- Swarajyache Parivartan (1925)
- Swarajyachi Ghatna (with a second edition in 1925)
- Swarajyantil Dufali (1928)

Additionally, his 1913 novel Veerdhaval, which was based on extraordinary and marvelous stories, became highly celebrated. Apart from fiction, he also composed several plays and poems.

== Other works ==
Some of his novels, including the following:

- Sawlya Tandel (सावळ्या तांडेल)
- "Veerdhaval" (वीरधवल)
- Rayaclub or Soneri Toli (रायाक्लब उर्फ़ सोनेरी टोळी)
- Wihangwrund (विहंगवृंद)
- Doctor (डॉक्टर)
- Swarajyacha Shreeganesha (स्वराज्याचा श्रीगणेशा)
- Deshmukhwadi (देशमुखवाडी)

== Critical reception ==
In preparation for his historical fiction, Nath Madhav traveled extensively to various geographical regions to gather primary historical details and read numerous historical volumes. Despite these efforts, his historical works faced certain critical reviews. Critics argued that his novels fell short of constructing a fully accurate or authentic representation of the historical periods they intended to portray. Furthermore, his writing faced criticism for a perceived lack of adequate attention to literary style and character development.

== Death ==
Nath Madhav died in Bombay on 21 June 1928, at the age of 46.
