= Tanya Dubash =

Indian industrialist and businesswoman

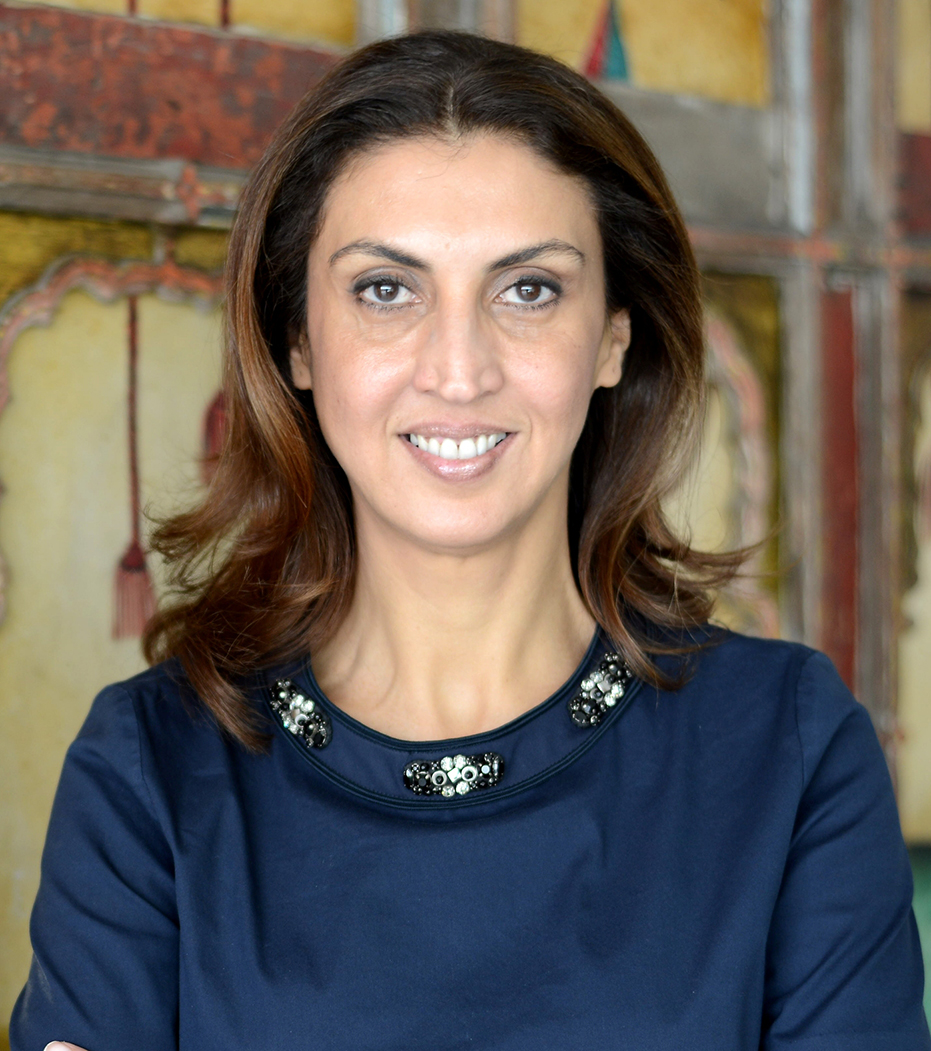
- Born: Tanya Godrej; 14 September 1968 (age 58)
- Education: Cathedral & John Connon School; Brown University
- Occupations: Executive Director and Chief Brand Officer of Godrej Industries Ltd
- Spouse: Arvind Darab Dubash
- Children: 2
- Parent(s): Adi Burjorji Godrej; Parmeshwar Godrej
- Relatives: Nisaba Adi Godrej (sister); Pirojsha Adi Godrej (brother)

Tanya Dubash (born 14 September 1968) is an Indian businesswoman, and an executive director and chief brand officer at the Godrej Group, and is known for taking up the responsibility for a rebranding exercise in 2008, Godrej Masterbrand Strategy. She is on the boards of Godrej Industries Limited, Godrej Consumer Products Limited, and Godrej Agrovet Limited. She was a board member of Bhartiya Mahila Bank and a trustee of Brown University. She is the elder daughter of the industrialist Adi Godrej.

== Education ==
Dubash attended The Cathedral & John Connon School, and is an A.B. (cum laude) in Economics & Political Science from Brown University, USA, and an alumna of Harvard Business School.

== Career ==
Dubash is the executive director and Chief Brand Officer of Godrej Industries Ltd. and is responsible for the Godrej Group's brand and communications function, including guiding the Godrej Masterbrand. She is the Director of Godrej Remote Services Ltd and Ensemble Holdings & Finance Ltd. She is a director of Godrej Industries Limited, Godrej Consumer Products Limited and Godrej Agrovet Limited and Godrej Finance Limited.

== Other boards and committees ==
Dubash was a Trustee of Brown University between 2012 and 2018. She is also a member of the Brown India Advisory Council and is on the Watson Institute board of overseers. Dubash was a member on the board of the Bharatiya Mahila Bank between November 2013 and May 2015. She is on the board of Customer Value Foundation, AIESEC India and India@75.

She also is on the boards of Britannia, Escorts, and Go Airlines.

== Recognition ==
She was recognised by the World Economic Forum as a Young Global Leader in 2007. In India Today conclave 2010, Dubash spoke about the conflict between reality and idealism.

== Personal life ==
Tanya is the first child of Adi and Parmeshwar Godrej. She has two younger siblings, a sister, Nisaba Godrej, who is the chairperson of Godrej Consumer Products and a brother, Pirojsha Adi Godrej, who heads Godrej Properties, the business empire's real estate arm. She married Arvind Darab Dubash, an industrialist, in 1997. They live in Mumbai with their two sons Aryaan and Azaar.
