= List of Midnight's Children characters =

This is a list of characters in Midnight's Children, a 1981 prize-winning novel by Salman Rushdie. Midnight's Children is an epic book about India's transition from British colonialism to independence. It is notable for the large number of characters, many are introduced and then reoccur much later in the narrative. Some change their names and some are referred to by nicknames.

The story is expressed through a wide range of fictional characters and is set in context by actual historical events. None of the fictional characters are based on real people, but historical events and real personages are mentioned and occasionally given a voice. This list contains only principal named characters, and may be incomplete.

- Saleem Sinai is the protagonist and narrator; a telepath with an enormous and constantly dripping nose, who is born at the exact moment that India becomes independent and who is of complex and confusing parentage. He is referred to variously as The Nose, Snotnose, and Sniffer referring to his nose; Stainface, Mapface and Piece of the Moon referring to his birthmarked face; Baldy referring to the bald patch on his head where the hair was pulled out by a violent school teacher; and the buddha during the time he loses his memory. He later develops a hyper-sensitive sense of smell. He is deaf in one ear from a blow received from his father, and has lost the tip of one finger in a bullying incident at school.
- Padma Mangroli is Saleem's lover and, eventually, his fiancée. Padma plays the role of the listener in the storytelling structure of the novel. She is described as plump, muscular and hairy.

== Characters introduced in Book One ==
Characters introduced in Book One (approximately 1915–1947) in approximate order of appearance:

- Aadam Aziz is a doctor and the father of Amina Sinai, or Mumtaz, Saleem's mother. He has many children with Naseem Ghani, and struggles with questions of the existence of God throughout the novel. He is a "half and halfer", an Indian with a western education and outlook. He narrowly survives death in the Amritsar Massacre of 1919.
- Aadam Aziz's Mother runs the jewel business of her husband. She is often shrewd toward Aadam. She spends time caring for her disabled husband until his passing, at which time she follows him, relieved of her duty.
- Aadam Aziz's Father is a formerly successful jewel merchant, whose mentality has now declined. He spends all his time in his room in the company of birds, who he can communicate with. When the birds leave, he passes away.
- Tai is a boatman on Dal Lake and a friend of Aadam Aziz. At times he demonstrates an ability to predict the future and, while most people consider him insane, he makes several insightful remarks, the most important of which is his advice to Aadam Aziz to "follow his nose."
- Naseem Ghani is the daughter of the wealthy landlord Ghani. She is first Aadam Aziz's patient and then becomes his wife. She is the mother of Mumtaz Aziz who later becomes Amina Sinai. She is dramatic and strong-willed, possessing a lot of power in her relationship with her husband Aadam Aziz. Later referred to by Saleem as "Reverend Mother". She has two large moles on her face referred to as witches nipples.
- Ghani the landowner is Naseem's father. He owns a lot of property around Dal Lake in Kashmir.
- Oskar Lubin is a German anarchist friend of Doctor Aziz from his student days in Heidelberg, Germany. He is killed in a road accident while demonstrating outside an army barracks in Germany in 1919 during the German Revolution.
- Ilse Lubin is Oskar's wife and another anarchist friend of Aadam Aziz from his student days in Heidelberg. After Oscar's death in 1919 she visits Aadam in Srinagar and drowns herself in Dal Lake.
- Ingrid is another anarchist friend in Heidelberg.
- Brigadier R. E. Dyer, an officer in the British army and Martial Law Commander of Amritsar who orders his men to fire on an unarmed crowd. An actual historical event and personage, see Reginald Dyer.
- Alia is the eldest daughter of Aadam and Naseem Aziz; she is the sister of Amina Sinai (Mumtaz) and Emerald. Together they are known as the "Teen Batti" or three bright lights. Alia suffers from a lifelong love for Ahmed Sinai, whom her sister Mumtaz marries. Her resentment toward her sister manifests itself in the meals she cooks, and therefore affects those who eat what she prepares. She is described as clever and plump. She becomes an unmarried school mistress in Pakistan.
- Amina Sinai (a.k.a. Mumtaz) is the middle daughter of Aadam and Naseem Aziz, the sister of Alia and Emerald. She is described as dark skinned; in later life she becomes plump and suffers from facial hair and verrucas. She has her name changed to Amina when she gets married. Rushdie repeatedly describes Amina Sinai as "assiduous" in her wifely efforts. By sheer willpower, she forces herself to love her husband Ahmed Sinai. However, during her marriage to him she also has an affair with Nadir Khan, to whom she was married for two years in her youth, although they never consummated the marriage.
- Mian Abdullah (Also known as the Hummingbird) is a pro-Indian Muslim political figure, who dies at the hands of assassins.
- The Rani of Cooch Naheen a wealthy Muslim woman who sponsors the political campaign of the Hummingbird. She is the intellectual friend of Aadam Aziz. Her name is a play-on-words, literally meaning "The Queen of Nothing" in English.
- Nadir Khan is Mumtaz's first husband. He is "the Hummingbird's" personal secretary, and is known for his rhymeless poetry. After the Hummingbird's assassination, Aadam Aziz agrees to hide Nadir in the Aziz basement. Naseem is so infuriated by Aadam's decision that she vows silence, which lasts for three years. Mumtaz falls in love with Nadir, they marry privately, and live together in the basement. Aadam discovers that the marriage has not been consummated after two years, Naseem breaks her silence berating her husband and Nadir, and Nadir summarily divorces Mumtaz and flees the household. He changes his name to Nasir Qasim and rekindles their relationship in clandestine meetings some ten years later.
- Hammdard the rickshawman is a rickshaw servant who lives behind Aadam and Naseem's house.
- Rashid the rickshaw boy is the son of Hammdard. He lives behind Aadam and Naseem's house. He is often seen talking with Hanif and other boys outside the house. He informs Doctor Aziz that Nadir Khan needs a place to hide. He later teaches the young Saleem how to ride a bicycle.
- Emerald the youngest and prettiest daughter of Aadam and Naseem Aziz; she is Saleem's aunt, the sister of Mumtaz. She marries General Zulfikar.
- General Zulfikar is the husband of Emerald, who is involved with Pakistani political events. Is described as having a face like Pulcinella. He becomes a father figure to Saleem during his stay in Pakistan. He is killed by his own son in the end.
- Ahmed Sinai is Saleem's father and Amina's husband. He is originally a dealer in leathercloth, but becomes a property speculator when he moves to Bombay. He dreams of reordering the chapters of the Koran in a true chronology. After Saleem is born, his wife loses interest in him and he becomes an alcoholic. He is also involved in the tetrapod business with Dr. Narlikar.
- Lifafa Das is a peep show street man who leads Amina to Shri Ramram Seth in gratitude after she saves his life from a Muslim mob.
- Shri Ramram Seth is a Hindu seer, a cousin of Lifafa Das. Amina visits him while pregnant and he makes prophecies on the future life of her yet unborn son, Saleem Sinai.
- William Methwold is an Englishman from whom the Sinais buy their house in Breach Candy, Bombay. When selling his housing estate, (known as Methwold's Estate) he stipulates that all buyers must live exactly as their previous English occupants did until the hour of independence. Methwold invites Wee Willie Winkie and his wife, Vanita to perform for him. He sends Winkie out on an errand, and seduces Vanita, resulting in Vanita becoming pregnant. Methwold is Saleem's biological father. He is said to be a direct descendant of William Methwold (c 1590- 1653) the historical Englishman who planned the city of Bombay.
- Wee Willie Winkie is an accordionist and entertainer. He is Shiva's non biological father, and Vanita's husband.
- Vanita is the wife of Wee Willie Winkie; she is revealed to be Saleem's biological mother, who dies during labor.
- Mary Pereira is a midwife and servant, who switches Shiva and Saleem at birth in an attempt at impressing her sweetheart Joseph D'Costa. She is consumed by guilt by her action and offers her services as Saleem's nursemaid to try to make amends. She is a Christianised Indian. After confessing her crime she flees to reemerge later as the owner of a pickle factory with the name of Mrs Braganza, a name she borrowed from Catherine of Braganza, the Portuguese princess who gave Bombay to the English in 1662 as part of her dowry.
- Joseph D'Costa is Mary Pereira's sweetheart, a hospital porter, a communist political radical and a most wanted man by the Indian police. He is cornered by police, bitten by a krait, and shot close to the Methwold Estate. Mary mistakes the leprosy-stricken Musa for his ghost.
- Suresh Narlikar is a child hating gynecologist and businessman, who lives on Methwold's Estate in Bombay. He owns the nursing home where both Saleem and Shiva are born at midnight on 15 August 1947. He forms a business partnership with Saleem's father, Ahmed Sinai, to reclaim land from the sea. He is killed by a mob of language marchers in 1957.
- Doctor Bose is the doctor who delivers Saleem. He works in the charity ward of Doctor Narlikar's nursing home.
- Ibrahim Ibrahim a next door neighbor in Sans Souci villa on Methwold's Estate in Bombay. He is elderly and owns sisal farms in Africa. He lives with his sons, Ismail and Ishaq.
- Ismail Ibrahim' a neighbour to the Sinai's who is a crooked lawyer. Amina asks him in secret to act for the family to recover Ahmed Sinai's frozen assets.
- Nussie Ibrahim, Ismail's wife, who is nicknamed The Duck because of the way she walks. She is the mother of Sonny Ibrahim.
- Ishaq Ibrahim, a hotel owner lives with his father and brother on the Methwold's Estate.
- Adi Dubash A nuclear physicist who works on India's nuclear program. Killed by choking on an orange pip.
- Mrs Dubash, his wife who is a religious fanatic. They are the ground floor neighbors to the Sinai's in the Versailles Villa on the Methwold's Estate in Bombay. Their son is called Cyrus the Great by the children of Methwold's Estate because of his intelligence.
- Cyrus the Great the Dubashes only son and childhood friend of Saleem's. After his father's death through choking on an orange pip his mother grooms him to become the guru Lord Kushro Khusrovand.
- Sonny Ibrahim is Saleem's neighbour and friend. His forceps birth has given him a misshapen forehead.
- Eyeslice Sabarmati one of Saleem's childhood friends on Methwold's Estate, the son of Commander Sabarmati and his wife Lila, and the brother of Hairoil. He is blinded in the right eye by a stone thrown by Shiva after he had taunted him about his poverty.
- Shiva is a boy who is born at the same moment as Saleem. He is the true biological son of Ahmed and Amina Sinai, but is raised in poverty in the Bombay slums, initially by Wee Willie Winkie, as he was switched at birth with the baby Saleem. Shiva possesses an amazing ability to fight. Shiva is the knees in the prophecy of "knees and nose" and is the possessor of abnormally large knees. His fighting skill makes him a war hero and gets him promoted to the rank of major in the Indian army. He is the biological father of Saleem's son Aadam.

== Characters introduced in Book Two ==
Characters introduced in book two (ca. 1947 – ca. 1965) in approximate order of appearance:

- Vishwanath the post boy is a servant at Methwold's Estate. He is seen frequently delivering messages to and from Methwold's Estate on his Arjuna Indiabike.
- Jamila Sinai is Saleem's younger sister, nicknamed "the brass monkey" because of her thick thatch of red-gold hair and because she is conceived the night her father's assets are frozen by the state. She goes on to become the most celebrated singer in West Pakistan, Jamila Singer.
- 'Dr Schaapsteker, an elderly expert on snake venom who rents the top floor of Buckingham Villa, the Sinai's house, after Ahmed Sinai's has his assets frozen.
- Purushottam, the sadhu who takes up residence in the Sinai's garden at Saleem's birth and lives with the garden tap dripping constantly on his head.
- Musa is the disgraced servant of Ahmed Sinai whom Mary mistakes for the ghost of Joseph D'Costa.
- Johny Vaheel, the police inspector who exposes Musa as the thief of the Sinai's valuables and corners Joseph D'Costa in the clock tower of Mahalaxmi Racecourse across the road from Methwold's Estate.
- Hanif is Saleem's uncle and Amina's brother. He is a screenwriter who enjoys some fame in his youth, but who grows disillusioned later in life with Bollywood and the superficiality of the film industry, and commits suicide. He is Pia's husband.
- Pia is Hanif's attractive wife, a former actress and later joint petrol-pump owner with Naseem, her mother-in-law.
- Mustapha Aziz is another uncle of Saleem's, the brother of Mumtaz, described as tall but stooped with a droopy mustache. He becomes a second rank civil servant in New Delhi, always passed over for promotion. His wife is Sonia. They have strangely silent children who've been beaten into submission.
- Sonia Aziz (née Khorovani) is Mustapha's wife. She is eventually committed as insane.
- Evie Lilith Burns is Saleem's American childhood sweetheart. She is a freckled tomboy with tooth braces. She later knifes an old lady on her return to America and is sent to reform school.
- Zafar, the son of General Zulfikar. Zafar suffers from bed-wetting which annoys his father and appalls women.
- Homi Catrack, a film magnate and racehorse owner who is a neighbour of the Sinai family in Bombay. He has an affair with Lila Sabarmati and is subsequently murdered by Commander Sabarmati. His idiot daughter Toxy lives in seclusion with her fearsome nurse Bi-Appah.
- Lila Sabarmati is commander Sabarmati's wife, who is shot, but not killed by him, for having an affair with Homi Catrack.
- Commander Sabarmati is the husband of Lila Sabarmati, a high flying officer in the Indian navy and neighbor to the Sinai's in Bombay. He shoots his unfaithful wife and murders her lover.
- Hairoil Sabarmati, the Sambarmati's son and classmate of Saleem.
- Alice Pereira is Mary's sister, who works for Ahmed Sinai as his secretary.
- Croaker Crusoe, the headmaster of the Cathedral School in Bombay where Saleem receives his education.
- Mr Emil Zagaloo is Saleem's geography teacher at the Cathedral School. He is sacked after pulling out a clump of Saleem's hair.
- Rushdie, a prefect at the Cathedral School. A minor character, but notable by the use of the author's name.
- Glandy Keith Colaco, an overweight bully at the cathedral school.
- Fat Perce Fishwala, another overweight bully at the cathedral school.
- Masha Miovic, a champion breaststroke swimmer and pupil at the Walsingham school. A friend of the Brass Monkey, she partners Saleem at the school social and faints when his finger is severed.
- Jimmy Kapadia, a classmate of Saleem's. He is a scholarship boy at the cathedral school, the son of a taxi driver. Saleem believes he murders him through a dream.
- Soumitra, one of the Midnight's Children, a boy who is able to travel through time.
- Sundari, one of the Midnight's Children, a girl of such intense beauty that she blinded her mother at her birth. Her face is later slashed with a knife by an aunt and she becomes a beggar.
- Parvati-the-witch is one of the Midnight's Children, and the only one to become a friend (and later wife) of Saleem, as Leylah Sinai. She is a child of the conjurers ghetto in New Delhi but can perform real magic. She is the mother of Shiva's biological son Aadam Sinai. She is killed in Sanjay Gandhi’s "cleansing" of the Jama Masjid slum during the Emergency of 1975–1977.
- Narada / Markandaya, one of the Midnight's Children who has the ability to change sex at will.
- Dom Minto, a private detective hired by Commander Sabarmati to investigate his wife's infidelity.
- Major (Retired) Alauddin Latif, nicknamed Uncle Puffs is Jamila Singer's agent. A former soldier in the Pakistan border patrol, he has seven daughters, known as the Puffias, who he offers to Saleem to choose one as a wife.
- Tai Bibi is a 512-year-old whore who Saleem visits in Karachi. She has the ability to change her body smell at will and mimic the smell of others.
- Mutasim is the son of a wealthy Pakistani who is western educated and has a Beatles haircut. He is an unsuccessful suitor to Jamila Singer. He is killed in the Indo-Pakistani War of 1965.

== Characters introduced in Book Three ==
Characters introduced in book three (c1965 - c1980?) in approximate order of appearance:-

- Ayooba Baloch the leader of Saleem's platoon in the Pakistani army. Nicknamed the tank. He is sixteen and hates vegetarianism or any sign of unmanliness. He is killed in the Bangladesh Liberation War of 1971, when, while mourning the unfairness of life with Saleem, he is shot by a sniper.
- Farooq Rasheed, one of Saleem's platoon in the Pakistani army. Sixteen years old and described as a born follower. Killed in the Bangladesh Liberation War when he is shot by a sniper while scouting a battlefield.
- Shaheed Dar, one of Saleem's platoon in the Pakistani army. Perhaps fifteen years old (he lied about his age), gloomy and resigned to martyrdom in the army. He is killed in the Bangladesh Liberation War when a grenade splits him in half. Saleem takes him to the top of a mosque, where his scream echoes over the loudspeaker as he bleeds out.
- Brigadier Iskandar Commander of the CUTIA unit (Canine Unit for Tracking and Intelligence Activities) of trained dog handlers.
- Lala Moin, batman to Brigadier Iskandar.
- Sgt Maj Najmuddin, Sergeant Major in the CUTIA unit.
- Deshmukh, the vendor of notions, an elderly peasant from Bangladesh met looting a battlefield.
- Sam Manekshaw Commander of the Indian army at the surrender of Dhaka. He was a former colleague of Tiger Niazi in the British colonial army. One of the few historical personages, given a voice in the novel.
- Tiger Niazi Commander of the Pakistan army at the surrender of Dhakar. One of the few historical personages, given a voice in the novel.
- Picture Singh (aka The Most Charming Man in The World) is a snake charmer from the conjurers' ghetto in New Delhi. He is seven feet tall, a communist and the undisputed leader of the ghetto. He becomes a father figure and a friend to Saleem. His photo once appeared on half the Kodak advertisements in India which gave him the nickname Picture.
- Master Viram, a sitarist whose playing is able to respond to and exaggerate the faintest emotions in the hearts of the audience.
- Resham Bibi, a superstitious old woman from the conjurers' ghetto in New Delhi. She sees Saleem as bad luck. She dies of cold.
- Chisti Khan a fakir from the conjurers' ghetto who has an ageless face.
- Roshanara Shetty, the child wife of the steel magnate S.P. Shetty. She manages to injure the ego of Shiva by telling him all the society ladies he courted were laughing at him behind his back.
- Aadam Sinai is Saleem's son, and Shiva and Pavarti-the-Witch's biological son. He has extraordinarily large ears and a strong will. He is part of a second wave of Midnight's Children.
- Durga is a washerwoman with huge lactating breasts. She is wet nurse to Aadam Sinai and a succubus to Picture Singh who becomes infatuated with her even as she drains his strength.
- The Widow is the novel's fictional representation of Indira Gandhi. The Widow is alluded to early in the novel, but is only revealed to be Indira Gandhi towards the end of Book Three. Much of the later tragic events that befall Saleem and the rest of the Midnight's Children are attributed to her.
- The Widow's Hand is a servant of the Widow and responsible for Saleem's torture. She has a similar hairstyle of the Widow, glasses and is described as very attractive. Her character is based on Rukhsana Sultana.
- Anand (Andy) Shrof, a Bombay westernised businessman, playboy, and owner of the Metro Cub Club.
- Maharaja of Cooch Naheen, a young snake charmer who rivals Picture Singh as the most charming man in the world.

== Notes ==
Unless otherwise stated all notes refer to pages in the Random House anniversary edition, 2006. ISBN 9780099578512
