= Satya Bhabha =

British actor

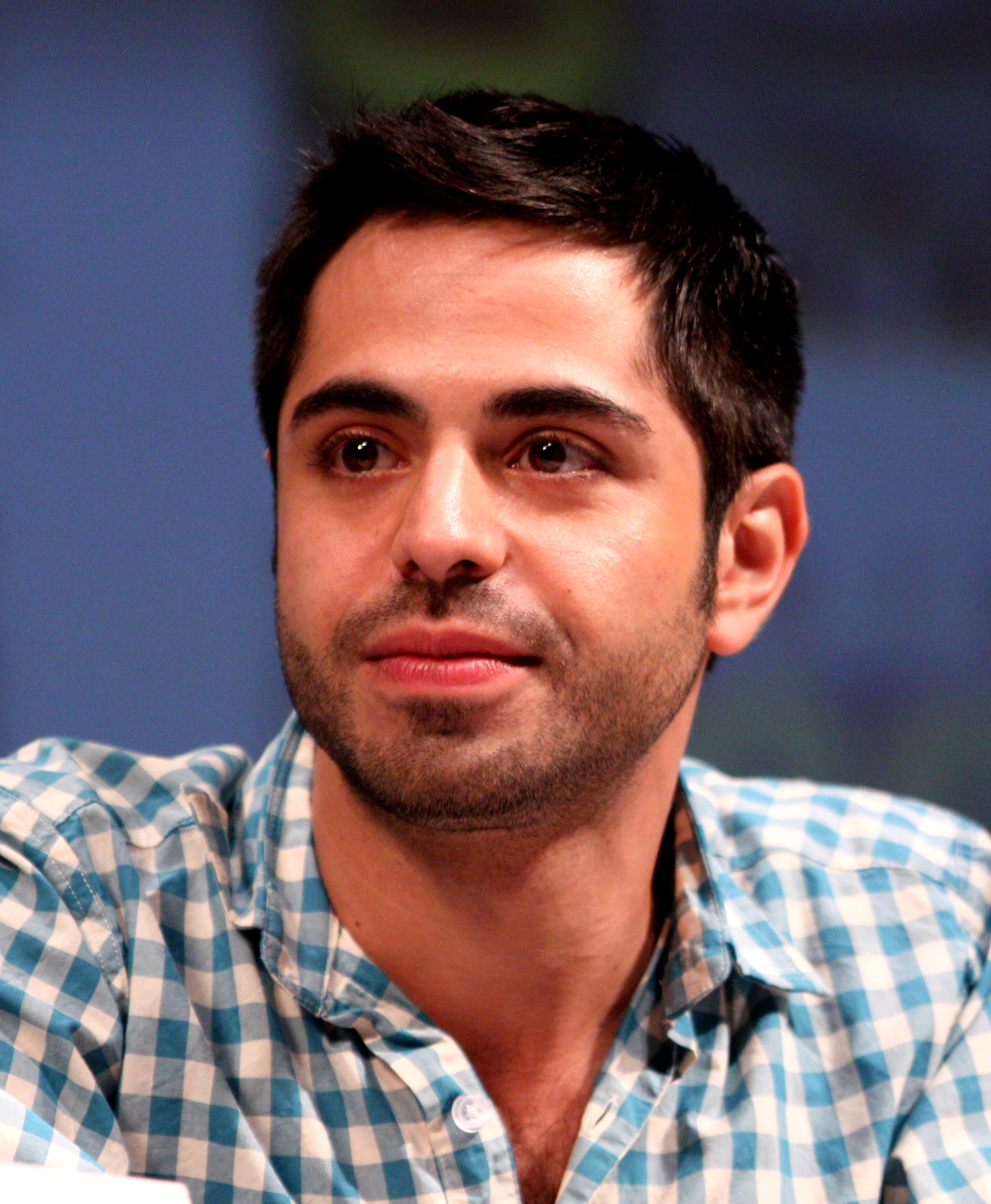
- Bhabha at the 2010 San Diego Comic-Con.
- Born: Satya Sorab Bhabha; 13 December 1983 (age 42); London, England, United Kingdom
- Occupations: Director, Actor
- Years active: 2003–present

Satya Sorab Bhabha (born 13 December 1983) is a British-Indian director and actor.

== Life and career ==
Bhabha was born in London, England. His father, professor Homi K. Bhabha, is an Indian Zoroastrian of Parsi heritage. His mother, lecturer Jacqueline Bhabha (née Strimpel), was born in India, to German Jewish parents, and grew up in Italy. He is a graduate of Yale University, where he acted in and directed student theatre productions, is said to have been a member of Skull and Bones, and was a recipient of the Louis Sudler Prize for Excellence in the Arts.

In 2010, Bhabha appeared in the film version of the graphic novel Scott Pilgrim, entitled Scott Pilgrim vs. the World. Bhabha plays the lead role in the Deepa Mehta film Midnight's Children (2012), based on Salman Rushdie's novel Midnight's Children.

In 2012, Bhabha was cast in the Fox sitcom New Girl. He plays a love interest and fiancé of Hannah Simone's character Cece.

Bhabha has been playing the cello since he was very young and has performed around the world in symphonies, as well as with different chamber ensembles. He has played cello for the band He's My Brother She's My Sister, a Los Angeles–based group. He has been married to his husband since 2016.

Bhabha has also worked extensively as a director in television and theatre. His television directing credits include Shameless (Showtime), Love Life (HBO Max), The Big Door Prize (Apple TV), Gossip Girl (HBO Max), Boarders (BBC), among others. In 2018, he co-founded the Los Angeles theatre company Public Assembly with Clara Aranovich and Alexander Tavitian, where the three serve as founding artistic directors. The company produces new theatrical work working with writers drawn directly from their audience, pioneering a radically accessible model of community theatre in Los Angeles. Bhabha's original theatre work includes True Story, an original performance piece that premiered in Copenhagen in 2023 and was subsequently presented in Europe, New York, and Los Angeles.

== Filmography ==
=== Directing ===
Year	Title	Notes
2026	Boarders	3 episodes
2024	The Pradeeps of Pittsburgh	2 episodes
2024	The Big Door Prize	2 episodes
2021-2022	Gossip Girl	3 episodes
2022	Queer as Folk	2 episodes
2021	Love Life	1 episode
2021	Love, Victor	1 episode
2020-2021	Prodigal Son	2 episodes
2021	The Gaze	short film
2021	Shameless	1 episode
2020	The Gaze: No Homo	1 episode
2019-2020	The Resident	2 episodes
2019	Single Parents	1 episode
2016	Cover Up	short
2015	Meals with Mary	

=== Acting ===
==== Film ====
Year	Title	Role	Notes
2003	Swordswallowers and Thin Men	Jon Weiner	
2010	Fair Game	B.U. Student No.2	
2010	Scott Pilgrim vs. the World	Matthew Patel	Nominated—Detroit Film Critics Society Award for Best Ensemble; Nominated—Scream Award for Best Villain (shared with Chris Evans, Brandon Routh, Mae Whitman, Shota Saito, Keita Saito and Jason Schwartzman)
2011	Weighting	Generic	Short
2012	Midnight's Children	Saleem Sinai	
2014	American Dream: The True Story	Josh D'Souza	
2015	Miss India America	Sanjay	
2018	Dude	Mr. Bemis	
2018	Change in the Air	Josh	

==== Television ====
Year	Title	Role	Notes
2011	The Good Wife	Jimal Mifsud	1 episode (season 3: episode 1)
2011	NCIS	Asa Zoranj	1 episode
2012	CollegeHumor Originals	Pavel	1 episode
2013	New Girl	Shivrang	Recurring role, 7 episodes: "Cooler" (season 2: episode 15) "Parking Spot" (season 2: episode 17) "Tinfinity" (season 2: episode 18) "Bachelorette Party" (season 2: episode 22) "Virgins" (season 2: episode 23) "Winston's Birthday" (season 2: episode 24) "Elaine's Big Day" (season 2: episode 25)
2014	Key & Peele	Terrorist No. 2	"Terrorist Meeting" (season 5: episode 3)
2015	Eastsiders	Jared	Recurring role, 6 episodes: "Weirder than Normal" (season 2: episode 1) "Jump" (season 2: episode 2) "And Gomorrah" (season 2: episode 4) "Sex Therapy" (season 2: episode 8) "Afternoon Delight" (season 2: episode 5); Thick Like a Lotion" (season 2: episode 8)
2015	Young & Hungry	Kal	"Young & How Gabi Got Her Job Back" (season 2: episode 11)
2017-18	Sense8	Habib	Recurring role, 5 episodes: "Who Am I?" (season 2: episode 2) "Obligate Mutualisms" (season 2: episode 3) "Polyphony" (season 2: episode 4) "Isolated Above, Connected Below" (season 2: episode 6) "Amor Vincit Omnia" (season 2: episode 12)
2021-22	Gossip Girl	—N/a	Director, 2 episodes: "Blackberry Narcissus" (season 1: episode 9) "Games, Trains and Automobiles" (season 2: episode 5)
2023	Scott Pilgrim Takes Off	Matthew Patel	Voice

==== Web Series ====
Year	Title	Role
2015	The New Adventures of Peter and Wendy	John Smee
2016	The Gay and Wondrous Life of Caleb Gallo	Andy
