= Taimur Khan =

Taimur Khan may refer to:

- Taimur Khan (Khyber Pakhtunkhwa cricketer) (born 1975), Pakistani cricketer
- Taimur Khan (Balochistan cricketer) (born 1991), Pakistani cricketer who played for Quetta
- Taimur Khan (Punjab cricketer) (born 1996), Pakistani cricketer who played for Rawalpindi
- Taimur Ali Khan, Pakistani politician elected in 2024
