= Breach Candy Hospital =

Private hospital in Mumbai

- Breach Candy Hospital Trust
- Location within Mumbai

Geography
- Location: Breach Candy, Mumbai, India
- Coordinates: 18°58′26″N 72°48′17″E

Organisation
- Type: General

Services
- Emergency department: Yes
- Beds: 220

History
- Founded: 1946

Links
- Website: www.breachcandyhospital.org
- Lists: Hospitals in India

Breach Candy Hospital is a private hospital located in Mumbai, India. It is located in the Breach Candy area of South Mumbai. It is well known for the famous patients that have been treated in the hospital.

== History ==
It was established in 1946 at the upmarket Breach Candy area in South Mumbai, and designed by an English architect Claude Batley.

It started functioning as a 25-bed nursing home. Today, BCH is a multi-specialty hospital with over 220 beds.

The hospital's specialists include some of the most distinguished names in the Indian medical profession.

Before 2005, the Pirojsha Godrej Foundation funded a wing of the hospital known as the Pirojsha Godrej Wing.

== Specialties and departments ==
Breach Candy Hospital is managed by the Breach Candy Hospital Trust. It provides the following services:

- Anesthesiology
- Bariatric surgery
- Blood bank
- Cardiology
- Cardiothoracic surgery
- Dermatology
- Endocrinology
- Ear, nose and throat
- General surgery
- Gynecology
- Hematology
- Neurology
- Oncology
- Ophthalmology
- Pediatric surgery
- Plastic surgery
- Psychiatry
- Radiology
- Rheumatology
- Sleep laboratory
- Urology
- Vascular surgery
- Neurosurgery
- Pulmonology

== Notable patients ==
The following notable and famous persons were patients at Breach Candy hospital:

- Former Prime Minister of India, Atal Bihari Vajpayee underwent a knee surgery at the hospital in 2000, when he was in office.
- Actor Saif Ali Khan and actress Kareena Kapoor Khan welcomed both their sons at the hospital — Taimur Ali Khan (born 20 December 2016) and Jehangir Ali Khan (born 21 February 2021).
- Dhirubhai Ambani, who was admitted to the hospital, died on 6 July 2002 after a major stroke.
- Vilasrao Deshmukh, a former Chief Minister of Maharashtra, was admitted to the hospital in the first week of August 2012. He was diagnosed with both liver and kidney failure. He was later taken to Global Hospital in Chennai, where he died on 14 August 2012.
- Socialite and philanthropist Parmeshwar Godrej died on 11 October 2016 due to a lung ailment at the hospital.
- Singer Lata Mangeshkar died on 6 February 2022, after a long battle with COVID-19 and pneumonia. She was admitted on 8 January 2022.
- Indian cricketer Virat Kohli and actress Anushka Sharma's daughter Vamika Kohli was born on 11 January 2021.
- Actress Nutan died on 21 February 1991 due to breast cancer.
- Actress Sara Ali Khan was born on 12 August 1995.
- Actress Nargis died on 3 May 1981 due to pancreatic cancer.
- Indian actor Akshay Kumar and former actress Twinkle Khanna's daughter Nitara was born on 25 September 2012.
- Indian actor Ajay Devgn and actress Kajol's daughter Nysa was born on 20 April 2003.
- Indian billionaire and business magnate, stock trader and investor Rakesh Jhunjhunwala died on 14 August 2022.
- Indian Music Director Jaikishan Dayabhai Panchal of Shankar-Jaikishan died on 12 September 1971.
- Indian filmmaker Ravi Chopra died on 12 November 2014.
- Indian Playback Singer Pankaj Udhas died at the hospital on 26 February 2024, after age-related medical conditions.
- Indian business tycoon Ratan Tata died at the hospital on 9 October 2024, after age-related medical conditions.
- Indian Playback Singer Asha Bhosle died at the hospital on 12 April 2026, after multiple organ failure.
- Indian physicist Uma Trivedi was born at the hospital on 30 June 1987 and went on to lead a prominent career at Imperial College London, pursuing a PhD in Cold Matter Physics.
- Indian actress Mithu Mukherjee died at the hospital on 21 September 2026 due to cancer.
