= Nisa Godrej =

Indian industrialist and businesswoman

Nisaba Adi Godrej
- Born: Nisaba Godrej; 1978 (age 47–48)
- Education: Cathedral & John Connon School; The Wharton School; Harvard Business School
- Occupations: Chairperson, Godrej Consumer Products
- Children: 2
- Parent(s): Adi Burjorji Godrej (father); Parmeshwar Godrej (mother)
- Relatives: Tanya Arvind Dubash (sister); Pirojsha Adi Godrej (brother)

Nisaba Adi "Nisa" Godrej (born 1978) is an Indian businesswoman, and the chair of Godrej Consumer Products (GCPL).

== Early life ==
Nisa is the youngest daughter of Adi Godrej and Parmeshwar Godrej. Her siblings are Tanya Dubash and Pirojsha Adi Godrej.

She completed her schooling from The Cathedral & John Connon School and did bachelor's degree from The Wharton School, University of Pennsylvania and an MBA from Harvard Business School.

== Career ==
Nisa has worked in various projects in innovation, strategy and HR for Godrej Industries and its associate companies. She was appointed to the board of Godrej Agrovet in the year 2008 and became executive chairperson of Godrej Consumer Products Limited (GCPL) in May 2017. She resigned from her the position of independent director on the board of VIP Industries in June 2024.
