= William Methwold =

English merchant

William Methwold (sometimes spelled Methold), (baptised 1590 in South Pickenham, near Swaffham, Norfolk; died 5 March 1653, Kensington), was an English merchant and colonial administrator in India. He is credited with identifying the site of Bombay as a strategic port.

A fictional character in the novel Midnight's Children by author Salman Rushdie bears the same name and is described as a direct descendant. (See List of Midnight's Children characters). He himself appears as a character in 1637: The Peacock Throne by Eric Flint and Griffin Barber.

== Life ==
He was the son of Thomas Methwold and his wife, Susan both of Swaffham, Norfolk. Sir William Methold, Chief Baron of the Irish Exchequer was his uncle, and Sir John Cheke, tutor to King Edward VI, was his great-great-uncle. At the age of sixteen he was apprenticed to an English merchant, and served him for four years in London and then five in Middelburg, Netherlands. During this time he gained knowledge of Latin, and became fluent in Dutch and French.

In September 1615 Methwold was accepted for service in the East India Company as a linguist and sailed in its 1616 fleet to Surat, in Gujarat, India. He travelled much in India, and visited the diamond mines of Golconda in 1621, being the first Englishman to accomplish the journey. His narrative of his Indian travels, entitled Relations of the Kingdome of Golchonda and other neighbouring Nations within the Gulfe of Bengal &c., was printed in 1626, when Methold had returned to England, in the fifth volume of Samuel Purchas's Pilgrims.

He prospered as a merchant in the employ of the company from a base in Masulipatam on the Coromandel coast. He practiced some private trading, which was forbidden by company rules and in 1622 was recalled to England to answer charges which he freely admitted . He left the company and spent a number of years practicing as an independent trader but reconciled with it in 1628 when he was given the freedom of the East India Company, entitling him to become a shareholder.

While in England he was married in April 1624 to Mary Wright (d. 1652), daughter of William Wright of Sevenoaks, Kent. With her he had two sons who both became merchants.

His skill as a negotiator and linguist, he could by now also converse in Persian, the language of the Mughal court and high officials, were noted and he was appointed president of Surat in November 1633. In 1635 he negotiated the Goa Convention, a pact with the Portuguese which ceased hostilities in India and gave English ships access to Portuguese resources. Around this time he began to lobby for the acquisition of Bombay from the Portuguese as a supremely suitable trading centre on the west coast of India. The company eventually acquired it in 1668 from Charles II, to whom Bombay had been ceded in his marriage to the Portuguese princess, Catherine of Braganza as part of her dowry.

Methwold was elected deputy governor of the East India Company in 1643 and was re-elected annually thereafter until his death. Methwold negotiated the amalgamation of the East India Company's with the rival Assada Company in 1649.

Around 1640 he acquired Hale House and adjoining land in Kensington, London, as his home in England. His wife died in October 1652 and in February 1653 he married a widow, Sarah Rolfe (d. 1678?), daughter of Sir Richard Dean. Methwold himself died on 5 March 1653, at his mansion, Hale House, afterwards known as Cromwell House, Kensington, aged 63 years. He was buried, under the name Meathall, in St Mary Abbots Church, Kensington, on 10 March 1653. Cromwell House was pulled down in 1850 to form a site for the Great Exhibition. During his lifetime Methwold had also bought land in Yorkshire, Wiltshire, and Somerset, and buildings near Charing Cross.

== Works ==
- A Relation of Golconda, which appeared in the 1626 edition of Samuel Purchas's Purchas his Pilgrimage. It includes brief descriptions of the kingdoms of Arakan, Pegu, and Tenasserim.
