= Change in the Air =

2018 American drama film by Dianne Dreyer

- Film poster
- Directed by: Dianne Dreyer
- Written by: Audra Gorman
- Produced by: Benjamin Cox
- Starring: Mary Beth Hurt; Aidan Quinn; Peter Gerety; M. Emmet Walsh; Rachel Brosnahan; Satya Bhabha; Macy Gray; Olympia Dukakis
- Cinematography: Jack Donnelly
- Edited by: Ian Blume
- Music by: Terry Adams; Bill Frisell
- Production companies: Red Square Pictures; M.Y.R.A. Entertainment
- Distributed by: Screen Media Films
- Release dates: April 27, 2018 (Hill Country); October 19, 2018 (United States)
- Running time: 94 minutes
- Country: United States
- Language: English

Change in the Air is a 2018 American drama film directed by Dianne Dreyer and starring Mary Beth Hurt (in her final film role before her death in 2026), Aidan Quinn, Peter Gerety, M. Emmet Walsh, Rachel Brosnahan, Macy Gray and Olympia Dukakis.

== Cast ==
- Mary Beth Hurt as Jo Ann Bayberry
- Aidan Quinn as Moody
- Rachel Brosnahan as Wren
- Peter Gerety as Arnie Bayberry
- M. Emmet Walsh as Walter Lemke
- Macy Gray as Donna
- Olympia Dukakis as Margaret Lemke
- Satya Bhabha as Josh

== Reception ==
As of October 2021, the film holds an 11% approval rating on Rotten Tomatoes, based on nine reviews with an average rating of 3.4/10. Tara McNamara of Common Sense Media awarded the film one star out of five.
