= Parmeshwar Godrej =

Indian philanthropist and socialite

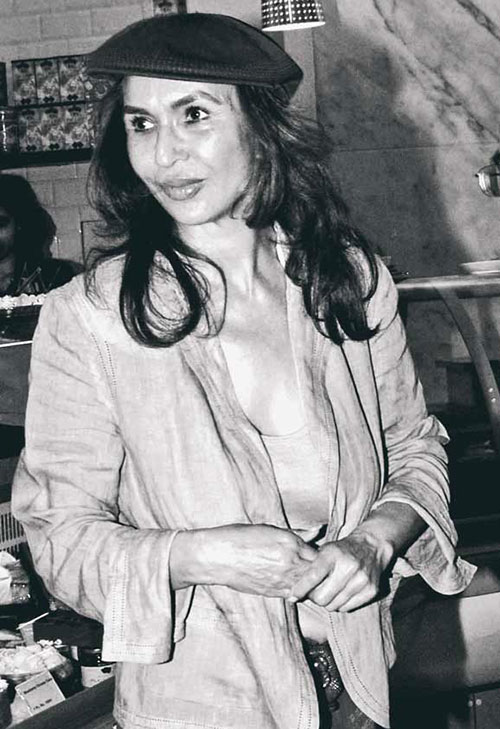
- Born: Parmeshwar Kaur; 16 July 1945
- Died: 10 October 2016 (aged 71); Breach Candy Hospital, Mumbai, Maharashtra, India
- Spouse: Adi Burjorji Godrej
- Children: Nisaba Adi Godrej; Pirojsha Adi Godrej; Tanya Arvind Dubash

Parmeshwar Godrej (16 July 1945 – 10 October 2016) was an Indian philanthropist and socialite, married to Adi Burjorji Godrej, chairman of the Godrej Group.

== Life ==
Parmeshwar was born into a Sikh family on 16 July 1945, the daughter of an army officer. She was educated at Yadavindra Public School, Patiala. Before marrying marriage to Adi Godrej, she was a hostess for Air India. They met when she was 17 and he was 21, and married in 1965. They had three children together: two daughters, Tanya Dubash and Nisa Godrej, and one son, Pirojsha Adi Godrej.

Godrej designed costumes for actress Hema Malini in the 1975 film Dharmatma at the request of her good friend Feroz Khan who was the actor, director, and producer of the same film.

Frequently described as one of India's leading socialites and philanthropists, she was a close friend of the former cricketer and Prime Minister of Pakistan Imran Khan, a relationship that often attracted media attention. She focused her influence on health issues, and was one of the earliest champions of AIDS and HIV awareness in India. She partnered with actor Richard Gere in 2004 to launch the Heroes Project, an anti-AIDS campaign, with strong support from both the Bill and Melinda Gates Foundation and Clinton Global Initiative. She also sat on the boards of the Gere Foundation and the Bill and Melinda Gates Foundation.

== Death ==
Parmeshwar Godrej died on 10 October 2016 at Breach Candy Hospital at age 71 due to a degenerative lung disease.
