= Breach Candy =

- Neighbourhood
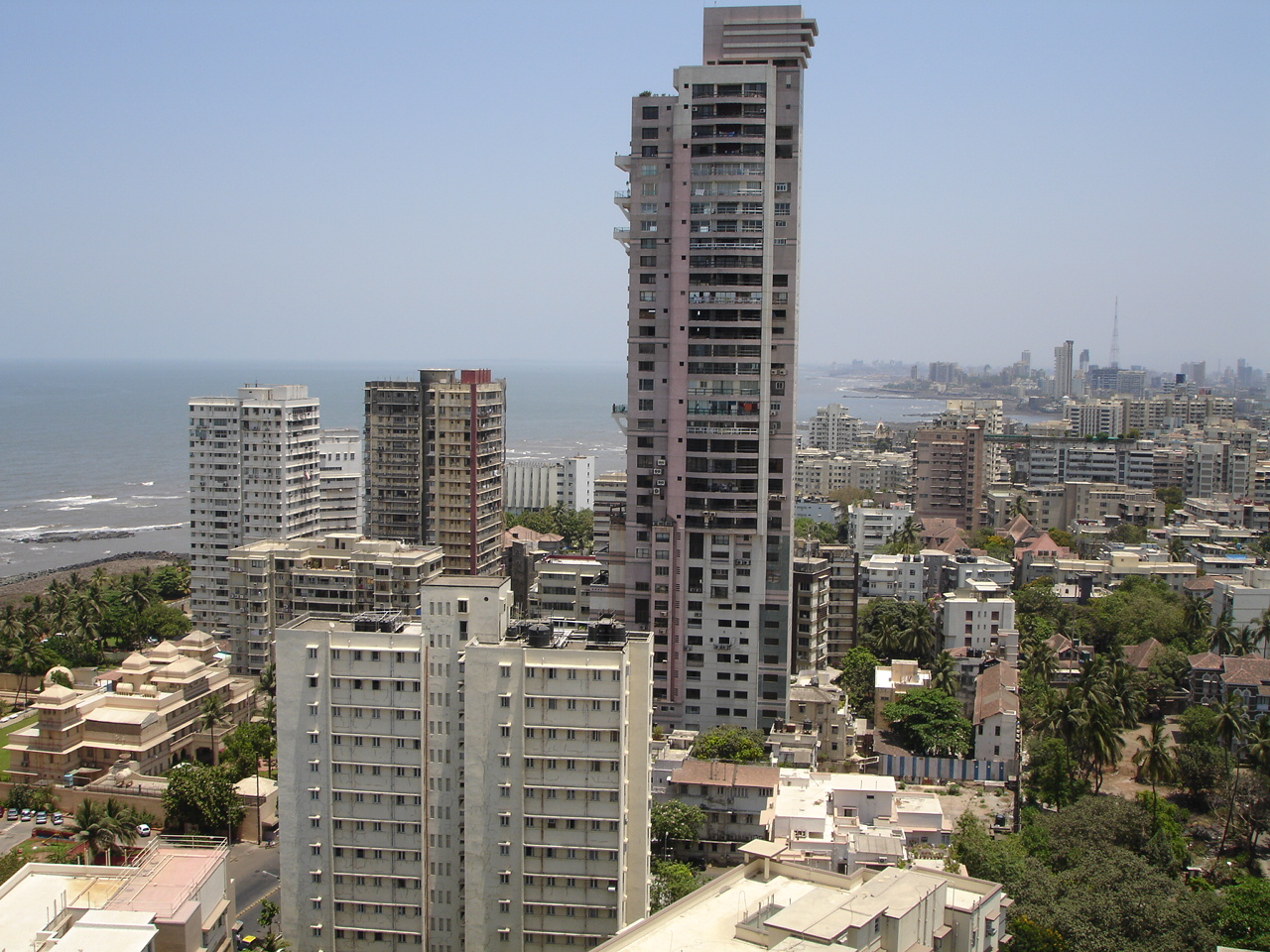

- Location in Mumbai, India Breach Candy (Maharashtra) Breach Candy (India)
- Coordinates: 18.967°N 72.805°E
- Country: India
- State: Maharashtra
- District: Mumbai City
- City: Mumbai

Government
  - Type: Municipal Corporation
  - Body: Brihanmumbai Municipal Corporation (MCGM)

Languages
  - Official: Marathi
- Time zone: UTC+5:30 (IST)
- PIN: 400026
- Area code: 022
- Vehicle registration: MH 01
- Civic agency: BMC

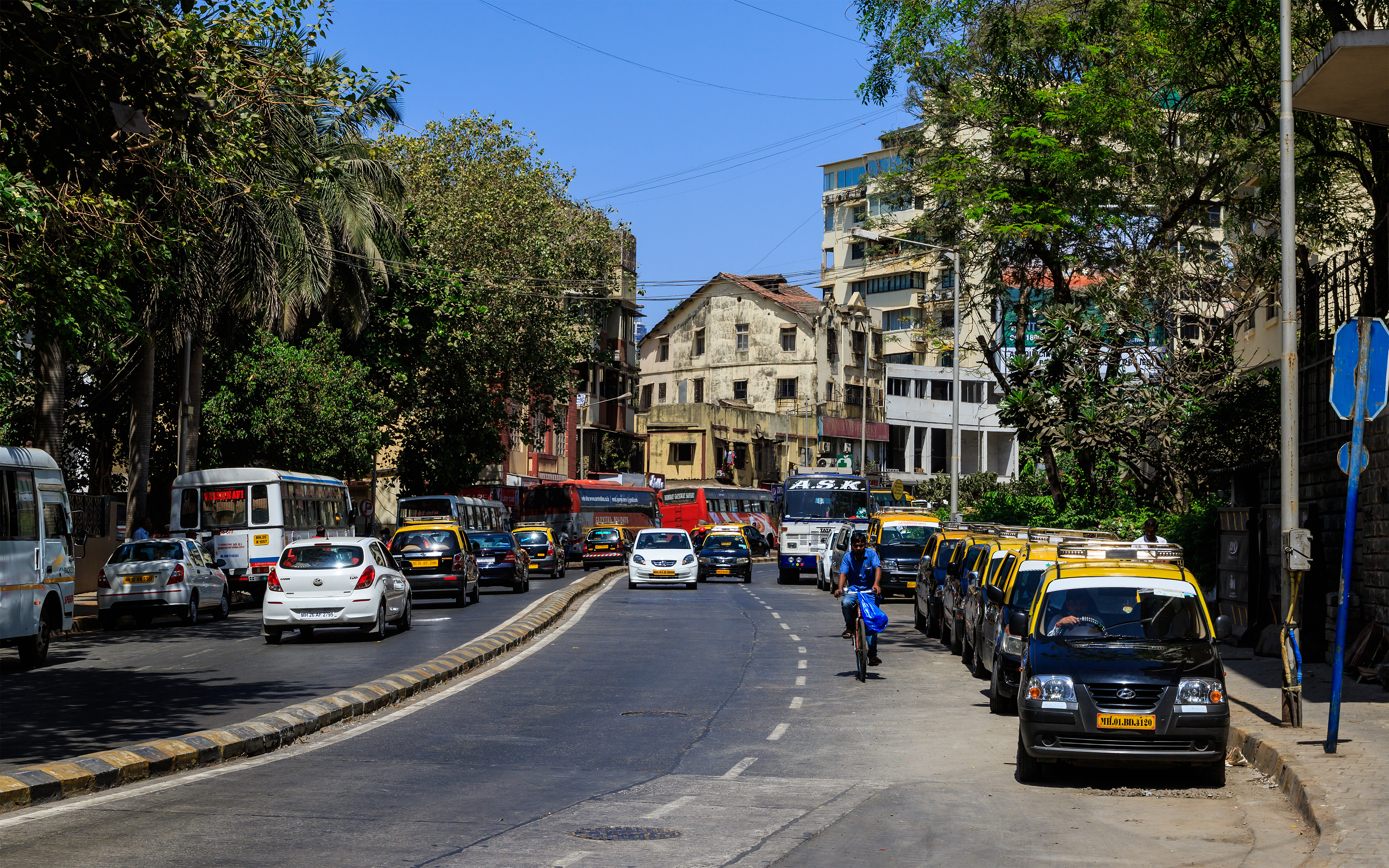
Warden Road

Bhulabhai Desai Road, also well known by the old name Warden Road (and the part at and near the swimming pool as Breach Candy), is a niche up-market residential and semi-commercial locality of South Mumbai.

The area has many famous landmarks beside its long and winding stretch, from the Breach Candy Hospital to the Amarsons and Tata gardens and Lincoln House, former location of the Consulate General of the United States, Mumbai. The elite Breach Candy Club in the neighbourhood features the country's largest India-shaped swimming pool. Just off Bhulabhai Desai Road is the women-only Sophia College.

The 18th century Mahalaxmi Temple, which honors the Hindu goddess of wealth and wisdom, is situated nearby on the edge of sea. It is one of the most famous temples of Mumbai and attracts millions of devotees and tourists each year.

The area falls under the 'D-Ward' of the BMC and shares the postal code 400 026 under the Cumballa Hill post office. It lies 21 kilometers south of Chhatrapati Shivaji International Airport and just 2 kilometers from the Mumbai Central station. It is well connected by local buses run by BEST.

Geographically, this road curls around the Arabian Sea. Because of its picturesque location, real estate prices here are among the most expensive in the country.

== Etymology ==
The origin of the name Breach Candy, first attested by 1828 at least, is widely given as an Anglicisation of an Arabic-Marathi name Burj-khāḍī ('the tower of the creek'). However, this interpretation is disputed. In seventeenth- to nineteenth-century English, breach had meanings including 'the breaking of waves on a coast', 'surf made by the sea breaking over rocks; broken water, breakers' and 'a break in a coast, a bay, harbour', and may in the context of Breach Candy even have been used to refer to a breakwater at the location. Thus, although the breach part of the name could be an Anglicisation of a local word, it could simply be an English word in its own right. Meanwhile, Candy may be an Anglicisation of Marathi khind ('mountain pass') or Kannada khindi ('a breach').

The changing environs of Breach Candy
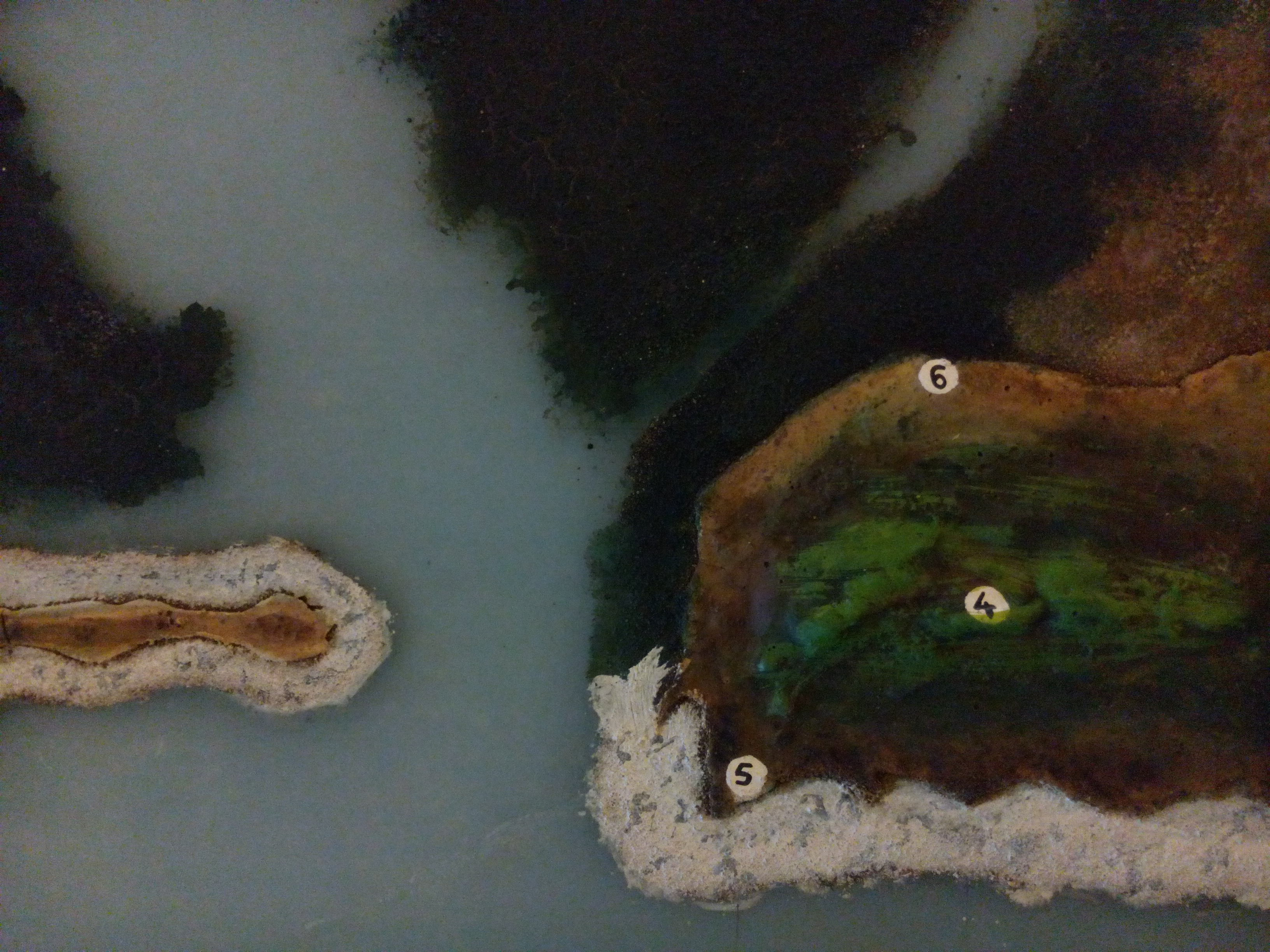
Diorama of Breach Candy area of pre-Colonial islands of Bombay (right) and Worli (left). 5 marks the shrine of Mahalaxmi, Mahasaraswati, and Mahakali. What is now Breach Candy is largely sea.

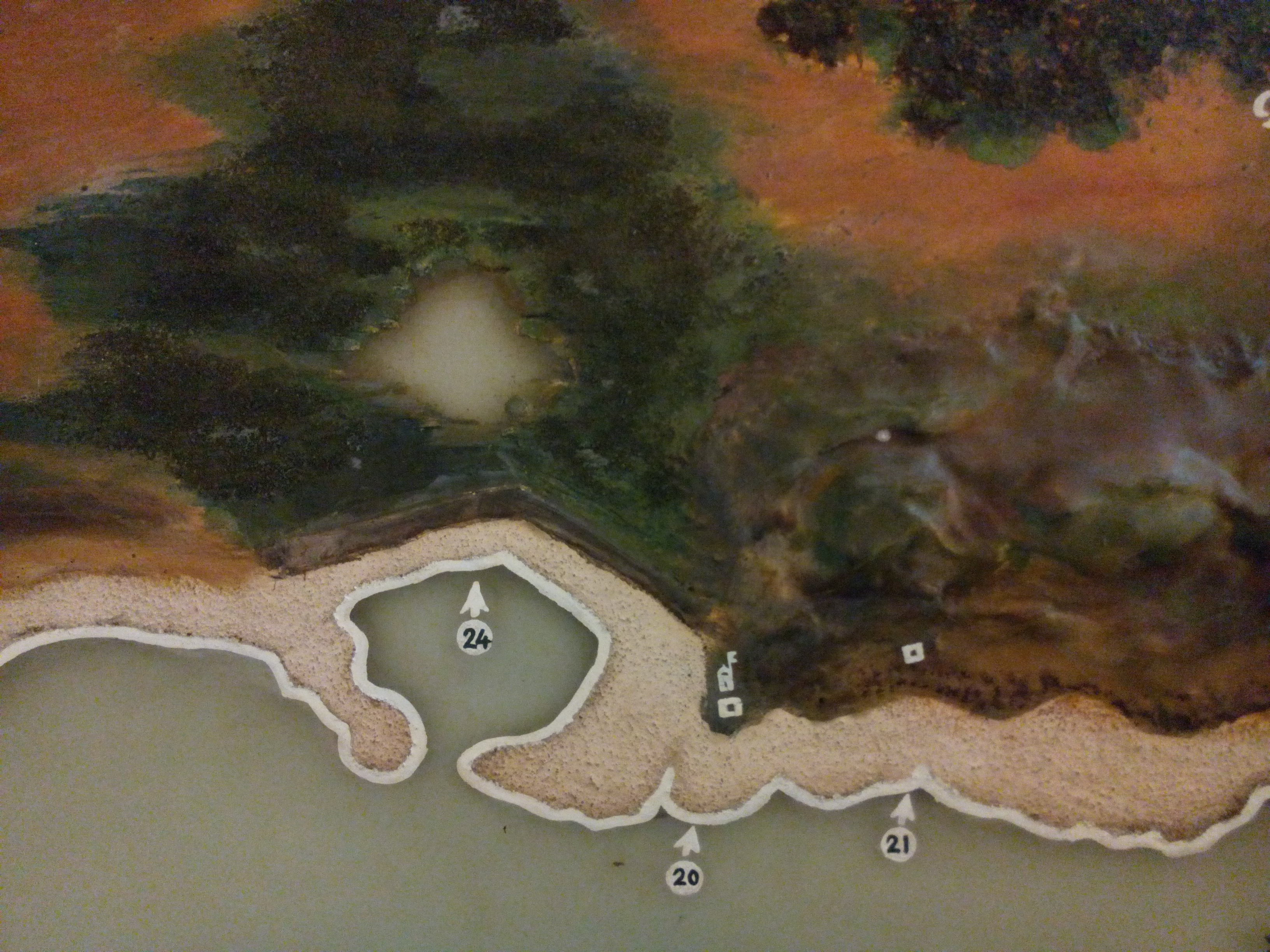
Diorama of Breach Candy area of eighteenth-century Bombay, marking Mahalxmi Temple (20) and showing the island of Bombay joining the island of Worli (24).

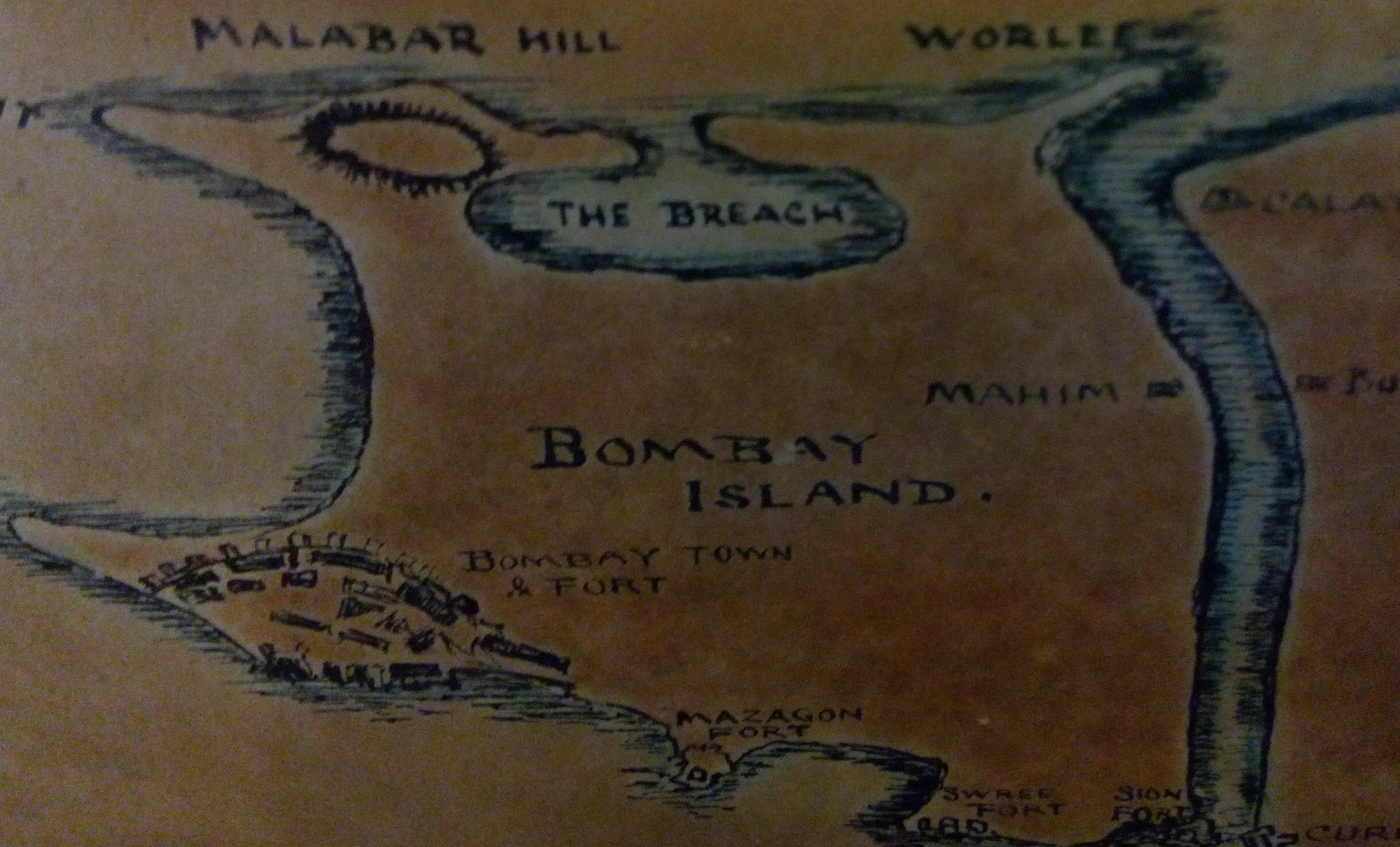
'Map of the Port and Island of Bombay with the Adjacent Island', 1724, naming the recently formed bay as 'the Breach'.

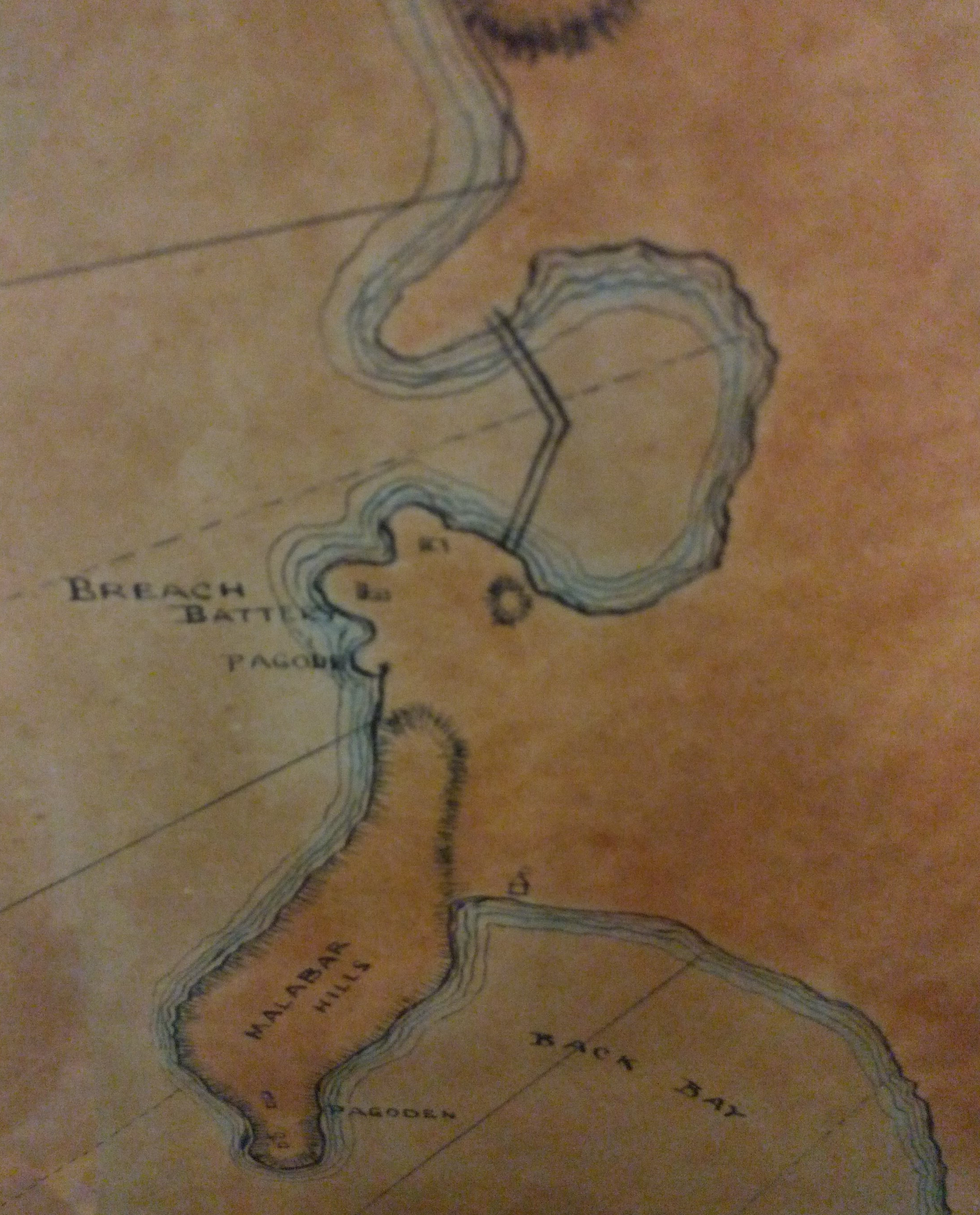
'Niebuhr's Map of Bombay', 1764, showing the sea-wall or 'Vellard', and the 'Breach battery'.

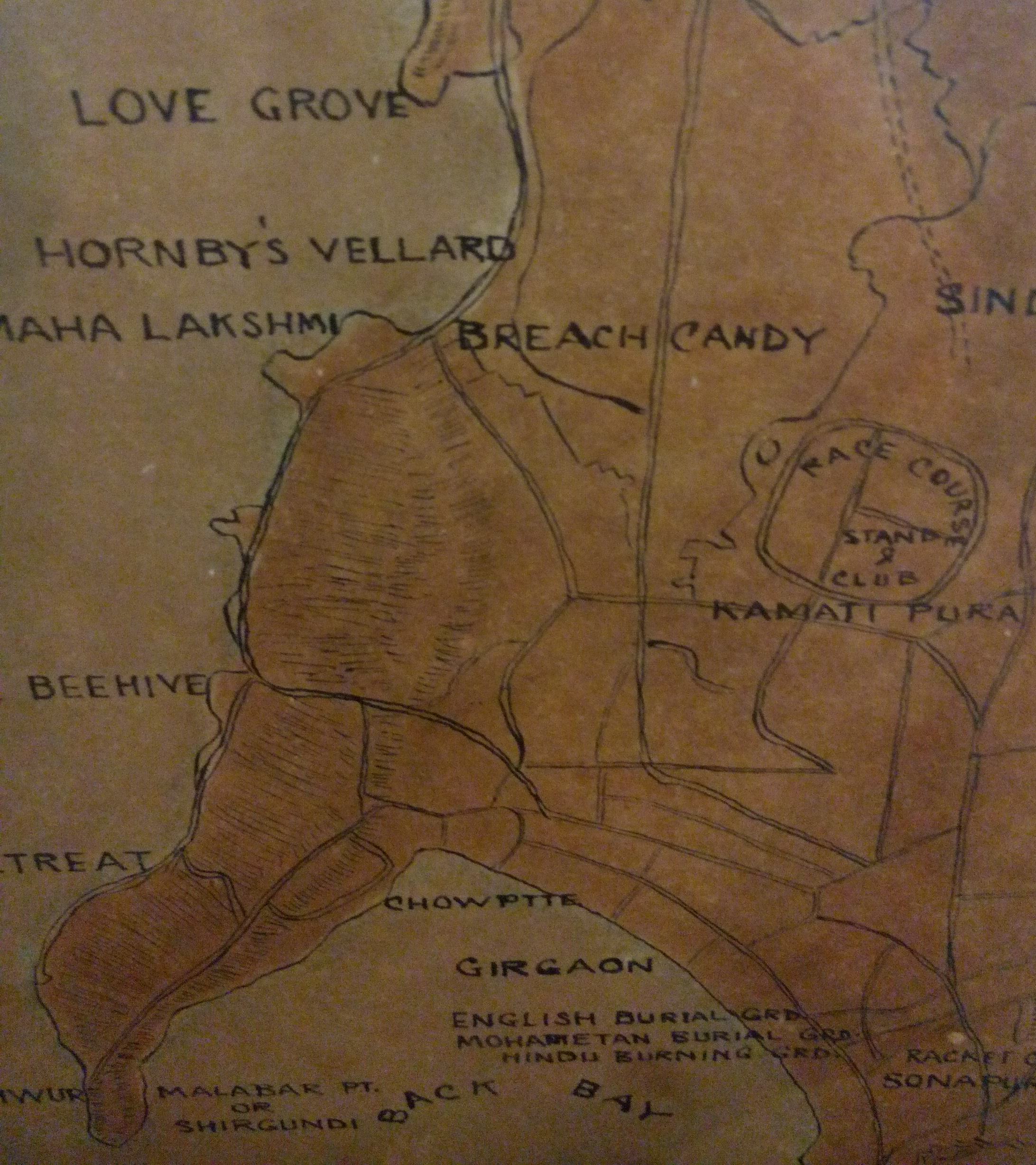
'The Island of Bombay' by Captain Thomas Dickinson, 1812-16, showing the reclamation of land behind the sea-wall or 'Vellard', and marking the Mahalaxmi Temple.

== History ==
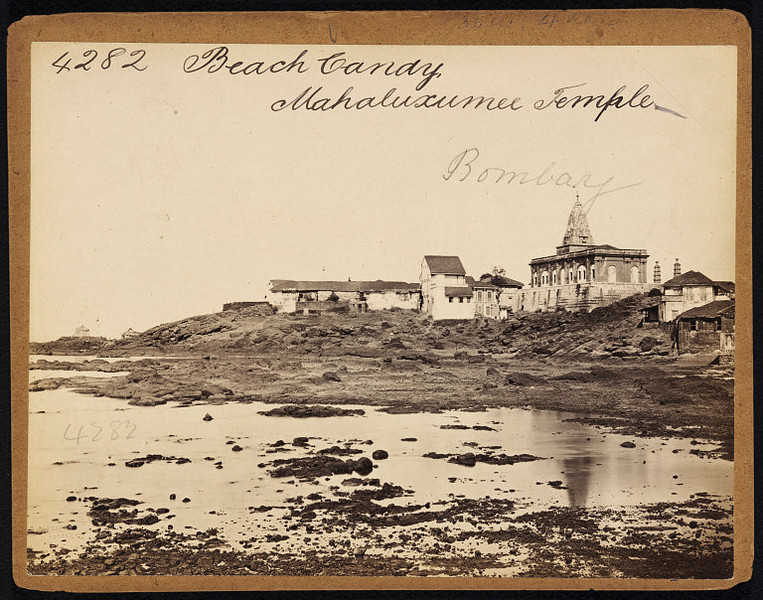
The oldest temple Thakleshwar Mahadev Mandir near Mahalakshmi Temple at Breach Candy, Bombay by Francis Frith (between 1850 and 1879)

Not long ago, Breach Candy was sparsely populated with very few bungalows and mansions. Most of the residents were born into old money. Some of these bungalows and mansions still stand. The Breach Candy House, the Breach Candy Swimming Club and the Breach Candy Hospital have been present since the time of British rule.

At the northern foot of the Cumballa Hill, in the part now called Breach Candy, was a temple to three goddesses—Mahakali, Mahalakshmi and Mahasaraswati. A creek to the north separated the island of Bombay from the Koli island of Worli. This creek was filled after the completion of the Hornby Vellard in 1784. Soon after, the modern temple of Mahalakshmi was built here.

What are now the Amarson and Tata gardens were landfills with abandoned construction trucks, cranes and bulldozers probably used in land reclamation projects. A few of these trucks were parked in a truck-sized garage behind Scandal Point. Similarly, trucks, cranes and bulldozers were seen abandoned on the land which is now known as Priyadarshini Park.

== Notable residents ==
- Kailash Surendranath, film director
- RK Laxman, Cartoonist
- Asha Bhosle, Singer
- Ronnie Screwvala, producer and CEO and founding chairman of UTV Group
- Annapurna Devi, notable Indian classical musician and former wife of Pandit Ravi Shankar
- Homi Adajania, Filmmaker
- Kunal KD Desai, Vigilante
- Bhanu Athaiya, Oscar-winning costume designer for Gandhi
- Naina Lal Kidwai, businesswoman
- Gautam Singhania, businessman
- Jagjit Singh, classical singer
- Aarti Chhabria, actress
- Salman Rushdie, author. Born and raised in Breach Candy, he describes the area as it was from Indian independence to the 1960s in Midnight's Children.
- Azim Premji, chairman and CEO of Wipro Technologies
- Shibani Bathija, screenwriter
- Supriya Sule, politician
- Tara Sharma, actress
- Partap Sharma, author and playwright
- Alyque Padamsee, theatre producer and actor
- Ramesh Balsekar, Advaita Vendanta master
- Kishore Kumar, Singer
- Lata Mangeshkar, Singer
- Poonawala Family, Industrialists
- Dubash Family, notable business family
- Bangur Family, Industrialists
- Jaimin Shah, Diamond Merchant
- Mofatraj Munot, Owner of Kalpatru
- Yusuf Hamied, Owner of Cipla

== Education ==
- Green Lawns High School
- Activity High School
- Sophia College
- DSB International School (German school) Garden Campus

== Picture links ==
- Gordon Gibbons Photographs of Breach Candy 1937-1940
