= Homi K. Bhabha =

Indian critical theorist (born 1949)

Homi K. Bhabha FBA FRSL
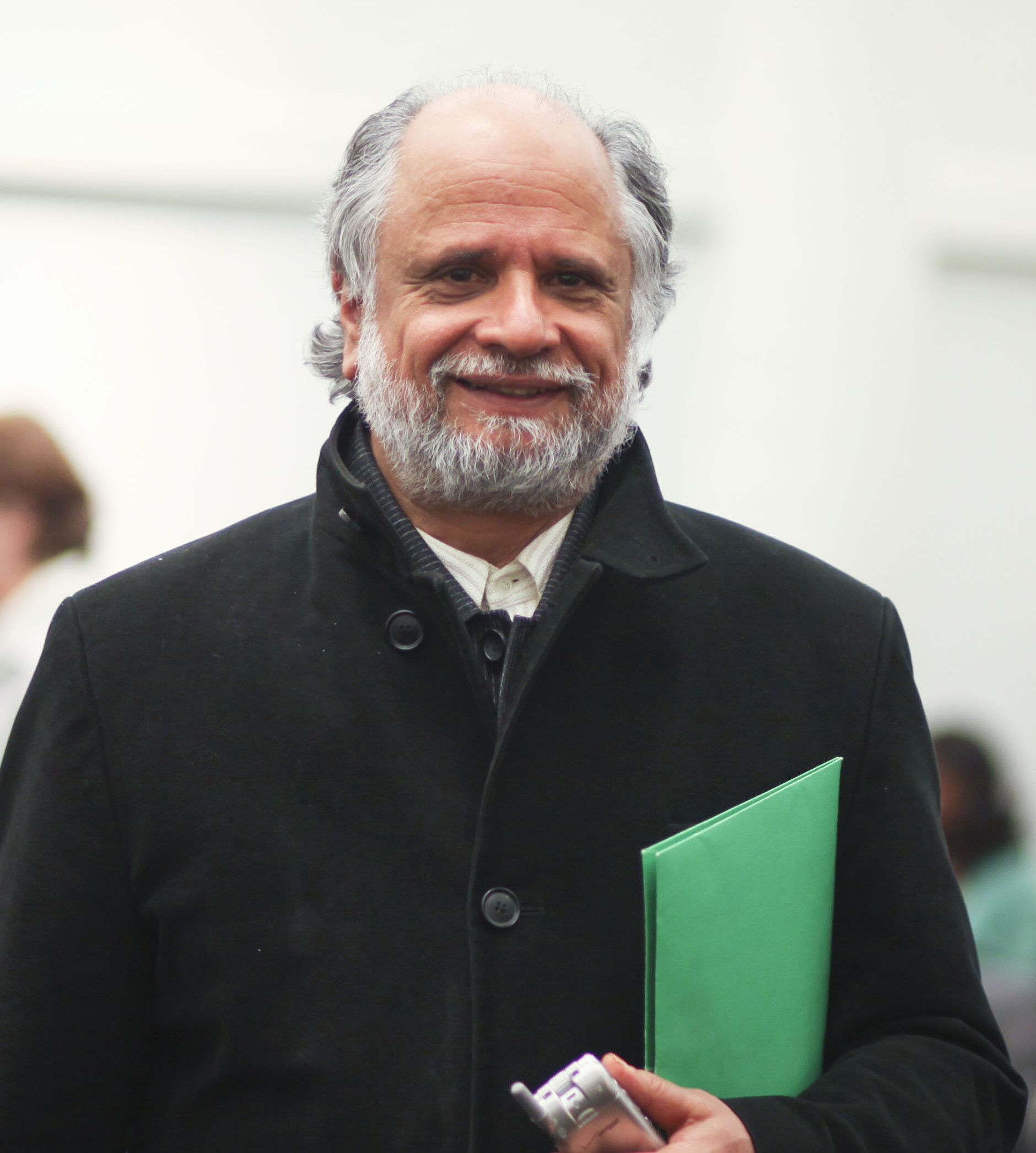
- Born: Homi Kharshedji Bhabha; 1 November 1949 (age 77); Bombay, Province of Bombay, Dominion of India
- Spouse: Jacqueline Bhabha
- Children: 3, including Satya Bhabha

Academic background
- Education: University of Mumbai (BA); Christ Church, Oxford (MA, MPhil, DPhil)

Academic work
- School or tradition: Post-colonial theory Post-structuralism
- Institutions: University of Sussex; Princeton University; Harvard University
- Main interests: History of ideas, literary theory
- Notable ideas: Hybridity as a strategy of the suppressed against their suppressors, mimicry as a strategy of colonial subjection, Third Space, postcolonial "enunciative" present

Homi Kharshedji Bhabha FBA FRSL (/ˈbɑːbɑː/; born 1 November 1949) is an Indian scholar and critical theorist. He is the Anne F. Rothenberg Professor of the Humanities at Harvard University. He is one of the most important figures in contemporary postcolonial studies, and has developed a number of the field's neologisms and key concepts, such as hybridity, mimicry, difference, and ambivalence. Such terms describe ways in which colonised people have resisted the power of the coloniser, according to Bhabha's theory. In 2012, he received the Padma Bhushan award in the field of literature and education from the Indian government. He is married to attorney and Harvard lecturer Jacqueline Bhabha; they have three children.

== Biography ==
=== Early life and education ===
Homi Bhabha was born in Bombay, Dominion of India (now Mumbai, India), into a Parsi family. He graduated with a BA degree from Elphinstone College at the University of Mumbai before going up to Christ Church, Oxford, where he read for his MA, MPhil and DPhil degrees in English Literature.

=== Career ===
After lecturing in the Department of English at the University of Sussex for more than ten years, Bhabha received a senior fellowship at Princeton University where he was also made Old Dominion Visiting Professor. He was Steinberg Visiting Professor at the University of Pennsylvania where he delivered the Richard Wright Lecture Series. At Dartmouth College, Bhabha was a faculty fellow at the School of Criticism and Theory. From 1997 to 2001, he served as Chester D. Tripp Professor in the Humanities at the University of Chicago. In 2001–2, he served as a distinguished visiting professor at University College, London. He has been the Anne F. Rothenberg Professor of English and American Literature and Language at Harvard University since 2001. Bhabha also serves on the Editorial Collective of Public Culture, an academic journal published by Duke University Press.

== Thought ==
=== Hybridity ===
One of his central ideas is that of "hybridisation," which, taking up from Edward Said's work, describes the emergence of new cultural forms from multiculturalism. Instead of seeing colonialism as something locked in the past, Bhabha shows how its histories and cultures constantly intrude on the present, demanding that we transform our understanding of cross-cultural relations. His work transformed the study of colonialism by applying post-structuralist methodologies to colonial texts.

=== Ambivalence ===
The idea of ambivalence sees culture as consisting of opposing perceptions and dimensions. Bhabha claims that this ambivalence—this duality that presents a split in the identity of the colonized other—allows for beings who are a hybrid of their own cultural identity and the colonizer's cultural identity. Ambivalence contributes to the reason why colonial power is characterized by its belatedness. Colonial signifiers of authority only acquire their meanings after the "traumatic scenario of colonial difference, cultural or racial, returns the eye of power to some prior archaic image or identity. Paradoxically, however, such an image can neither be 'original'—by virtue of the act of repetition that constructs it—nor identical—by virtue of the difference that defines it." Accordingly, the colonial presence remains ambivalent, split between its appearance as original and authoritative and its articulation as repetition and difference. This opens up the two dimensions of colonial discourse: that which is characterized by invention and mastery and that of displacement and fantasy.

=== Cultural difference, enunciation, and stereotype ===
Bhabha presents cultural difference as an alternative to cultural diversity. In cultural diversity, a culture is an "object of empirical knowledge" and pre-exists the knower while cultural difference sees culture as the point at which two or more cultures meet and it is also where most problems occur, discursively constructed rather than pre-given, a "process of enunciation of culture as 'knowledgeable.'" Enunciation is the act of utterance or expression of a culture that takes place in the Third Space. Since culture is never pre-given, it must be uttered. It is through enunciation that cultural difference is discovered and recognized. The enunciative process introduces a divide between the traditions of a stable system of reference and the negation of the certitude of culture in the articulation of new cultural, meanings, strategies, in the political present, as a practice of domination, or resistance.

Consequently, cultural difference is a process of identification, while cultural diversity is comparative and categorized. Moreover, it is that possibility of difference and articulation that could free the signifier of skin/culture from the fixations of racial typology, however, the stereotype impedes the circulation and articulation of the signifier of "race" as anything other than that. An important aspect of colonial and post-colonial discourse is their dependence on the concept of "fixity" in the construction of otherness. Fixity implies repetition, rigidity and an unchanging order as well as disorder. The stereotype depends on this notion of fixity. The stereotype creates an "identity" that stems as much from mastery and pleasure as it does from anxiety and defense of the dominant, "for it is a form of multiple and contradictory beliefs in its recognition of difference and disavowal of it."

=== Mimicry ===
Like Bhabha's concept of hybridity, mimicry is a metonym of presence. Mimicry appears when members of a colonized society imitate and take on the culture of the colonizers. Jacques Lacan asserts, "The effect of mimicry is camouflage...it is not a question of harmonizing with the background, but against a mottled background, of becoming mottled." Colonial mimicry comes from the colonist's desire for a reformed, recognizable Other, as a subject of a difference that is, as Bhabha writes, "almost the same, but not quite." Thus, mimicry is a sign of a double articulation; a strategy which appropriates the Other as it visualizes power. Furthermore, mimicry is the sign of the inappropriate, "a difference or recalcitrance which coheres the dominant strategic function of colonial power, intensifies surveillance, and poses an imminent threat to both 'normalized' knowledges and disciplinary powers."

In this way, mimicry gives the colonial subject a partial presence, as if the 'colonial' is dependent for its representation within the authoritative discourse itself. Ironically, the colonists desire to emerge as 'authentic' through mimicry—through a process of writing and repetition—through this partial representation. On the other hand, Bhabha does not interpret mimicry as a narcissistic identification of the colonizer in which the colonized stops being a person without the colonizer present in his identity. He sees mimicry as a "double vision which in disclosing the ambivalence of colonial discourse also disrupts its authority. And it is a double vision that is a result of what [he has] described as the partial representation/recognition of the colonial object...the figures of a doubling, the part-objects of a metonymy of colonial desire which alienates the modality and normality of those dominate discourses in which they emerge as 'inappropriate colonial subjects'."

The colonized's desire is inverted as the colonial appropriation now produces a partial vision of the colonizer's presence; a gaze from the Other is the counterpart to the colonizer's gaze that shares the insight of genealogical gaze which frees the marginalized individual and breaks the unity of man's being through which he had extended his sovereignty. Thus, "the observer becomes the observed and 'partial' representation rearticulates the whole notion of identity and alienates it from essence."

=== Third Space ===
The Third Space acts as an ambiguous area that develops when two or more individuals/cultures interact (compare this to urbanist Edward W. Soja's conceptualization of thirdspace). It "challenges our sense of the historical identity of culture as a homogenizing, unifying force, authenticated by the originary past, kept alive in the national tradition of the People." This ambivalent area of discourse, which serves as a site for the discursive conditions of enunciation, "displaces the narrative of the Western written in homogeneous, serial time." It does so through the "disruptive temporality of enunciation." Bhabha claims that "cultural statements and systems are constructed in this contradictory and ambivalent space of enunciation." As a result, the hierarchical claims to the innate originality or purity of cultures are invalid. Enunciation implies that culture has no fixity and even the same signs can be appropriated, translated, rehistoricized, and read anew.

=== Influences ===
Bhabha's work in postcolonial theory owes much to post-structuralism. Notable among Bhabha's influences include Jacques Derrida and deconstruction; Jacques Lacan and Lacanian psychoanalysis; and Michel Foucault's notion of discursivity. Additionally, in a 1995 interview with W. J. T. Mitchell, Bhabha stated that Edward Said is the writer who has most influenced him. In the social sciences, Edward W. Soja has most thoroughly relied on and transformed Bhabha's approaches to understanding notion of space, action, and representation.

== Reception ==
=== Criticism ===
Bhabha has been criticized for using indecipherable jargon and dense prose. In 1998, the journal Philosophy and Literature awarded Bhabha second prize in its "Bad Writing Competition," which "celebrates bad writing from the most stylistically lamentable passages found in scholarly books and articles." Bhabha was awarded the prize for a sentence in The Location of Culture (Routledge, 1994):

If, for a while, the ruse of desire is calculable for the uses of discipline soon the repetition of guilt, justification, pseudo-scientific theories, superstition, spurious authorities, and classifications can be seen as the desperate effort to "normalize" formally the disturbance of a discourse of splitting that violates the rational, enlightened claims of its enunciatory modality.

Professor Emeritus of English at Stanford University Marjorie Perloff said that her reaction to Bhabha's appointment to the Harvard faculty was one of "dismay," telling The New York Times that "He doesn't have anything to say." Mark Crispin Miller, a professor of media studies at New York University, remarked on Bhabha's writing: "One could finally argue that there is no meaning there, beyond the neologisms and Latinate buzzwords. Most of the time I don't know what he's talking about."

In a 2005 interview, Bhabha expressed his annoyance at such criticisms and the implied expectation that philosophers should use the "common language of the common person," while scientists are given a pass for the similar use of language that is not immediately comprehensible to casual readers. In his review entitled "Goodbye to the Enlightenment," Terry Eagleton provided a more substantive critique of Bhabha's work, explaining in The Guardian (8 February 1994) that "Bhabha's aim is to put the skids under every cherished doctrine of Western Enlightenment, from the idea of progress to the unity of the self, from the classical work of art to the notions of law and civility." Bhabha uses India, for instance, as an example of alternative possibilities when he argues that the very idea and practice of secularism is changing.

=== Controversies ===
In February 2022, Bhabha was one of 38 Harvard faculty to sign a letter to The Harvard Crimson defending the professor John Comaroff, who had been found to have violated the university's sexual and professional conduct policies. The letter defended Comaroff as "an excellent colleague, advisor and committed university citizen" and expressed dismay over his being sanctioned by the university. After students filed a lawsuit with detailed allegations of Comaroff's actions and the university's failure to respond, Bhabha was one of several signatories to say that he wished to retract his signature.

=== Honors ===
Bhabha served on the Humanities jury for the Infosys Prize for three years. He was awarded the Padma Bhushan award by the Government of India in 2012. Bhabha was elected a Fellow of the British Academy in 2020; becoming a Fellow of the Royal Society of Literature in 2021.

== Personal life ==
He is married to attorney and Harvard lecturer Jacqueline Bhabha. The couple have three children together named Leah Bhabha, Ishan Bhabha, and Satya Bhabha. Bhabha is famous for hosting dinner parties. He also prefers to cook meat with bones; he told one reporter, "It's the bones that make a dish. I always use the bone, never without.”

== Works ==
=== Books ===
==== Edited books and art exhibition catalogues ====
- Nation and Narration, Routledge (1990; ISBN 0415014824)
- Negotiating Rapture: The Power of Art to Transform Lives, Museum of Contemporary Art (1996; ISBN 9780933856400)
- Edward Said: Continuing the Conversation, co-ed. with W. J. T. Mitchell (originally an issue of Critical Inquiry), University of Chicago Press (2004; ISBN 0226532038).
- Without Boundary: Seventeen Ways of Looking, with Fereshteh Daftari and Orhan Pamuk, The Museum of Modern Art (2006; ISBN 9780870700859).
- Anish Kapoor, Flammarion (2011; ISBN 9782080200839)
- Midnight to the Boom: Painting in India After Independence, Peabody Essex Museum (2013; ISBN 9780500238936)
- Matthew Barney: River of Fundament, Okwui Enwezor, Hilton Als, Diedrich Diederichsen, David Walsh, Skira (2014; ISBN 9780847842582)

==== Essay collection ====
- The Location of Culture, Routledge (1994; ISBN 0415336392)

=== Articles ===
- "Apologies for Poetry: A Study in the Method of Mill and Richards". Journal of the School of Languages [New Delhi] 3.1 (1975): 71–88.
- "Parthasarathy, R. "Indo-Anglican attitudes". TLS (The Times Literary Supplement) 3 (1978): 136.
- "The Other Question…." Screen (November—December 1983), 24(6), 18–36.
- "Representation and the colonial text: a critical exploration of some forms of mimeticism". In Frank Gloversmith (ed.), The Theory of Reading. Brighton, Sussex: Harvester Press, 1984.
- "Remembering Fanon". Introduction to the English edition of Black Skin, White Masks. London: Pluto Press, 1986.
- "'What does the Black man want?'" New Formations 1 (1987): 118–130.
- "Remembering Fanon: self, psyche, and the colonial condition". In Barbara Kruger and Phil Mariani (eds), Remaking History. Seattle: Bay Press, 1989.
- "Hybridité, identité et culture contemporaine". In Jean Hubert Martin (ed.), Magiciens de la terre. Paris: Editions du Centre Pompidou, 1989.
- "At the limits". Artforum 27.9 (1989): 11–12.
- "Imaginings". New statesman & Society 2.70 (1989): 45–47.
- "Articulating the archaic: notes on colonial nonsense". In Peter Collier and Helga Geyer-Ryan (eds), Literary Theory Today. Ithaca, N.Y.: Cornell University Press, 1990.
- "The other question: difference, discrimination and the discourse of colonialism". In Russell (ed.), Out there: marginalization and contemporary cultures. New York: New Museum of Contemporary Art, 1990.
- "Interrogating identity: the postcolonial prerogative". In David Theo Goldberg (ed.), Anatomy of Racism. Minneapolis: University of Minnesota Press, 1990.
- "DissemiNation: time, narrative, and the margins of the modern nation". In Homi K. Bhabha (ed.), Nation and Narration. London; New York: Routledge, 1990.
- "Novel metropolis". New Statesman & Society 3.88 (1990): 16.
- "A question of survival: nations and psychic states". In James Donald (ed.), Psychoanalysis and Cultural Theory: Thresholds. New York: St. Martin's Press, 1991.
- "Art and National Identity: A Critics' Symposium". Art in America 79.9 (1991): 80-.
- "'Race', time and the revision of modernity". The Oxford Literary Review 13.1-2 (1991): 193–219.
- "Postcolonial criticism". In Stephen Greenblatt and Giles B. Gunn (eds), Redrawing the Boundaries: the transformation of English and American literary studies. New York: Modern Language Association of America, 1992.
- "Of mimicry and man: the ambivalence of colonial discourse". In Philip; Waugh, Rice, Patricia (eds), Modern Literary Theory: a reader. 2nd edn, London; New York: E. Arnold, 1992.
- "A good judge of character: men, metaphors, and the common culture". In Toni Morrison (ed.), Race-ing Justice, En-gendering Power: Essays on Anita Hill, Clarence Thomas, and the construction of social reality. New York: Pantheon Books, 1992.
- "Postcolonial authority and postmodern guilt". In Lawrence Grossberg, Cary Nelson, and Paula A. Treichler (eds), Cultural Studies. New York: Routledge, 1992.
- "Double visions". Artforum 30.5 (1992): 85–59.
- "Freedom's basis in the indeterminate". October 61 (1992): 46–57.
- "The world and the home". Social Text 10.2-3 (1992): 141–153.
- "Beyond the pale: art in the age of multicultural translation". In Ria Lavrijsen (ed.), Cultural Diversity in the Arts: art, art policies and the facelift of Europe. Amsterdam: Royal Tropical Institute, 1993.
- "Culture's in between". Artforum 32.1 (1993): 167–170.
- "A Good Judge of Character: Men, Metaphors, and the Common Culture". In Toni Morrison (ed.), Race-ing Justice, En-gendering Power: Essays on Anita Hill, Clarence Thomas, and the Construction of Social Reality. Pantheon Books (1992; ISBN 9780679741459).
- "In a Spirit of Calm Violence". In Gyan Prakash (ed.), After Colonialism: Imperial Histories and Postcolonial Displacements, Princeton University Press (1994; ISBN 9781400821440).
- "The commitment to theory". In Jim Pines and Paul Willemen (eds), Questions of Third Cinema. London: BFI Pub., 1994.
- "Frontlines / borderposts". In Angelika Bammer (ed.), Displacements: cultural identities in question. Bloomington: Indiana University Press: Indiana University Press, 1994.
- "Remembering Fanon: self, psyche and the colonial condition". In R. J. Patrick Williams and Laura Chrisman.(eds), Colonial Discourse and Post-colonial Theory: a reader. New York: Columbia University Press, 1994.
- "The enchantment of art". In Kathy Becker, Carol Acker, and Ann Wiens (eds), The Artist in Society: rights, roles, and responsibilities. Chicago: Chicago New Art Association, New Art Examiner Press, 1995.
- "Are you a man or a mouse?" In Maurice Berger, Brian Wallis, Simon Watson, and Carrie Weems (eds), Constructing Masculinity. New York: Routledge, 1995.
- "Homi Bhabha on the New Black Intellectual". Artforum international 34.2 (1995): 16–17.
- "Dance this diss around". Artforum 33.8 (1995): 19–20.
- "[Dialogues with Homi Bhabha, et al.]." The Fact of Blackness: Frantz Fanon and visual representation. Ed. Alan Read. Seattle: Bay Press, 1996.
- "Postmodernism/postcolonialism". In Robert S. Nelson and Richard Shiff (eds), Critical terms for art history. Chicago: University of Chicago Press, 1996.
- "Unpacking my library ... again". In Iain Chambers and Lidia Curti (eds), The post-colonial question: common skies, divided horizons. London; New York: Routledge, 1996.
- "Day by day . . . with Frantz Fanon". In Alan Read (ed.), The Fact of Blackness. Seattle: Bay Press, 1996.
- "Laughing stock". Artforum 35.2 (1996): 15–17.
- "Unsatisfied: notes on vernacular cosmopolitanism". In Laura Garcia-Moreno and Peter C. Pfeiffer (eds), Text and Nation: Cross-Disciplinary Essays on Cultural and National Identities. Columbia, SC: Camden House, 1996. 191–207.
- "World and the home". In Anne McClintock, Aamir Mufti, and Ella Shohat (eds), Dangerous liaisons: gender, nation, and postcolonial perspectives, Minneapolis: University of Minnesota Press, 1997.
- "Postscript: bombs away in front-line suburbia". In Roger Silverstone (ed.), Visions of Suburbia. London; New York: Routledge, 1997.
- "Designer creations". Artforum 36.4 (1997): 11–14.
- "[Reviews of: Colonialism and its Forms of Knowledge: The British in India; and Subaltern Studies, vol. 9, Writings on South Asian History and Society]". TLS (The Times Literary Supplement). 4923 (1997): 14–15.
- "Halfway house". Artforum 35.9 (1997): 11–13.
- "Queen's English". Artforum 35.7 (1997): 25–27.
- "Front lines / border posts". Critical inquiry 23.3 (1997).
- "Dance this diss around". In Maurice Berger (ed.), The Crisis of Criticism. New York: New Press, 1998.
- "The white stuff." Artforum 36.9 (1998): 21–23.
- "On the irremovable strangeness of being different [one of "Four views of ethnicity"]." PMLA 113.1 (1998): 34–39.
- "Liberalism's sacred cow". In Susan Moller Okin and Joshua Cohen (eds), Is Multiculturalism Bad for Women? Princeton, N.J: Princeton University Press, 1999.
- (interviewer). "Alter/Native Modernities - Miniaturizing Modernity: Shahzia Sikander in Conversation with Homi K Bhabha". Public culture: Bulletin of the Project for Transnational Cultural Studies 11.1 (1999): 146–152.
- "Afterword: an ironic act of courage". In Rajan Balachandra and Elizabeth Sauer (eds), Milton and the Imperial Vision. Pittsburgh, Pa: Duquesne University Press, 1999.
- Foreword to Laura Marcus and Bryan Cheyette (eds), Modernity, Culture, and The Jew, Wiley (1998; ISBN 9780745620411).
- "Conversational Art". In Mary Jane Jacob and Michael Brenson (eds), Conversations at the Castle: Changing Audiences and Contemporary Art, The MIT Press (1998; ISBN 9780262100724).
- "Cosmopolitanisms", in Cosmopolitanism, co-ed. with Sheldon I. Pollock, Carol Breckenridge, Arjun Appadurai, and Dipesh Chakrabarty, (originally an issue of Public Culture), Duke University Press (2002; ISBN 9780822328995).
- "On Cultural Choice", 2000.
- "V.S. Naipaul", 2001
- "Democracy De-Realized", 2002.
- "On Writing Rights", 2003.
- "Making Difference: The Legacy of the Culture Wars", Artforum 2003 (4).
- "Adagio," 2004.
- "Still Life," 2004.
- Foreword to The Wretched of the Earth by Frantz Fanon, transl. Richard Philcox, 2004.
- "Framing Fanon", 2005.
- "The Black Savant and the Dark Princess", 2006.
- Our Neighbours, Ourselves: Contemporary Reflections on Survival, Walter de Gruyter (2011; ISBN 9783110262445), part of the Hegel Lectures at Dahlem Humanities Center, 20p

==== Translations ====
- [Dudiker, Karsten (trans.)] "'Angst' in kultureller Ubersetzung". Heterotopien der Identitat: Literatur in interamerikanischen Kontaktzonen. Ed. Hermann Herlinghaus; Utz Riese. Heidelberg, Germany: Carl Winter Universitatsverlag, 1999. 83–97.

==== Interviews ====
- Koundoura, Maria; Rai, Amit. "Interview: Homi Bhabha." Stanford humanities review 3.1 (1993): 1–6.
- Bennett, David, and Collits, Terry. "Postcolonial critic: Homi Bhabha interviewed by David Bennett and Terry Collits". Literary India: comparative studies in aesthetics, colonialism, and culture. Ed. Patrick Colm Hogan; Lalita Pandit. SUNY series in Hindu studies. Albany: State University of New York, 1995.
- Mitchell, W.J.T. "Translator translated (interview with cultural theorist Homi Bhabha)". Artforum 33.7 (1995): 80–84.
- Hall, Gary; Wortham, Simon. "Rethinking Authority: Interview with Homi K. Bhabha". Angelaki 2.2 (1996): 59–63.
- Voices of the Crossing - The impact of Britain on writers from Asia, the Caribbean and Africa. Ferdinand Dennis, Naseem Khan (eds), London: Serpent's Tail, 1998. Homi Bhabha: p. 133, "The Vernacular Cosmopolitan".

=== General criticism ===
- Thompson, Paul. "Between identities: Homi Bhabha interviewed by Paul Thompson". In Rina Benmayor, Andor Skotnes (eds), Migration and identity, Oxford; New York: Oxford University Press, 1984.
- Xie, Shaobo. “Writing on boundaries: Homi Bhabha's recent essays". ARIEL: A review of International English literature 27.4 (1996): 155–166.
- Leonard, Philip. "Degenerescent Lections: Legal Fictions in Rushdie, Derrida, and Bhabha". New Formations: A Journal of Culture, Theory & Politics 32 (1997): 109–119.
- Easthope, Anthony. "Bhabha, hybridity, and identity". Textual Practice 12.2 (1998): 341–348.
- Fludernik, Monika. "The constitution of hybridity: postcolonial interventions". Hybridity and postcolonialism: twentieth-century Indian literature. Ed. Monika Fludernik. Tübingen, Germany: Stauffenburg, 1998. 19–53.
- Phillips, Lawrence. "Lost in Space: Siting/Citing the In-Between of Homi Bhabha's The Location of Culture". Jouvert: A Journal of Postcolonial Studies 2.2 (1998).
- Perloff, Marjorie. "Cultural liminality / Aesthetic closure?: The interstitial perspective of Homi Bhabha".
- Ray, Sangeeta. “The nation in performance: Bhabha, Mukherjee and Kureishi”. Hybridity and postcolonialism: twentieth-century Indian literature. Ed. Monika Fludernik. Tübingen, Germany: Stauffenburg, 1998. 219–238.

== See also ==
- List of deconstructionists
- Post-structuralism
- Postmodernism
- Racial fetishism
