= Jacqueline Bhabha =

British academic and US attorney

- Born: Jacqueline Strimpel; 1951 (age 74–75); Bombay, Bombay State, India
- Citizenship: British
- Education: Oxford University (BA, MSc); The University of Law
- Occupations: Attorney, academic
- Spouse: Homi K. Bhabha
- Children: 3, including Satya

Jacqueline Strimpel Bhabha (born 1951) is a British academic, and an attorney. She is the Jeremiah Smith, Jr. lecturer in law at Harvard Law School and teaches public policy at Harvard Kennedy School.

Her research and legal practice has focused on citizenship and rights of aliens, refugee law, trafficking, and smuggling. She is married to Homi K. Bhabha, the critical theorist, and they have three children.

== Early life and education ==
Bhabha was born Jacqueline Strimpel in Mumbai in 1951, the daughter of Jewish refugee parents who had moved to India to flee Nazi Germany. The family moved to Milan, Italy in 1961 when she was ten years old.

She matriculated at Bedales, a British boarding school. Bhabha received a first class honours degree in philosophy and psychology from Oxford University in 1973, and an MSc in applied social studies in 1975 at the Department of Social Policy and Intervention, University of Oxford. Despite claims made on her Harvard biography page and in other media that she holds a JD, she does not have a doctoral degree. Bhabha completed the Common Professional Examination to qualify as a solicitor at what was then the College of Law in London.

== Career ==
Bhabha started her career as a human rights lawyer in London and at the European Court of Human Rights in Strasbourg. In 1997, Bhabha entered academia when she joined the University of Chicago as the Director of the Human Rights Program – an appointment she continued till 2001.

She later joined Harvard Law School and become a lecturer in law. She serves as the Director of Research at the Francois Bagnoud Xavier Center for Health and Human Rights at Harvard, and the University Adviser on Human Rights Education to the Provost at Harvard University. She is also a lecturer on public policy at Harvard Kennedy School.

In February 2022, Bhabha was one of 38 Harvard faculty to sign a letter to the Harvard Crimson defending Professor John Comaroff, who had been found to have violated the university's sexual and professional conduct policies. The letter defended Comaroff as "an excellent colleague, advisor and committed university citizen" and expressed dismay over his being sanctioned by the university. After students filed a lawsuit with detailed allegations of Comaroff's actions and the university's failure to respond, Bhabha was one of several signatories to say that she wished to retract her signature.

== Publications ==
- "Pertenecer a Europa: ciudadanía y derechos posnacionales"
- Co-author Women's Movement: Women Under Immigration, Nationality and Refugee Law (1994),
- Editor Asylum Law And Practice in Europe and North America (1992),
- Article Get Back to Where You Once Belonged: Identity, Citizenship and Exclusion in Europe Human Rights Quarterly (1998),
- Article Internationalist Gatekeepers? The tension between asylum advocacy and human rights(2002),
- Article The Citizenship Deficit: On Being a Citizen Child (2003).
- Article Reforming Immigration Policy Boston Review (2005)
- Article Moving Babies: Globalization, Markets, and Transnational Adoption The Fletcher Forum of World Affairs (2004)

== Personal life ==
She is married to Homi K. Bhabha, the critical theorist. They have three children: Ishan, Satya (an actor), and Leah.
