= Adi Godrej =

Indian businessman

Adi Burjorji Godrej
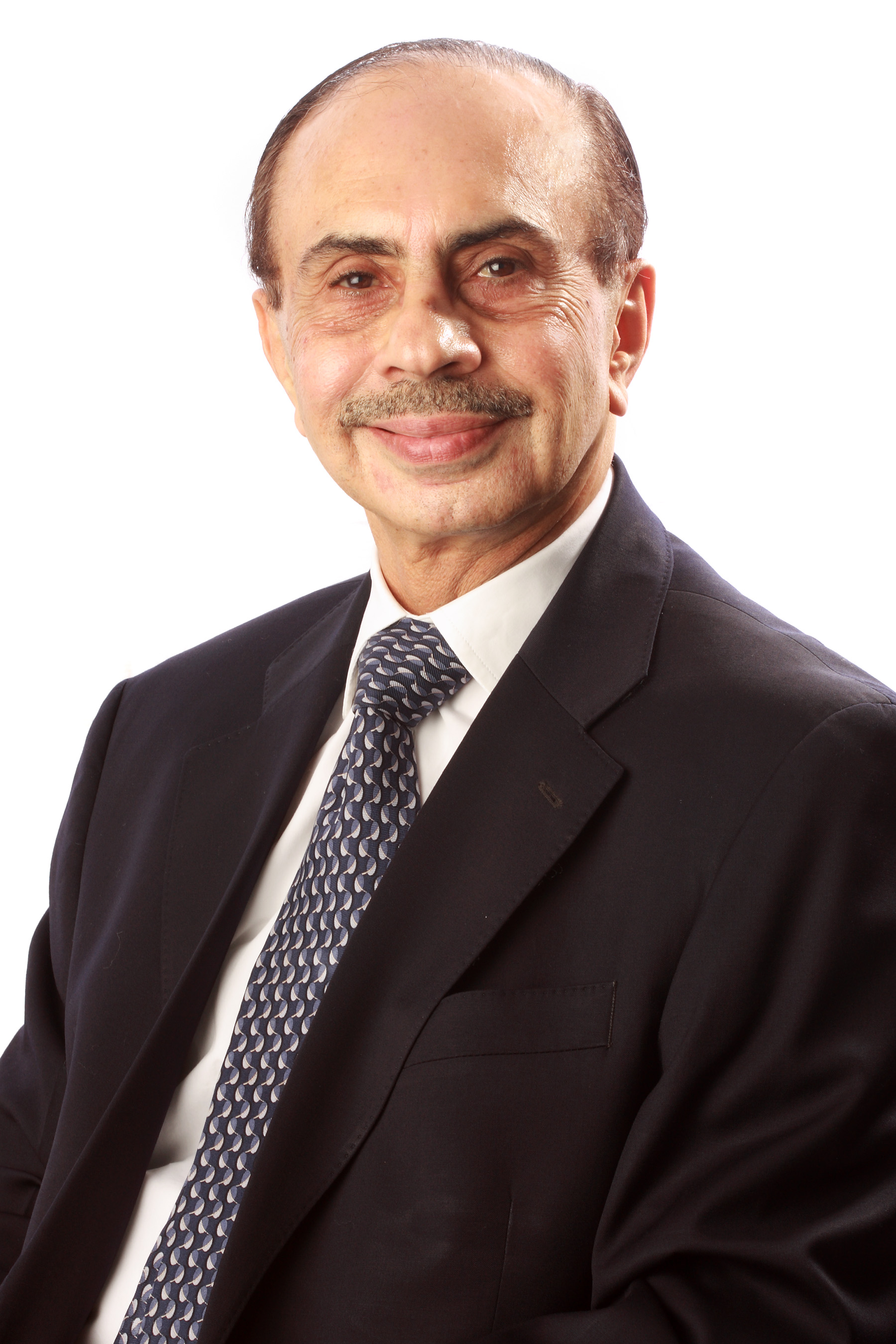
- Born: 5 April 1942 (age 84); Bombay, Bombay Presidency, British India
- Education: St. Xavier's College, Mumbai; MIT Sloan School of Management
- Occupation: Chairman of Godrej Group
- Spouse: Parmeshwar Adi Godrej (died 2016)
- Children: Nisaba Adi Godrej; Pirojsha Adi Godrej; Tanya Arvind Dubash

Adi Burjorji Godrej (born 3 April 1942) is an Indian Parsi billionaire businessman and head of the Godrej family, chairman of the Godrej Group. As of November 2025, he has an estimated net worth of US$4 billion.

== Early life ==
Godrej completed his schooling at St. Xavier's High School and then St. Xavier's College, Mumbai for two years. He earned an undergraduate degree from HL College and an MBA from the MIT Sloan School of Management, where he was a member of the Pi Lambda Phi fraternity and a member of Tau Beta Pi.

== Career ==
After his return to India, he joined the family business. He modernized the management structure, implemented process improvements and improved the company during the License Raj. He heads the group alongside his brother, managing director of Godrej Industries and chairman of Godrej Agrovet, Nadir Godrej, and his cousin, Godrej & Boyce managing director and chairman, Jamshyd Godrej.

In 2021, he announced plans to step down as chairman of Godrej Industries, the holding company of the Godrej Group. He would continue as chairman of the Godrej Group and chairman emeritus of GIL.

=== Beyond Godrej ===
He was chairman of the Indian School of Business from April 2011 to April 2018 and was president of the Confederation of Indian Industry (CII) for the year 2012–13. He has been a member of the dean's advisory council of the MIT Sloan School of Management, and chairman of the board of governors of the Narsee Monjee Institute of Management Studies.

Twenty-five per cent of the shares of the Godrej holding company are held in trusts that include the Pirojsha Godrej Foundation, the Soonabai Pirojsha Godrej Foundation, and the Godrej Memorial Trust. Through these trusts, the Group supports healthcare, education, and environmental sustainability initiatives such as The Mangroves, Teach for India, WWF, and the Godrej Memorial Hospital.

== Personal life ==
He was married to socialite and philanthropist Parmeshwar Godrej until her death in October 2016 and has three children. They live in Malabar Hill, South Mumbai.

In April 2026, it was announced that Nadir Godrej would retire as chairman of Godrej Industries in August 2026, and be succeeded by Adi Godrej's son Pirojsha Godrej.
