= Saleem Sinai =

Protagonist of the novel Midnight's Children by Salman Rushdie

Saleem Sinai is the protagonist of the Booker Prize-winning novel Midnight's Children by Salman Rushdie. His life is closely intertwined with the events that take place in his homeland of pre- and post-colonial India, and newly created Pakistan and Bangladesh (East Bengal). He is born at the moment in time when India and Pakistan emerge from British rule and lives during the new tumultuous struggles that engulf the new nations following 15 August 1947. Sinai embodies these physical struggles and rifts during, and serves as a metaphor for, the spiritual, religious, political and intellectual traumas of the young nations.

== Literary significance ==
Rushdie's character has been much discussed in literary circles. Midnight's Children is considered by many to be the author's masterwork, and it has inspired a generation of writers on the subcontinent. Many authors have their work compared to it and their characters compared to Saleem Sinai, and focus on aspects of his complex character. The character has been discussed as being in many ways an autobiographical representation of Rushdie himself.

== Character as metaphor for India's history ==
Saleem Sinai is an Anglo-Indian who is the first child born in India after the moment of India's independence and is a self-conscious narrator who questions the readers' assumptions about what constitutes a life story or a nation's history. His life and his experiences in the novel are inseparable from the events taking place around him and so he truly becomes a child of history. A Times of India review calls Saleem the most loved of Rushdie's many characters, despite, or perhaps because of, his being "the snot-nosed, cucumber-nosed know-all narrator of Midnight’s Children, whose life swings between exultation and suffering, for he has been 'handcuffed to history', a coupling determined by his time of birth, midnight on August 15, 1947, when 'clock-hands joined palms in respectful greeting'".

India's national newspaper The Hindu noted the success of the novel and the significance of its main character, calling Midnight's Children "an extraordinary literary jewel (it was awarded the Booker of Bookers in 1993, and a host of other prizes), focusing on the fates of two children that are inextricably linked by the hour of their birth, literally 'handcuffed to history'".

Sinai is the product of extra-marital intercourse and is raised by a Muslim family after being exchanged at birth by his nurse, Mary Pereira. Over the course of the novel he goes from riches to rags. He has telepathic and other supernatural powers that are part of a special connection with those born in South Asia at the same historic moment. He is also unusual in having an unsightly nose that constantly runs, and bulging temples. Rushdie grants the character supernatural powers and he comes to symbolize and embody the struggle and strains of a nation being born and torn into pieces all at the same time.

The character is borrowed from the draft of an earlier novel called The Antagonist.

== Adaptations ==
In a theatrical version of the novel, Zubin Varla played Saleem Sinai. He said he identified strongly with the story as, "His own family hailed from Bombay's tiny Zoroastrian community, and he grew up in Britain with a sense of cultural alienation similar to that of his character." The performance was done by 20 actors who played the 60 or 70 roles comprising the complex storyline.

== See also ==
- List of Midnight's Children characters
