= Godrej Consumer Products =

Indian consumer goods company

Godrej Consumer Products Limited
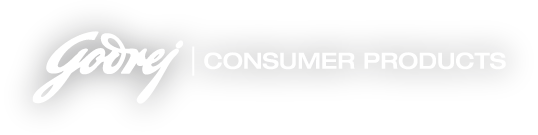
- Type: Public
- Traded as: NSE: GODREJCP; BSE: 532424
- Industry: Consumer goods
- Founded: 2001
- Headquarters: Mumbai, Maharashtra, India
- Area served: India
- Key people: Adi Godrej, Chairperson Emiratus; Nisba Godrej, Chairperson & MD; Sudhir Sitapati, CEO and MD;
- Products: Cleaning agents, personal care, skin care;
- Revenue: ▲₹14,680 crore (US$1.5 billion) (2025)
- Operating income: ▲₹2,735 crore (US$280 million) (2025)
- Net income: ▲₹1,852 crore (US$190 million) (2025)
- Total assets: ▲₹19,672 crore (US$2.0 billion) (2025)
- Total equity: ▼₹12,004 crore (US$1.2 billion) (2025)
- Number of employees: 2,768 (2020)
- Parent: Godrej Industries Group
- Subsidiaries: Essence Consumer Care Products Pvt. Ltd.; Naturesse Consumer Care Products Pvt. Ltd.; Godrej Hygiene Products Ltd.; Godrej Netherlands B.V.
- Website: godrejcp.com

Godrej Consumer Products Limited (GCPL) is an Indian Multinational consumer goods company based in Mumbai, India. GCPL's products include soap, hair colourants, toiletries and liquid detergents. Its brands include 'Cinthol', 'Godrej Fair Glow', 'Godrej No.1' and 'Godrej Shikakai' in soaps, 'Godrej Powder Hair Dye', 'Renew', 'ColourSoft' in hair colourants and 'Ezee' liquid detergent. GCPL operates several manufacturing facilities in India spread over seven locations and grouped into four operating clusters at Malanpur (Madhya Pradesh), Guwahati (Assam), Baddi- Thana (Himachal Pradesh), Baddi- Katha (Himachal Pradesh), Pondicherry, Chennai and Sikkim. On January 16, 2024, Godrej Consumer Products Limited launched the liquid detergent Godrej Fab in southern India.

== History ==
The consumer products business was part of the erstwhile Godrej Soaps Limited (GSL) and was demerged into Godrej Consumer Products Limited in April 2001, pursuant to a scheme of demerger approved by the Honorable High Court of Judicature, Mumbai, dated 14 March 2001.

== Acquisitions ==
GCPL has bought out foreign companies such as Keyline Brands Limited (United Kingdom) in 2005, Rapidol (Pty) Limited in 2006, and Godrej Global Mid East FZE in 2007 and Argencos in Argentina, and later acquired Cosmética Nacional, a Chilean company.

In 2015, Godrej announced it had fully acquired a 100% equity stake in South African hair extensions firm Frika Hair.

== Business categories ==
GCPL operates in the domestic and international markets in the 'personal and household care' segment. Some of the categories are soaps, hair colourants, professional hair care products, toiletries and liquid detergents. In 2012, it made an entry into fast-growing air freshener category by launching a new fragrance product "aer" in the market.

== Competition ==
- In the soaps category, GCPL brands compete with Lux and Lifebuoy (Hindustan Unilever Limited).
- In the hair colours category, its products compete for market share with Black Rose, Super Vasmol and L’Oreal.
- Competitors in shaving cream category are Gillette, Palmolive and Old Spice.
- GCPL's talcum powder brands, compete with Pond's (HUL) and Denim.
- In the liquid detergent category, GCPL brands Ezee and Genteel, compete with Safewash (Wipro) and Surf Excel (HUL).

== Manufacturing facilities ==
GCPL operates several manufacturing facilities in India spread over seven locations and grouped into four operating clusters at Malanpur (Madhya Pradesh), Guwahati (Assam), Baddi- Thana (Himachal Pradesh), Baddi- Katha (Himachal Pradesh), Pondicherry, Chennai and Sikkim. Further, its manufacturing facilities located abroad in South Africa produce a range of personal care products and hair colour products.

== Sales and distribution network ==
GCPL has a widespread distribution network across India. It makes sales in both urban and rural markets, enabling it to benefit from the opportunities in both segments. It has a sales team of over 250 staff spread across the country. It has a network of 33 C&F agents and as on 29 February 2008. It had 1,247 distributors, 142 super stockists and 3,175 sub stockists to support the sales team in India. Its distributors and sub stockists cover around 650,000 retailers in India.

GCPL has linked its major distributors in India through a system called 'Sampark', a collaborative planning, forecasting and replenishment system with its ERP system leading to reduced inventory levels.

== Research and development ==
GCPL's R&D department develops new products, standardizes analytical methods, and sources affordable alternatives for key raw materials. By continuously gathering consumer feedback, the team informs and enhances product development. The facility holds official recognition from New Delhi's Department of Science and Technology.

== Size of the company ==
As of 2014, GCPL employs 21,000 employees.
