= Midnight's Children =

1981 novel by Salman Rushdie

- First edition
- Author: Salman Rushdie
- Cover artist: Bill Botten
- Language: English
- Genre: Magic realism, historiographic metafiction
- Set in: British India from 1915 to 1947, India from 1947 to the late 1950s, Pakistan in the 1960s, Bangladesh in 1971, India in the 1970s
- Publisher: Jonathan Cape
- Publication date: March 12, 1981
- Publication place: United Kingdom
- Media type: Print (hardback and paperback)
- Pages: 446
- ISBN: 0-224-01823-X
- OCLC: 8234329

Midnight's Children is the second novel by Indian-British writer Salman Rushdie, published in 1981 by Jonathan Cape with cover design by Bill Botten, about India's transition from British colonial rule to independence and partition. It is a postcolonial, postmodern and magical realist story told by its chief protagonist, Saleem Sinai, set in the context of historical events. The style of preserving history with fictional accounts is self-reflexive. In the way it interweaves a personal with a national biography it has similarities to Günter Grass's The Tin Drum.

Midnight's Children sold over one million copies in the UK alone and won the Booker Prize and James Tait Black Memorial Prize in 1981. It was also awarded the special Booker of Bookers prize in 1993, and the Best of the Booker in 2008, to celebrate the Booker Prize's 25th and 40th anniversaries. In 2003 the novel appeared at number 100 on the BBC's The Big Read poll which determined the UK's "best-loved novels" of all time.

== Background and plot summary ==
Midnight's Children is a loose allegory for events in 1947 British Raj India and after the partition of India. The protagonist and narrator of the story is Saleem Sinai, born at the exact moment when India became an independent country. The novel is divided into three books.

The first book begins with the story of the Sinai family, particularly with events leading up to the fall of British Colonial India and the partition. Saleem is born precisely at midnight, 15 August 1947, therefore, exactly as old as independent India. He later discovers that all children born in India between 12 a.m. and 1 a.m. on that date are imbued with special powers. Saleem, using his telepathic powers, assembles a Midnight Children's Conference, reflective of the issues India faced in its early statehood concerning the cultural, linguistic, religious, and political differences faced by a vastly diverse nation. Saleem acts as a telepathic conduit, bringing hundreds of geographically disparate children into contact while also attempting to discover the meaning of their gifts. In particular, those children born closest to the stroke of midnight wield more powerful gifts than the others. Shiva "of the Knees", Saleem's nemesis, and Parvati, called "Parvati-the-witch," are two of these children with notable gifts and roles in Saleem's story.

Meanwhile, Saleem's family begin a number of migrations and endure the numerous wars which plague the subcontinent. During this period he also suffers amnesia until he enters a quasi-mythological exile in the jungle of Sundarban, where he is re-endowed with his memory. In doing so, he reconnects with his childhood friends. Saleem later becomes involved with the Indira Gandhi-proclaimed Emergency and her son Sanjay's "cleansing" of the Jama Masjid slum. For a time Saleem is held as a political prisoner; these passages contain scathing criticisms of Indira Gandhi's over-reach during the Emergency as well as a personal lust for power bordering on godhood. The Emergency signals the end of the potency of the Midnight Children, and there is little left for Saleem to do but pick up the few pieces of his life he may still find and write the chronicle that encompasses both his personal history and that of his still-young nation, a chronicle written for his son, who, like his father, is both chained and supernaturally endowed by history.

== Themes ==
The technique of magical realism finds liberal expression throughout the novel and is crucial to constructing the parallel to the country's history. The story moves in different parts of Indian Subcontinent – from Kashmir to Agra and then to Bombay, Lahore and Dhaka. Nicholas Stewart in his essay, "Magic realism in relation to the post-colonial and Midnight's Children," argues that the "narrative framework of Midnight's Children consists of a tale – comprising his life story – which Saleem Sinai recounts orally to his wife-to-be Padma. This self-referential narrative (within a single paragraph Saleem refers to himself in the first person: 'And I, wishing upon myself the curse of Nadir Khan...;' and the third: '"I tell you," Saleem cried, "it is true. ..."') recalls indigenous Indian culture, particularly the similarly orally recounted Arabian Nights. The events in the book also parallel the magical nature of the narratives recounted in Arabian Nights (consider the attempt to electrocute Saleem at the latrine (p. 353), or his journey in the 'basket of invisibility' (p. 383))."

He also notes that, "the narrative comprises and compresses Indian cultural history." "'Once upon a time,' Saleem muses, 'there were Radha and Krishna, and Rama and Sita, and Laila and Majnun; also (because we are not unaffected by the West) Romeo and Juliet, and Spencer Tracy and Katharine Hepburn' (259)." Stewart (citing Hutcheon) suggests that Midnight's Children chronologically entwines characters from both India and the West, "with post-colonial Indian history to examine both the effect of these indigenous and non-indigenous cultures on the Indian mind and in the light of Indian independence."

Midnight’s Children anticipates Rushdie’s later preoccupation with the socio-political responsibility of the writer, as articulated in his essay “Imaginary Homelands” (1991). In this essay, Rushdie reflects on the changing world and calls for politically committed writing that unmasks political shams and legerdemains. Both the novel and the essay express this concern by aiming to present the world differently, in ways that might bring about positive change. As Rushdie writes, “I once took part in a conference on modern writing at New College, Oxford. Various novelists, myself included, were talking earnestly of such matters as the need for new ways of describing the world.” He contends that describing the world is inherently political, and that “redescribing a world is the necessary first step towards changing it.” Therefore, he argues, the act of writing is political because “it is particularly at times when the state takes reality into its own hands, and sets about distorting it, altering the past to fit its present needs, that the making of the alternative realities of art, including the novel of memory, becomes politicized.” Likewise, in Midnight’s Children, writing becomes a political act as Rushdie offers alternative realities that challenge the politician’s version of truth. Saleem, the protagonist, represents the author-figure who strives to assemble voices from diverse cultural centres to bring about positive change in a disconnected world, symbolized in the 1947 partition of India.

== Style ==
Midnight's Children has been called "a watershed in the post-independence development of the Indian English novel", to the extent that the decade after its 1981 publication has been called "post-Rushdie". During that decade, many novels inspired by Midnight's Children were written by both established and young Indian writers.

Rushdie's innovative use of magical realism allowed him to employ the nation-as-family allegory and at the same time confound it with an impossible telepathy among a multitude of children from a multitude of languages, cultures, regions and religions. No one genre dominates the entire novel, however. It encompasses the comic and the tragic, the real, the surreal, and the mythic. The postcolonial experience could not be expressed by a Western or Eastern, public or private, polarity or unity, any more than any single political party could represent all the people of the nation.

Rushdie also coined the word chutnification in the book to describe the adoption of Indian elements into the English language or culture. A chutney is a sauce for a dry base, originating from the Indian subcontinent.

== Reception ==
Upon release, the book was generally well-received.

Midnight's Children was awarded the 1981 Booker Prize, the English Speaking Union Literary Award, and the James Tait Prize. It also was awarded The Best of the Booker prize twice, in 1993 and 2008 (this was an award given out by the Booker committee to celebrate the 25th and 40th anniversary of the award).

The book went on to sell over one million copies in the UK alone.

According to Rushdie, "...I celebrated the book’s critical reception...The three I have never forgotten were written by Anita Desai in the Washington Post, by Clark Blaise in the New York Times and by Robert Towers in the New York Review of Books." According to Rushdie, there was "one memorable bad review". In his words from Los Angeles Times, "The BBC radio program “Kaleidoscope” had devoted a great deal of time to my novel, and given it the works: Indian music to introduce it, a reading, a sympathetic interview with me, and then it was over to their critic ... who unreservedly hated the book. The program’s presenter, Sheridan Morley, kept asking this critic (whose name I’ve forgotten) to find some little thing to praise. “But didn’t you think ... “ “Wouldn’t you at least agree that ... “ and so on. The critic was implacable. No, no, there was nothing he had liked at all. After the magnificent buildup, this negative intransigence was delightfully, bathetically funny."

In 1984 Prime Minister Indira Gandhi brought an action against the book in the British courts, claiming to have been defamed by a single sentence in the penultimate paragraph of chapter 28, in which her son Sanjay Gandhi was said to have had a hold over his mother by his accusing her of contributing to his father Feroze Gandhi's death through her neglect. The case was settled out of court when Salman Rushdie agreed to remove the offending sentence.

== Adaptations ==
In the late 1990s the BBC was planning to film a five-part mini-series of the novel with Rahul Bose in the lead, but due to pressure from the Muslim community in Sri Lanka (a later Rushdie's novel, The Satanic Verses, published in 1988 caused widespread uproar in the Muslim world), the filming permit was revoked and the project was cancelled. Later in 2003, the novel was adapted for the stage by the Royal Shakespeare Company. BBC Radio 4 broadcast a dramatic adaptation in 2017 at the 70th anniversary of Indian independence, repeated in five parts in 2021.

Director Deepa Mehta collaborated with Salman Rushdie on a new version of the story, the film Midnight's Children. British-Indian actor Satya Bhabha played the role of Saleem Sinai while other roles were played by Indian actors Shriya Saran, Seema Biswas, Shabana Azmi, Anupam Kher, Siddharth Narayan, Rahul Bose, Soha Ali Khan, Shahana Goswami, Anita Majumdar and Darsheel Safary. The film was premiered in September 2012 at the Toronto International Film Festival (2012-09-09) and the Vancouver International Film Festival (2012-09-27). For an academic overview of the adaptations of Midnight's Children, see Mendes and Kuortti (2016).

In June 2018 streaming service Netflix announced plans to adapt Midnight's Children as an original Netflix TV series. By the end of 2019, the project had been abandoned. Although showrunner Vishal Bhardwaj had received support from Rushdie for his script and had done much of the work on casting and scouting locations, after the compromises he had made on his poorly-received 2017 film Rangoon he would not go ahead without agreement for a more ambitious project with a greater special effects budget than Netflix was prepared to agree.

== See also ==
- Jallianwala Bagh massacre
- List of Midnight's Children characters
- Le Monde's 100 Books of the Century
- Mahagujarat movement
