= The Marina Mall Chennai =

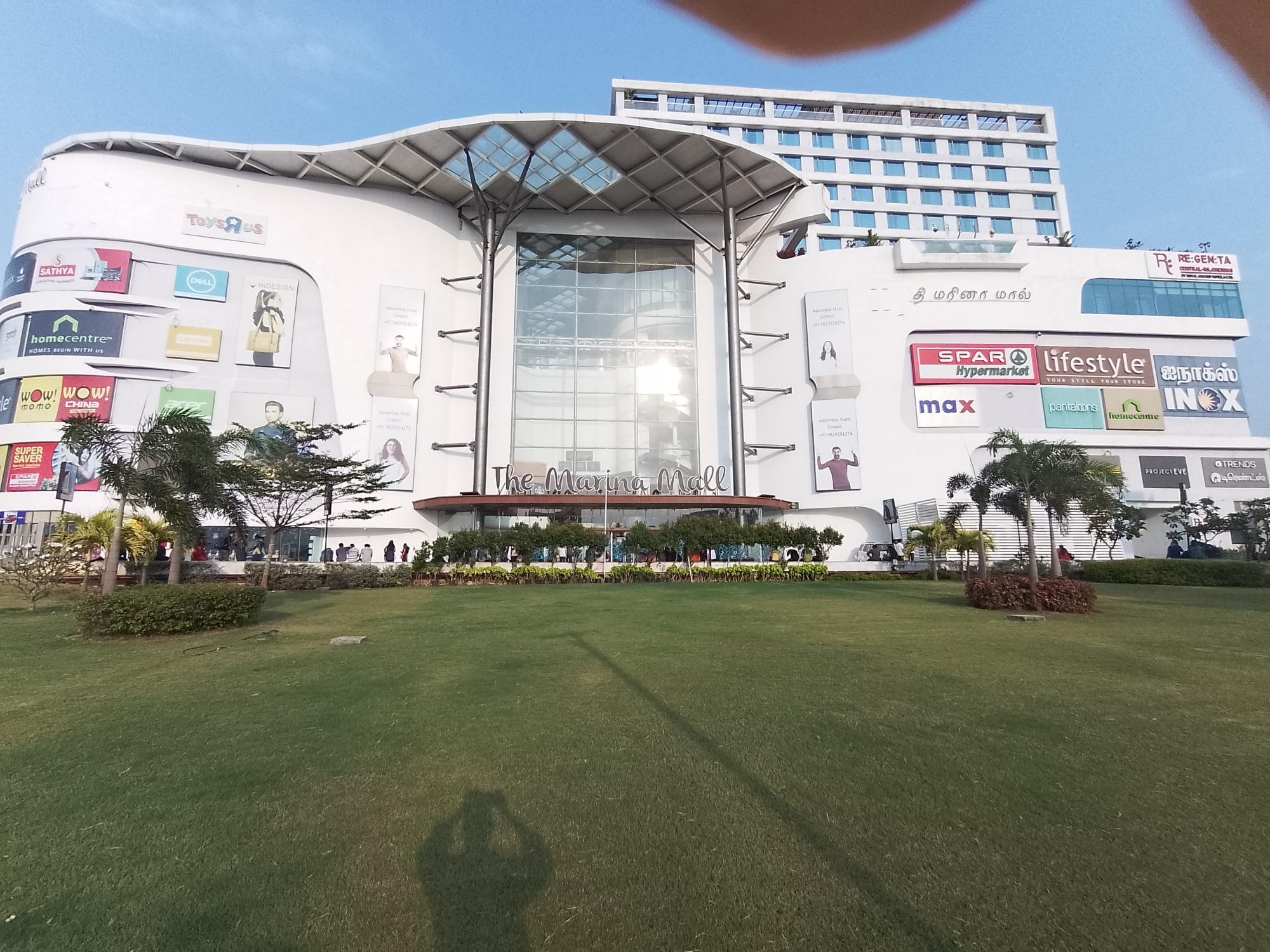
- Picture of The Marina Mall
- Location: OMR, Egattur, Chennai, India
- Coordinates: 12.8359°N 80.2291°E
- Address: Old Mahabalipuram Road, Egattur, Chennai, Tamil Nadu 603103
- Opened: 15 February 2019
- Developer: OMR Mall Developers Pvt Ltd
- Owner: Syed Abdul Kader and Family
- Num. of stores: 120 +
- Floor area: 550,000 sq ft
- Floors: 3 Basements Parking floors 6 Shopping and Entertainment floors 1 office floor
- Parking: 1,200 parking lots for both cars and bikes
- Website: http://marinamallchennai.com/

The Marina Mall Chennai (opened: 15 February 2019) is a shopping centre located in OMR Egattur in Chennai, Tamil Nadu, India. It is the largest shopping mall in the area. It opened its doors to the public on 15 February 2019; it has a 550,000 sq ft leasable space which includes more than 120 shops and services and includes parking with 1,200 parking lots for both cars and bikes.

== History ==
Syed Abdul Kader also known as (HAC) in Kilakarai, and his children Mohammed Mukrim], Aysha Fathima and Sayeed Aslam, partnered with Allied Investments & Housing Limited a prominent real estate promoter in Tamil Nadu, constructed and established the shopping mall on a sizable piece of land that belonged to Mr. Syed Abdul Kader.

== Leadership ==
The mall is promoted by OMR mall developers which was founded in 2008 by Mohammed Mukrim Syed Habeeb and Mr Abdul Wadood. Mr Mukrim is the Chairman, Director and Head of the Department of finance of OMR mall developers, and Mr Aslam is the managing director of OMR mall developer. Finally, Mr Abdul Wadood is CEO of Allied Investments & Housing Ltd. Any major decisions related to the mall would be discussed and decided by these three partners.

== Amenties ==
The mall offers shopping, and entertainment. It includes anchor tenants such as Lifestyle, Home centre, Spar Hypermarket, Decathlon, Levi's and other large and small brands. It is also home to an eight screen multiplex operated by INOX cinemas with a total seating capacity of 1,750. One of the screens is nearly 25 meters wide and arguably the largest in India (Bigpix) . There is also an Australian based gaming arcade known as Timezone, and a trampoline park located in the terrace on the 5th floor known as Dugout along with its very own small cafetaria; and South India's largest inflatable park known as Airborne Inflatable Park located in the 2nd floor of the mall was opened in late 2023. The mall has nine fine dining restaurants and 18 food stalls on the 2nd floor located in the food court. It has more than 1,200 parking lots for both 2 wheelers and 4 wheelers. Furthermore, the shopping center has an in-mall hotel known as Regenta Central RS owned by Royal Orchid Hotels which was opened in mid 2019. Moreover, the mall is also known for organising engaging and convival events every few months such as dinoland or creating a large puzzle art of the former President of India, Dr.A.P.J Abdul Kalam, etc.

== Gallery ==
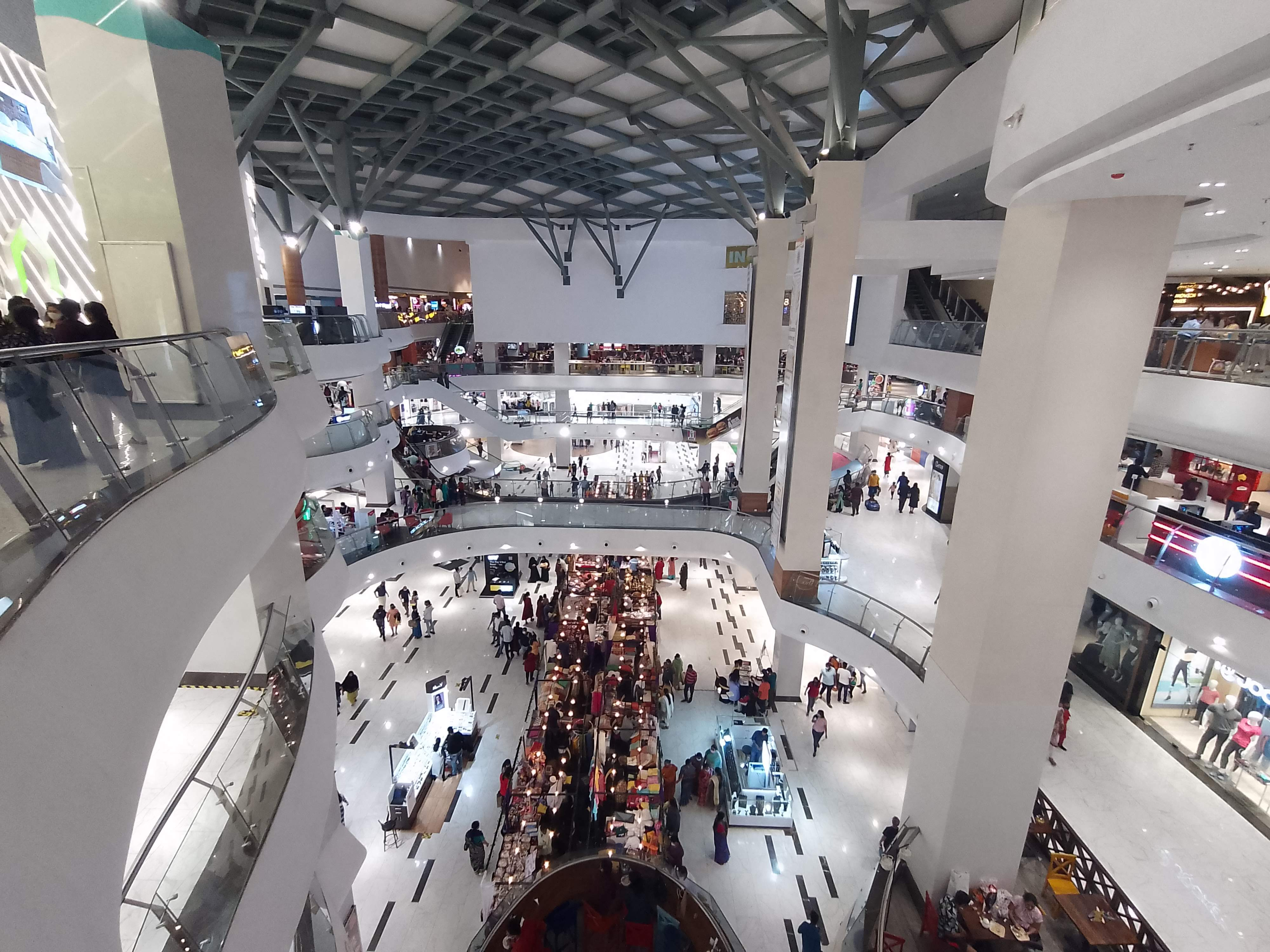
Inside the Marina Mall

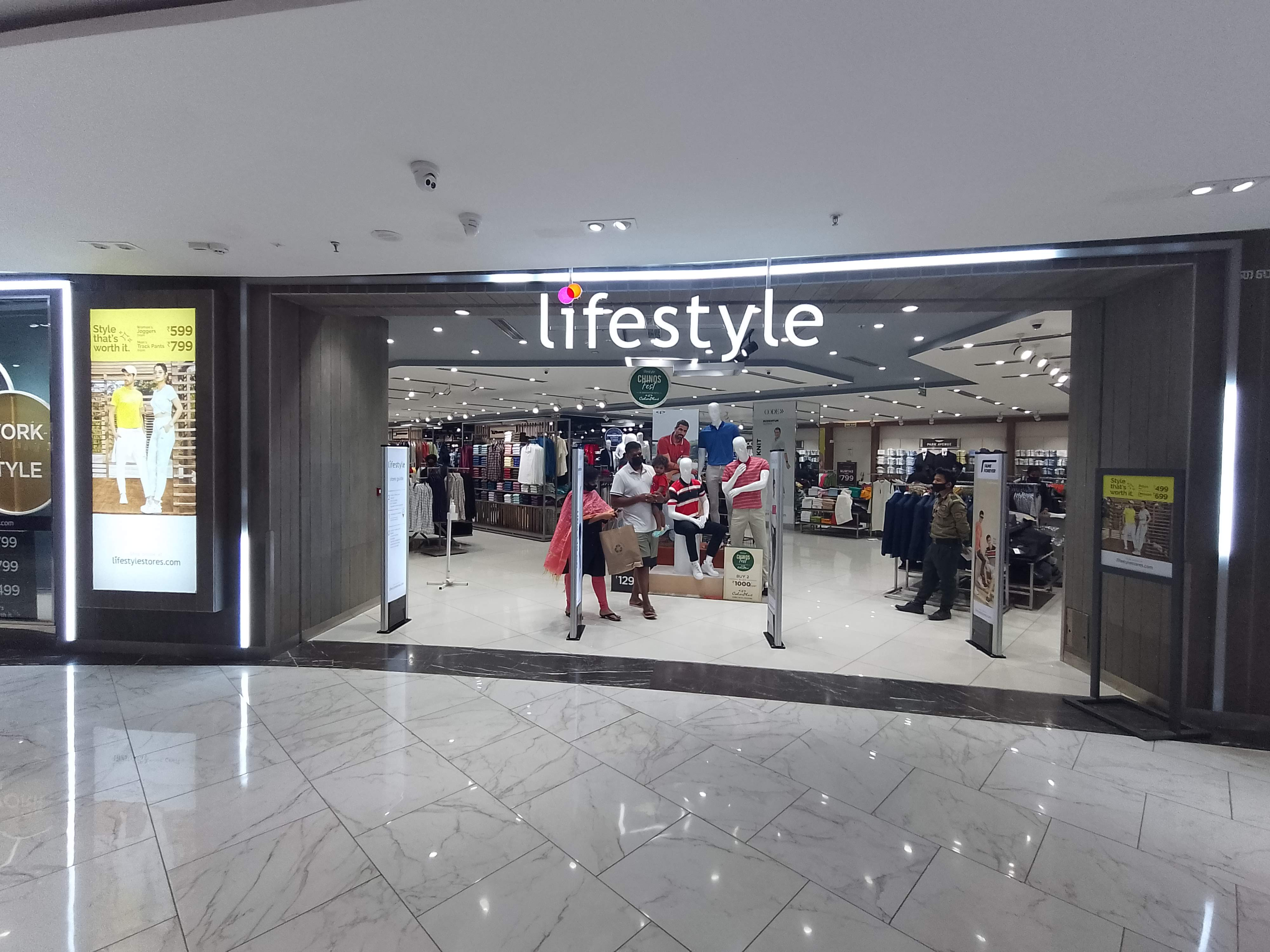
Lifestyle Outlet in Marina Mall

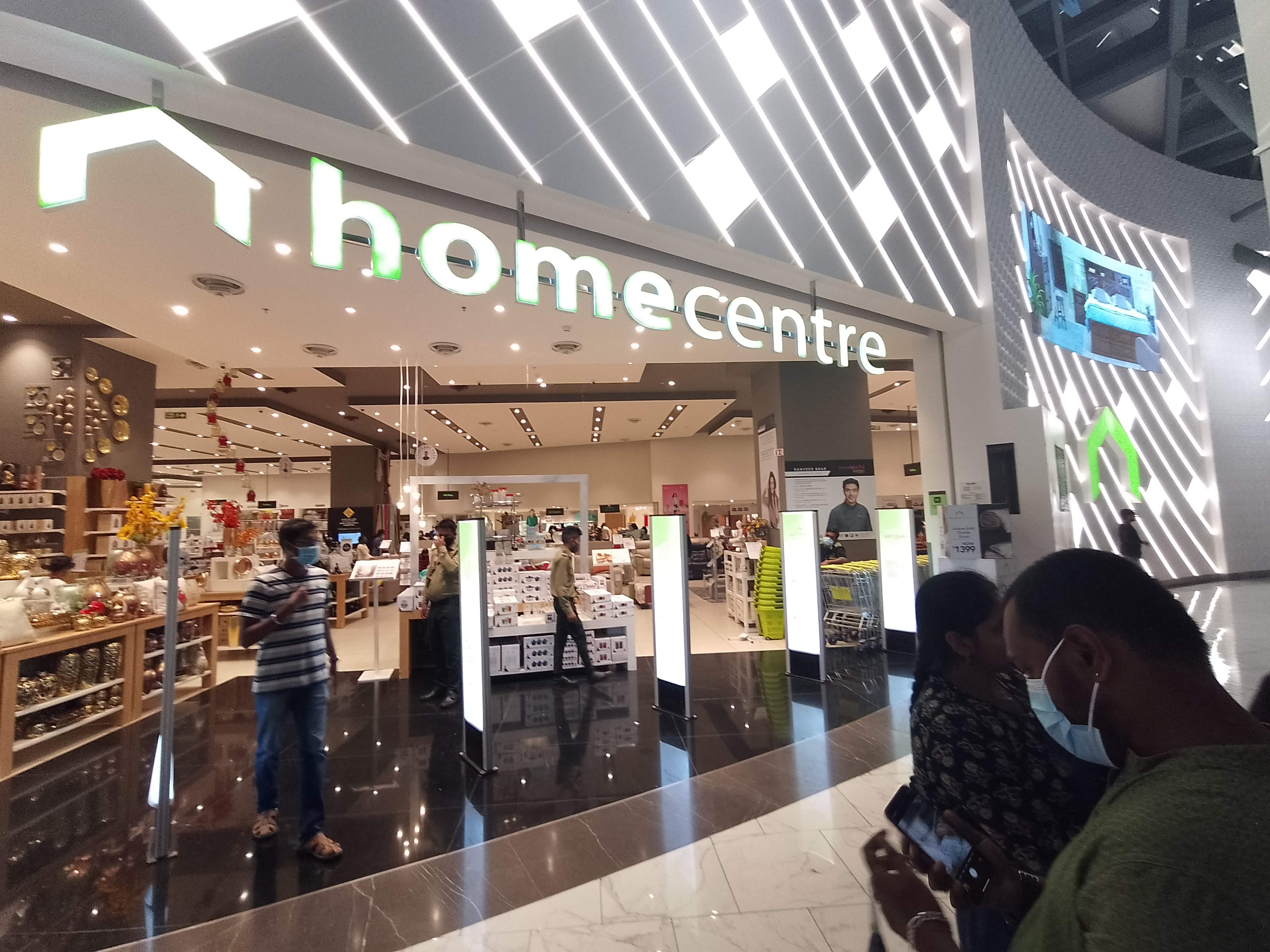
Homecenter Outlet in Marina Mall

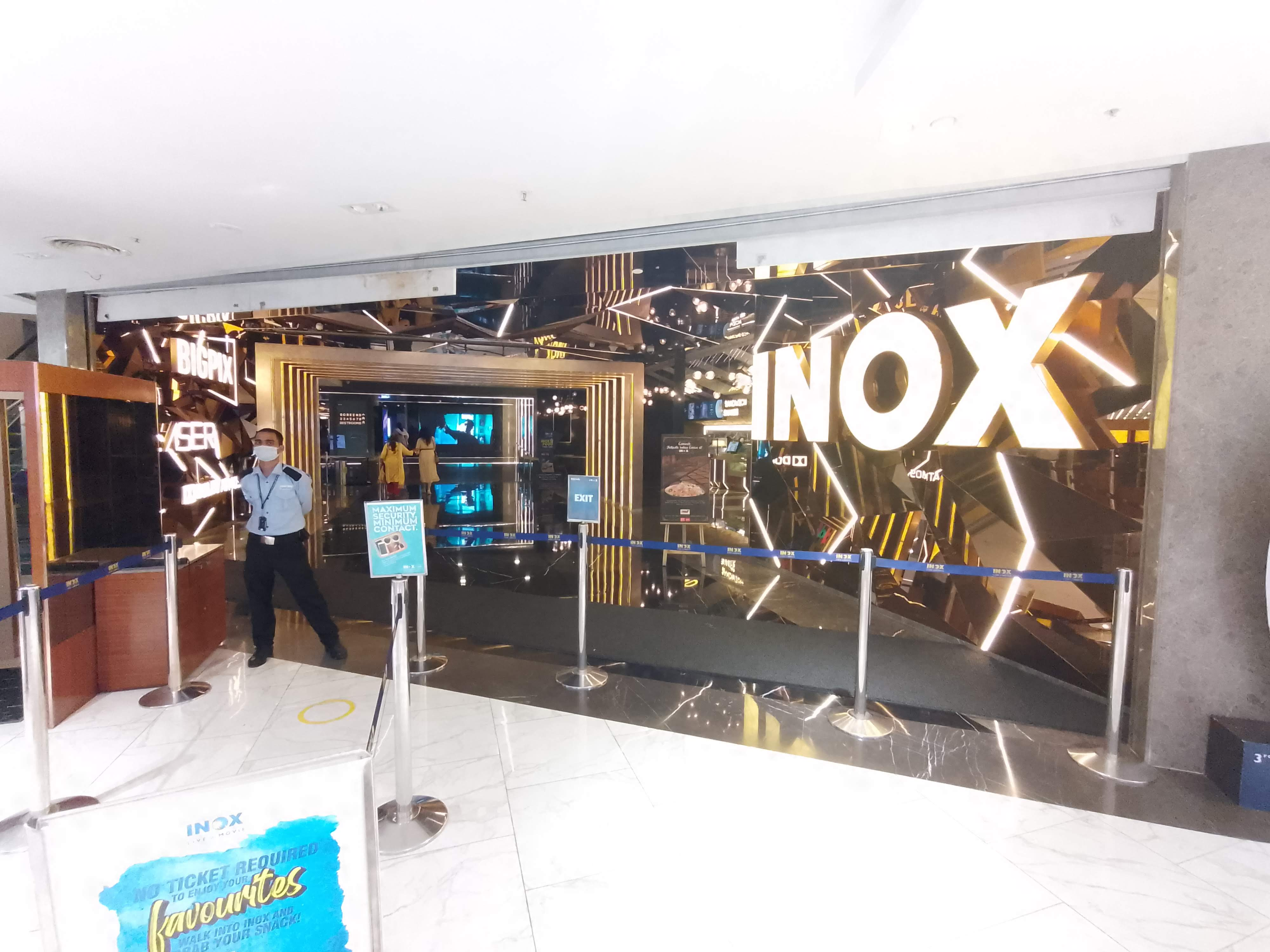
Inox Cinema in Marina Mall
