= List of tourist attractions in Vellore =

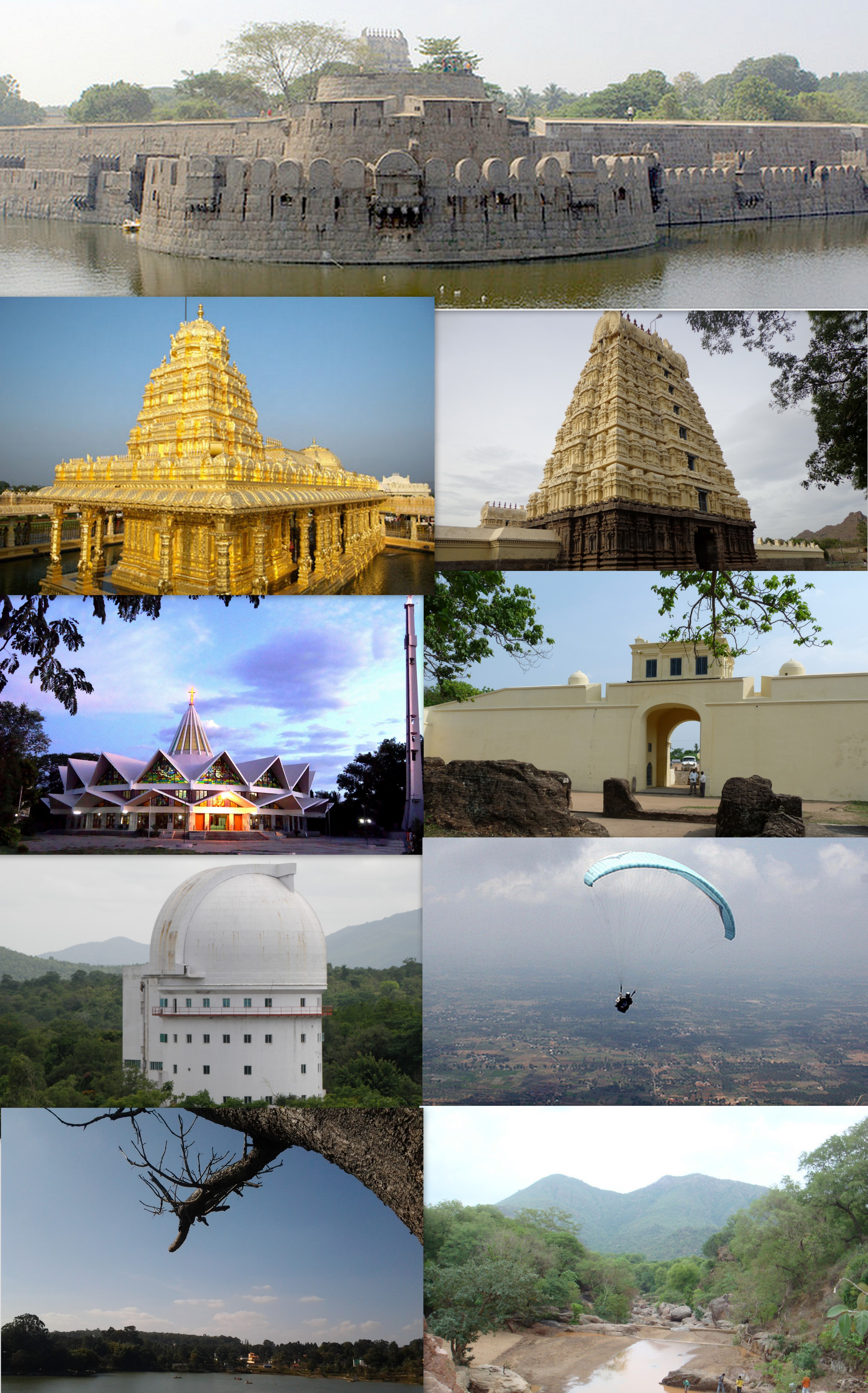
Clockwise from top: Vellore Fort, Jalakandeswarar Temple, Delhi Gate (Vellore), Paragliding at Yelagiri, Amirthi Zoological Park, Yelagiri Lake, Vainu Bappu Observatory, Assumption Cathedral, and Srilakshmi Golden Temple

Historic Vellore Fort, Government Museum, Science Park, Vainu Bappu Observatory, Amirthi Zoological Park, Religious Places like Jalakandeswarar Temple, Srilakshmi Golden Temple, Big Mosque & St. John's Church and Yelagiri Hill station are among the top tourist attractions in and around Vellore.

== Attractions ==
=== Vellore Fort ===
Vellore Fort is a large 16th-century fort situated in the heart of Vellore city, in the state of Tamil Nadu, India built by Vijayanagara Kings. The Fort was at one point of time the headquarters of the Aravidu Dynasty of Vijayanagara Empire. The fort is known for its grand ramparts, wide moat and robust masonry.

The Fort's ownership passed from Vijayanagara Kings, to the Bijapur Sultans, to Marathas, to the Carnatic Nawabs and finally to the British, who held the fort until India gained independence. The Indian government maintains the Fort with the Archaeological Department. During British rule, the Tipu Sultan's family and the last king of Sri Lanka, Sri Vikrama Rajasinha were held in as prisoners in the fort. The fort houses a Christian church, a Muslim mosque and a Hindu temple, the latter of which is famous for its magnificent carvings. The first rebellion against British rule erupted at this fort in 1806, and it is also a witness to the massacre of the Vijayanagara royal family of Sriranga Raya.

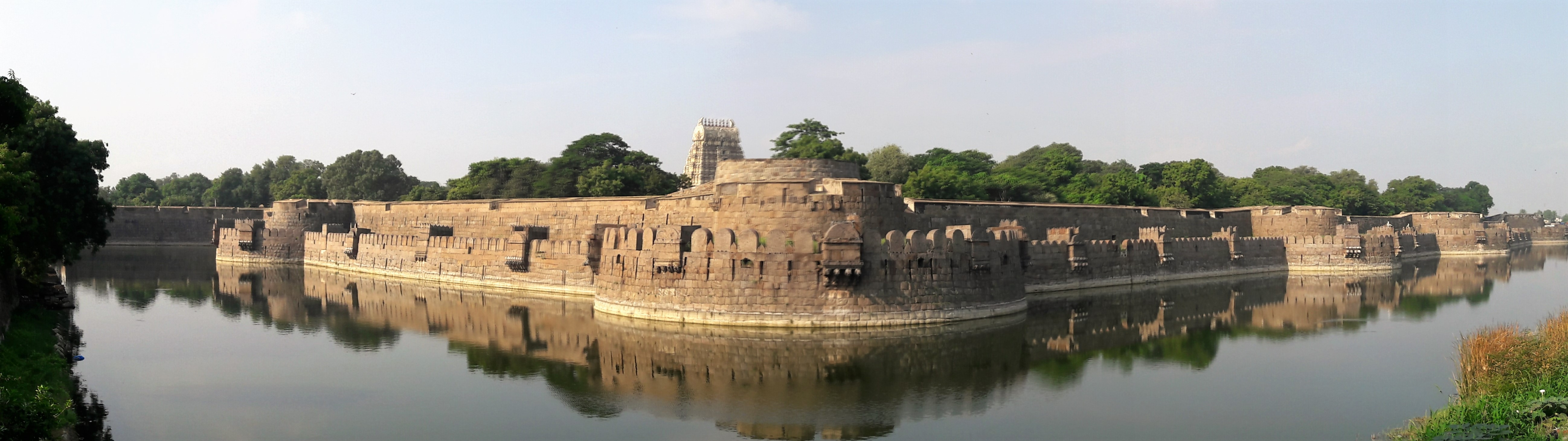
Vellore Fort and Jalakandeswarar temple Panorama

==== Gallery ====
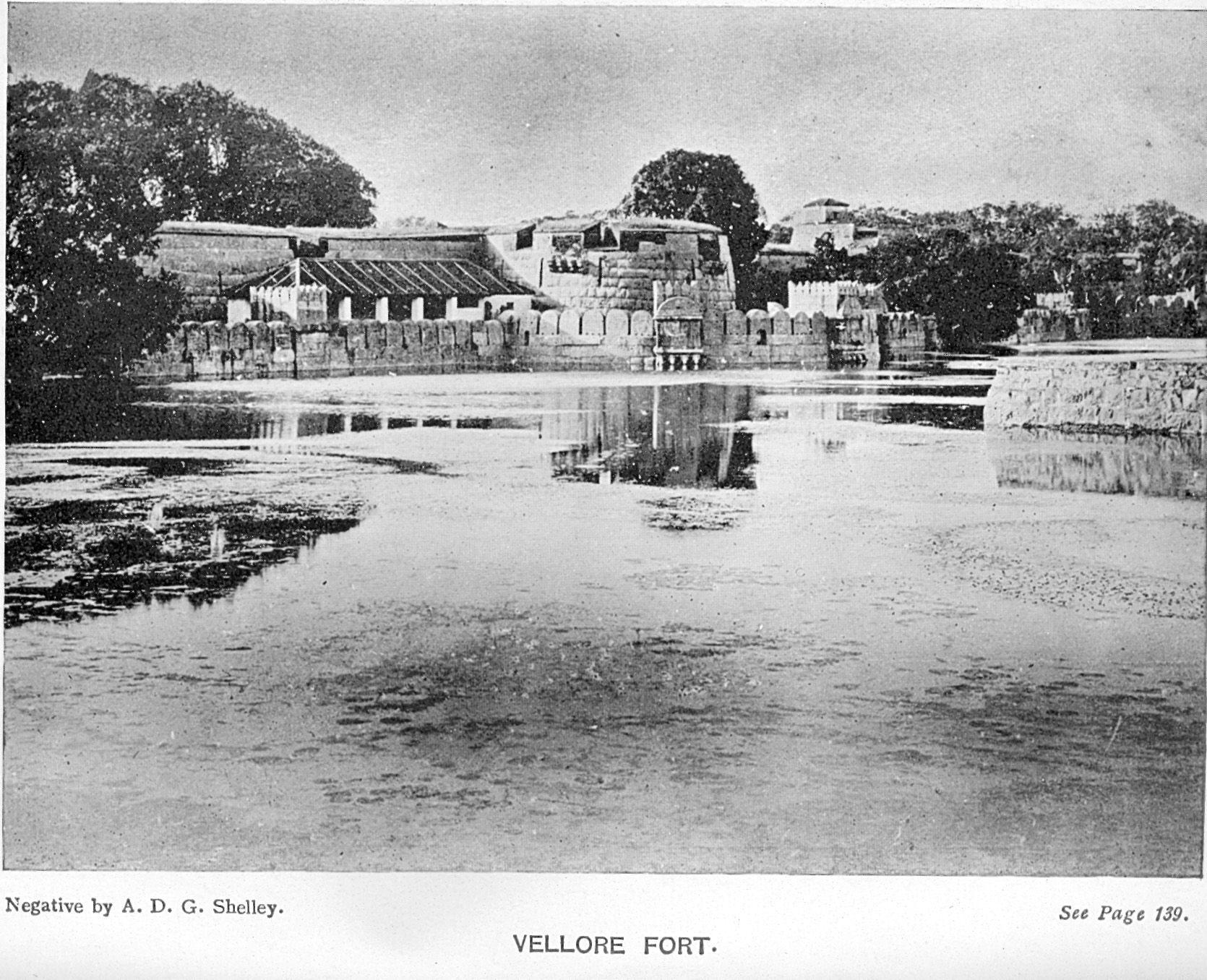
Vellore Fort in 1913

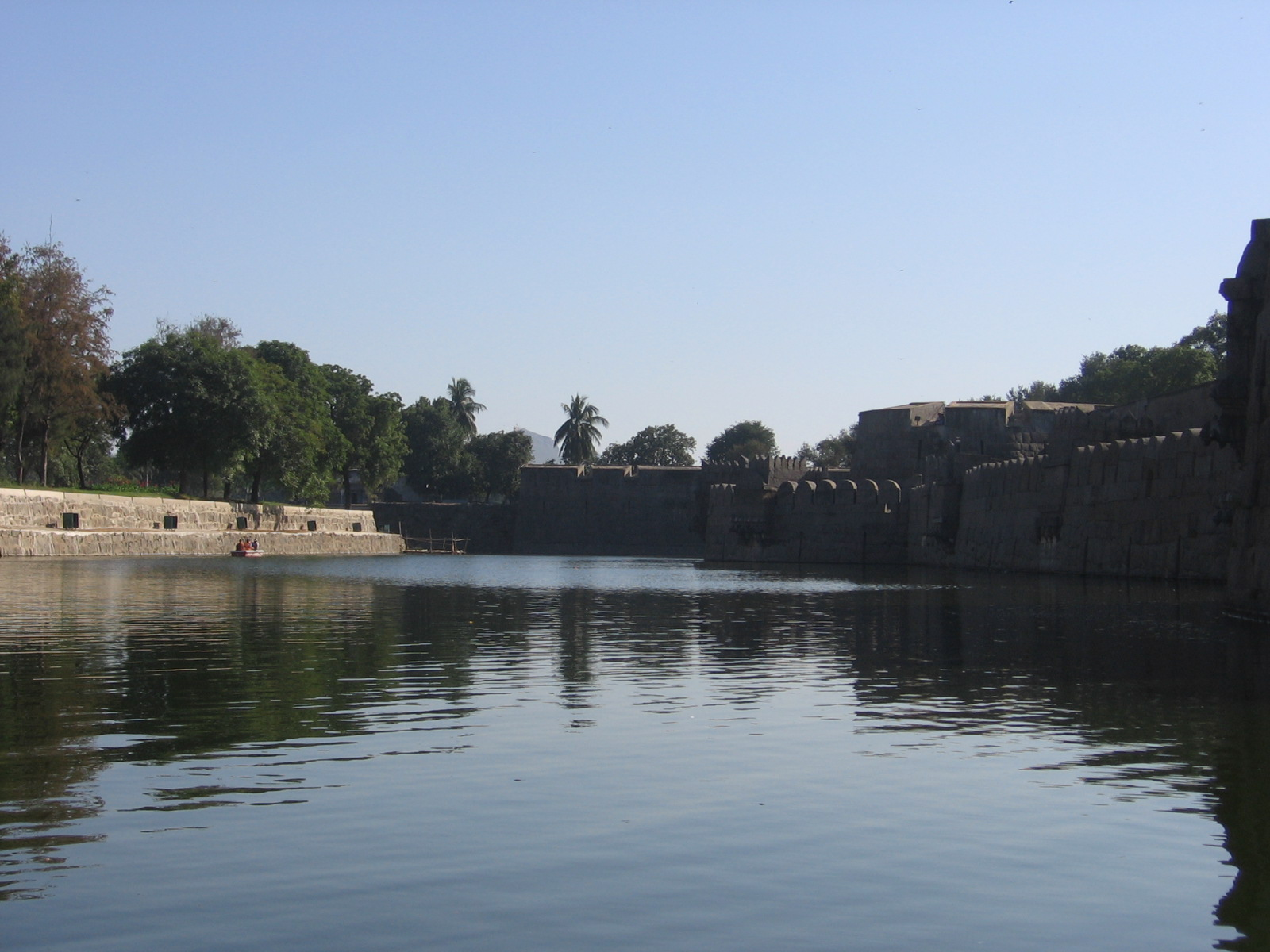
Vellore Fort Moat

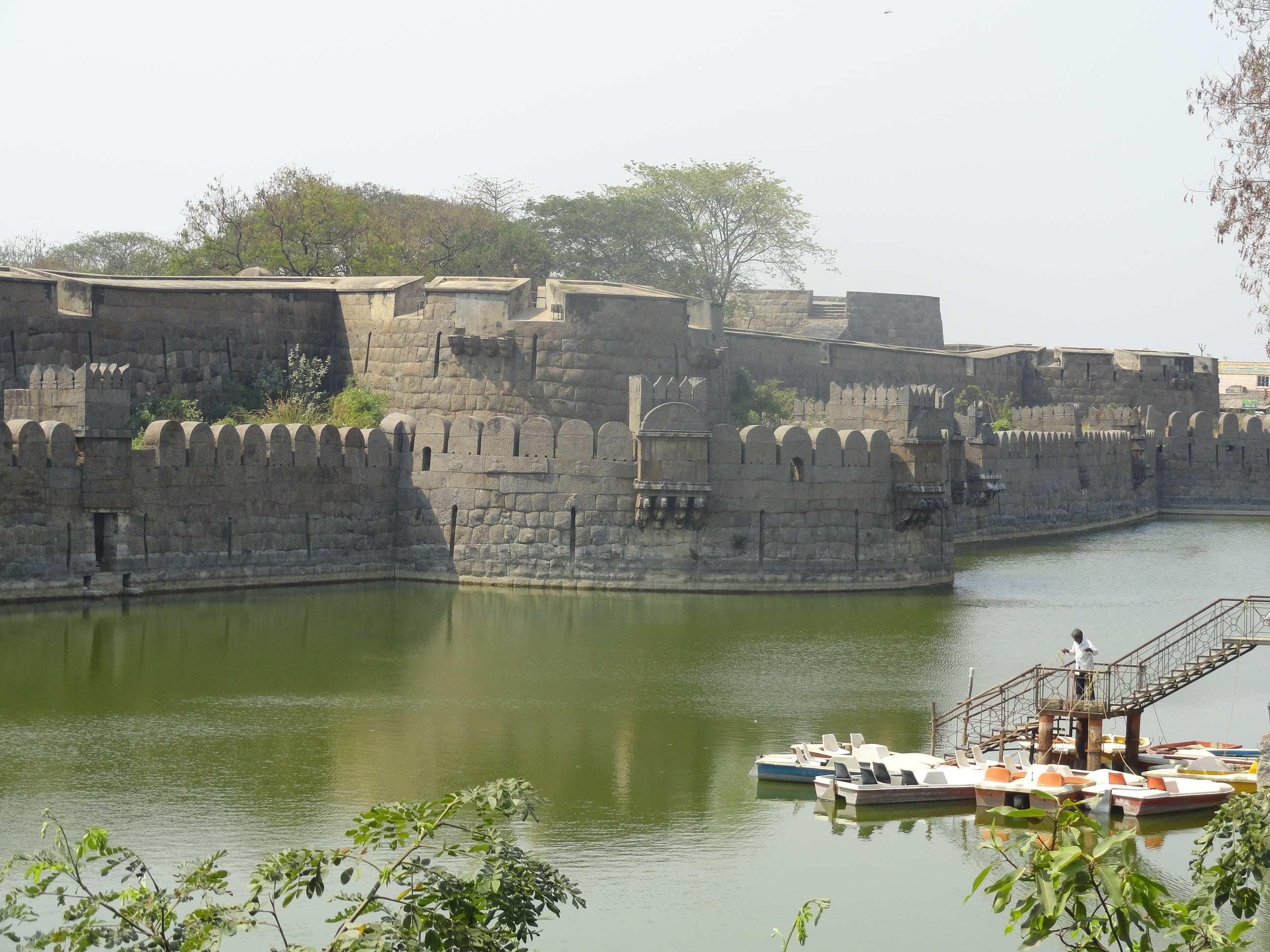
View of moat at Vellore Fort

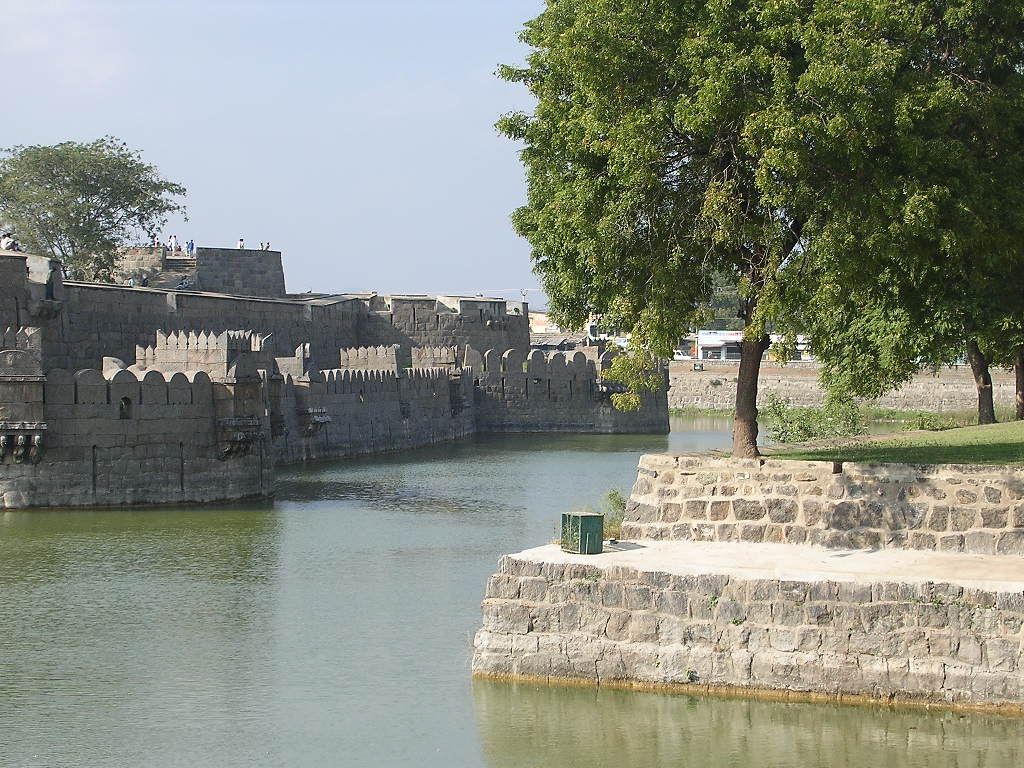
Vellore Fort

=== Government Museum ===
Government museum is located inside the Vellore fort in lakshmanswami town hall. It is a multipurpose museum having a great collection of different types of artifacts like archeology, history, geology and botany also. The museum is open all days except government holidays. Museum has 2896 exhibits, both displayed and reserved. Museum has 8 galleries which are District Gallery, Stone sculpture Gallery, Pre-History-Philately Gallery, Paintings Gallery, Zoology Gallery, Bronze Gallery, Coins Gallery and Anthropology Gallery.

=== Science Park ===
Vellore Science Park (also known as Vellore District Science Centre) located in sathuvachari east part of the Vellore City. This science centre is among the four centres in Tamil Nadu developed by Tamil Nadu Science and Technology centre. It has number of galleries including on environment; leather and physical science. Objective of the science park is to enable children learn science through play method.

Science Park here had made it possible for the students and general public to view comet ISON with its telescopic facility on 28 November 2013. Science Park also conducts summer camps for students teaching them on physics, chemistry, maths, biology, environmental sciences, yoga, psychology and also practical experiments.

Proposal of 3D theatre at Vellore Science Park was initiated in March 2013. If plans go expected, Vellore will be the only city other than Chennai in Tamil Nadu to have this facility. It would be an added attraction for students which would make watching various scientific phenomena come alive, almost real and the movies will be sourced from National Museum of Natural History, USA, would deal with concepts of cloning, life cycles, dinosaur, exploration of life, space mission, astronomy, solar system, mystic animals, and the lives of scientists.

=== Vainu Bappu Observatory ===
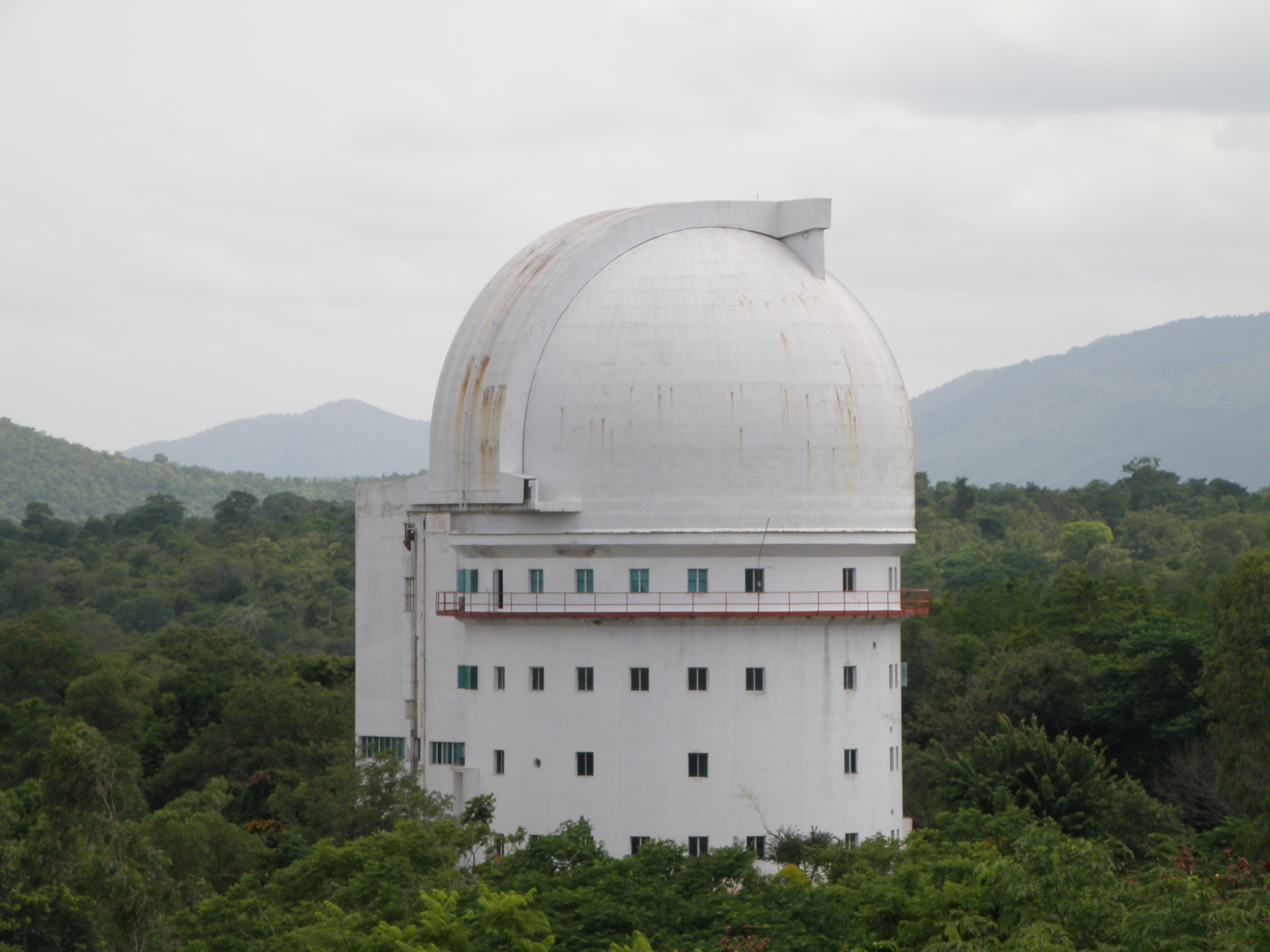
Vainu Bappu Telescope of 2.3m diameter, the largest in Asia

The Vainu Bappu Observatory, or VBO for short, is an astronomical observatory owned and operated by Indian Institute of Astrophysics. It is located in the Javadi Hills Kavalur, near Vaniyambadi & Yelagiri and it's around 70 km from Vellore City.

Vainu Bappu Observatory (also known as Kavalur Astronomical observatory) is home to the Vainu Bappu Telescope, the largest telescope in Asia. It has a diameter of 2.3 meters and was first used in 1986. Along with the Vainu Bappu telescope, the observatory has two other telescopes.

=== Amirthi Zoological Park ===
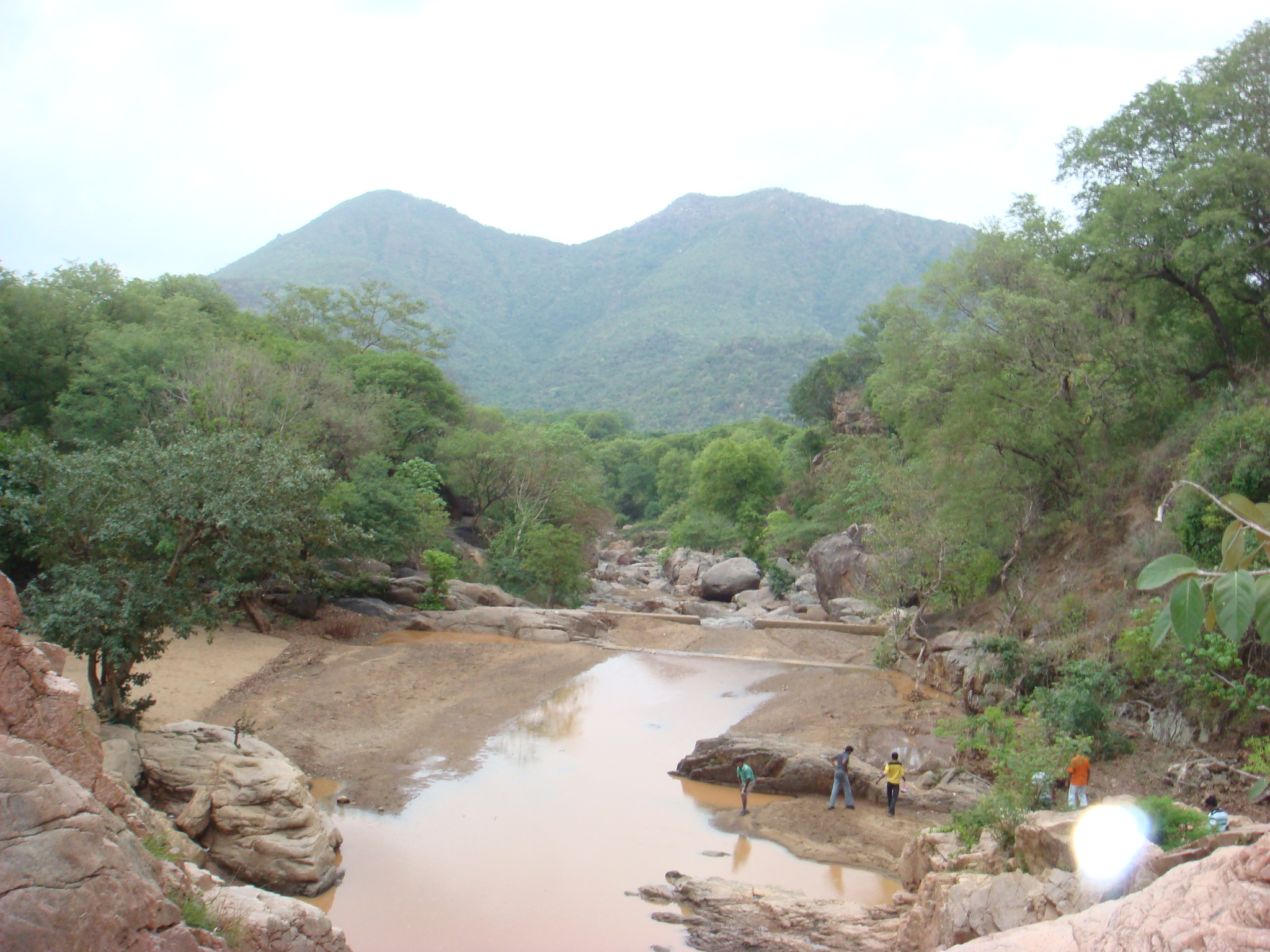
Amirthi Forest and Zoological Park

Amirthi Forest & Zoological Park is situated under the Javadi hills of Tellai across the Amirthi river which is 25 km from Vellore. The area of the park is 25 hectares and one can find beautiful water falls. Half of this jungle is cleared to serve as a tourist spot while the other half is developed as a wildlife sanctuary. Animals at the park include spotted deer, mongoose, hedgehog, foxes, reason monkeys, red headed parrots, love birds, tortoises, peacock, crocodiles, wild cats, eagles, ducks, pigeons, wild parrots, rabbits, and pythons.

=== Religious Places ===
==== Jalakandeswarar Temple ====
The 16th-century Jalagandeeswarar Temple, dedicated to Jalagandeeswar, is noted for its stone sculptures, which provide an example of the craftsmanship of artisans of that period. The temple was long used as an arsenal, and remained without a deity, although several years ago it was sanctified with an idol of Lord Shiva.

==== Mosques & Churches ====
Assumption Cathedral and the 150-year-old St. John's Church inside the fort are among the churches in Vellore. The Big Mosque, in the heart of the city, houses the largest Arabic college in India.

==== Srilakshmi Golden Temple ====
The golden temple of Sripuram (Tamil: ஸ்ரீபுரம்) is a spiritual park situated at the foot of a small range of green hills in a place known as "Malaikodi" in the city of Vellore. The temple is located between Vellore-Odugathur state highway and at the southern end of the city of Vellore, at Tirumalaikodi. The temple is located on 100 acres of land and has been constructed by Vellore-based Sri Narayani Peedam, headed by spiritual leader Sri Sakthi Amma also known as Narayani Amma. The temple with gold covering, has intricate work done by artisans specializing in temple art using gold.

Sripuram design represents a star-shaped path (Sri chakra), positioned in the middle of the green landscape, with a length of over 1.8 km. One has to walk along the star path to reach the temple in the middle, which has messages laid out along the path to the temple from Sri Sakthi Amma, Gita, Bible and Quran. When one enters the Sripuram, their focus is just on the temple. But when they leave, they cannot do so without taking some messages and gaining some wisdom.

==== Vallimalai Sri Thenvenkatachalapathy temple ====
"Sri ThenVenkatachalapathy Temple" is a Vedic temple in the down of the Vallimalai hill town near thiruvalam in Vellore district of Tamil Nadu, India. It was located in Vellore district of Tamil Nadu. Vallimai is present 25 km from Vellore and 12 km from thiruvalam. According to history when vishnu was in deep meditation lakshmi came like deer and she plays in front of him. At that time vishnu's meditation was dispersed and he saw that deer. Due to his holy glory a beautiful daughter was born both of them left their daughter for the sake of their devotee king. After that king found the child in Vaḷḷikiḻaṅku field so, she called as valli. In [4] the idol is Swayambumurthi now he is growing on..... also the special in that temple was for of devotees got child after praying in this temple.

==== Sri Danvantri Arogya Peedam, God of Medicine ====
"Sri Danvantri Arogya Peedam" located near Walajapet (30 km from CMC Vellore), Lord Sri Danvantri is worshipped as god of medicine and here 24 hours prayer performed for global welfare and regular homams are performed for Logashemam (Global welfare), along with Lord Danvantri 75 unique deities (Lord Dattatreya, Lord Swarna Akarshana Bhairava, Lord Kuberan, 468 Siddhas) had been installed here, also Lord Danvantri has been sanctified in the garbagraha on the double-decker structure. For a few feet beneath the actual peedam upon which Idol rests, there is a deep hole lined with granite stones. A copper pipe, about seven inches diameter, has been placed at the centre of the hole and the 54 crore mantras have been tightly packed around this pipe. This copper pipe serves as carrier of the vibrations that are constantly reverberating from the strength of the mantras and spreads the energy.

Danvantri Arogya Peedam, being a universal place of healing and Lord Danvantri Himself being the Doctor of Medicines, God of Health and Doctor of Doctors, there are no limitations or contradictions based on the perspective of religion, caste and creed.

The purpose of placing the mantras beneath the peedam and idol is that the collective powers of each of these personal faiths brings forth an effect of profuse magnitude and strength.

==== Gallery ====
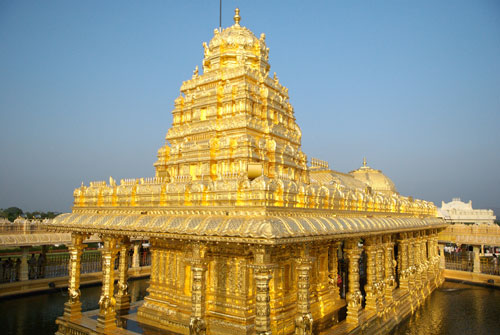
The Golden temple of Mahalakshmi

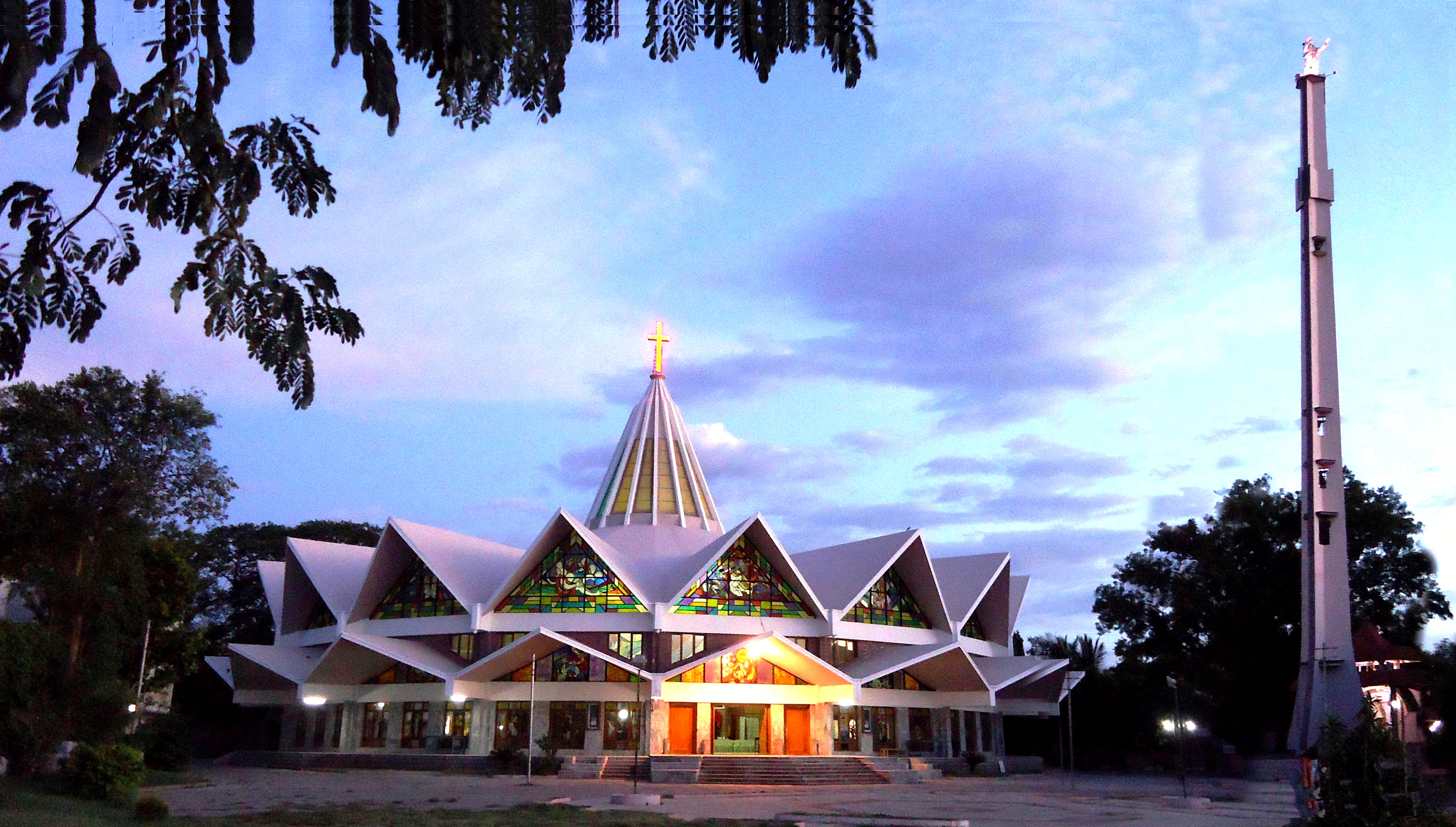
Assumption Cathedral

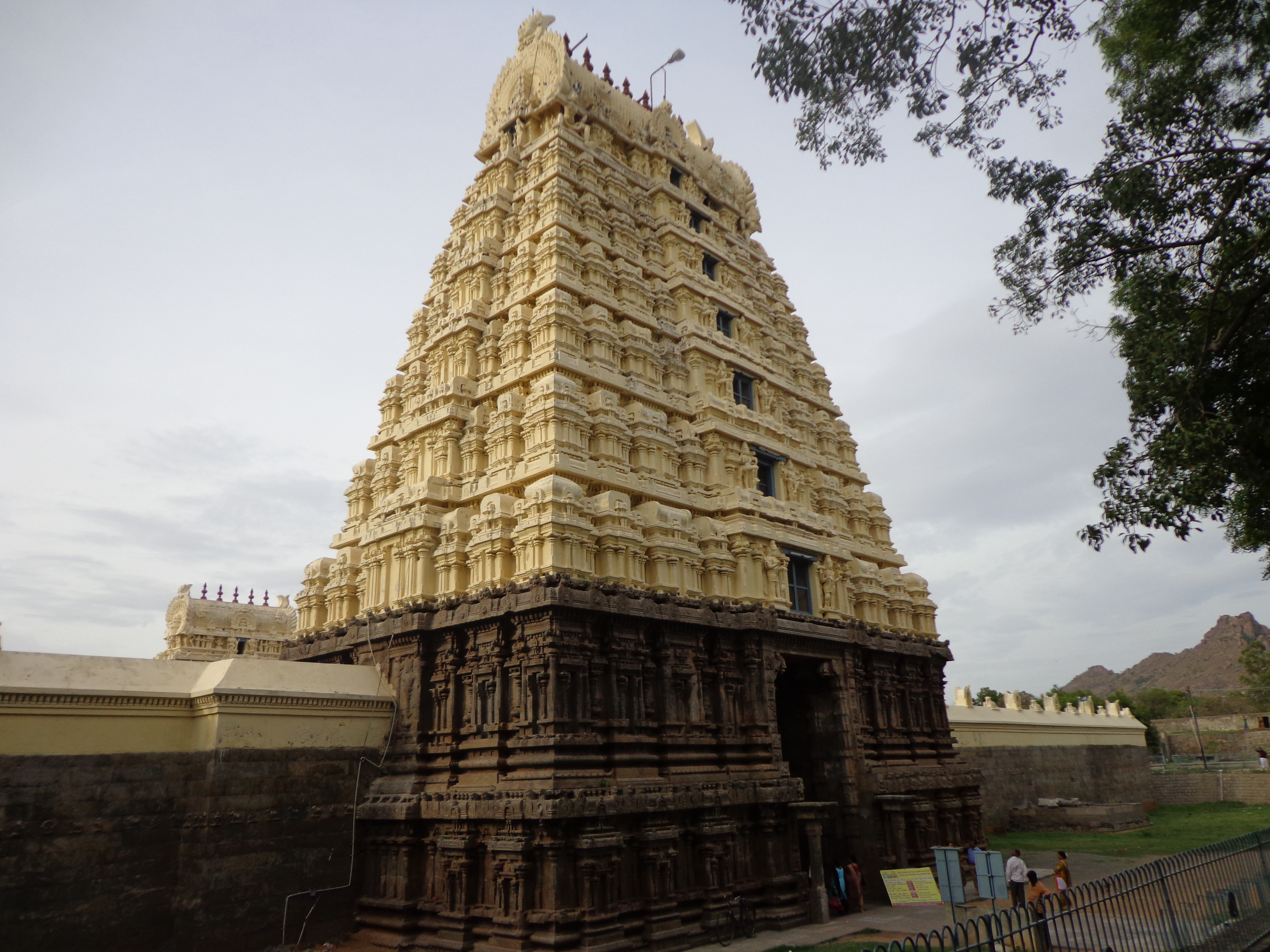
Temple inside Vellore Fort

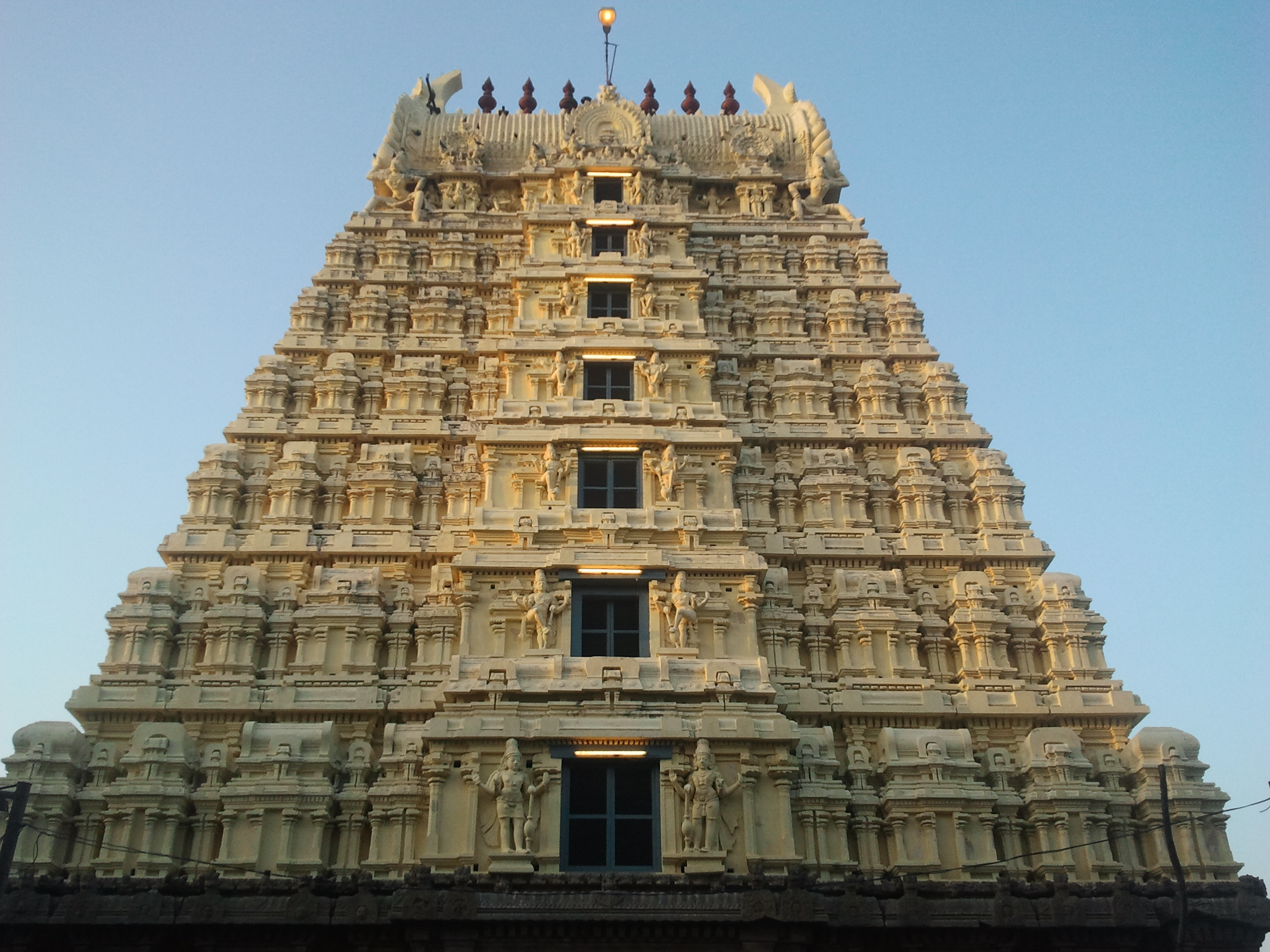
Sri Jalagandeeswarar Temple

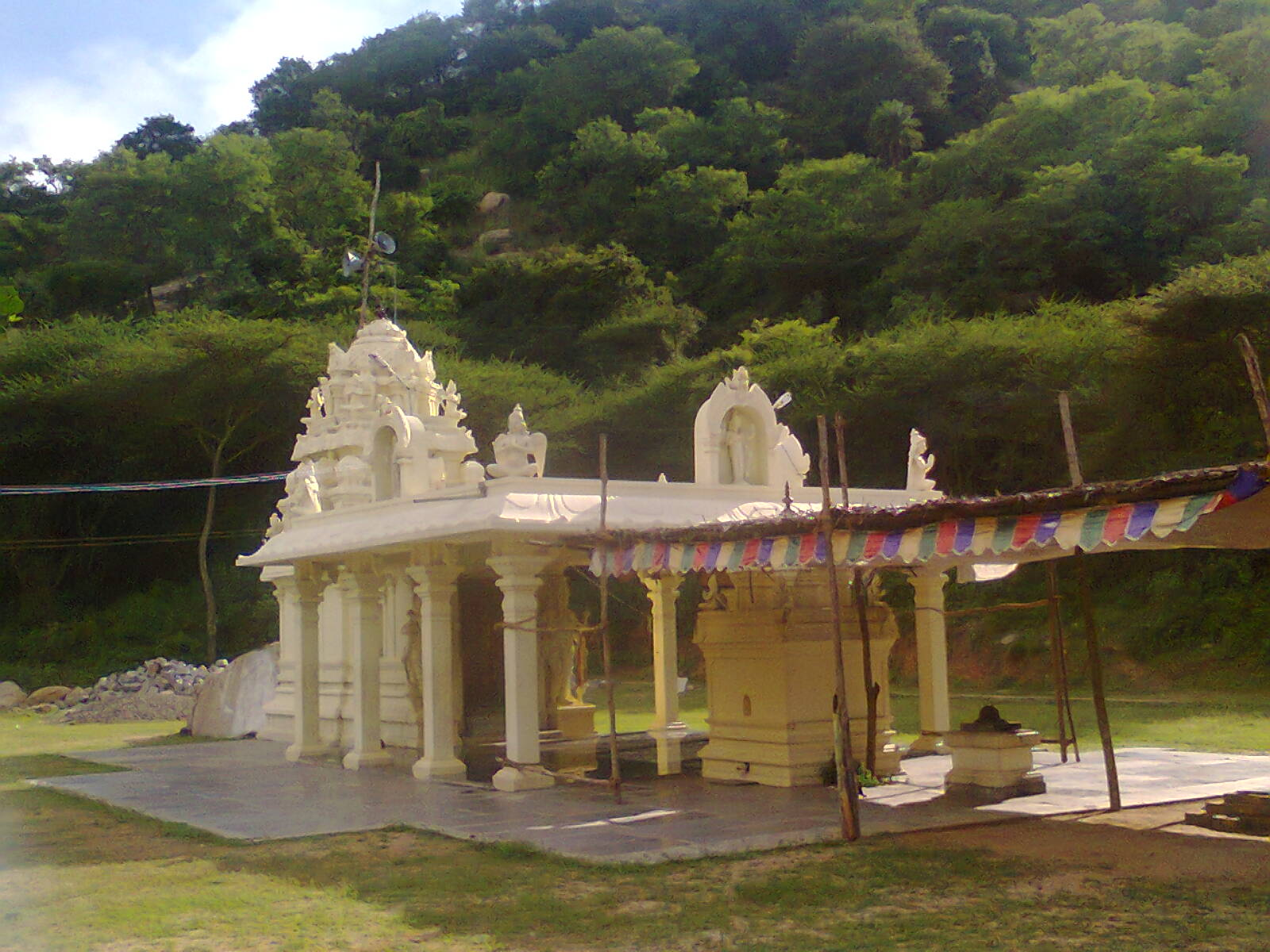
this is overview of the temple sri thenvenkatachalapathy in vallimalai

=== Yelagiri Hills ===
Yelagiri is a hill station in Tirupattur district, India, situated off the Vaniyambadi-Tirupattur road. Located at an altitude of 1,410.6 metres above Mean Sea Level and spread across 30 km^{2}, the Yelagiri village (also spelled Elagiri at times) is surrounded by orchards, rose-gardens, and green valleys.

The Yelagiri hill station is not as developed as other hill stations in Tamil Nadu. However, the district administration has now taken up the task of developing Yelagiri Hills into a tourist destination by promoting adventure sports such as paragliding and rock climbing. Places of attraction in yelagiri are artificial lake, Jalagamparai Waterfalls, YMCA Camp centre and YASA (Yelagiri Adventure Sports Association) which runs paragliding and other adventure sports.

==== Gallery ====
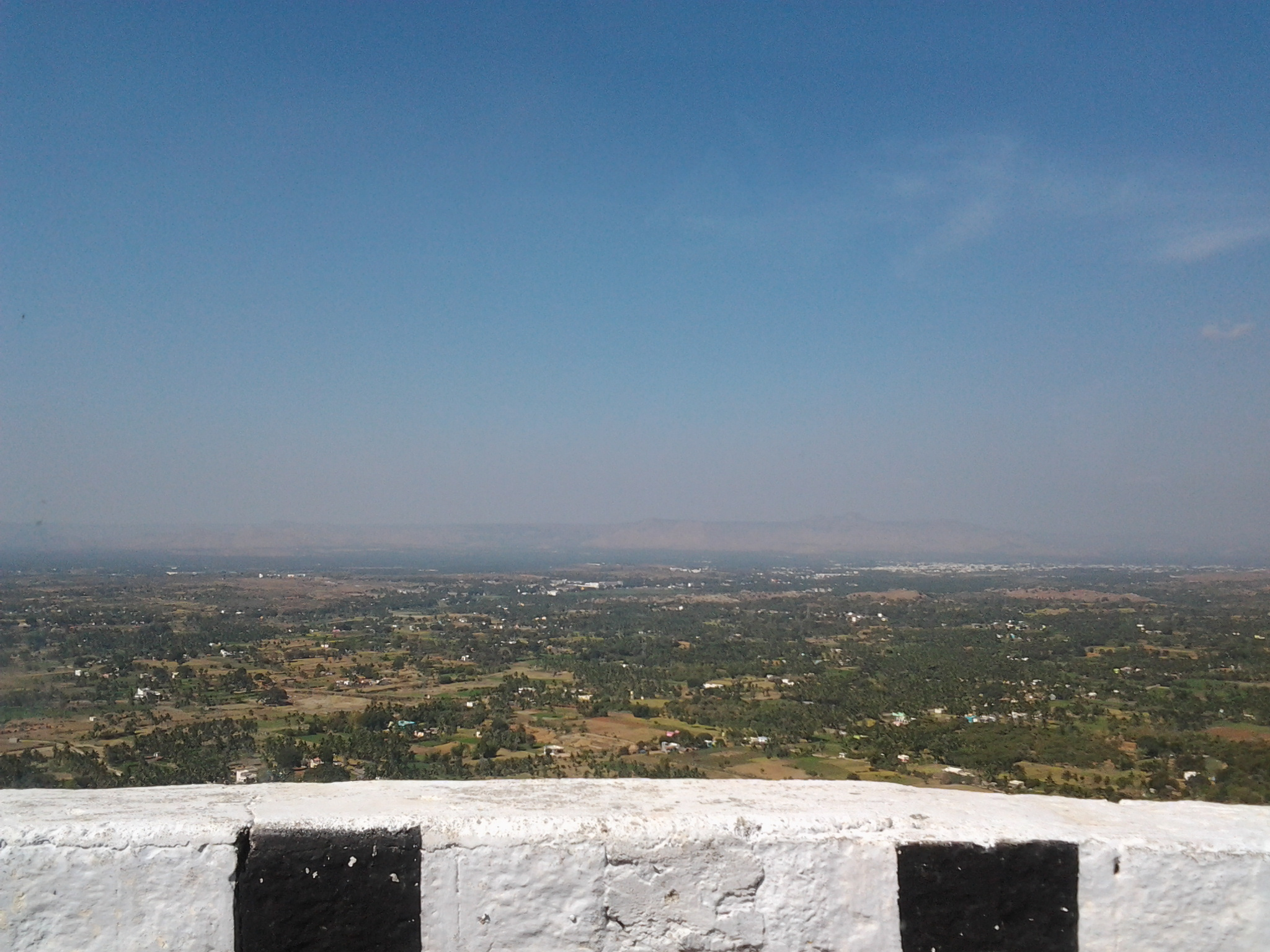
View of Vaniyambadi town from Yelagiri Hill station

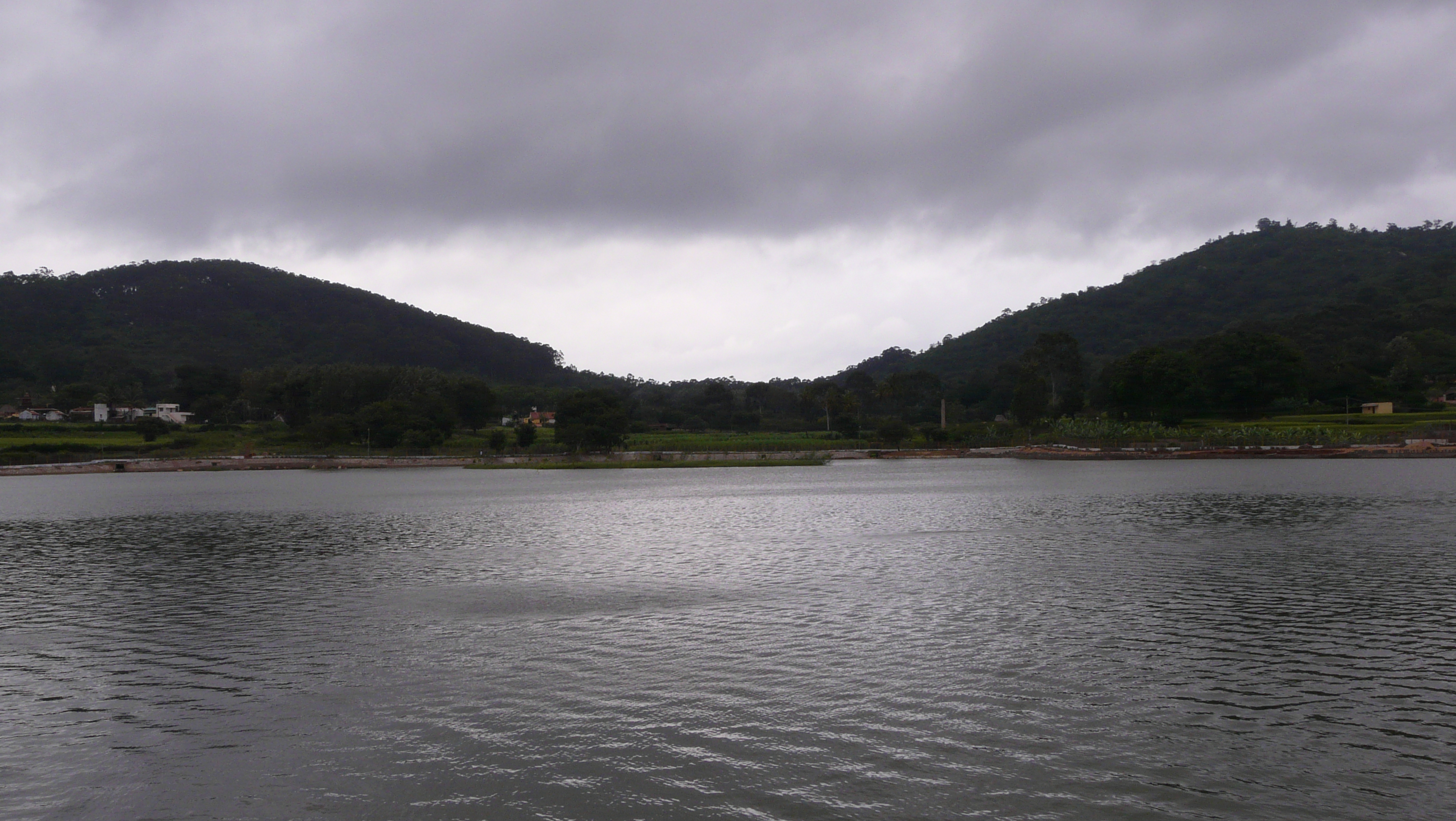
Yelagiri Lake

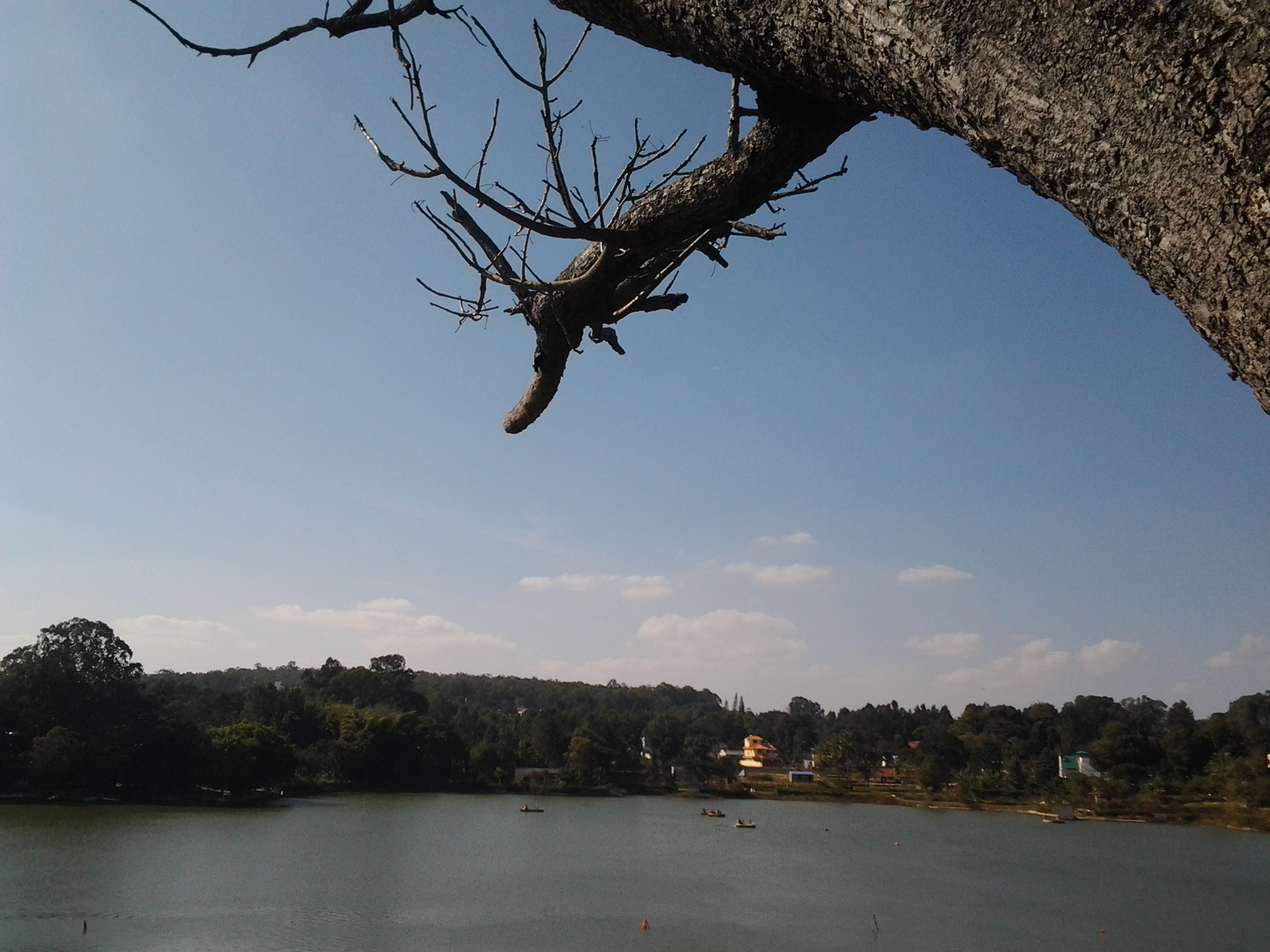
Yelagiri Lake View

=== Parks ===
Several parks are there in the city such as Fort Park & Periyar park. Periyar Park has one km long walking path, roller-skating ring, battery-operated mini motorcycles and birds such as ducks, parrots, love birds, ostrich and guinea fowls are being grown in the park.

=== Shopping ===
Major shopping regions in the city are Anna Salai, Main Bazaar, Long Bazaar, Filter Bed Road, Ida Scudder Road, Katpadi Road and Gandhi road. Several large textiles showroom such as Chennai Silks, Pachaiyappas Silks, Max Fashion, Pantaloons, Reliance Retail, Planet Fashion and also several branded showrooms such as Blackberrys, Puma, UCB, Adidas, Levis, Derby, Peter England, Raymonds, Fabindia, Johnplayers, Crocodile and many others available along the Anna Salai.

Several Branded jewellery showrooms such as TataGold Plus, Joyalukkas, Kalyan Jewellers, Khazana Nathella, Jewel one, Khazana, Champalal and many others are available along Anna Salai.

=== Entertainment ===
City has many theatres like Alankar, Thirumalai, Apsara, Vishnu, Aascar, PVR Velocity, galaxy, inox selvam square and Blue Cinema which opened recently.

== See also ==
- Sajra and Gojra Forts, Vellore
