= Nexus Centre City Mall =

Coordinates: 12.31816°N 76.66549°E

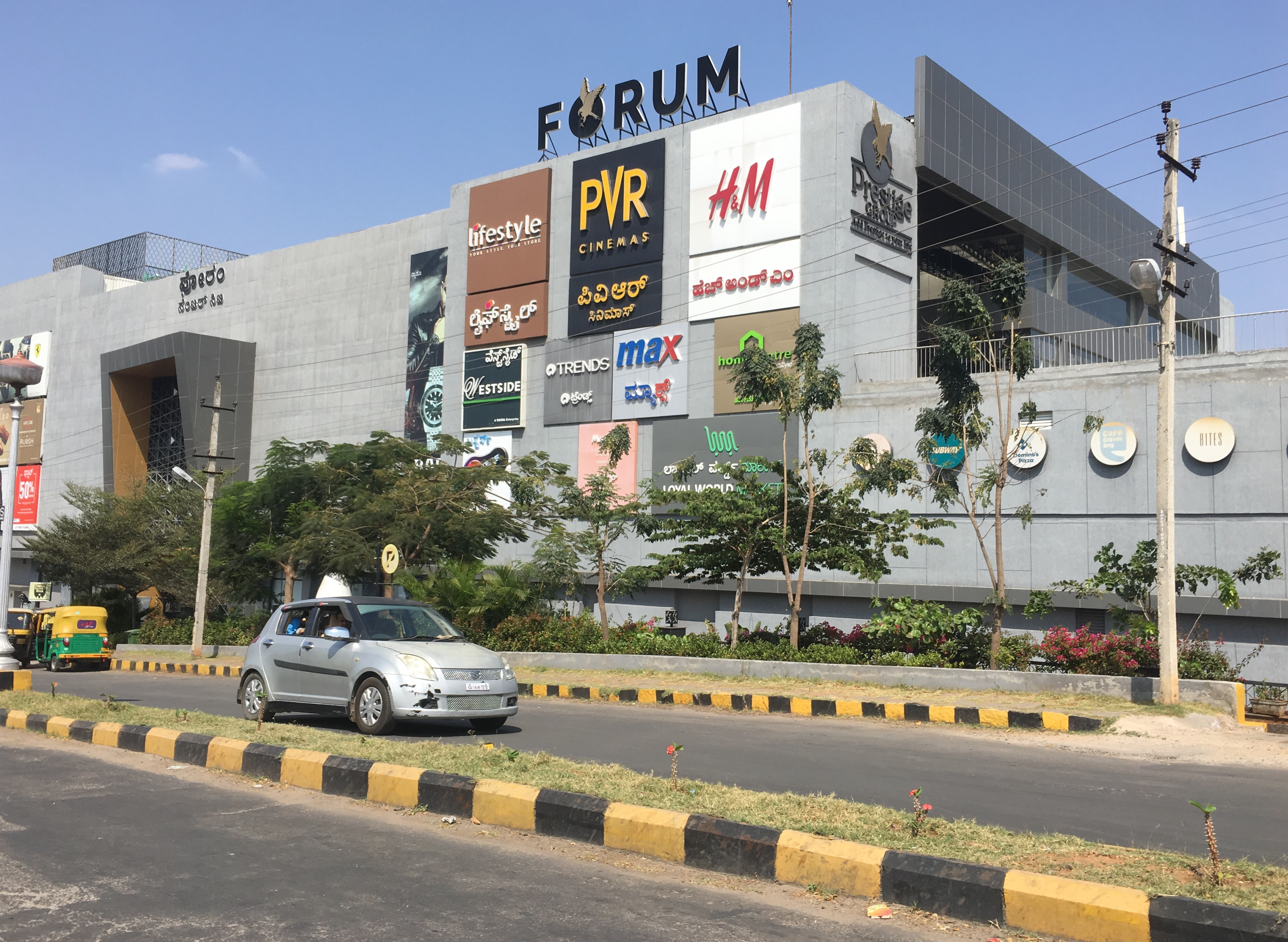
- Front view of the Nexus Mall
- Location: Mysore, Karnataka, India
- Address: Nexus Centre City, No.8 & N-5, Hyder Ali road, Nazarbad Mohalla, Mysuru - 570010
- Opened: 9 January 2018
- Developer: Prestige Group
- Num. of stores: 100+
- Num. of anchor tenants: 4
- Floor area: 374,700 sq ft (34,810 m^{2})
- Floors: 5
- Parking: 2
- Website: www.nexusselecttrust.com/nexus-centre-city

Nexus Centre City Mall is a shopping mall located in the South Indian city of Mysore, Karnataka. It is the largest in Mysuru. The mall is owned and operated by Nexus Select REIT and is located in the Nazarbad area of Mysore.

Nexus Centre City Mall houses many international brands' showrooms under one roof, including those of H&M, Apple, Max Fashion, William Penn, and many other. The mall is open Mondays through Sundays, including on public holidays from 10:00 AM IST and closes at 10:00 PM IST.

== History ==
Nexus Centre City was opened to the public in February 2018. It is the largest mall in Mysore.

== Location ==
Nexus Centre City Mall is located at No. 5, Hyder Ali Road, Nazarbad Mohalla, Mysuru.

== Facilities ==
The mall has shopping area of 3,47,000 sqft and houses 100+ brands. It has a 6 screen PVR Multiplex, Many brands such as H&M, American Tourister, Crocs, Max have their outlets in the mall. It houses a Loyal world supermarket, unisex salon and spas. Many eateries are available in the food court including Hatti Kaapi, Domino's Pizza, McDonald's, KFC etc. It also has gaming arcade for kids and for adults under one roof. The mall has a panoramic scenic view of Chamundi Hill.
