= Babyshop =

Children's retail chain

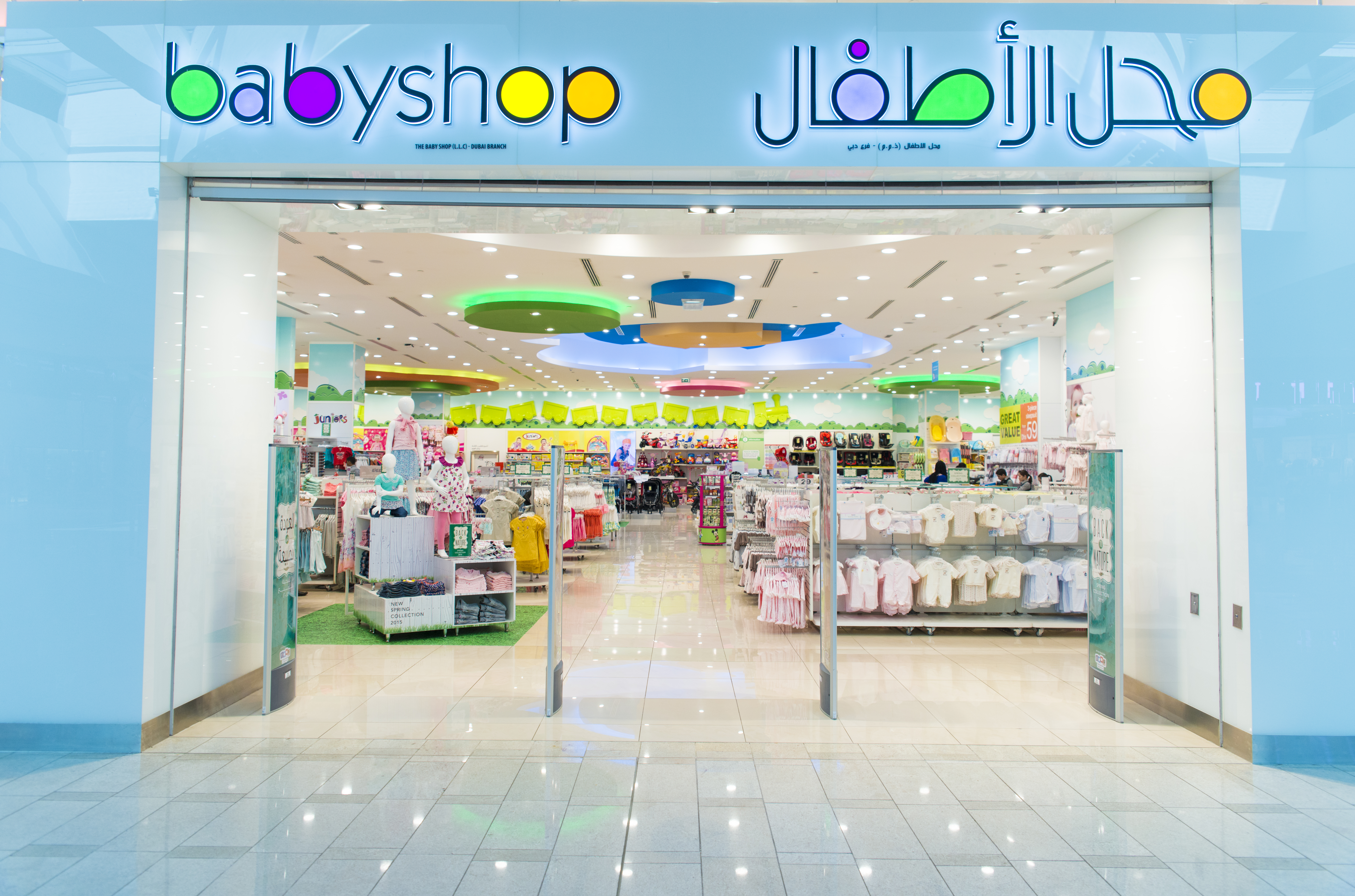
- Industry: Retail
- Founded: 1973 in Bahrain
- Founder: Micky Jagtiani
- Headquarters: Dubai, United Arab Emirates
- Number of locations: 250+ (2025)
- Area served: Middle East; Africa; India; Southeast Asia
- Key people: Ruban Shanmugarajah (CEO)
- Products: Baby and kids clothing; Toys; Nursery furniture; Travel gear; Baby care products; Diapers
- Parent: Landmark Group
- Website: babyshopstores.com

Babyshop is a children's retail chain owned by the Dubai-based Landmark Group. Opened in Bahrain in 1973 by Micky Jagtiani, it was his first retail business and became the foundation of Landmark Group.

The chain sells clothing, toys, nursery furniture, travel equipment and other products for children. Babyshop operates both standalone stores and as a retail concept within Landmark Group's Centrepoint format. In 2025, its chief executive said the chain had more than 250 stores across the Middle East, Africa, Southeast Asia and India.

== History ==
=== Founding and Gulf expansion ===
Babyshop was opened in 1973 in Bahrain by Micky Jagtiani, who had previously worked in London and moved to Bahrain to run a shop selling baby products and accessories. According to Forbes, he started the business with about US$6,000 that he had inherited following deaths in his family. The shop became the basis of Landmark Group. In 1990, Babyshop opened its first store outside Bahrain, in Sharjah in the United Arab Emirates, and the chain expanded across the Gulf Cooperation Council states during the following decade. In August 2005, Landmark Group introduced the Centrepoint department store format, which brought Babyshop together with the group's Splash, Shoe Mart and Lifestyle brands. By 2015, Centrepoint operated as a multi-brand format housing these brands; The National reported that Babyshop and Splash were its largest revenue contributors.

=== Entry into China ===
In September 2007, Landmark Group entered the Chinese market with a Babyshop store of about 14,000 square feet (1,300 m2) in the Hongqiao area of Shanghai, the group's first retail outlet in the country.

=== Africa, South Asia and the wider Middle East ===
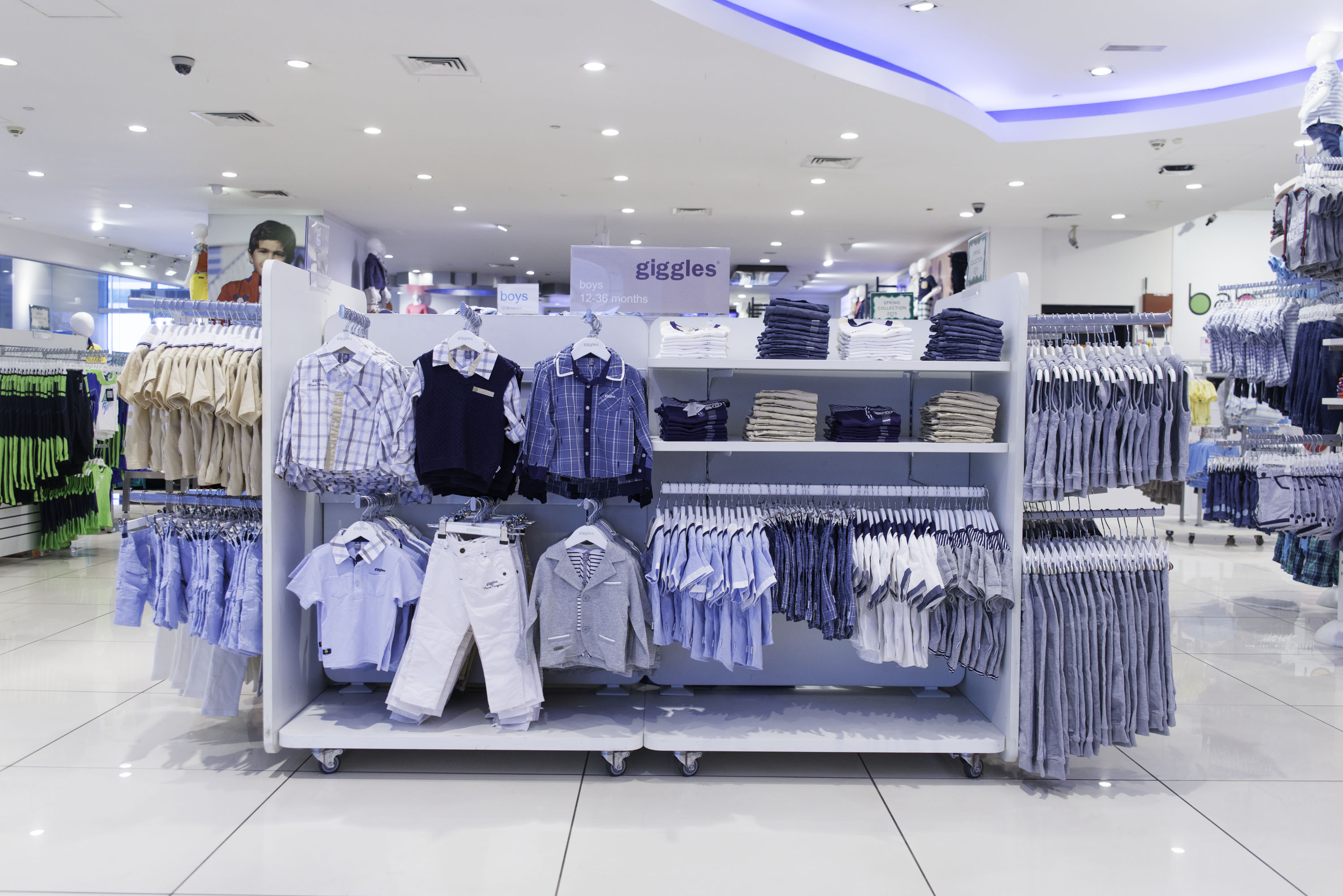
Babyshop Store

In September 2011, Landmark Group announced a five-year investment programme of about 250 million dirhams a year to expand Babyshop, including new stores in existing markets and entry into North and East Africa.

By January 2013, Babyshop operated 172 stores across the Gulf, Africa and South Asia, including four stores in Pakistan, and was considering further expansion in North Africa. In May 2014, the company opened what it described as its 200th store in the Middle East and North Africa, in Irbid, Jordan.

By February 2016, Babyshop had more than 235 stores in 19 countries and said it was working towards 300. In 2016, Babyshop entered Nigeria and reported opening 20 stores during the year.

=== Recent history ===
Babyshop had entered Thailand before expanding into Malaysia in 2018. In Malaysia, the chain opened five outlets during its first year in the market and stocked its in-house labels alongside third-party children's brands. By 2023, Babyshop operated 16 stores in Malaysia. In November 2024, Landmark announced a US$1 billion, three-year plan to open 400 stores across the Gulf, India and Southeast Asia, which included introducing Babyshop to India. The chain opened its first Indian store in January 2025, at Express Avenue mall in Chennai.

In May 2026, Babyshop introduced a refreshed brand identity.

== Operations ==
=== Products ===
Babyshop sells products for children from infancy to the early teenage years, with the age range varying by category. Its range covers children's clothing, toys, nursery furniture, feeding products, strollers and car seats. Babyshop's in-house labels include Juniors, Giggles and Eligo, which The Edge Malaysia reported in 2018 made up the bulk of the retailer's inventory. In 2021, Babyshop introduced Love Earth, an in-house children's clothing range marketed as using more sustainable materials. Textile-industry publication Yarns & Fibers described it as an organic and eco-friendly range for children from infancy to 14 years. The chain also stocks third-party children's brands including Barbie, Disney, Fisher-Price, Lego and Chicco.

=== E-commerce ===
In December 2012, Babyshop was one of the first three Landmark Group brands, alongside Emax and Splash, to launch online sales through the group's e-commerce platform.

In November 2016, Landmark Group replaced its earlier multi-brand online platform with separate websites and mobile applications for seven of its brands, including Babyshop.

In 2026, CEO Ruban Shanmugarajah said Babyshop's digital curation had expanded to include feeds, recommendation engines and personalised homepages, with merchandising informed by real-time data.

== Campaigns and publications ==
In 2015, Babyshop published Mom's Little Secret, a guide for expecting and new mothers containing more than 40 articles by parenting and healthcare contributors.

In 2018, for Mother's Day, Babyshop and the agency FP7 McCann Dubai ran "Al Umobuwah", which promoted a coined Arabic term combining the words for motherhood and fatherhood. The campaign won the Grand Prix and the Smart Spender award in the Effective Use of Brand Purpose category at the 2019 WARC Awards, the Grand Prix for Effective Channel Integration at the 2019 WARC Media Awards, and a Wood Pencil at the 2019 D&AD Awards.

In 2023, Babyshop worked with FP7 McCann and the UN refugee agency on "Frequencies of Peace", a lullaby written with input from neuroscientists and performed by the Syrian singer Ghaliaa Chaker, which was broadcast nightly on radio stations and streaming services for children affected by conflict and displacement. The campaign won the Media Grand Prix at the 2024 Dubai Lynx awards.

In 2025, Babyshop and Moorfields Eye Hospital Dubai developed "ColourCheck", a coloured-pencil set designed to help identify possible colour-vision deficiencies in children.

=== Child safety campaigns ===
Babyshop has run a child-safety awareness programme, "Child Safety First", since 2005. In 2011, working with Dubai's Roads and Transport Authority, the company fitted child seats in Dubai taxis and distributed safety material to passengers as part of a three-month campaign on child safety in vehicles. The programme was later extended to other markets; in Oman, Babyshop has run car-seat awareness activities with the Royal Oman Police, donating 200 child car seats during the campaign's fourteenth edition.
