= Airborne Parks =

Amusement parks in Chennai, India

- Product type: Trampoline and Inflatable Parks
- Current owner: Mohammed Wasif and HAC Group
- Country: India
- Tagline: Get The Bounce Back

Airborne Parks are a collection of amusement parks that include indoor inflatable and trampoline parks, which are operated in India.

== History and Parks ==
The first park (Trampoline park) was launched in October 2017 by Mohammed Wasif and HAC Group in Khader Nawaz Khan Road, Chennai, India. It takes up about 2,500 sq ft of space, and is filled with multicolour bordered square shaped trampolines. The trampoline parks have no age limit. Another park (Inflatable park) was launched in The Marina Mall Chennai in September of 2023, which is considered to be South India's first and largest trampoline park. It spans 7,200 sq ft.
