= Amirthi Zoological Park =

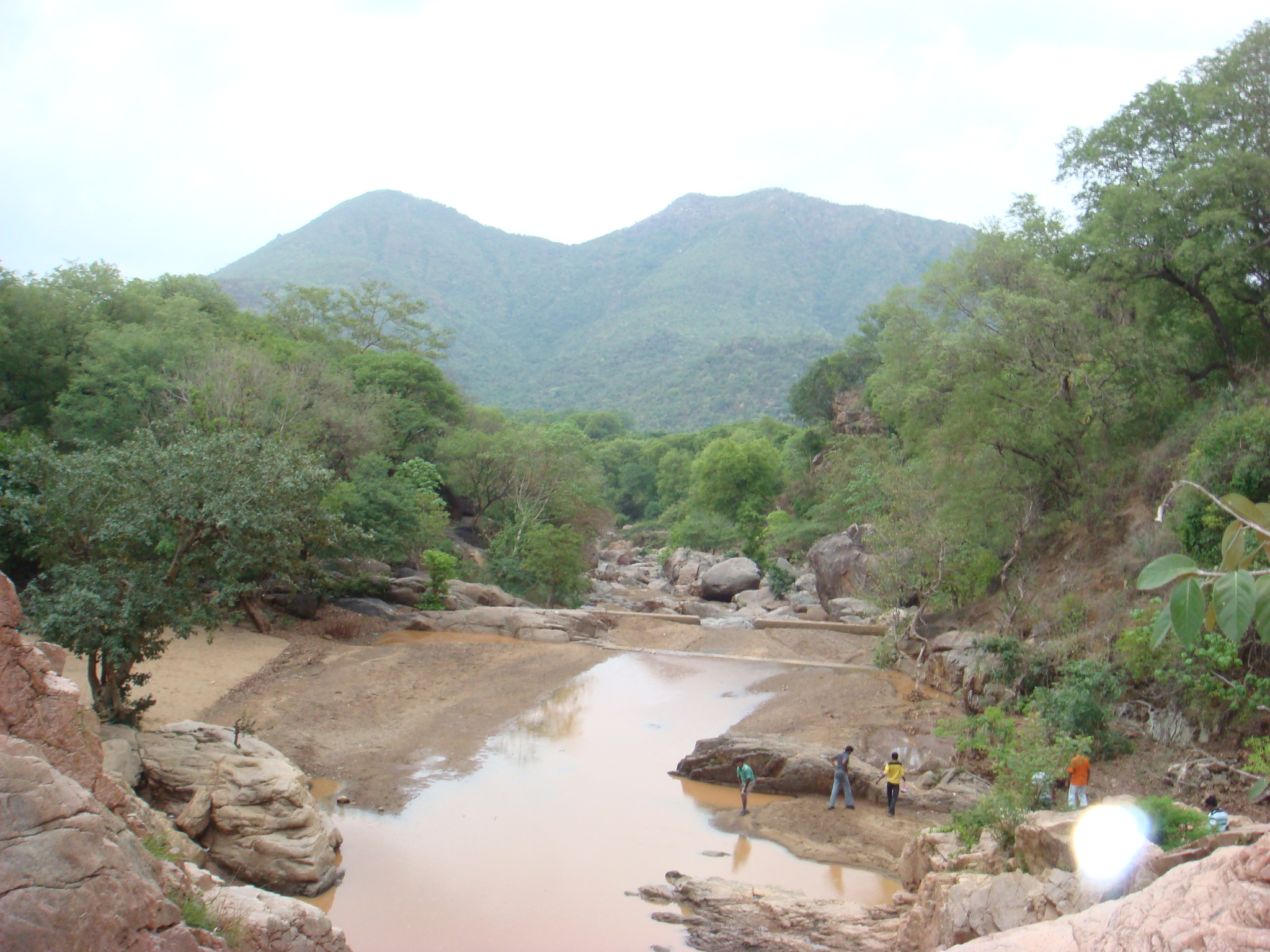
- Amirthi Forest
- Interactive map of Amirthi Zoological Park
- 12.732363°N 79.056673°E
- Date opened: 1967
- Location: Vellore District, Tamil Nadu, India
- Land area: 25 ha (62 acres)
- No. of animals: 297
- No. of species: 20
- Annual visitors: 150,513 in 2022-23
- Website: amirthizoologicalpark

Amirthi Zoological Park is a zoo in Vellore district in the Indian state of Tamil Nadu. It was opened in 1967 and is about 25 kilometres (16 mi) from the Vellore city. The park is 25 hectares in size and has waterfalls.

Amirthi is the biggest forest in Tamil Nadu. Located in the Vellore district of Tamil Nadu, Amirthi Forest is rich in a variety of fauna and flora. Half of the forest is cleared to serve as a tourist spot, while the other half is developed as a wildlife sanctuary. A trek for a kilometre leads one to a full view of the seasonal waterfall. Animals at the park include spotted deer, sambar, mongoose, porcupines, bonnet macaques, rose-ringed parakeets, budgerigars, star tortoises, peafowls, crocodiles, and Indian Rock Python

== Development and expansion ==
- On 13 September 2013, Tamil Nadu government announced that it has allocated 3.5 crore rupees for the development of Amirthi zoo. This development will provide amenities such as resting places, drinking water facilities, food joints, pathways connecting waterfalls, information centres, and watch towers.
- Tamil Nadu Forest Department has planned to upgrade the mini zoo in Amirthi into a small zoo at a total cost of 19 crore rupees. Vellore district collector also informed that Central Zoo Authority (CZA) has approved the upgradation of Amirthi mini zoo.
- Elephant camps: Amirthi forest in the Vellore Forest division will be one of the probable sites in the future, hosting rejuvenation camps for temple elephants in the state.

== See also ==
- Tourism in Vellore
