= Lifestyle (department store) =

Indian fashion brand

Lifestyle International Ltd.
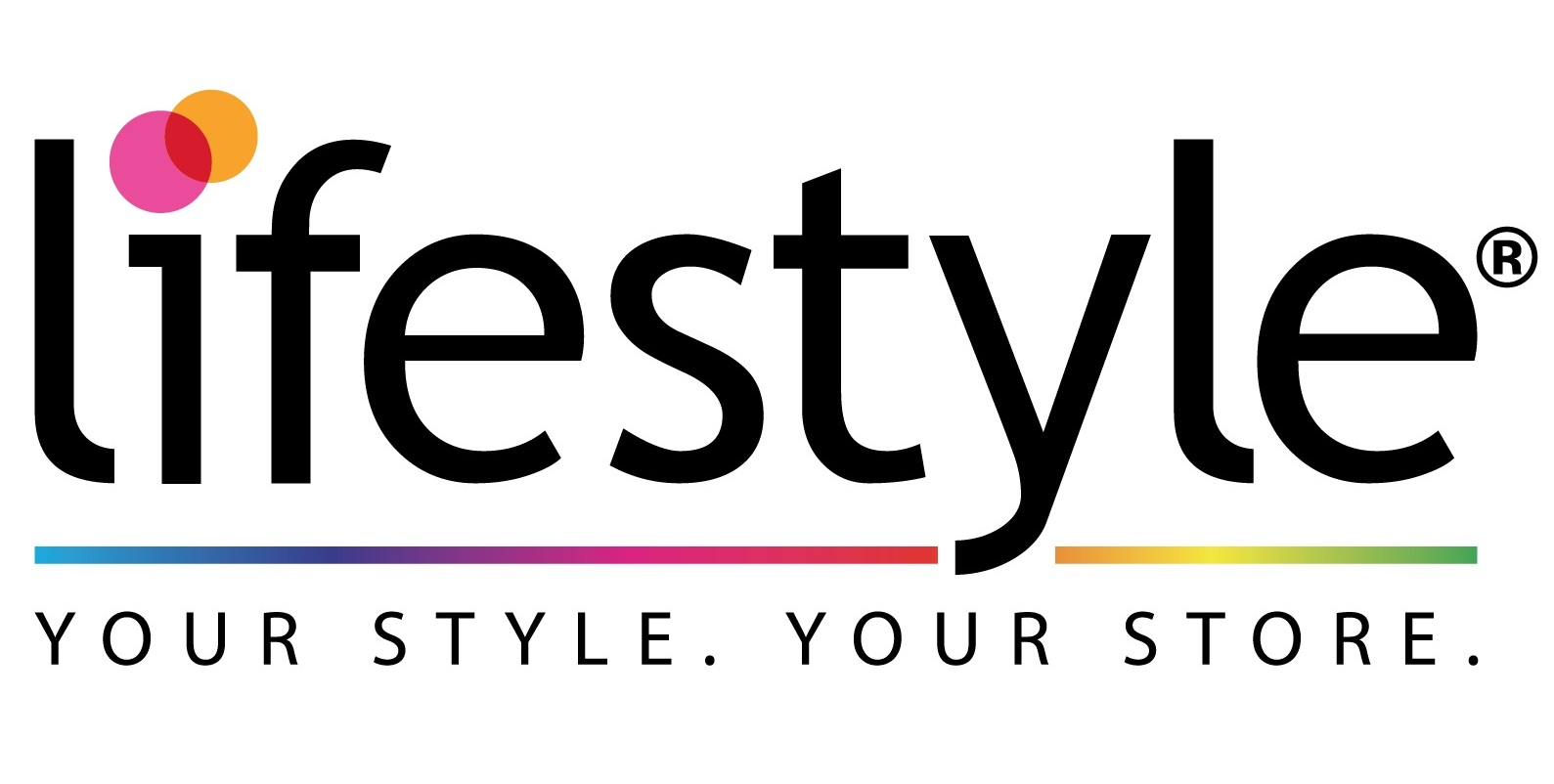
- Type: Private
- Industry: Retail, fashion, clothing
- Founded: 1999
- Headquarters: Bengaluru, Karnataka
- Area served: India
- Products: Fashion apparel
- Brands: Lifestyle, Max Fashion, Home Centre and Easybuy
- Services: Multi-brand retail, Department store
- Revenue: ▲₹11,672 crore (US$1.2 billion) (FY23)
- Net income: ▲₹700 crore (US$75 million) (FY23)
- Parent: Landmark Group
- Website: www.lifestylestores.com

Lifestyle is a fashion retail store chain owned by Dubai-based conglomerate Landmark Group. Lifestyle's inventory consists of Indian and western apparels, footwear, handbags, beauty products, and fashion accessories for men, women, and children. In India, Lifestyle International Ltd operates retail formats such as Lifestyle Stores, Home Centre, Max Fashion, and Easybuy.

Lifestyle International was ranked 10th on the list of Best Companies to Work for in 2015.

== History ==
Lifestyle opened its first store in Chennai, Tamil Nadu, India in 1999.

Lifestyle International Pvt. Ltd is led by Shital Mehta, who is the managing director of the company.

Landmark Group's business in India, which started with the Lifestyle stores, has now expanded to include Home Centre, Max, and Easybuy. The Group's foray into e-commerce in India began in January 2016 with Landmarkshops.in, which was replaced by three separate brand sites and apps for Lifestyle, Home Centre and Max in January 2017.

Lifestyle's 55th store was opened on 6 September 2016, at Bangalore's Phoenix Marketcity, Whitefield. It was inaugurated by Bollywood actor and Melange's brand ambassador, Kangana Ranaut. Another store was inaugurated at the Waltair Uplands in Vishakhapatnam by actor Rana Daggubati on 24 March 2017.

== Operations ==
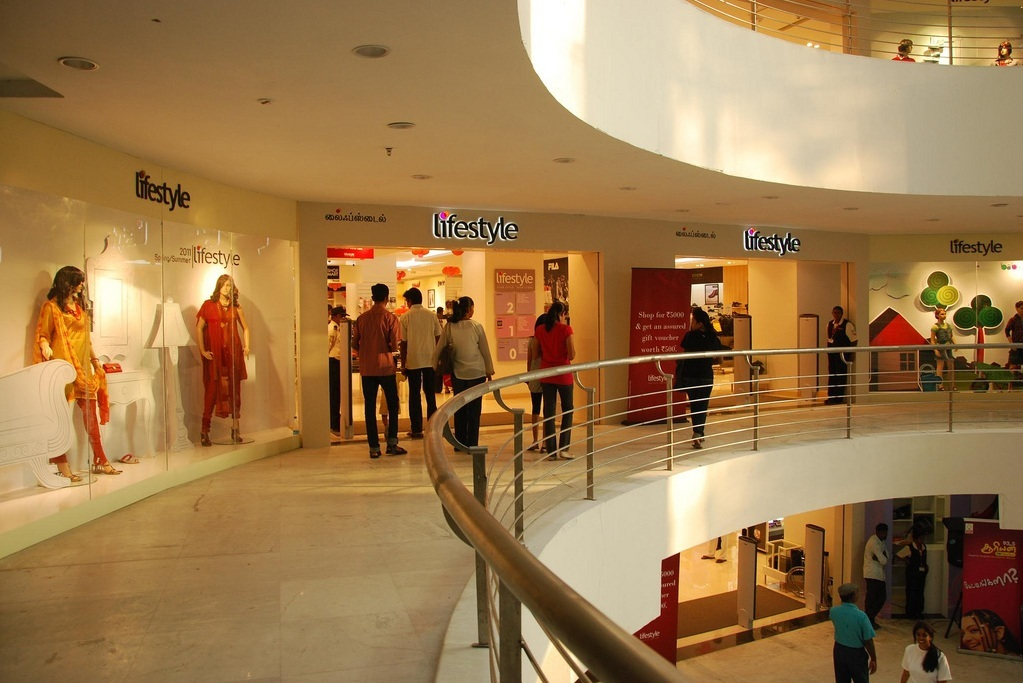
A Lifestyle store in Coimbatore

The Lifestyle stores have a multi-level store format, which is normally spread over two or three floors that provides a square line-of-sight, allowing customers to view the product sections in a single glance. Each Lifestyle store offers womenswear, menswear, kidswear, footwear, bags, beauty, skincare & accessories such as watches, fragrances, sunglasses.

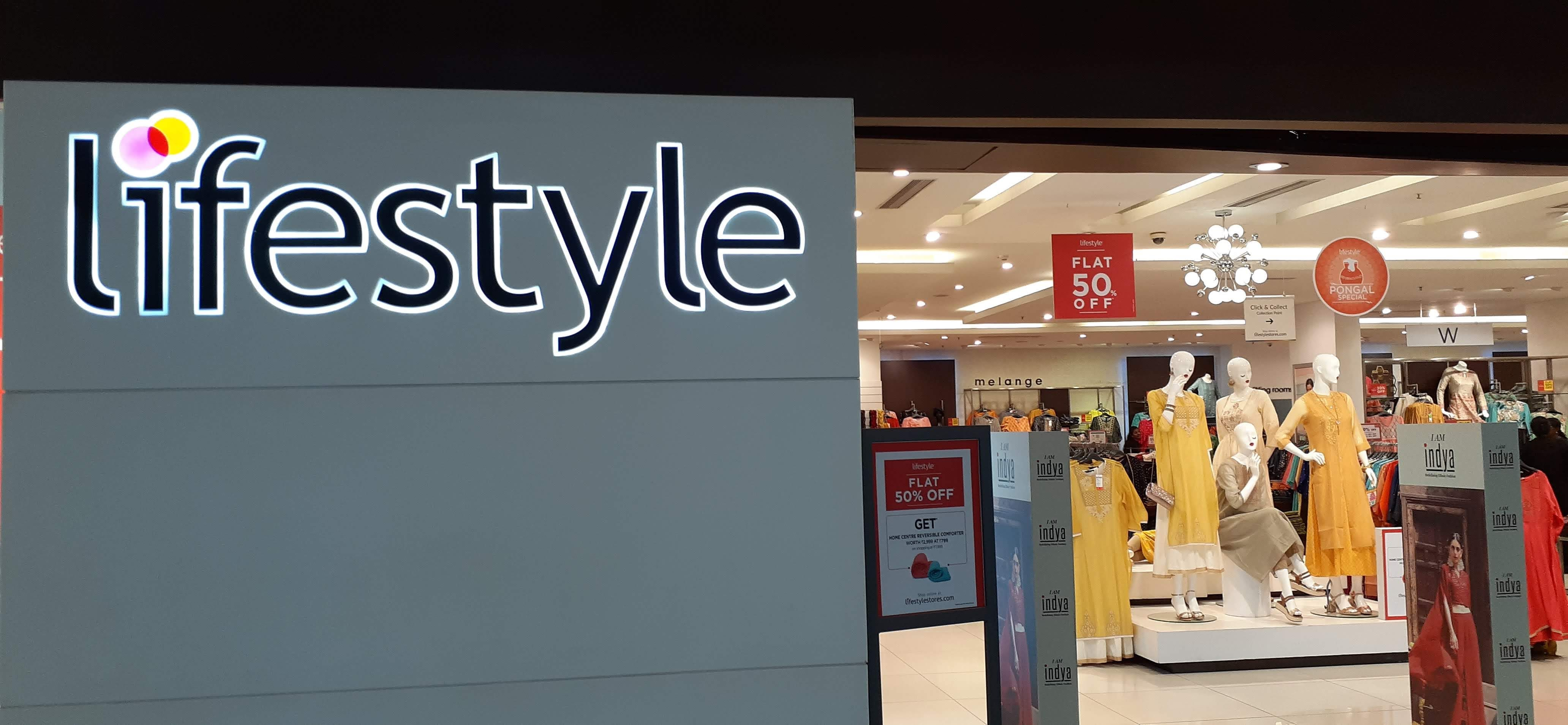
Lifestyle Stores in Chennai, Tamil Nadu, India

The company sells national and international brands, which make up 75% of their stock, along with its in-house brand labels that bring in about 30% of the revenues and account for the remaining 25% of in-store stock. Lifestyle's private labels include brands like Melange, which is a ₹150 crore brand with eight stores in India.

Lifestyle International generates the majority of its revenue through its brick-and-mortar stores, which consist of 63 Lifestyle stores. The retail chain has a presence in Tier 1 cities, and has expanded to Tier 2 and Tier 3 cities such as Nagpur, Jaipur, Visakhapatnam and Nashik. Each store is estimated to cost the company around Rs. 10 crore to set up, on an average.

== Employee welfare initiatives ==
In wake of a high employee attrition rate in 2015, the company decided to offer flexible working hours and to provide medical facilities to its front-end staff, among other benefits. With that, the company has managed to reduce the attrition rate to 35% in 2017, from 80% in 2005, while the industry average is still 50%.

Employee welfare initiates called 'LIFE 'and 'LEAP' were run by the company. LIFE standing for Learn – Implement – Fastrack – Expert and LEAP for Landmark Education are two in-house programs that provide technical and soft skills to the front-end employees and enables them to get a degree in retail management, respectively.

The company also held employee appreciation programs such as the Clash of Icons, Make a difference; Incentives and Long Service awards are given periodically to deserving employees. Corporate Theatre was another informal learning technique used by Lifestyle to educate, entertain and engage its employees.

== Corporate social responsibility ==
Spreading awareness about diabetes, Landmark Group has held multiple editions of the 'Beat Diabetes’ campaign that involves setting up free glucose screening test counters at Lifestyle and other stores under the brand. The sixth edition of the campaign was held in November 2015 and had athlete Anju Bobby George and film actresses Amulya and Samyukta Hornad join in.

== Home Centre Stores ==
Home Centre is a part of the Lifestyle chain of stores in India. Having centres in UAE, Bahrain, Saudi Arabia, Qatar, Oman, Egypt, Kuwait, and India, Home Centre spans over a retail area of over 2.4 million square feet (220×10^{3} m^{2}).

Home Centre by Lifestyle sells furniture, furnishings and home decorative. The brand has been awarded as the Most Admired Retailer award in the Home & Office Improvement Category, for two consecutive years – 2008 and 2009.

== See also ==
- List of department stores by country
