= Landmark Group =

UAE-based retail company

Landmark Group Holding LLC
- Type: Private
- Industry: Healthcare; Hospitality; Retail
- Founded: 1973; 53 years ago
- Founder: Micky Jagtiani
- Headquarters: Dubai, United Arab Emirates
- Number of locations: 2,400
- Area served: Worldwide
- Key people: Renuka Jagtiani (Chairwoman); Rajesh Garg (CFO)
- Revenue: US$7 billion (2016)
- Number of employees: 55,000+ (May 2023)
- Subsidiaries: Lifestyle
- Website: www.landmarkgroup.com

Landmark Group is a UAE-based retail and hospitality holding company headquartered in Dubai. It was founded by Indian businessman Micky Jagtiani i

1973. The group's focus is the retail of apparel, footwear, consumer electronics, cosmetics & beauty products, home improvement, and baby products. It expanded into hospitality, leisure, healthcare, and mall management.

== Operations ==
Landmark Group's business interests can be broadly classified into retail, hospitality, and healthcare.

The Landmark Group is a retail and hospitality conglomerate in the Middle East, Africa, and the Indian subcontinent. Based out of Dubai, the company was established in 1973, with its first store in Bahrain. The group's current employee base stands at 55,000 employees operating over 2,400 outlets, with a retail presence of over 30 million sq. ft. across 21 countries.

== Brands ==
=== Retail ===
==== Fashion ====
- Babyshop
- Centrepoint
- Easy Buy
- Iconic
- Lifestyle
- Max Fashion
- Shoe Mart
- Shoexpress
- Styli
- Splash

==== Electronics and Home ====
- Emax
- Home Centre
- Home Box

=== Hospitality ===
The group also holds franchise rights for many global fashion and footwear brands in the countries where it operates. The group also has a presence in leisure, food, hospitality, and healthcare with Landmark Leisure, Foodmark, Balance Spa and Salon, Citymax Hotels and Fitness First.

==== Restaurants ====
- Carluccio's
- Chi’ Zen
- Max’s
- Max Hamburgers
- The Meat Company
- Tribes
- Nando’s
- Ushna
- Zafran

Source: Zawya

=== Viva Supermarket ===
Viva is a discount supermarket chain in the United Arab Emirates that launched on February 28, 2018, with the promise of saving an average family a month's salary on its annual shopping bills. Within 18 months of launch Viva had opened 16 outlets, and by October 2021, had expanded to 53 stores. As of April 2023, Viva operates in all the Emirates of the United Arab Emirates. There are 77 supermarkets in total.
