= Micky Jagtiani =

Indian businessman (1952–2023)

- Born: Mukesh Wadhumal Jagtiani; 15 August 1952; Kuwait City, Kuwait
- Died: 26 May 2023 (aged 70); United Arab Emirates
- Occupations: Chairman and owner of Landmark Group
- Known for: Landmark retail stores
- Spouse: Renuka Jagtiani
- Children: 3

Mukesh Wadhumal "Micky" Jagtiani (15 August 1952 – 26 May 2023) was an Indian billionaire businessman based in the United Arab Emirates, and was the chairman and owner of the Dubai-based Landmark Group.

== Early life and education ==
Jagtiani was of Sindhi heritage. He attended school in Chennai, Mumbai, and Beirut, before moving to London, where he joined an accounting school from which he eventually dropped out.

== Career ==
Jagtiani returned to Bahrain and took over his deceased brother's shop that he turned into a baby products shop (Babyshop). After 10 years working in the shop, Jagtiani started to expand by opening six new shops. When the Gulf War struck, he moved to Dubai where he founded the Landmark Group. Over the years, the Landmark Group expanded into fashion, electronics, furniture and budget hotels in Middle East and Southeast Asia. It employs around 45,000 people and has more than 1000 stores across the Persian Gulf region, Middle East and India.

In 2008, Jagtiani bought a 6% stake in the UK high-street retailer Debenhams, entered the Forbes list of billionaires, and became the 16th richest Indian with a net worth of USD 2 billion. In 2014, he launched a family office with assets worth US$5 billion. In May 2023, his estimated net worth was US$5.2 billion, according to Forbes.

As per Forbes list of India’s 100 richest tycoons, dated OCTOBER 09, 2024, Renuka Jagtiani is ranked 56th with a net worth of $5.6 Billion.

== Personal life and death ==
Jagtiani was married to Renuka Jagtiani and had three children: Aarti, Nisha, and Rahul. He lived in Dubai, United Arab Emirates. He died on 26 May 2023, at the age of 70.
