= Blackberrys =

Indian clothing brand

- Industry: Retail
- Founded: 1991; 35 years ago in Chandni Chowk, India
- Founders: Nitin Mohan and Nikhil Mohan
- Number of locations: 352 cities
- Area served: India
- Products: Clothing
- Website: blackberrys.com

Blackberrys is an Indian luxury clothing brand owned by Mohan Clothing Co. Pvt Ltd. It was established in 1991 and caters to men.

== Operations ==
As of August 2018, the Blackberrys brand has 55 franchise stores, 350 company-owned showrooms and is present in over 900 multi-brand outlets.
