= Max Fashion =

Emirati fashion brand, subsidiary of Landmark Group

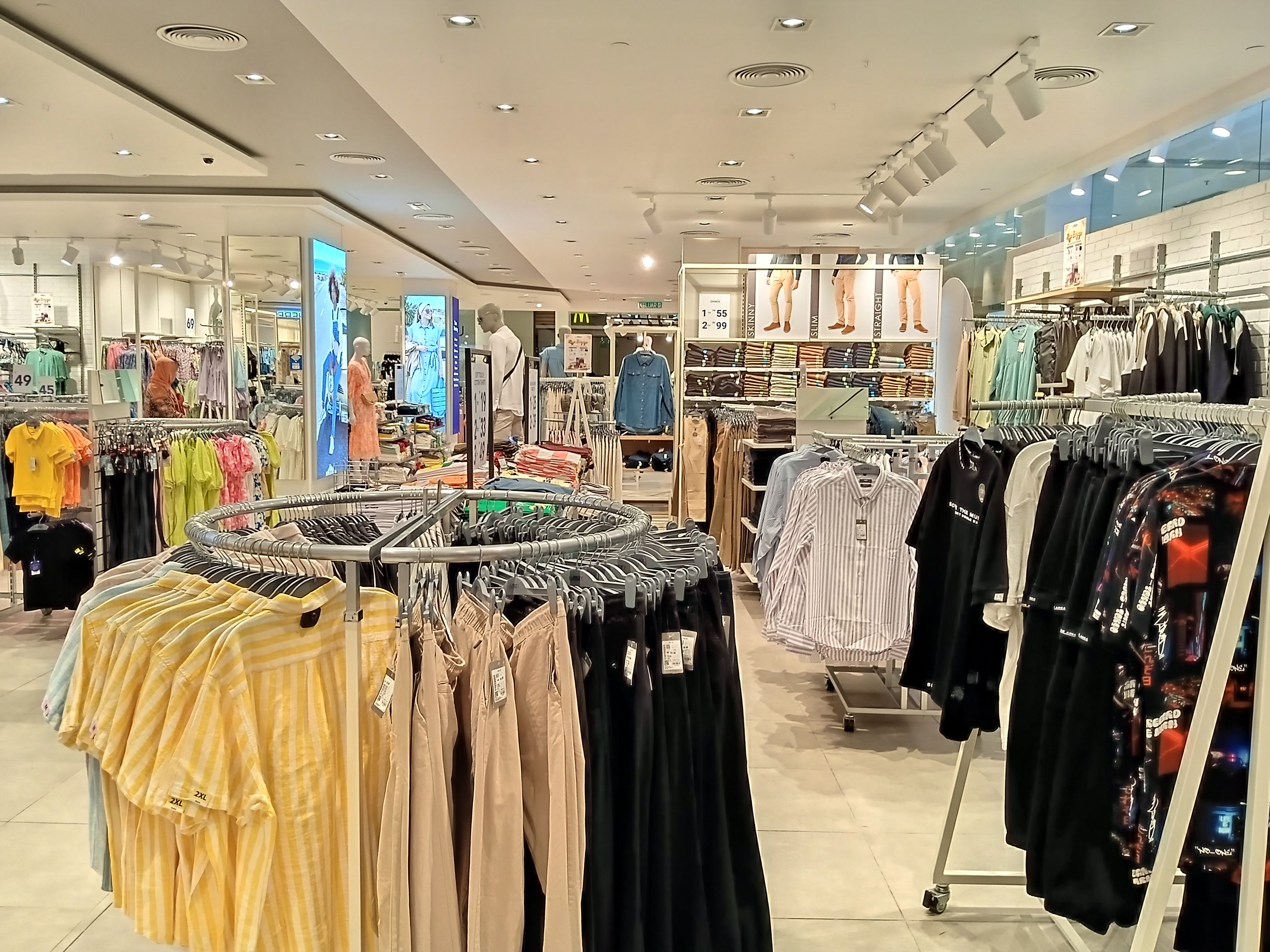
- Max Fashion branch in Malaysia
- Type: Subsidiary
- Industry: Retail
- Founded: May 2004; 22 years ago
- Headquarters: Dubai, United Arab Emirates India., United Arab Emirates
- Area served: Worldwide
- Key people: Sumit Chandna CEO Max & Director Landmark Group, Vasanth Kumar, Executive Director, Shital Mehta, CEO (India)
- Number of employees: 6,000
- Parent: Landmark Group
- Website: Official Website

Max Fashion (Max) is a fashion brand under the banner of the UAE-based Landmark Group. The brand was launched in May 2004.

== History ==
Max Fashion was established in 2004 in the Middle East, in Abu Dhabi. The year 2006 saw the Indian launch of the brand, with its first store in Indore.

Max is present in the Middle East, North Africa, South East Asia and India, with over 500 stores encompassing 8.5 million sq ft across 20 countries, including United Arab Emirates, India, Saudi Arabia, Kuwait, Jordan, Bahrain, Qatar, Oman, Kenya, Lebanon, Egypt, Algeria, Tunisia, Nigeria, Libya, Tanzania, Indonesia, Malaysia, Iraq and Syria.

In India, Max is a division of Lifestyle India Pvt. Ltd., Which opened its first store in Indore in 2006. Max has more than 200 stores in India across 80 cities. Max is a mono brand with its own label merchandise, created by in-house designers.

== Brand marketing ==
Max Fashion often launches billboard collections in Dubai. In December 2018, Microsoft and Ombori partnered with Max to install interactive, bilingual and voice activated mirrors in Dubai's Ibn Battuta Mall.
