= World One =

Residential skyscraper in Mumbai, India

Lodha World One
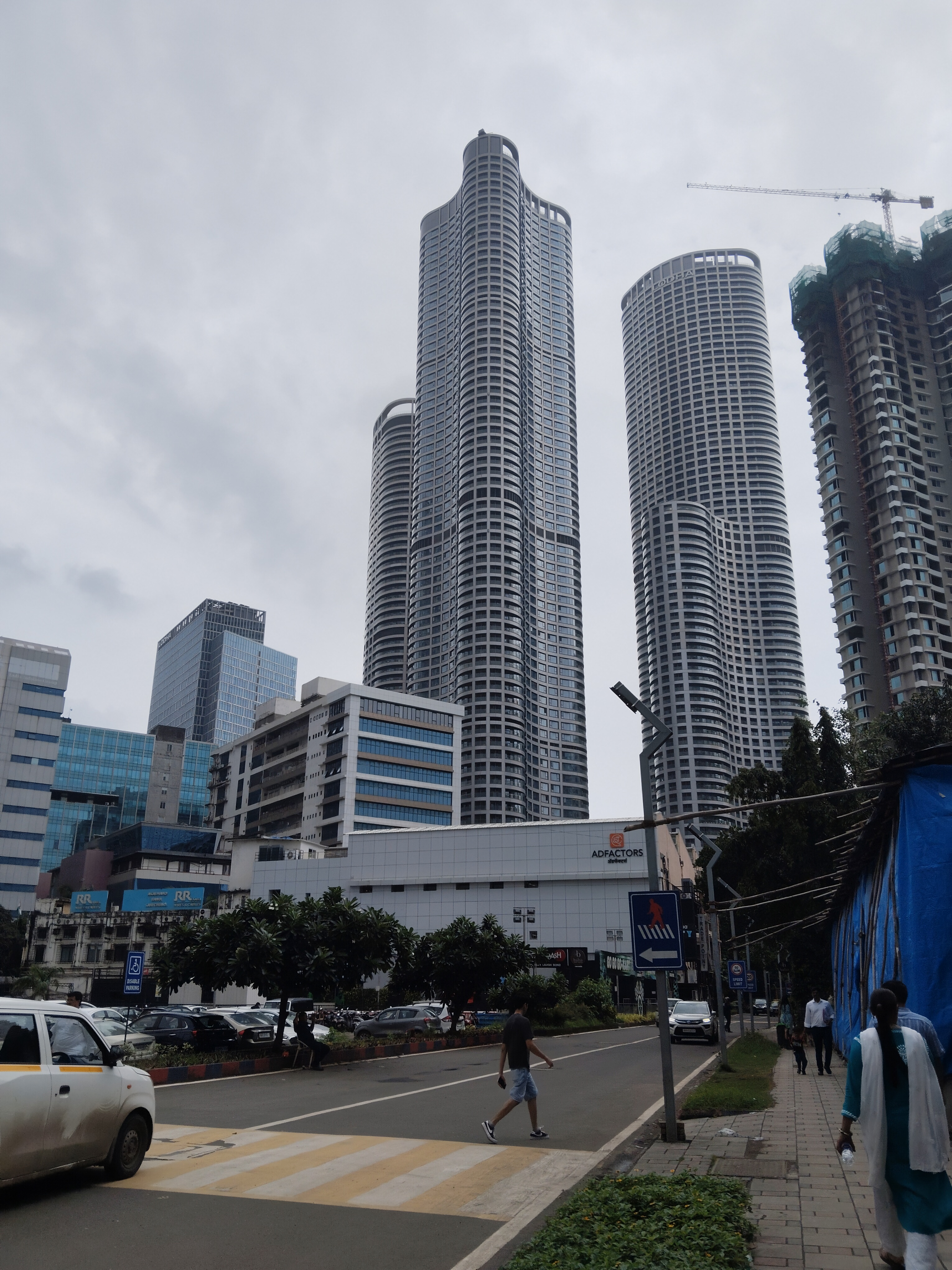
- World One, World View and World Crest

Record height
- Tallest in India from 2020 to 2023^{[I]}
- Preceded by: Lodha The Park
- Surpassed by: Lokhandwala Minerva

General information
- Status: Completed
- Type: Residential Skyscrapers
- Location: Shankar Rao Naram Path, Lower Parel, Mumbai, India
- Coordinates: 19.0023°N 72.8265°E
- Groundbreaking: 23 July 2010
- Construction started: 7 May 2011
- Completed: 2020
- Opened: 2020
- Cost: US$321 million
- Owner: Lodha Group

Height
- Architectural: 280.2 m (919 ft)

Technical details
- Material: Steel / Reinforced Concrete
- Floor count: 76 above ground 2 below ground
- Lifts/elevators: 18
- Grounds: 7.1 ha (17.5 acres)

Design and construction
- Architect: Pei Cobb Freed & Partners
- Developer: Lodha Developers
- Structural engineer: Leslie E. Robertson Associates
- Main contractor: Arabian Construction Co. & Simplex and Muscovite Group

Website
- www.lodhagroup.com/projects/residential-property-in-worli/lodha-world-one

World One is a 280.2 m (919 ft), 76-floor skyscraper in Mumbai, Maharashtra, India. As of 2024, it is the second tallest completed building in India and the fourth tallest overall. It is on the 7.1-hectare (17.5-acre) site of the defunct Shrinivas Mill. The site also houses two other towers: World View and World Crest. The complex was developed by the Lodha Group.

World One was built at an estimated cost of over US $321 million. Construction began in 2011, and was initially said to be 442 m (1,450 ft) tall. However, the developer failed to obtain approval from the Airports Authority of India for that height; the project was then stalled for a few years. Following the delay, the project was redesigned to the current height and completed.

World One's architect is Pei Cobb Freed & Partners, the structural engineer is Leslie E. Robertson Associates & MEP engineer is BuroHappold Engineering. The whole project consists of three towers. There were two construction civil contractors involved: Arabian Construction Co. and Simplex (World One), Muscovite Group (World Crest, World View).

== History ==
The Lodha Group purchased the 7.1-hectare (17.5-acre) site of the defunct Shrinivas Mill in Lower Parel, Mumbai from Shrinivas Cotton in 2005. In June 2010, The Economic Times reported that the Lodha Group had secured over ₹10 billion (US$100 million) from Singapore funds GIC and Temasek, and a property fund of mortgage giant HDFC, and intended to develop property on the Shrinivas Mill site. In 2010, the developer announced the construction of the World One tower at the site of the defunct mill. The Lodha Group would also construct the World View tower and the World Crest tower, on the same site, as part of the project. World One initially faced opposition from the Directorate General of Civil Aviation (DGCA) over security concerns related to the height of the building. World One was built at an estimated cost of over US$321 million. The interior of the tower was designed by Giorgio Armani, and includes a swimming pool, gym and health club, cricket pitches and a pavilion. The 117-storey tower would have contained 290 apartments, some overlooking the Arabian Sea.

The contract to construct World One was awarded to a joint venture of the UAE-based Arabian Construction Company and Simplex Infrastructure. Construction on World One began in 2011. By December 2014, about 75% of civil construction on the project had been completed. By June 2015, 70% of the tower was complete, with 83 floors having been built.

Apartments at World One start at ₹150 million (US$1.6 million) for a three-bedroom unit. The Lodha Group opened bookings for apartments at World One on 29 November 2011. When the first round of bookings closed on 14 December 2014, Lodha had received ₹5 billion (US$52 million) worth of bookings, at an approximate rate of over ₹70,000 (US$730)–₹80,000 (US$830) per sq ft. The tower is composed of 3 and 4 BHK (Note: In real estate, BHK refers to the number of "bedroom, hall, and kitchen" (s) in a housing unit. 1 BHK means that the unit has 1 bedroom, 1 hall, 1 kitchen, while 2 BHK means that it has 2 bedrooms, 1 hall, and 1 kitchen. This term is commonly used in India.) apartments. Lodha began offering apartments at World One for sale in London in February 2015. The company hired London estate agent, Wetherell Estates, to market and sell homes in the tower. Lodha particularly hoped to target high net worth Indians living in Mayfair, London.

HDFC Property Fund invested ₹500 crore to acquire a 10% stake in Lodha World Towers project in 2010. The firm exited the project in October 2016, earning a return of triple their investment. In September 2016, Piramal Fund Management Pvt. Ltd invested ₹2,320 crore in Lodha World Towers project.

The developer failed to obtain approval from Airports Authority of India for 501.33 m (1,645 ft) height in 2010 and 442 m (1,450 ft) height in 2015, so the project was redesigned for a height of 280.2 m (919 ft) and 76 floors and subsequently constructed for that height.

== World View and World Crest ==
There are two other towers under this project:

- World View: a 73 floor skyscraper with a height of 277.6 m (911 ft). Construction of the tower began in 2015, and was completed in 2020. As of 2024, the tower is the 5th tallest building in India.
- World Crest: a 57 floor skyscraper with a height of 222.5 m (730 ft). Construction of the tower began in 2011, and was completed in 2017.

== See also ==
- List of tallest buildings in India
- List of tallest buildings in Mumbai
- List of tallest structures in India
- List of tallest buildings and structures in the Indian subcontinent
- List of tallest buildings in different cities in India
- List of tallest structures in the world
- List of tallest buildings in Asia
- List of tallest residential buildings
- List of buildings with 100 floors or more
