= One Avighna Park =

Residential tower building in Mumbai, India

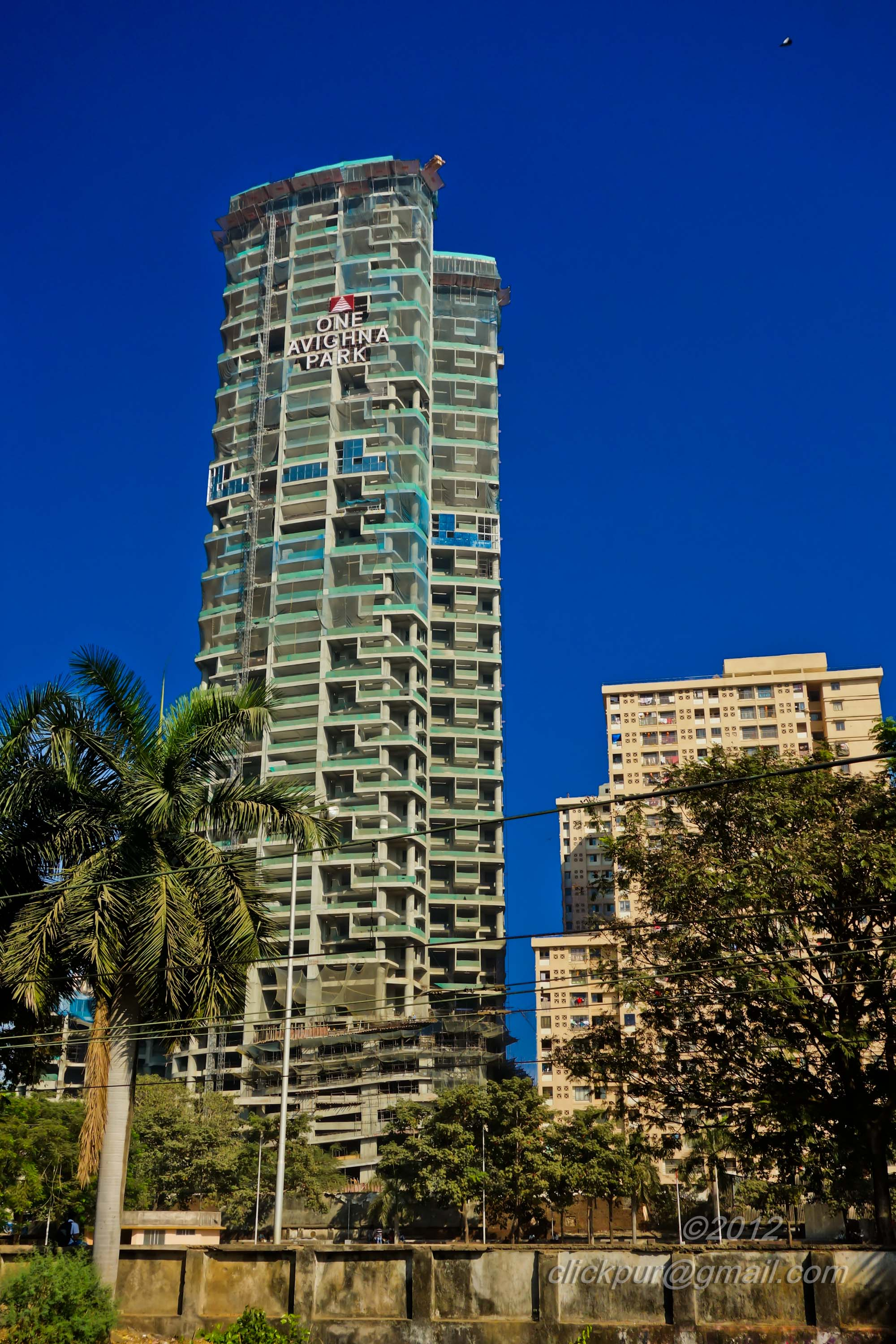
- Interactive map of the One Avighna Park area

General information
- Status: Completed
- Type: Luxury Residential Skyscrapers
- Location: Currey Road, Mumbai, Maharashtra, India
- Coordinates: 18.9943794°N 72.8348517°E
- Construction started: 2010
- Completed: 2017

Height
- Roof: 260 metres (853 ft)

Technical details
- Material: Reinforced Concrete
- Floor count: 64

Design and construction
- Developer: Avighna India Ltd.
- Awards: 7 International Property Awards, Including - "World's Best Residential High-rise Development", "Best Landscape Architecture-India", "Best High-rise Architecture-India" & "Best Apartment Interior- India".

One Avighna Park is a twin 64-storey luxury residential skyscraper, located in Lower Parel, Mumbai, Maharashtra, India. It is the 16th tallest building in India.

== Notable events ==
On 22 October 2021, a fire broke out on the 19th floor on the building. One security guard died after jumping from the burning floor.

On 15 December 2022, a fire broke out on the 22nd floor, injuring two firefighters and a resident.

== See also ==
- List of tallest buildings in India
- List of tallest buildings in Mumbai
- List of tallest structures in India
- List of tallest buildings in different cities in India
- List of tallest structures in the world
- List of tallest buildings in Asia
- List of tallest buildings and structures in the Indian subcontinent
- List of tallest buildings in Navi Mumbai
