= Nathani Heights =

Residential skyscraper in Mumbai, Maharashtra, India

- Interactive map of the Nathani Heights area

General information
- Status: Completed
- Type: Residential Skyscraper
- Location: Mumbai, India
- Coordinates: 18°58′6.535″N 72°49′12.149″E
- Construction started: 2011
- Topped-out: 2020
- Completed: 2020

Height
- Tip: 262 metres (860 ft)

Technical details
- Material: Concrete
- Floor count: 72

Design and construction
- Architecture firm: Thoronton Tomasetti
- Developer: Multiplex

Website
- http://www.nathanigroup.in/#

Nathani Heights is a residential skyscraper located in Mumbai, Maharashtra, India. The skyscraper is located near the Mumbai Central railway station, which is one of the busiest in Mumbai. The 262-meter tall skyscraper was first proposed in 2011. Construction started in 2012 and the project was completed in 2020. It is the 13th tallest building in India.

== Amenities ==
Nathani Heights is built in central Mumbai, and many views are offered from the skyscraper as well. The Mahalaxmi Racecourse, and Arabian Sea can be viewed from the skyscraper. The skyscraper features many amenities as well like a fully equipped gym, massage rooms, and yoga space. Swimming pools, tennis courts, and jogging tracks are also available in the skyscraper.

== See also ==
- List of tallest buildings in India
- List of tallest buildings in Mumbai
- List of tallest buildings in different cities in India
- List of tallest buildings and structures in the Indian subcontinent
- List of tallest buildings in Navi Mumbai
- List of tallest buildings in Asia
- List of tallest structures in India
- List of tallest structures in the world
- List of buildings with 100 floors or more
