= The Park (residential project) =

Lodha Park
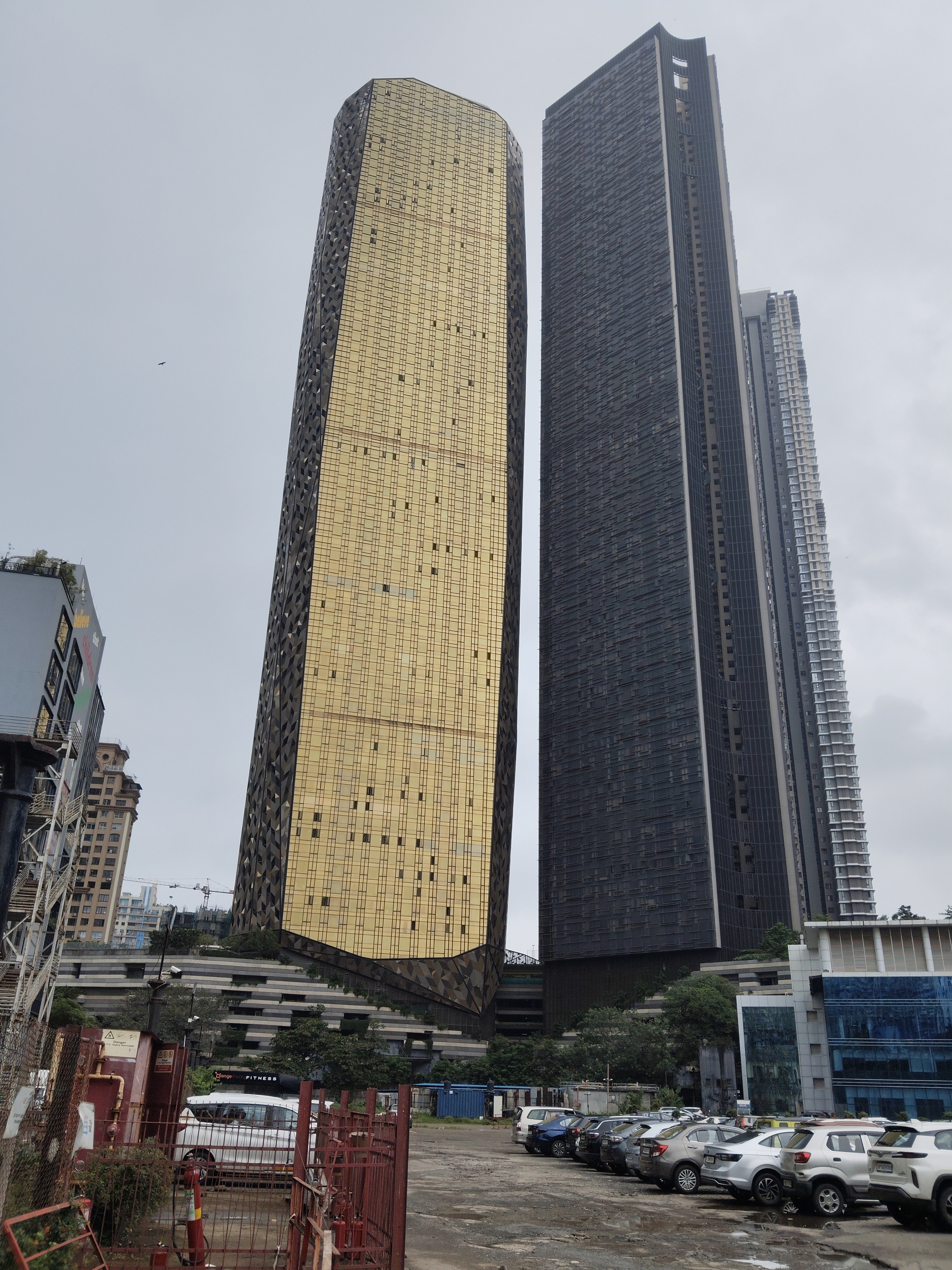
- Lodha Trump Tower and Lodha Marquise Mumbai

- Location within Mumbai

General information
- Status: Completed
- Type: Luxury Residential Skyscrapers
- Location: Worli, Mumbai, Lodha Park, Pandurang Budhkar Marg, Worli, Mumbai, Mumbai
- Coordinates: 19.0067°N 72.8272°E
- Construction started: 2013
- Completed: 2021

Height
- Height: 268 m

Technical details
- Material: Glass / Reinforced Concrete
- Floor count: 76

Design and construction
- Architect: WOHA
- Developer: Lodha Group

Other information
- Parking: 4389

Website
- www.lodhagroup.com/projects/residential-property-in-worli/lodha-park

Lodha Park is an 18.5-acre (7.5 ha) luxury residential skyscraper project which was developed by the Lodha Group in the upscale Lower Parel neighborhood of Mumbai, Maharastra, India. The land for the project was purchased from DLF Limited in 2012 for approximately ₹2,800 crore (₹28,000,000,000). Lodha Park consists of 5 towers, each standing 268 meters tall and with 76 floors. Lodha Park Towers were the tallest buildings in India from 2019 to 2020, until surpassed by World One in 2020, which in turn was surpassed by Lokhandwala Minerva in 2023. The towers are currently the 6th tallest buildings in India.

== Developer ==
Lodha is a real estate development company primarily doing business in residential and commercial construction projects in Mumbai, Pune, Hyderabad and the United Kingdom. They are the developers of World One, a residential skyscraper in Mumbai and the second tallest completed building in India.

== Location ==
Lodha Park is located along Pandurang Budhkar Marg in Worli. Bandra Kurla Complex along with Nariman Point and the Mumbai business districts are in close proximity. The High Street Phoenix shopping mall and PVR Cinemas are within driving distance.

== Project launch ==
In September, the real estate company announced that Aishwarya Rai Bachchan would be the brand ambassador for this project. It has also been reported that the actress has bought a 4-BHK residence in the project worth more than ₹5 crores (₹50,000,000). After a billion-dollar pre-launch, Lodha Group launched the Lodha Park project in September and secured bookings worth ₹2,500 crores (₹25,000,000,000) on day one. The launch was spread across Mumbai, Dubai, New Delhi, Kolkata, Pune, Ahmedabad and Surat. Bookings were also received from overseas Indians in the United Arab Emirates and United States.

== Features ==
Lodha Park includes premium residential and commercial developments, hotel rooms, retail stores, a clubhouse, and a restaurant. The project includes 7 acres of green landscapes set on top of a 70-foot ‘hill’ inspired by other urban parks around the world. The project is anticipated to generate more than 5,000 direct jobs including 1,000 white collar jobs including architects, engineers, and interior designers. It will also support more than 10,000 indirect jobs in related industries such as cement, steel, tiles, and cables. Upon completion, over 500 full-time jobs in facility management, housekeeping, horticulture, and retail are expected. The project would also integrate the Evander Holyfield gym within the complex. Lodha Trump Tower Mumbai, is a 268 metres (879 ft) tower with three and four bedroom apartments constructed by the Lodha Group in collaboration with Donald Trump's Trump Organization in August 2014 is part of the project.

== See also ==
- List of tallest buildings in India
- List of tallest buildings in Mumbai
- List of tallest structures in India
- List of tallest buildings and structures in the Indian subcontinent
- List of tallest buildings in different cities in India
- List of tallest buildings in Asia
- List of tallest residential buildings
- Trump Towers Pune
