= Omkar 1973 =

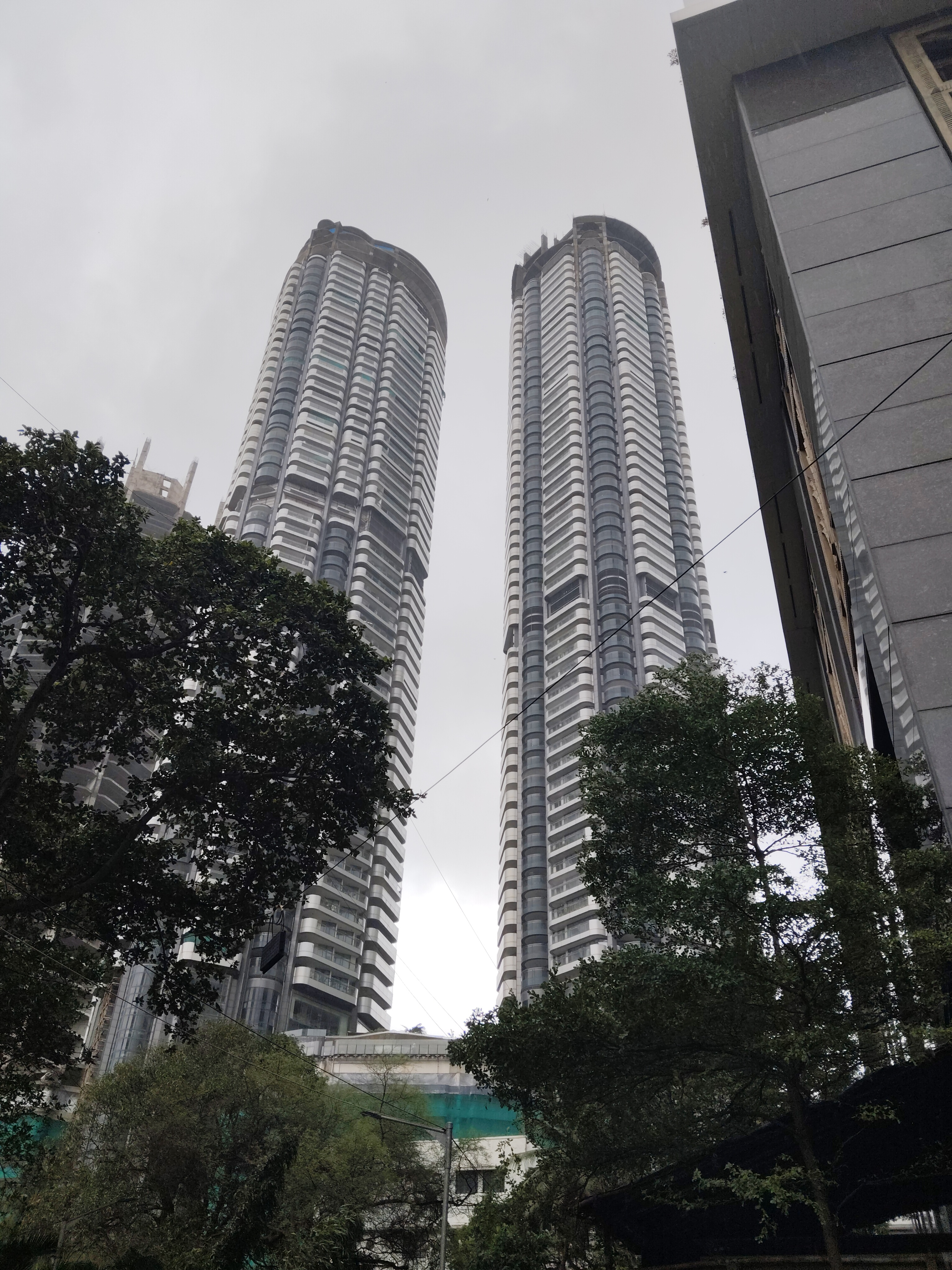

- Location within Mumbai

General information
- Status: Topped out
- Type: Residential Skyscrapers
- Location: Mumbai, India, Omkar 1973, Near Neelam Center Off Annie Besant Road, Worli, Mumbai, Maharashtra 400030, India
- Coordinates: 19.0167°N 72.8167°E
- Completed: 2024
- Cost: 10000 CR
- Owner: Omkar Realtors & Developers

Technical details
- Material: Glass / Reinforced Concrete
- Floor count: 73

Design and construction
- Architect: Foster and Partners
- Developer: Omkar Realtors & Developers
- Structural engineer: Buro Happold Engineers India Pvt Ltd
- Main contractor: Larsen & Toubro

Website
- http://www.omkar1973.com/

Omkar 1973 Worli is a residential multi-skyscraper project located in Worli, Mumbai, Maharashtra, India. It is a 3-tower development project by Omkar Realtors. The project was expected to be completed by late 2024. It is currently the 11th tallest building in India.

== Composition ==
The Omkar 1973 towers project consists of 400-plus "sky bungalows", ranging from 2,500 sq. ft. to 18,200 sq. ft. area. It will have a height of around 267 metres (876 ft) and an area of about 5,000,000 sq. ft. The project consists of 3 equally tall skyscrapers which are Omkar 1973 towers A, B, and C, all 73 stories tall. All towers have 3 underground floors for parking.

== Associations & Design ==
The towers are originally designed by Fosters+Partners, then taken over by UHA London as an executive architects and the interior is designed by Hirsch Bedner Associates (HBA), UK. https://www.uha.global/projects/omkar-1973

== Current status ==
Currently, Sales of Freehold apartments are on hold as directed by Bombay High Court due to non-payment of rent to the residents of Worli.

== See also ==
- List of tallest buildings in India
- List of tallest buildings in Mumbai
- List of tallest structures in India
- List of tallest buildings and structures in the Indian subcontinent
- List of tallest structures in the world
- List of tallest buildings in Asia
- List of tallest buildings in different cities in India
- List of tallest residential buildings
