= Three Sixty West =

Building complex in India

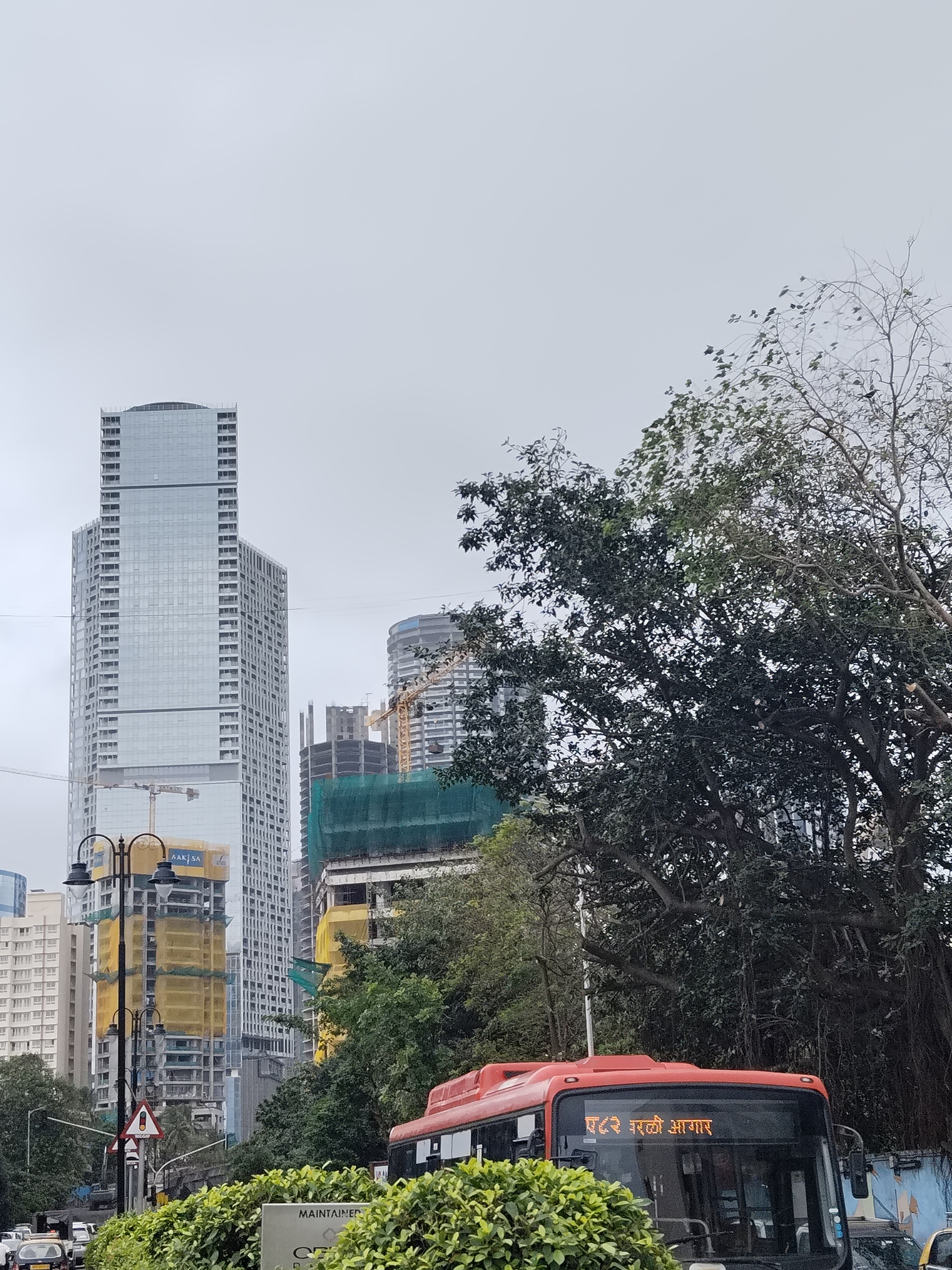
- Three Sixty West Tower B

General information
- Status: Completed
- Type: Mixed-use: Commercial / Residential
- Location: Worli, Mumbai
- Coordinates: 19.0111°N 72.8234°E
- Construction started: June 18, 2011
- Completed: 29 May 2023

Height
- Roof: Tower B: 260 metres (853 ft); Tower A: 255.6 metres (839 ft)

Technical details
- Material: Glass / Reinforced Concrete
- Floor count: Tower B: 66; Tower A: 52

Design and construction
- Architect: Kohn Pedersen Fox
- Developer: Oberoi Realty
- Structural engineer: Leslie E. Robertson Associates
- Main contractor: Samsung C&T Corporation

Website
- threesixtywest.com

Three Sixty West is a skyscraper complex in Mumbai, Maharashtra, India. It comprises two towers, joined at ground level by a podium. Tower B, the taller of the two, rises to 260 metres (853 ft) with 66 floors and Tower A rises to 255.6 metres (839 ft) with 52 floors. Tower B is a hotel / office space, and private residences are located in Tower A. The podium accommodates amenities such as restaurants and ballrooms. Tower B is the 14th tallest building in India and Tower A the 21st tallest. Tower B is among the tallest commercial skyscrapers in the country.

The project was designed by Kohn Pedersen Fox. The structural consultant is Leslie E. Robertson Associates and the main contractor is Samsung C&T. Hotel interiors are done by Tony Chi and Associates. Residents' amenities are designed by Populous.

The project was developed under Oasis Realty, a joint venture between Sahana and Oberoi Realty. In May 2014, Oberoi Realty announced The Ritz-Carlton as the hospitality partner for the project. The Ritz-Carlton Mumbai occupies Tower A, and the private residences in Tower B have access to certain services from the hotel.

The project was formally named Three Sixty West in 2015.

Upon its topping-out in March 2019, Tower B's spire was ceremonially capped with a 1.2-meter bronze finial cast in the shape of a stylized Ashoka Chakra—a gesture of national pride commissioned by Oberoi Realty and blessed in a private puja attended by Maharashtra Chief Minister Devendra Fadnavis.

== See also ==
- List of tallest buildings in India
- List of tallest buildings in Mumbai
- List of tallest structures in India
- List of tallest buildings in different cities in India
- List of tallest buildings and structures in the Indian subcontinent
- List of tallest buildings in Asia
- List of tallest residential buildings
- List of tallest structures in the world
