= List of tallest buildings in India =

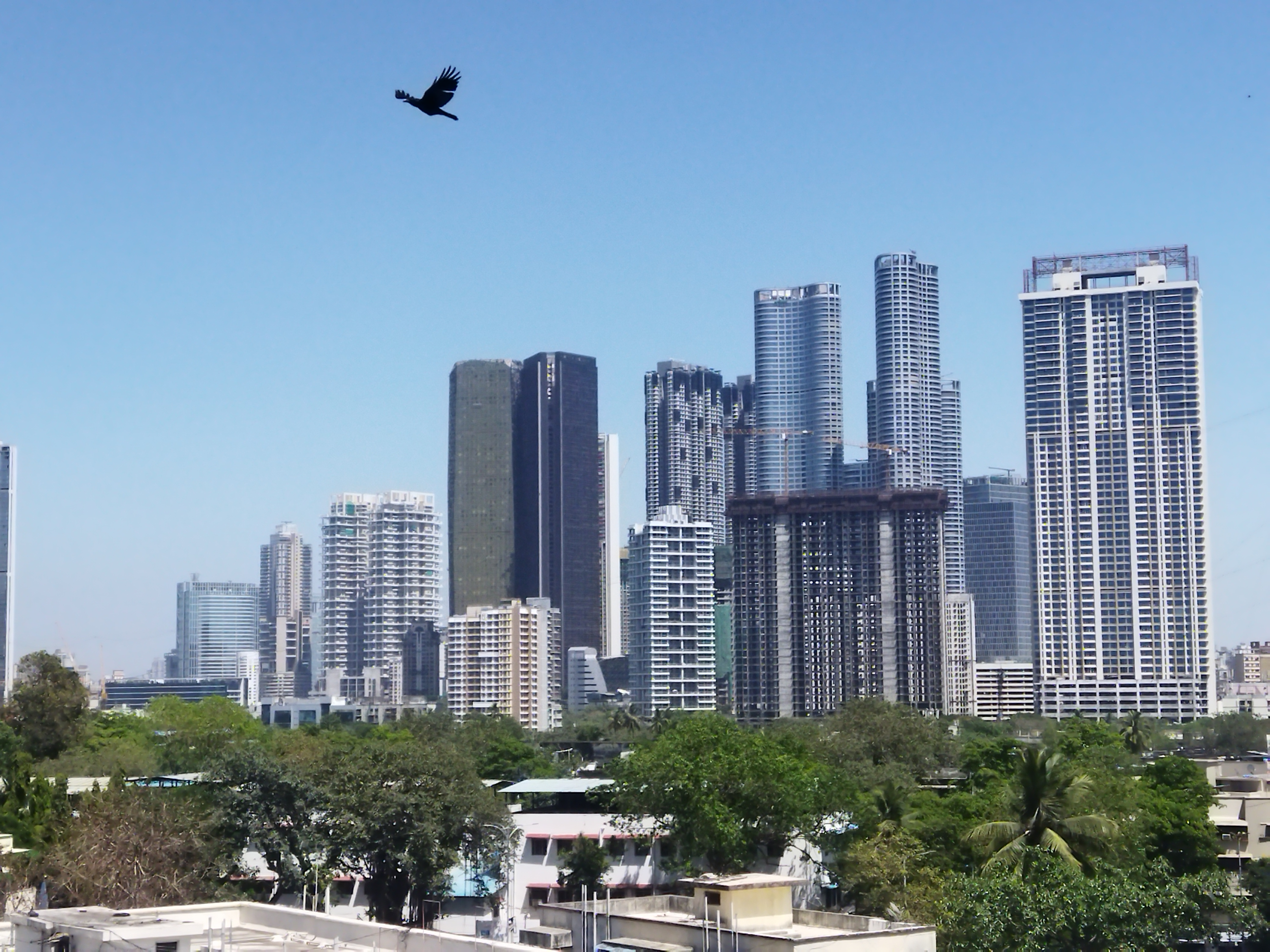
Mumbai's Lower Parel Skyline.

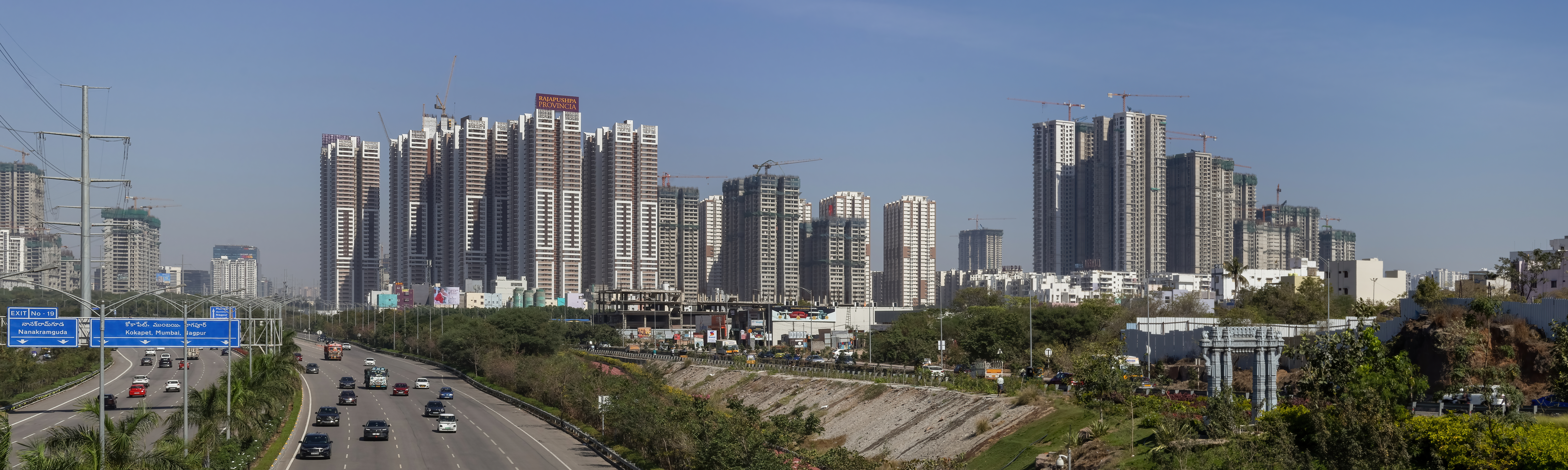
The skyline of Hyderabad’s Kokapet as viewed from the Outer Ring Road.

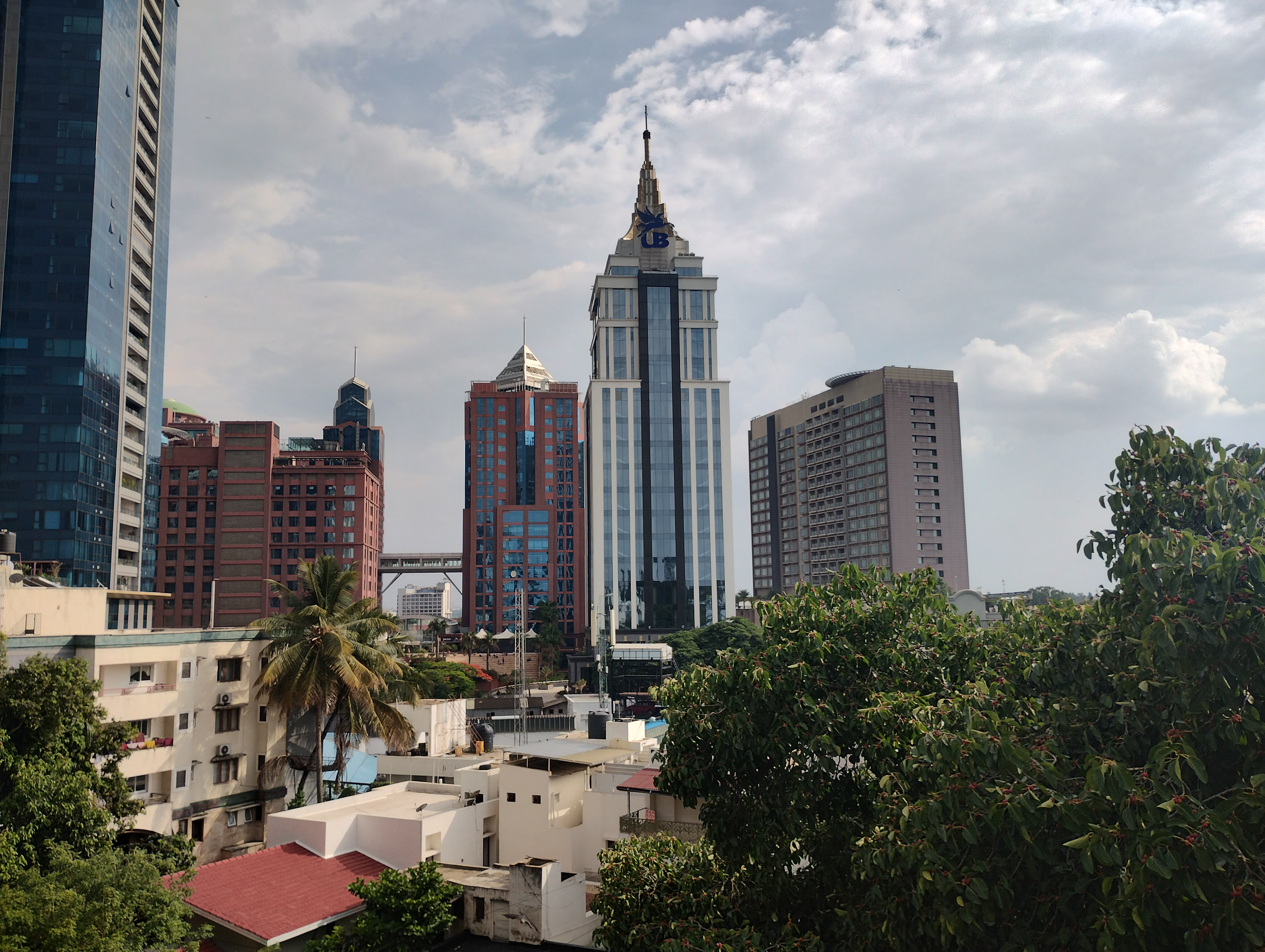
Bengaluru's Skyline.

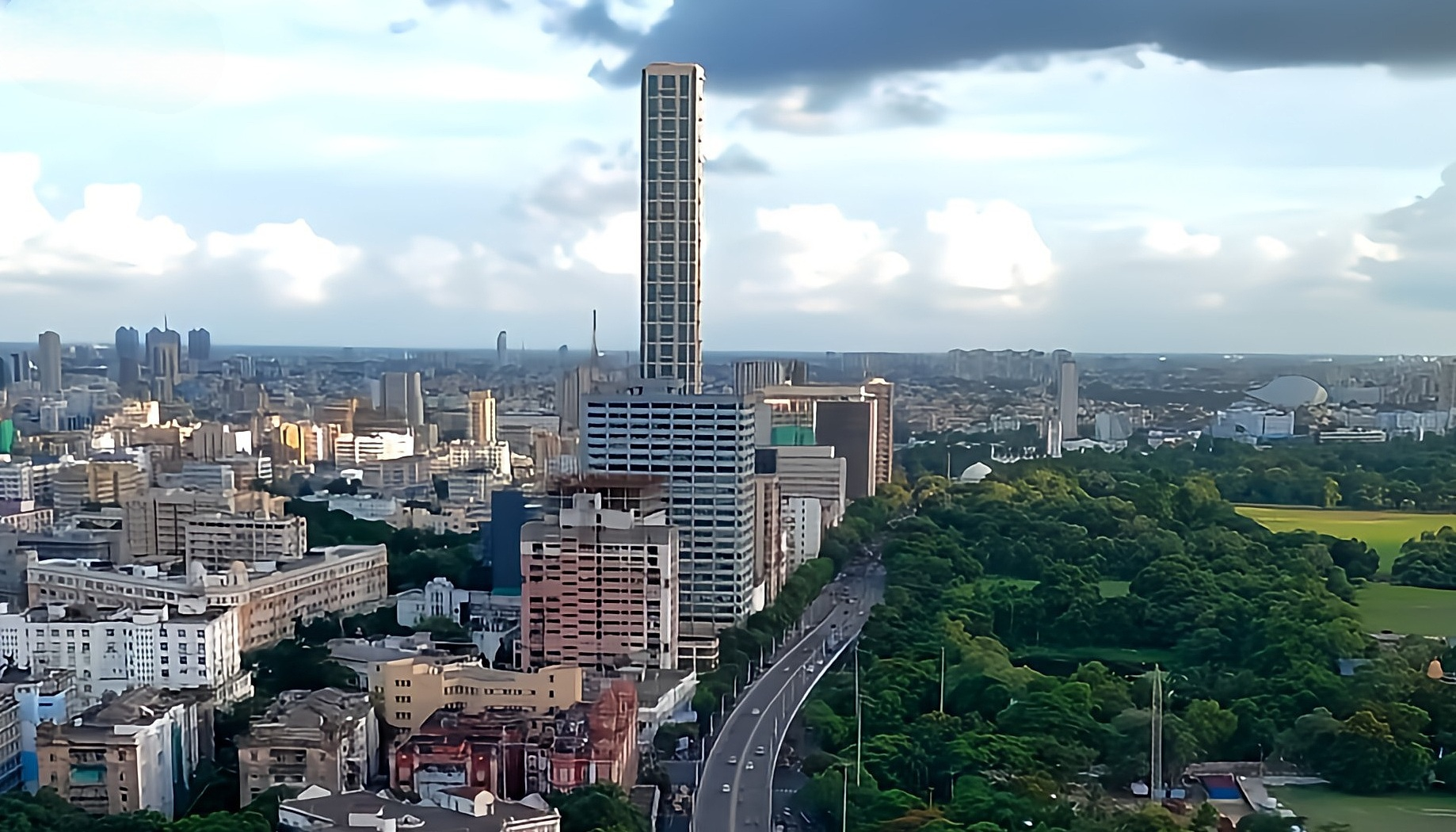
Kolkata's Skyline.

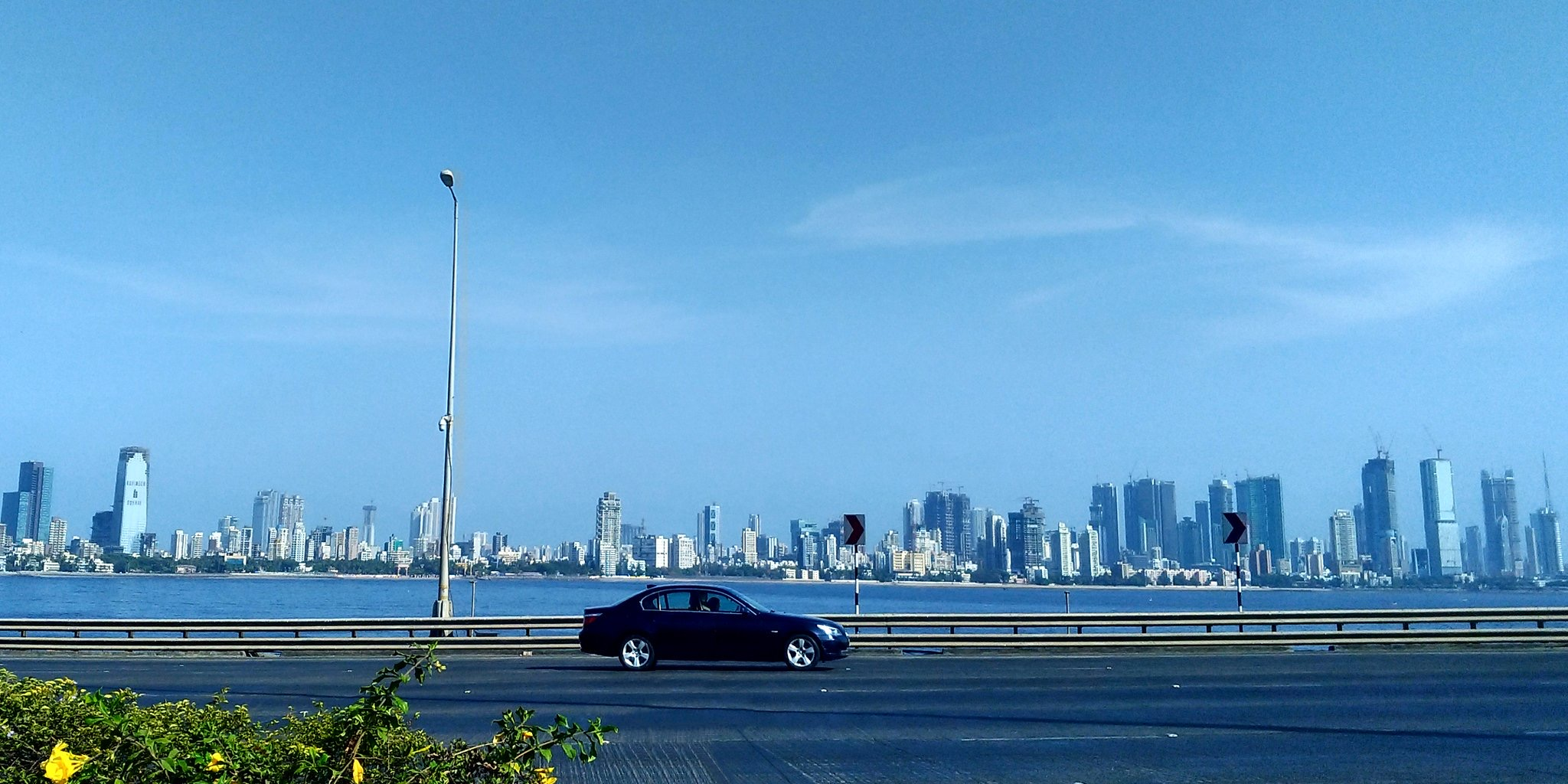
The skyline of Mumbai's Worli and Dadar as viewed from Bandra.

This article ranks the tallest buildings in India that are at least 200 metres (656 ft) in height, based on standard height measurements as defined by the Council on Tall Buildings and Urban Habitat. These measurements include spires and other architectural elements but exclude antenna masts. Only habitable buildings are included in this list, thereby excluding structures such as radio masts and towers, observation towers, temples, chimneys, and other non-habitable architectural structures.

The development of initial skyscrapers in India began with the completion of the LIC Building in Chennai in 1959. Comprising 12 floors, it was the first skyscraper in the country and remained the tallest building in India until 1961, when it was surpassed by the 25-storey Usha Kiran Building in Mumbai. Since then, numerous taller buildings have been constructed across various cities.

As of May 2026, Lokhandwala Minerva, located in Mumbai, is the tallest completed building in India, standing at 301 metres (988 feet) and 78 floors. Several taller buildings are either under construction or currently on hold.

Mumbai leads the country in vertical development, with nearly 300 skyscrapers and approximately 5,600 high-rise buildings within the Mumbai Metropolitan Region. In southern India, Hyderabad has seen a significant construction boom in recent years, with 71 completed or topped out skyscrapers and 224 skyscrapers under construction. The Delhi National Capital Region (NCR) has also experienced rapid urban development in its suburbs over the past two decades, featuring 28 skyscrapers and around 5,200 high-rise buildings. Kolkata has 15 existing skyscrapers and around 1,000 high-rise buildings. Other major cities with a notable presence of high-rise developments include Bengaluru, Chennai, Pune, and Kochi.

== Tallest buildings ==
This list includes buildings that have been completed or have topped out. Architectural height is used; therefore masts and other elements are discounted in height measurement. This includes spires and architectural details, but does not include antenna masts. The buildings in this list are above 200 metres (656 ft).

Was the tallest building in India upon completion
Indicates buildings still under construction that have been architecturally topped out but not yet fully opened

Rank	Name	Image	City	Height	Floors	Year	Building type	Reference(s)
1	Lokhandwala Minerva		Mumbai	301 metres (988 ft)	78	2023	Residential	
2	Palais Royale		Mumbai	297.50 metres (976 ft)	84	2026	Residential	
3	Piramal Aranya Arav		Mumbai	282.2 metres (926 ft)	83	2022	Residential	
4	World One		Mumbai	280.2 metres (919 ft)	76	2020	Residential	
5	World View		Mumbai	277.6 metres (911 ft)	73	2020	Residential	
6	Lodha Trump Tower		Mumbai	268 metres (879 ft)	76	2020	Residential	
6	Lodha Marquise		Mumbai	268 metres (879 ft)	76	2020	Residential	
6	Lodha Allura		Mumbai	268 metres (879 ft)	76	2020	Residential	
6	Lodha Parkside		Mumbai	268 metres (879 ft)	76	2020	Residential	
6	Lodha Kiara		Mumbai	268 metres (879 ft)	76	2020	Residential	
11	Piramal Mahalaxmi North Tower		Mumbai	267.6 metres (878 ft)	77	2025	Residential	
12	Omkar 1973 Tower A		Mumbai	267 metres (876 ft)	73	2021	Residential	
12	Omkar 1973 Tower B		Mumbai	267 metres (876 ft)	73	2021	Residential	
14	Nathani Heights		Mumbai	262 metres (860 ft)	72	2020	Residential	
15	Three Sixty West Tower B		Mumbai	260 metres (853 ft)	66	2021	Commercial	
15	The 42		Kolkata	260 metres (853 ft)	65	2018	Residential	
15	One Avighna Park		Mumbai	260 metres (853 ft)	64	2017	Residential	
18	Rustomjee Crown Tower A		Mumbai	259 metres (850 ft)	69	2023	Residential	
18	Rustomjee Crown Tower B		Mumbai	259 metres (850 ft)	69	2023	Residential	
20	The Imperial I		Mumbai	256 metres (840 ft)	60	2010	Residential	
20	The Imperial II		Mumbai	256 metres (840 ft)	60	2010	Residential	
22	Three Sixty West Tower A		Mumbai	255.6 metres (839 ft)	52	2020	Commercial	
23	Birla Niyaara Tower 1		Mumbai	255 (837)	75	2026	Residential	
24	Four Seasons Private Residences		Mumbai	250 metres (820 ft)	55	2022	Residential	
24	Ahuja Towers		Mumbai	250 metres (820 ft)	55	2019	Residential	
26	Crescent Bay Tower 6		Mumbai	239.7 metres (786 ft)	62	2019	Residential	
27	SAS Crown Tower 1		Hyderabad	235.3 metres (772 ft)	58	2025	Residential	
27	SAS Crown Tower 2		Hyderabad	235.3 metres (772 ft)	58	2025	Residential	
27	SAS Crown Tower 3		Hyderabad	235.3 metres (772 ft)	58	2025	Residential	
30	Auris Serenity Tower 1		Mumbai	235 metres (771 ft)	69	2018	Residential	
30	Auris Serenity Tower 2		Mumbai	235 metres (771 ft)	69	2019	Residential	
30	Auris Serenity Tower 3		Mumbai	235 metres (771 ft)	69	2021	Residential	
33	Raheja Altimus		Mumbai	225.4 (740)	46	2024	Commercial	
34	Salsette 27 Tower A		Mumbai	225.2 metres (739 ft)	64	2023	Residential	
34	Salsette 27 Tower B		Mumbai	225.2 metres (739 ft)	64	2023	Residential	
36	Oberoi Commerz		Mumbai	225 metres (738 ft)	51	2023	Commercial	
36	Indiabulls Sky Forest Tower 1		Mumbai	225 metres (738 ft)	62	2022	Residential	
36	Indiabulls Sky Forest Tower 2		Mumbai	225 metres (738 ft)	62	2022	Residential	
39	Two ICC		Mumbai	223.2 metres (732 ft)	68	2018	Residential	
40	Crescent Bay Tower 5		Mumbai	222.5 metres (730 ft)	63	2019	Residential	
41	World Crest		Mumbai	222.5 metres (730 ft)	57	2017	Residential	
42	Lodha Bellissimo Tower 1		Mumbai	222 metres (728 ft)	53	2012	Residential	
42	Lodha Bellissimo Tower 2		Mumbai	222 metres (728 ft)	53	2012	Residential	
44	Indiabulls Sky Blu		Mumbai	220 metres (722 ft)	56	2019	Residential + commercial	
44	Oberoi Sky City Tower A		Mumbai	220 metres (722 ft)	67	2021	Residential	
44	Oberoi Sky City Tower B		Mumbai	220 metres (722 ft)	67	2021	Residential	
44	Oberoi Sky City Tower C		Mumbai	220 metres (722 ft)	67	2021	Residential	
44	Oberoi Sky City Tower D		Mumbai	220 metres (722 ft)	67	2021	Residential	
44	Oberoi Sky City Tower E		Mumbai	220 metres (722 ft)	67	2021	Residential	
50	Omkar Alta Monte Tower B		Mumbai	218 metres (715 ft)	65	2019	Residential	
51	Piramal Mahalaxmi Central Tower		Mumbai	215.76 metres (708 ft)	60	2025	Residential	
52	Century Mills Tower		Mumbai	215.5 metres (707 ft)	51	2014	Commercial	
53	Raheja Imperia		Mumbai	214 metres (702 ft)	52	2020	Residential	
54	Cyberthum Tower A		Noida	213.7 metres (701 ft)	50	2025	Commercial	
54	Cyberthum Tower B		Noida	213.7 metres (701 ft)	50	2025	Commercial	
56	Lodha Venezia A		Mumbai	213.5 metres (700 ft)	68	2017	Residential	
56	Lodha Venezia B		Mumbai	213.5 metres (700 ft)	68	2021	Residential	
58	Piramal Mahalaxmi South Tower		Mumbai	213.4 metres (700 ft)	59	2025	Residential	
59	Monte South Tower 1		Mumbai	210 metres (689 ft)	60	2022	Residential	
59	Orchid Enclave		Mumbai	210 metres (689 ft)	56	2017	Residential	
61	The Amaryllis Iconic Tower		Delhi	208 metres (682 ft)	49	2025	Residential	
62	Orbit Terraces		Mumbai	207 metres (679 ft)	61	2021	Residential	
63	Crescent Bay Tower 4		Mumbai	206 metres (676 ft)	58	2019	Residential	
64	The Trilight Tower 1 (Canopus)		Hyderabad	202.45 metres (664 ft)	57	2026	Residential	
65	Kohinoor Square Tower A		Mumbai	201.9 metres (662 ft)	50	2019	Commercial	
66	Trump Tower Delhi NCR Tower 1		Gurugram	201.53 metres (661 ft)	55	2024	Residential + commercial	
66	Trump Tower Delhi NCR Tower 2		Gurugram	201.53 metres (661 ft)	55	2024	Residential + commercial	
68	Myscape Yoo Residences		Hyderabad	201.1 metres (660 ft)	59	2026	Residential	
69	Celestia Spaces Tower A		Mumbai	201 metres (659 ft)	59	2022	Residential	
69	Celestia Spaces Tower B		Mumbai	201 metres (659 ft)	59	2022	Residential	
69	Oberoi Enigma Tower 1		Mumbai	201 metres (659 ft)	58	2023	Residential	
69	Oberoi Enigma Tower 2		Mumbai	201 metres (659 ft)	58	2023	Residential	
69	Kalpataru Avana		Mumbai	201 metres (659 ft)	52	2019	Residential	
74	Oberoi Eternia Tower A		Mumbai	200.3 metres (657 ft)	60	2023	Residential	
74	Oberoi Eternia Tower B		Mumbai	200.3 metres (657 ft)	60	2023	Residential	
74	Oberoi Eternia Tower C		Mumbai	200.3 metres (657 ft)	60	2023	Residential	
77	Crescent Bay Tower 3		Mumbai	200 metres (656 ft)	56	2022	Residential	

== Tallest buildings by city ==
This list includes cities in India with completed or topped-out buildings taller than 100 metres (328 ft) or 25 floors.

	City	Tallest building	Height	Floors	Year	Building type	Reference(s)
1	Mumbai	Lokhandwala Minerva	301 metres (988 ft)	78	2023	Residential	
2	Kolkata	The 42	260 metres (853 ft)	65	2018	Residential	
3	Hyderabad	SAS Crown	235.3 metres (772 ft)	58	2024	Residential	
4	Noida	Cyberthum Towers	213.7 metres (701 ft)	50	2024	Commercial	
5	Delhi	The Amaryllis Iconic Tower	208 metres (682 ft)	49	2025	Residential	
6	Gurugram	Trump Towers Delhi NCR	201.53 metres (661 ft)	55	2024	Commercial + Residential	
7	Navi Mumbai	Arihant Aalishan	195 metres (640 ft)	53	2025	Residential	
8	Thane	The Address	193 metres (633 ft)	60	2025	Residential	
9	Chennai	Highliving District Tower H	172 metres (564 ft)	47	2020	Residential	
10	Pune	Amanora Gateway Towers	165 metres (541 ft)	45	2021	Residential	
11	Bengaluru	CNTC Presidential Tower	161 metres (528 ft)	50	2023	Residential	
12	Kochi	Sands Infinit Towers	152 metres (499 ft)	30	2025	Commercial	
13	Ahmedabad	Mondeal One	146 metres (479 ft)	36	2023	Commercial	
14	Faridabad	Ansal Royal Heritage	140 metres (459 ft)	33	2017	Residential	
15	Mangaluru	Land Trades Altura	140 metres (459 ft)	34	2025	Residential	
16	Kozhikode	Galaxy Magnum Opus	130 metres (427 ft)	38	2020	Residential	
17	Nagpur	The Rise	126.75 metres (416 ft)	37	2025	Residential	
18	Thiruvananthapuram	Nikunjam iPark	123 metres (404 ft)	35	2012	Residential	
19	GIFT City	GIFT One Tower	122 metres (400 ft)	29	2013	Commercial	
20	Ludhiana	AGI Sky Villas Tower A	118.16 metres (388 ft)	32	2026	Residential	
21	Vishakhapatnam	Lansum Oxygen Towers	105 metres (344 ft)	35	2017	Residential	
22	Bhubaneswar	Z1 Nirvaana	105 metres (344 ft)	35	2026	Residential	
23	Kanpur	Emerald Garden Iconic Tower	100 metres (328 ft)	27	2018	Residential	
24	Mohali	Homeland Heights	100 metres (328 ft)	28	2019	Residential	
25	Surat	Casa Rivera	92.73 metres (304 ft)	26	2021	Residential	
26	Jalandhar	Jalandhar Heights III Towers A–D	83.29 metres (273 ft)	25	2026	Residential	

== Cities with the most skyscrapers ==
City	State/UT	≥ 300 m	≥ 200 m	≥ 150 m
Mumbai	Maharashtra	1	87	245
Hyderabad	Telangana	0	5	71
Thane	Maharashtra	0	0	36
Navi Mumbai	Maharashtra	0	0	17
Kolkata	West Bengal	0	1	15
Gurugram	Haryana	0	2	14
Noida	Uttar Pradesh	0	2	12
Delhi	NCR	0	1	2
Chennai	Tamil Nadu	0	0	2
Bengaluru	Karnataka	0	0	2
Pune	Maharashtra	0	0	2
Kochi	Kerala	0	0	2
Total		1	98	420

== Tallest buildings (under-construction) ==
This lists ranks buildings that are under construction in India and are planned to rise at least 200 metres (656 ft) or 65 floors tall. Buildings that are only approved, on hold or proposed are not included in this table.

Name	Location	Height	Floors	Expected year of completion	Reference(s)
Ocean Tower 1	Mumbai	331 metres (1,086 ft)	74	2030	
Ocean Tower 2	Mumbai	331 metres (1,086 ft)	74	2030	
Sugee Empire Tower	Mumbai	311 metres (1,020 ft)	67	2028	
Aaradhya Avaan Tower 1	Mumbai	307 metres (1,007 ft)	80	2028	
Century IT Park	Mumbai	300 metres (984 ft)	70	2027	
Prestige Liberty North Tower	Mumbai	300 metres (984 ft)	63	2030	
Aaradhya Avaan Tower 2	Mumbai	295 metres (968 ft)	77	2028	
Indiabulls Sky Suites	Mumbai	291 metres (955 ft)	75	Unknown	
Lodha Park Adrina	Mumbai	268 metres (879 ft)	70	2025	
Ruparel Ariana	Mumbai	266.66 metres (875 ft) (Note: estimate by Emporis)	74	2025	
Candeur Skyline Tower 1	Hyderabad	244.3 metres (802 ft)	59	2029	
Candeur Skyline Tower 2	Hyderabad	244.3 metres (802 ft)	59	2029	
Candeur Skyline Tower 3	Hyderabad	244.3 metres (802 ft)	59	2029	
Candeur Skyline Tower 4	Hyderabad	244.3 metres (802 ft)	59	2029	
Skyven	Hyderabad	239.9 metres (787 ft)	63	2030	
Navanaami One	Hyderabad	235.6 metres (773 ft)	64	2030	
Raheja Artesia	Mumbai	233 metres (764 ft)	60	2024	
Eon Tower	Mumbai	230 metres (755 ft)	61	Unknown	
Sree Varaaha Aurum Tower A	Hyderabad	229.7 metres (754 ft)	56	2031	
Northern Hills	Mumbai	229 metres (751 ft)	67	2026	
Sree Varaaha Aurum Tower B	Hyderabad	228.2 metres (749 ft)	56	2031	
Godrej Sky	Mumbai	226 metres (741 ft)	67	2024	
Lansum Encanto Tower A	Hyderabad	223.9 metres (735 ft)	61	2029	
Lansum Encanto Tower B	Hyderabad	223.9 metres (735 ft)	61	2029	
Lansum Encanto Tower C	Hyderabad	223.9 metres (735 ft)	61	2029	
My Home 99	Hyderabad	223 metres (732 ft)	54	2028	
Sree Varaaha Aurum Tower C	Hyderabad	221.6 metres (727 ft)	56	2031	
Sree Varaaha Aurum Tower D	Hyderabad	221.6 metres (727 ft)	56	2031	
One by MSN Tower A	Hyderabad	220.83 metres (725 ft)	57	2030	
One by MSN Tower B	Hyderabad	220.83 metres (725 ft)	57	2030	
One by MSN Tower C	Hyderabad	220.83 metres (725 ft)	57	2030	
One by MSN Tower D	Hyderabad	220.83 metres (725 ft)	57	2030	
One by MSN Tower E	Hyderabad	220.83 metres (725 ft)	57	2030	
The Cascades Tower 1	Hyderabad	218 metres (715 ft)	59	2030	
The Cascades Tower 2	Hyderabad	218 metres (715 ft)	59	2030	
The Cascades Tower 3	Hyderabad	218 metres (715 ft)	59	2030	
The Cascades Tower 4	Hyderabad	218 metres (715 ft)	59	2030	
The Cascades Tower 5	Hyderabad	218 metres (715 ft)	59	2030	
Cyberthum Tower 1	Noida	214 metres (702 ft)	50	2025	
Cyberthum Tower 2	Noida	213 metres (699 ft)	50	2024	
Vrindavan Chandrodaya Mandir	Mathura	213 metres (699 ft)	70	2028	
Brigade Gateway Tower A	Hyderabad	212 metres (696 ft)	58	2029	
Brigade Gateway Tower B	Hyderabad	212 metres (696 ft)	58	2029	
My Home Grava Residences Tower 1	Hyderabad	211.9 metres (695 ft)	54	2028	
Sumadhura Palais Royale Tower 1	Hyderabad	211 metres (692 ft)	54	2030	
Pavani Mirai	Hyderabad	211 metres (692 ft)	51	2028	
Anantam 85 Tower A	Gurgaon	210 metres (689 ft)	60	2029	
Anantam 85 Tower B	Gurgaon	210 metres (689 ft)	60	2029	
Anantam 85 Tower C	Gurgaon	210 metres (689 ft)	60	2029	
Marathon Monte South 1	Mumbai	210 metres (689 ft)	60	2027	
Piramal Aranya Ahan	Mumbai	206.6 metres (678 ft)	60	2027	
Discovery Offices	Mumbai	205 metres (673 ft)	50	2024	
Sheth Beaumonte Tower A	Mumbai	204 metres (669 ft)	60	2024	
Sheth Beaumonte Tower B	Mumbai	204 metres (669 ft)	60	2024	
Poulomi Pallazzo Tower 1	Hyderabad	204 metres (669 ft)	55	2028	
Poulomi Pallazzo Tower 2	Hyderabad	204 metres (669 ft)	55	2028	
Poulomi Pallazzo Tower 3	Hyderabad	204 metres (669 ft)	55	2028	
The Marquise Tower 3	Hyderabad	204 metres (669 ft)	51	2028	
Brigade World Trade Center	Hyderabad	204 metres (669 ft)	50	2029	
Raghava Cinq Tower 1	Hyderabad	202.75 metres (665 ft)	63	2031	
Raghava Cinq Tower 2	Hyderabad	202.75 metres (665 ft)	63	2031	
Raghava Cinq Tower 3	Hyderabad	202.75 metres (665 ft)	63	2031	
Raghava Cinq Tower 4	Hyderabad	202.75 metres (665 ft)	63	2031	
Raghava Cinq Tower 5	Hyderabad	202.75 metres (665 ft)	63	2031	
The Trilight Tower 1	Hyderabad	202.45 metres (664 ft)	57	2027	
Lansum Elena Tower 1	Hyderabad	202 metres (663 ft)	59	2028	
Lansum Elena Tower 2	Hyderabad	202 metres (663 ft)	59	2028	
Myscape Yoo Residences	Hyderabad	201.1 metres (660 ft)	52	2027	
Auris Bliss	Mumbai	200 metres (656 ft)	50	2027	
Prestige Liberty South Tower	Mumbai	200 metres (656 ft)	43	2030	
Oberoi Skycity Tower F	Mumbai	200 metres (656 ft)	67	2027	
Oberoi Skycity Tower G	Mumbai	200 metres (656 ft)	67	2027	
Summer Trinity Vertical	Mumbai	200 metres (656 ft)	51	2024	

== Proposed, approved, or on hold ==
=== On hold ===
This list ranks buildings that were once under construction and are now on hold and are planned to rise at least 200 m (660 ft) or 40 floors tall.

Name	City	Planned height	Floors	Reference(s)
Namaste Tower	Mumbai	310 metres (1,017 ft)	63	
Supertech Supernova Spira	Noida	300 metres (984 ft)	80	Although the lower floors of the building are occupied, construction above the 64th floor has been on hold since 2020. Revised plans indicate an elevation of only 68 floors.
Urbana Twisted Tower	Kolkata	300 metres (984 ft)	75	
Brys Buzz	Noida	300 metres (984 ft)	82	
Orchid Heights 1	Mumbai	274 metres (899 ft)	63	
Sesen	Mumbai	270 metres (886 ft)	67	
Omkar 1973 Tower C	Mumbai	267 metres (876 ft)	73	
Supertech North Eye	Noida	255 metres (837 ft)	66	On hold.
STG STAR LIVING	Thane	235.7 metres (773 ft)	72	
Orchid Heights 2	Mumbai	201 metres (659 ft)	49	

=== Proposed or approved ===
This list ranks buildings that are approved or proposed and are planned to rise at least 200 m (660 ft) or 50 floors tall.

Name	Status	City	Planned height	Floors	Reference(s)
Lodha Project Wadala	Proposed	Mumbai	530 metres (1,739 ft)	101	
Joyus Housing	Proposed	Mumbai	486 metres (1,594 ft)	125	
GIFT Diamond Tower – 1	Approved	GIFT City	410 metres (1,345 ft)	86	
Shreepati Garden Tower 1	Approved	Mumbai	400 metres (1,312 ft)	110	
Shreepati Garden Tower 2	Approved	Mumbai	400 metres (1,312 ft)	110	
Celestia Spaces 1	Proposed	Mumbai	400 metres (1,312 ft)	80	
Celestia Spaces 2	Proposed	Mumbai	400 metres (1,312 ft)	80	
Celestia Spaces 3	Proposed	Mumbai	400 metres (1,312 ft)	80	
Celestia Spaces 4	Proposed	Mumbai	400 metres (1,312 ft)	80	
Celestia Spaces 5	Proposed	Mumbai	400 metres (1,312 ft)	80	
Celestia Spaces 6	Proposed	Mumbai	400 metres (1,312 ft)	80	
Celestia Spaces 7	Proposed	Mumbai	400 metres (1,312 ft)	80	
Celestia Spaces 8	Proposed	Mumbai	400 metres (1,312 ft)	80	
Matru Mandir	Proposed	Mumbai	325 metres (1,066 ft)	100	
Shreepati Skies	Approved	Mumbai	301 metres (988 ft)	88	
Waves	Proposed	Mumbai	301 metres (988 ft)	80	
Indra Tower	Proposed	Mumbai	300 metres (984 ft)	80	
Piramal Aranya Tower B	Proposed	Mumbai	280.7 metres (921 ft)	69	
Orchid Turf View Tower A	Proposed	Mumbai	273 metres (896 ft)	76	
Twisting Horizons	Proposed	Mumbai	267 metres (876 ft)	70	
Orchid Turf View Tower B	Proposed	Mumbai	265 metres (869 ft)	70	
Four Seasons Private Residences & Apartment Tower 1	Proposed	Mumbai	250 metres (820 ft)	60	
Asset Golden Sands	Proposed	Kozhikode	240 metres (787 ft)	70	
Codename Peaklife	Proposed	Bengaluru	231 metres (758 ft)	69	
Oberoi Skyz Tower 1	Proposed	Mumbai	230 metres (755 ft)	65	
Oberoi Skyz Tower 2	Proposed	Mumbai	230 metres (755 ft)	65	
Rajapushpa Presidentia 1	Approved	Hyderabad	224 metres (735 ft)	58	
Rajapushpa Presidentia 2	Approved	Hyderabad	224 metres (735 ft)	58	
Rajapushpa Presidentia 3	Approved	Hyderabad	224 metres (735 ft)	58	
Manhattan by Vamsiram	Proposed	Hyderabad	214 metres (702 ft)	55	
Shreepati Estate	Approved	Mumbai	Unknown	82	
Trident Tower 1	Proposed	Mumbai	Unknown	69	
Oberoi Sky City Tower F	Proposed	Mumbai	Unknown	69	
Oberoi Sky City Tower G	Proposed	Mumbai	Unknown	69	
Oberoi Sky City Tower H	Proposed	Mumbai	Unknown	69	
Shreepati Garden Tower 3	Approved	Mumbai	Unknown	68	
Shreepati Garden Tower 4	Approved	Mumbai	Unknown	68	
Trident Tower 2	Proposed	Mumbai	Unknown	61	

== Timeline ==
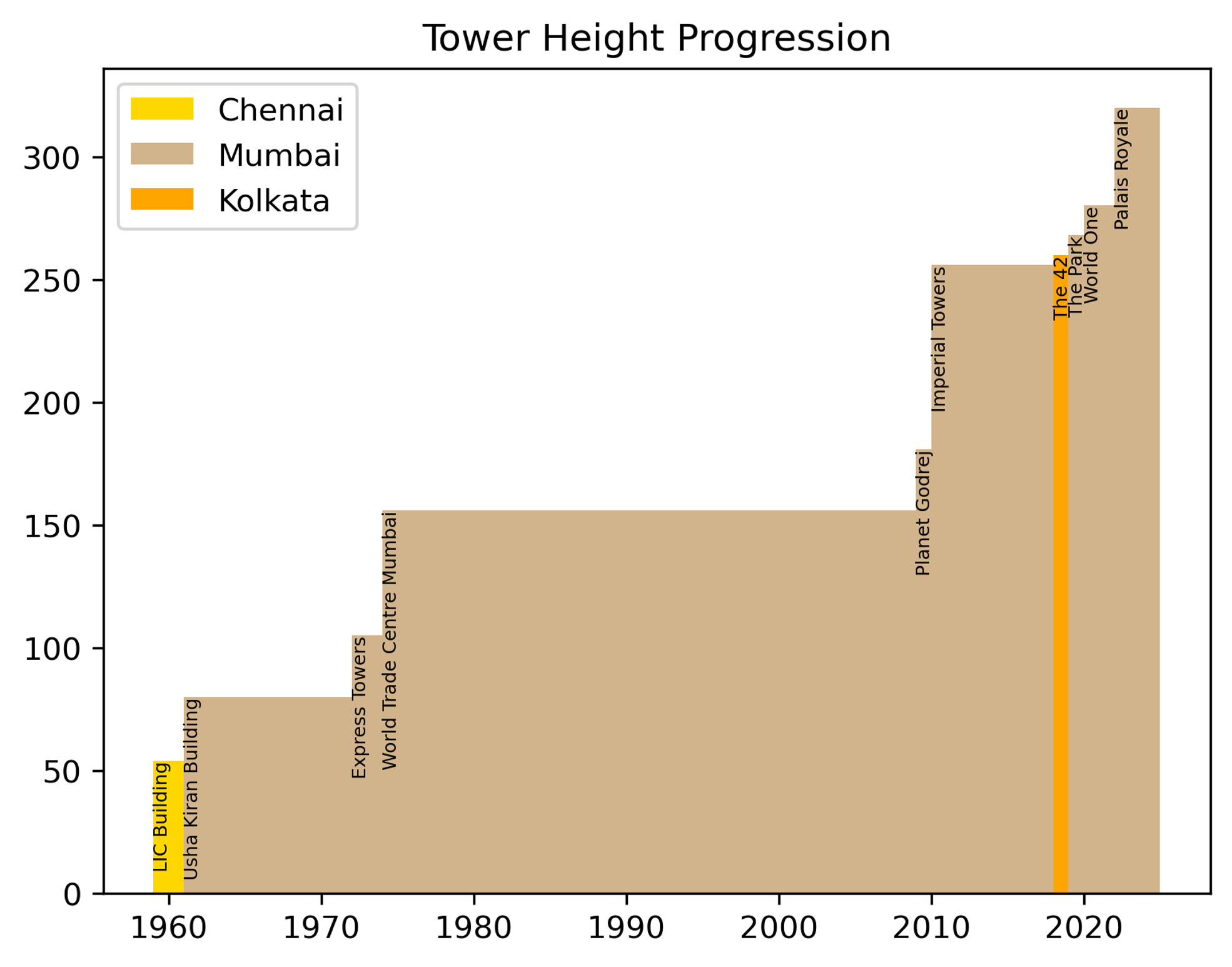
Progression of Tower Heights 1959 - 2025

Name	Image	City	Years as Tallest	Height	Floors	Ref(s)
LIC Building		Chennai	1959–1961	54 metres (177 ft)	15	
Usha Kiran Building		Mumbai	1961–1972	80 metres (262 ft)	25	
Express Towers		Mumbai	1972–1973	105 metres (344 ft)	25	
Public Utility Building		Bengaluru	1973–1973	106 metres (348 ft)	25	
Trident Hotel		Mumbai	1973–1974	117 metres (384 ft)	35	
World Trade Centre Mumbai		Mumbai	1974–2009	156 metres (512 ft)	35	
Planet Godrej		Mumbai	2009–2010	181 metres (594 ft)	51	
Imperial Towers		Mumbai	2010–2018	256 metres (840 ft)	60	
The 42		Kolkata	2018–2019	260 metres (853 ft)	65	
The Park		Mumbai	2019–2020	268 metres (879 ft)	78	
World One		Mumbai	2020–2022	280.2 metres (919 ft)	76	
Lokhandwala Minerva		Mumbai	2022–present	301 metres (988 ft)	78	

== See also ==
- List of tallest buildings and structures in the Indian subcontinent
- List of tallest buildings in different cities in India
- List of tallest buildings in Asia
- List of tallest structures in India
- List of tallest buildings in the world
- List of tallest structures in the world
