= Omkar Realtors & Developers =

Real estate company

- Type: Private
- Industry: Real Estate, Construction & Fraud
- Founded: 2003
- Founders: Babulal Varma (Incarcerated)
- Headquarters: Mumbai, India
- Area served: Mumbai Metropolitan Region
- Key people: Babulal Varma (Incarcerated)
- Products: Residential, Commercial
- Number of employees: 400 (former)

Omkar Realtors was a company started by Babulal Varma in 2003. It worked in the construction and redevelopment industry. Over the first 10 years, they redeveloped 2.5 million square feet of space in Mumbai. Some of the projects they have worked on include Omkar 1973, Omkar Vive, Sereno, and Omkar Alta Monte. Their goal was to make Mumbai a slum-free city due to being one of the most crowded cities in the world, according to an UN report.

Omkar Realtors bagged various awards for their work in different areas and projects like Sword of Honour Award for 2016 by the British Safety Council for its flagship project Omkar 1973, Worli, India's Best Luxury Project of the Year, Slum Rehabilitation Developer of the Year 2016 and Super Luxury Project of the Year 2016’ for Omkar 1973, Worli. Babulal Varma and Kamal Kishore Gupta were arrested and incarcerated by the DE for money laundering and fraud. The investigation under PMLA revealed that the loans to the tune of Rs 410 crores were "diverted and not used for intended purposes".
