= List of tallest buildings in Navi Mumbai =

Tall buildings in Navi Mumbai
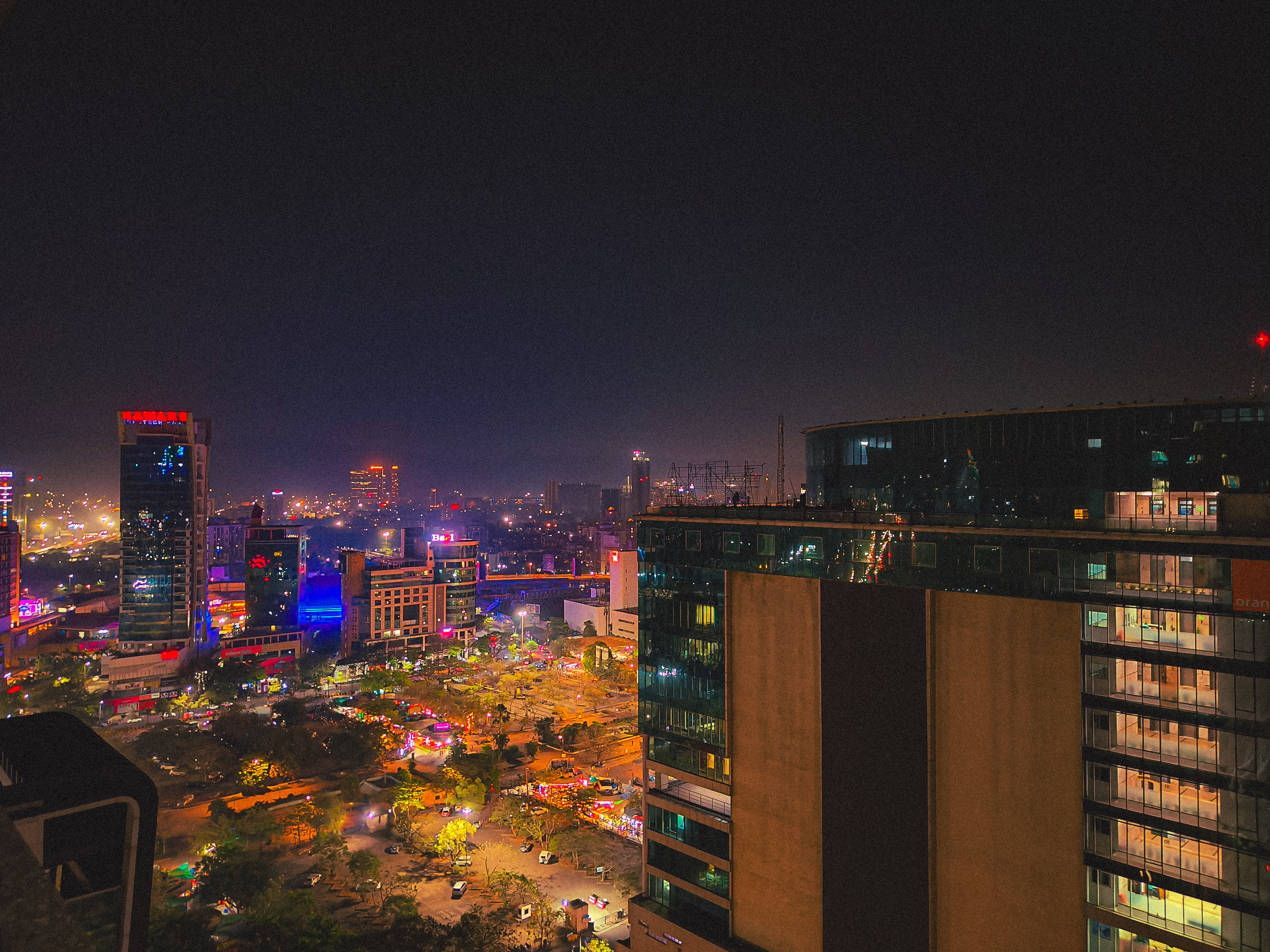
- Skyline of Navi Mumbai at night
- Tallest building: Adhiraj Samayama (2019)
- Tallest building height: 185 metres (607 ft)
- First 150 m+ building: G Square (2015)

Number of tall buildings
- Taller than 150 m (492 ft): 17 (2025)

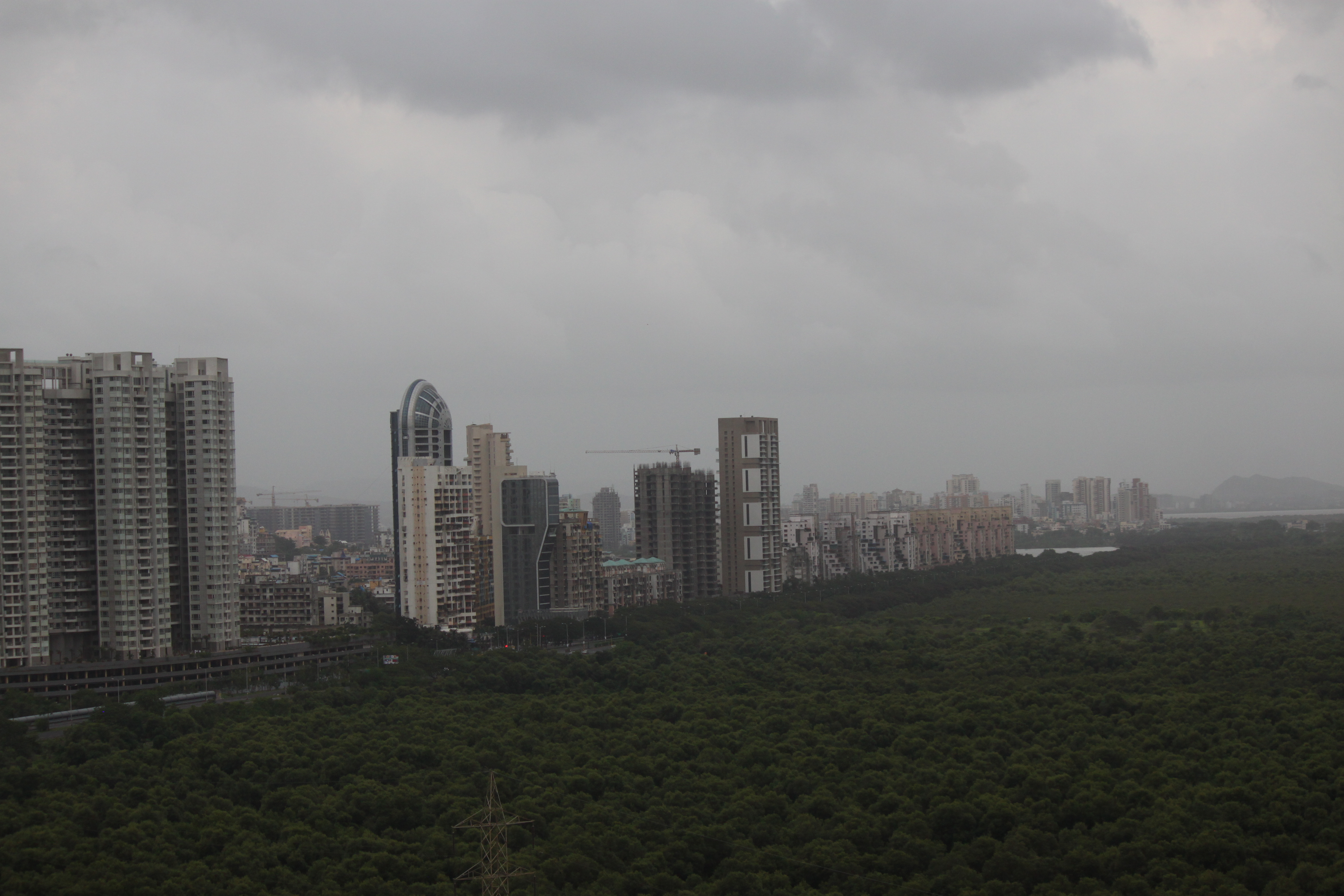
Skyline of Palm Beach Road.

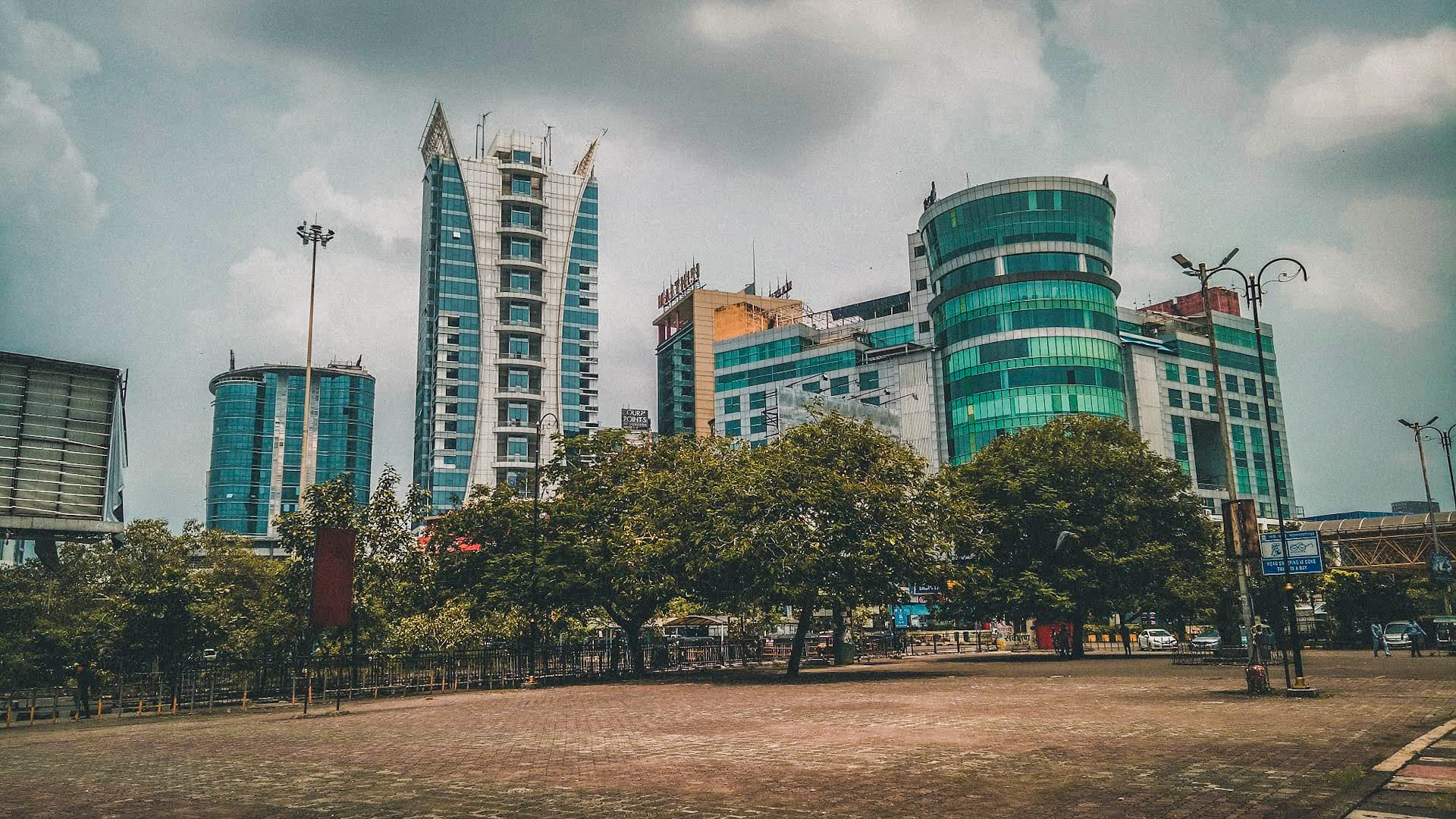
Skyline of Vashi.

This list of the tallest buildings in Navi Mumbai ranks skyscrapers and high-rise buildings in Navi Mumbai, Maharashtra, India. Navi Mumbai is a planned township and a Satellite city of Mumbai on the west coast of the Indian state of Maharashtra. The area was proposed in 1971 as a new urban township of Mumbai by the Government of Maharashtra. A new public sector undertaking, CIDCO, was established for this purpose. Navi Mumbai is situated across two districts, Thane Part and Raigad. Navi Mumbai is the largest planned city of India and the world. Currently there are more than 1,400 completed high-rise buildings in Navi Mumbai and many more high-rise buildings are under construction.

== Tallest buildings ==
This lists ranks buildings in Navi Mumbai that stand at least 100 m (330 ft) tall, based on standard height measurement. This includes spires and architectural details but does not include antenna masts. Only completed buildings, under-construction buildings, and on-hold buildings that have topped out are included.

Key:

Was the tallest building in Navi Mumbai upon completion.
Topped out but not yet completed.

Sr. no.	Name	Locale	Image	Height	Floors	Completion year	Building type	Notes
1	Arihant Aalishan T1	Kharghar 19.082388°N 73.082005°E	-	195 (640)	53	2026	Residential	Structurally topped out, completion expected in 2026.
2	Arihant Aalishan T2	Kharghar 19.082621°N 73.082433°E	-	195 (640)	53	2026	Residential	Structurally topped out, completion expected in 2026.
3	Arihant Aalishan T3	Kharghar 19.082840°N 73.082802°E	-	195 (640)	53	2026	Residential	Structurally topped out, completion expected in 2026.
4	Adhiraj Samayama A	Kharghar 19.081751°N 73.077081°E	-	185 metres (607 ft)	57	2019	Residential	
5	Adhiraj Samayama B	Kharghar 19.080700°N 73.077192°E	-	185 metres (607 ft)	57	2019	Residential	Tower B has same specifications as Tower A
6	Indiabulls Greens A	Panvel, Navi Mumbai 18.952521°N 73.147523°E	-	160 metres (525 ft) (est.)	38	2022	Residential	Height estimated as 160m as height for Overhead Structure above last habitable floor is not specified. Building is 150m+
7	Indiabulls Greens B	Panvel, Navi Mumbai 18.952226°N 73.147598°E	-	160 metres (525 ft) (est.)	38	2022	Residential	Height estimated as 160m as height for Overhead Structure above last habitable floor is not specified. Building is 150m+
8	Indiabulls Greens C	Panvel, Navi Mumbai 18.951863°N 73.147663°E	-	160 metres (525 ft) (est.)	38	2022	Residential	Height estimated as 160m as height for Overhead Structure above last habitable floor is not specified. Building is 150m+
9	Indiabulls Greens D	Panvel, Navi Mumbai 18.951363°N 73.147819°E	-	160 metres (525 ft) (est.)	38	2022	Residential	Height estimated as 160m as height for Overhead Structure above last habitable floor is not specified. Building is 150m+
10	Indiabulls Greens E	Panvel, Navi Mumbai 18.952496°N 73.148063°E	-	160 metres (525 ft) (est.)	38	2022	Residential	Height estimated as 160m as height for Overhead Structure above last habitable floor is not specified. Building is 150m+
11	Indiabulls Greens F	Panvel, Navi Mumbai 18.952253°N 73.148575°E	-	160 metres (525 ft) (est.)	38	2022	Residential	Height estimated as 160m as height for Overhead Structure above last habitable floor is not specified. Building is 150m+
12	Indiabulls Greens G	Panvel, Navi Mumbai 18.952254°N 73.148127°E	-	160 metres (525 ft) (est.)	38	2022	Residential	Height estimated as 160m as height for Overhead Structure above last habitable floor is not specified. Building is 150m+
13	Sai World Empire T1	Kharghar, Navi Mumbai 19.082699°N 73.073669°E	-	154 metres (505 ft)	42	2024	Residential	Height confirmed in RERA
14	Sai World Empire T2	Kharghar, Navi Mumbai 19.083463°N 73.073774°E	-	154 metres (505 ft)	42	2024	Residential	Height confirmed in RERA
15	Sai World Empire T3	Kharghar, Navi Mumbai 19.084011°N 73.073850°E	-	154 metres (505 ft)	42	2024	Residential	Height confirmed in RERA
16	Sai World Empire T4	Kharghar 19.082664°N 73.074631°E	-	154 (505)	42	2029	Residential	Height confirmed in RERA. Structurally Topped Out
17	Sai World Empire T5	Kharghar 19.082116°N 73.074104°E	-	154 (505)	42	2029	Residential	Height confirmed in RERA. Structurally Topped Out

== Tallest projects under construction ==
This lists ranks buildings in Navi Mumbai that stand at least 100 m (330 ft) tall that are under construction. This includes spires and architectural details but does not include antenna masts.

Total number of skyscrapers Under construction and Launched : 27

Sr. no.	Name	Locale	Height	Floors	Completion year	Building type	Notes
1	Godrej Green Terraces	Panvel 18.932950°N 73.183179°E	180 (591)	42 * 5 Towers	2032	Residential	
2	Alliance The View	Ghansoli 19.114893°N 72.996608°E	168 (551)	47	2030	Residential	Partial Approvals filed in RERA upto 39 floors but execution is upto 47 floors. Height of building calculated by adding floor to ceiling height of 8 more floors from RERA
3	Shreeji Divine	Kharghar 19.083482°N 73.071114°E	160 (525)	48 * 4 Towers	2027	Residential	Partial Approvals filed. Total number of floors is 48. Height Calculated by using floor to ceiling height from RERA for 48 floors
4	Gami The Elements	Ghansoli 19.117756°N 72.993108°E	154 (505)	46 * 5 Towers	2031	Residential	
5	Sai World Empire T3	Kharghar 19.082664°N 73.074631°E	154 (505)	42	2029	Residential	Height confirmed in RERA
6	Adhiraj Capital City	Kharghar 19.081580°N 73.078938°E	153 (502)	47 * 6 Towers	2028 - 2032	Residential	
7	Neelkanth Palm Residency	Ghansoli 19.119271°N 72.992297°E	153 (502)	45	2029	Residential	
8	Bhagwati Celestria	Airoli 19.171129°N 72.989036°E	151 (495)	46 * 3 Towers	2030	Residential	
9	Gami Satyam Skyscape	Ghansoli 19.115447°N 72.995787°E	151 (495)	46	2030	Residential	

== See also ==
- List of tallest buildings in India
- List of tallest buildings in Mumbai
- List of tallest structures in India
- List of tallest buildings and structures in the Indian subcontinent
- List of tallest buildings in Asia
- List of tallest buildings in different cities in India
- List of tallest buildings in Bangalore
