= Lokhandwala Minerva =

Supertall residential skyscraper in India

- Lokhandwala Minerva in 2026

Record height
- Tallest in India since 2023^{[I]}

General information
- Status: Completed
- Type: Supertall residential skyscraper
- Location: Mahalaxmi; Mumbai, India
- Coordinates: 18.9870497°N 72.8278304°E
- Construction started: 2011
- Completed: 2023

Height
- Roof: 301 metres (988 ft)

Technical details
- Floor count: 78 × 2

Design and construction
- Architect: Hafeez Contractor
- Developer: Lokhandwala Infrastructure
- Structural engineer: J+W Consultants

Website
- theminervamahalaxmi.com

Lokhandwala Minerva is a supertall skyscraper in Mumbai, Maharashtra, India. As of 2026, it is the tallest completed building and the first building to reach supertall height in India.

Hafeez Contractor served as the chief architect for the tower, while JW Consultants were the structural engineers. The tower underwent a redesign in 2015 which reduced the final height by 6 m (20 ft).

== Controversies ==
=== Delayed possession hearings ===
In 2023, home buyers of Lokhandwala Minerva were granted interest on delayed possession after hearings before MahaRERA, the real estate regulatory authority of Maharashtra state.

=== Breach of conditions notice ===
In May 2023, the MahaRERA issued a show-cause notice, citing breach of conditions to Lokhandwala Kataria Constructions over false advertisements claiming the tower to be 90 stories tall, against the approved 77 floors.

== See also ==
- List of tallest buildings in India
- List of tallest buildings in Mumbai
- List of tallest buildings in Asia
- List of tallest buildings and structures in the Indian subcontinent
- List of tallest structures in India
