= Lists of tallest buildings in India =

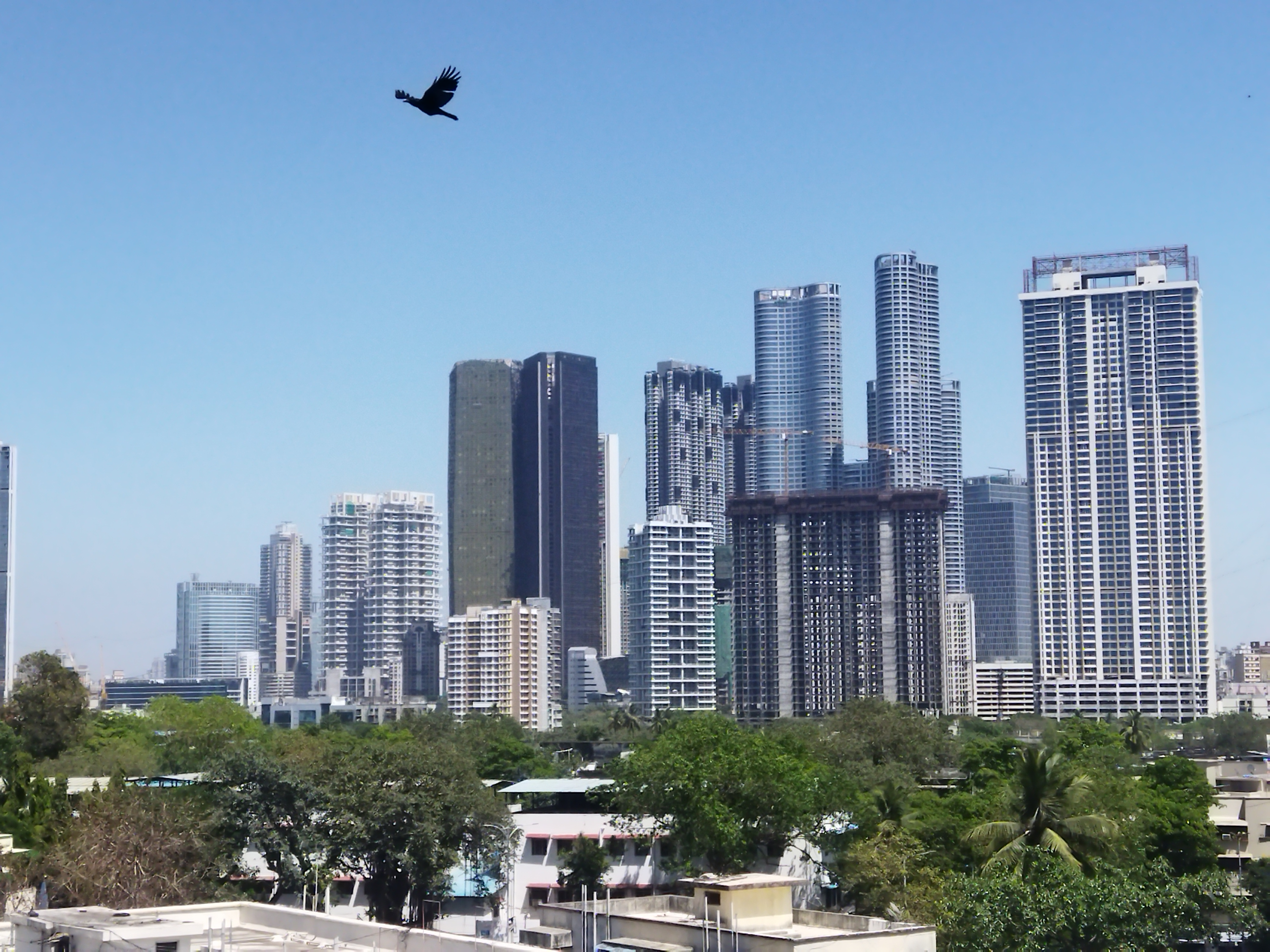
Mumbai

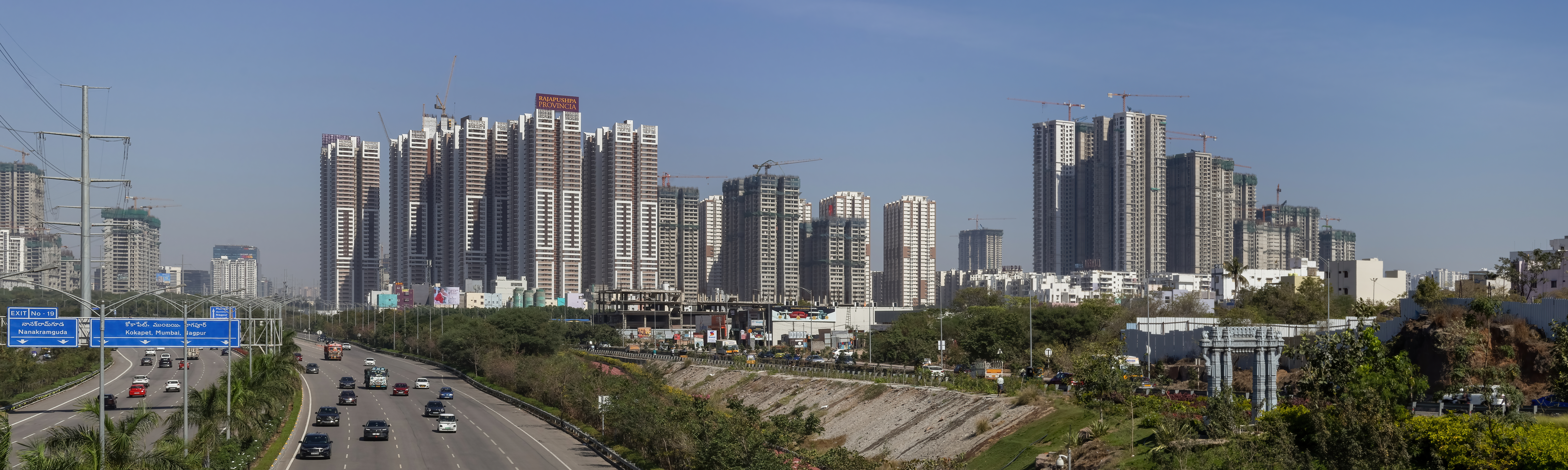
Hyderabad

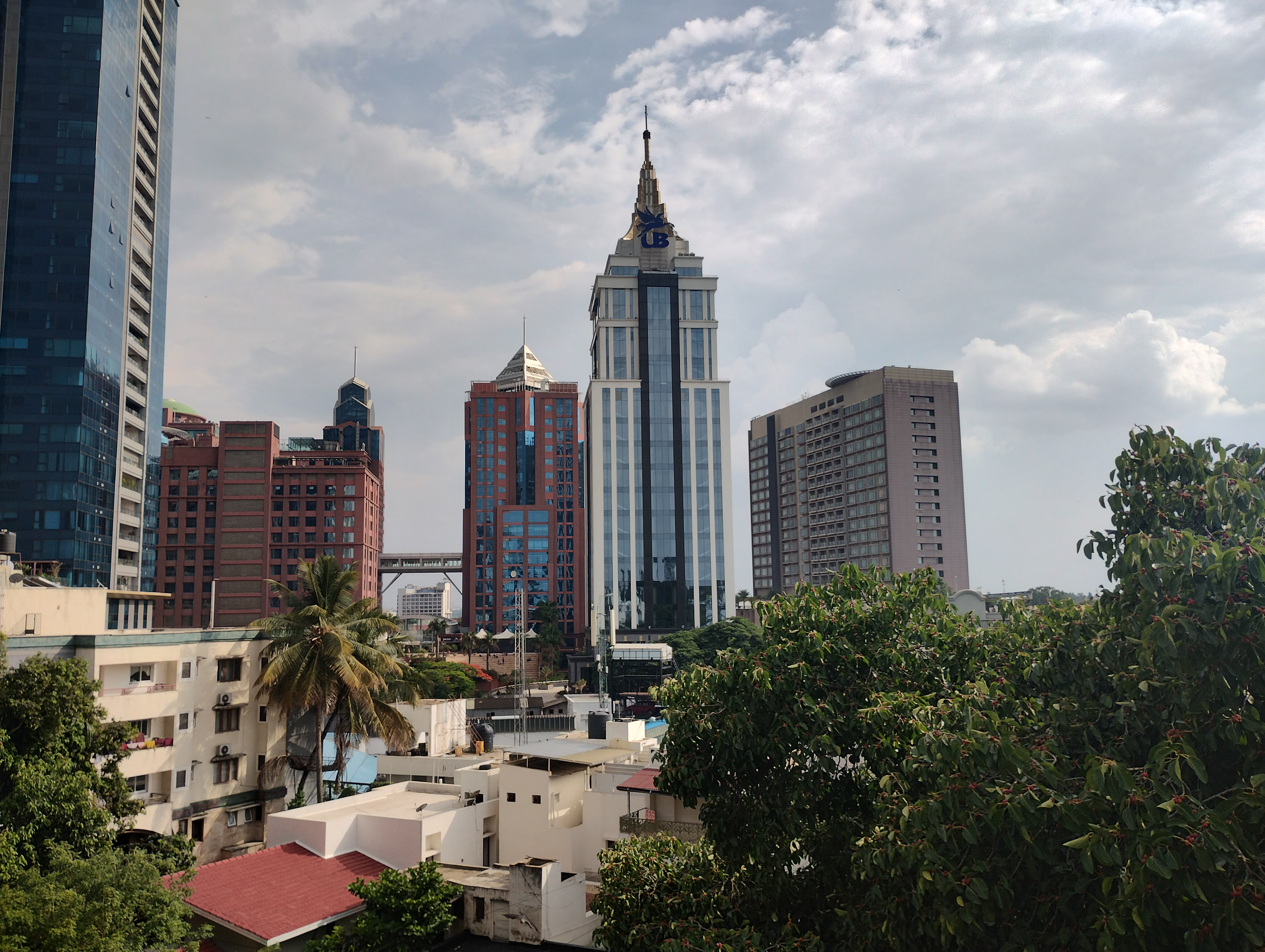
Bengaluru

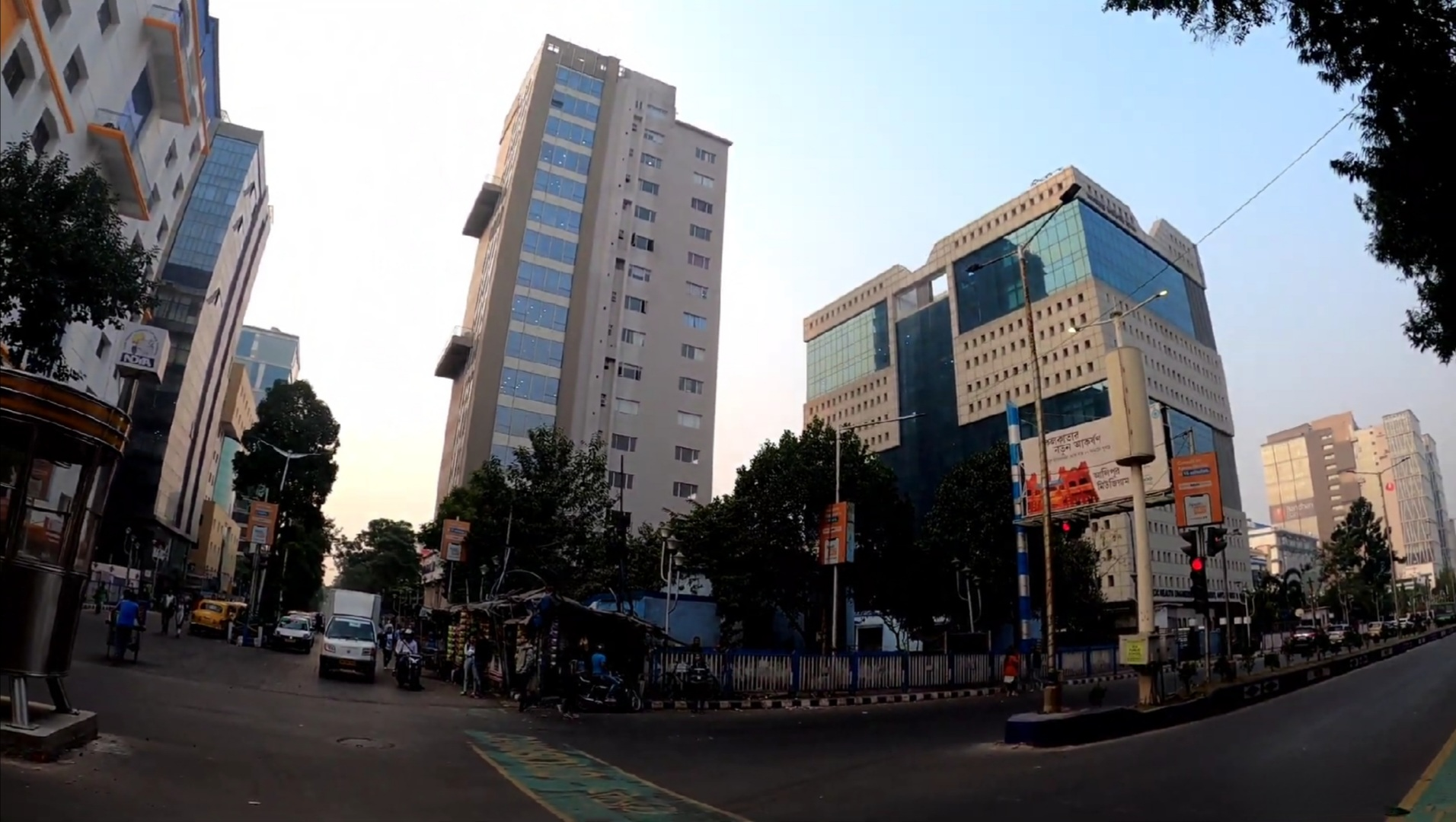
Kolkata

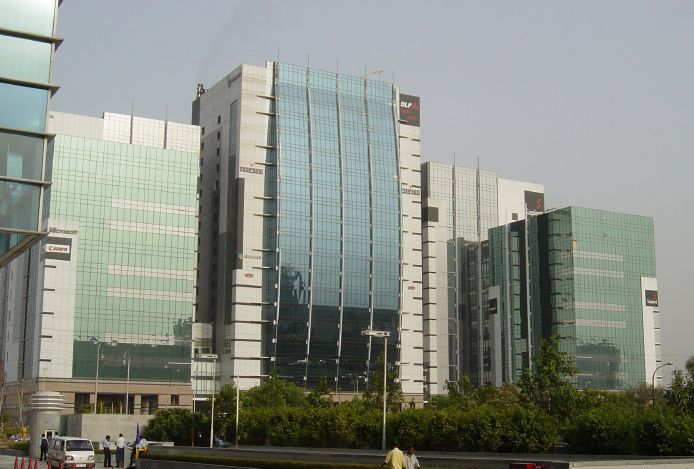
Gurgaon

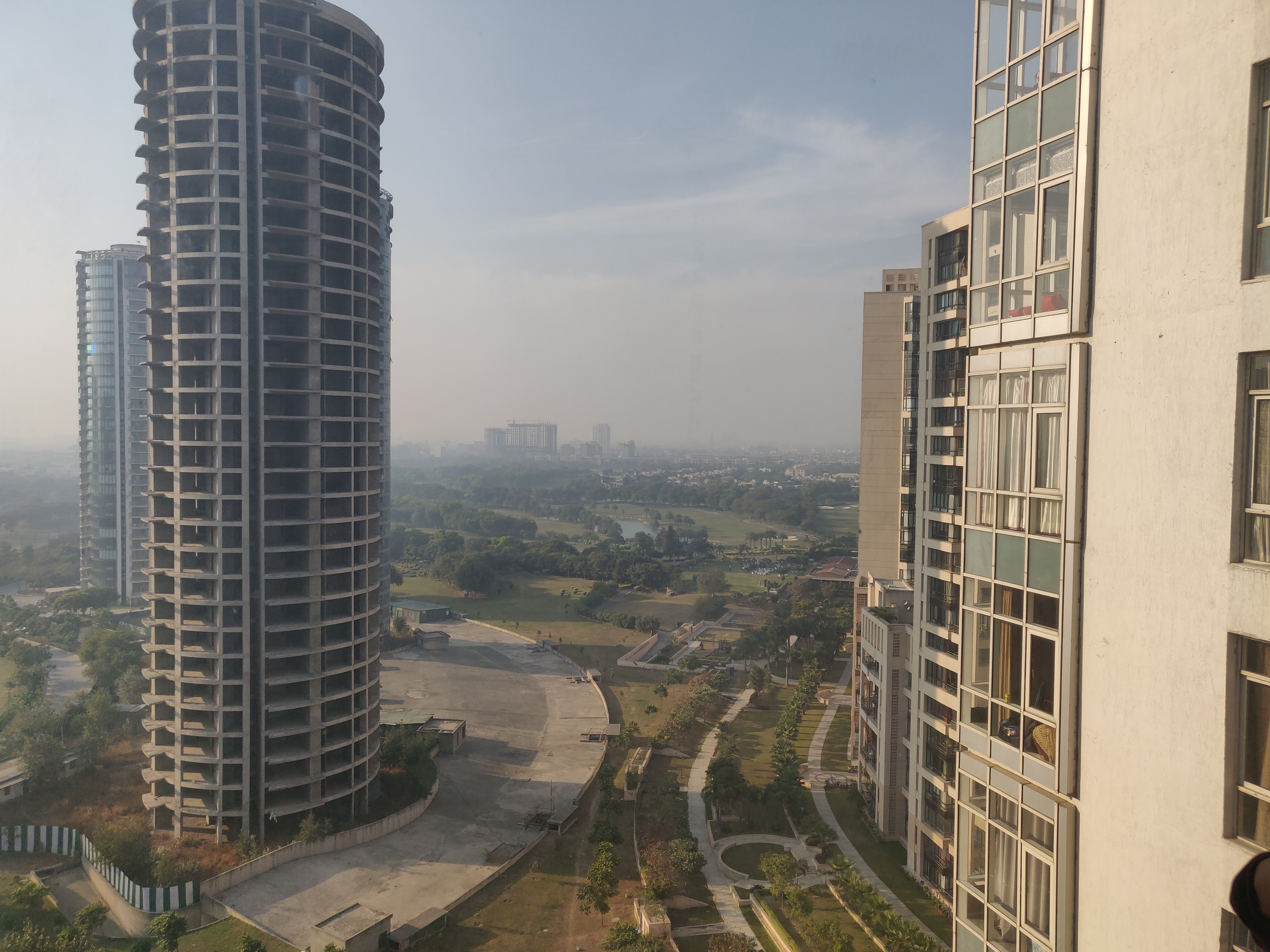
Noida

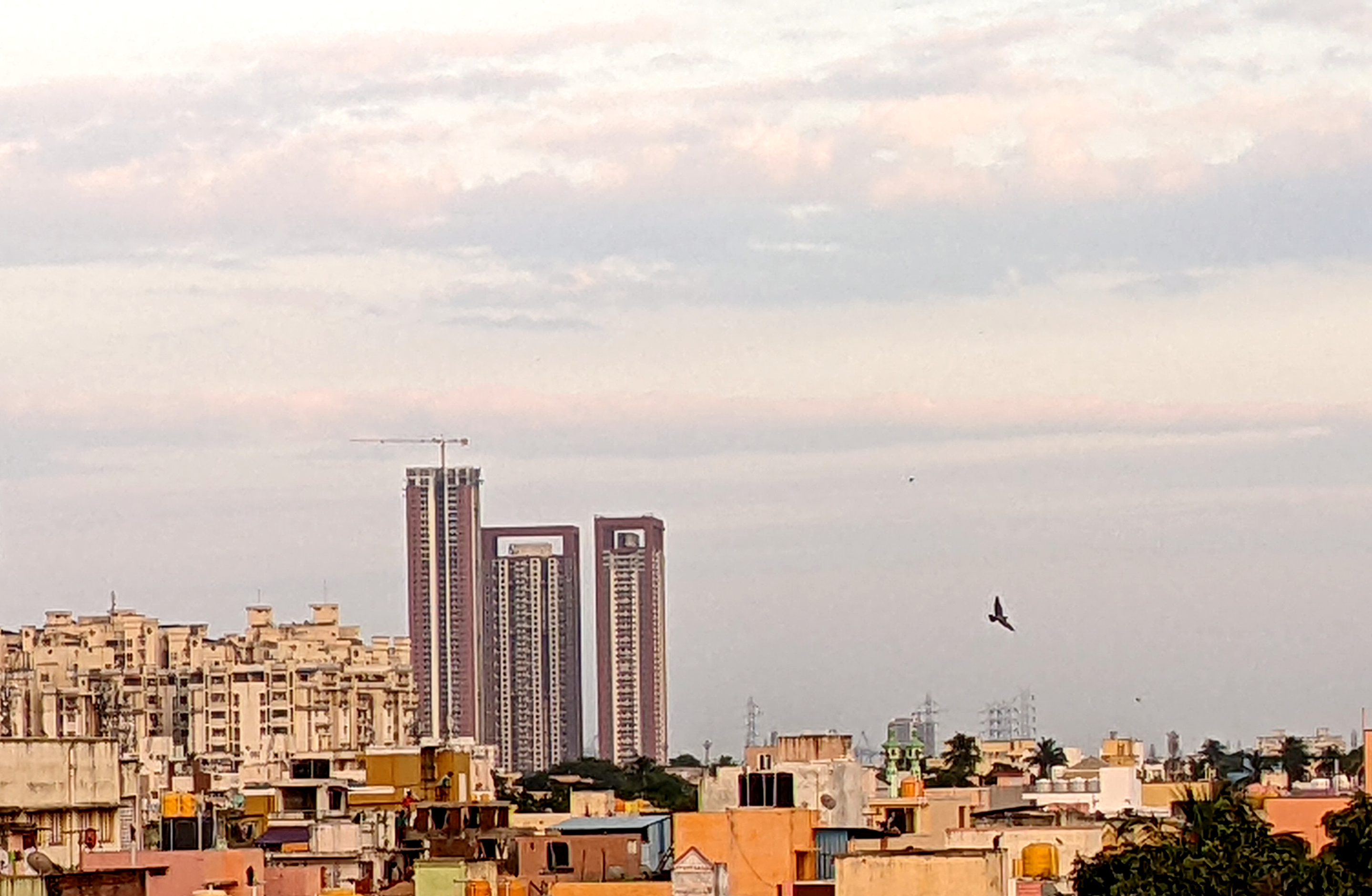
Chennai

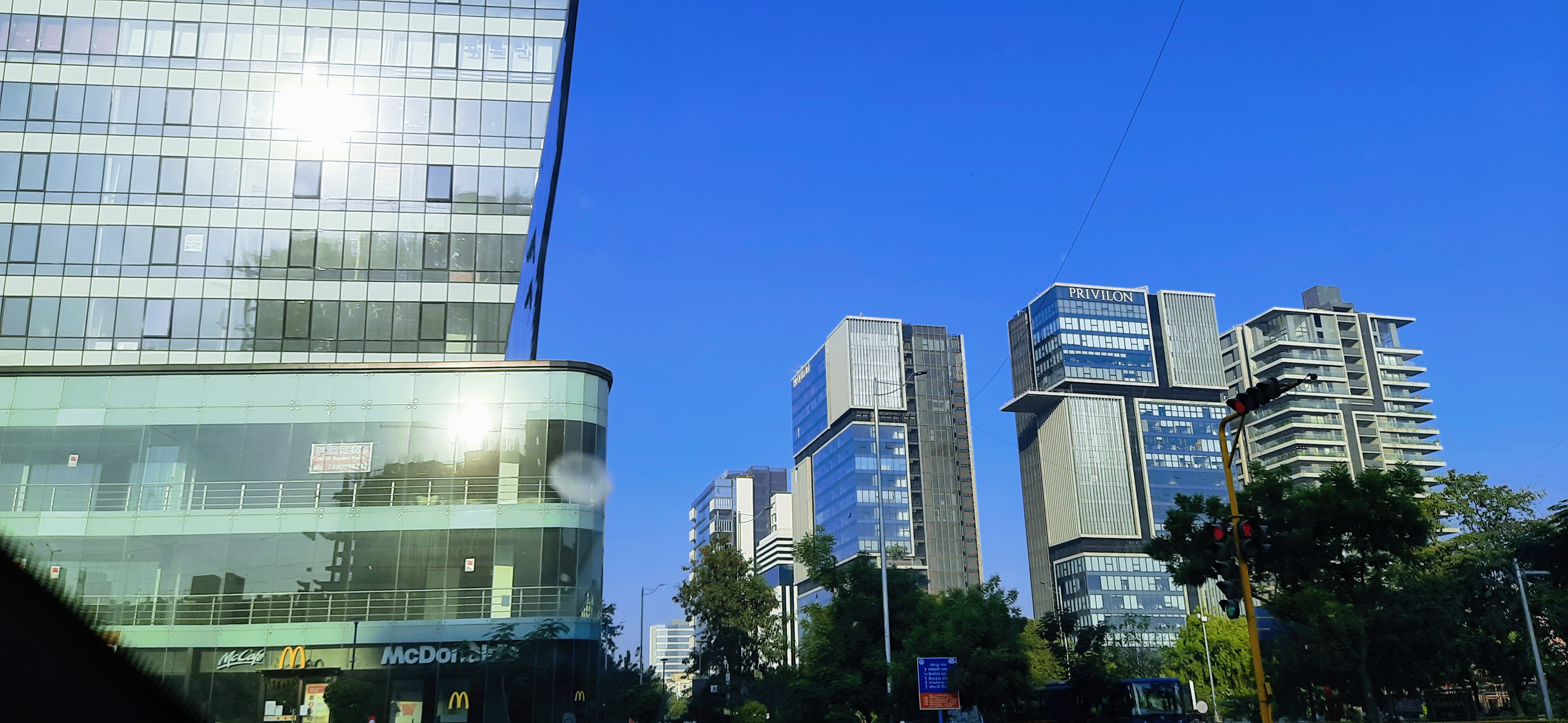
Ahmedabad

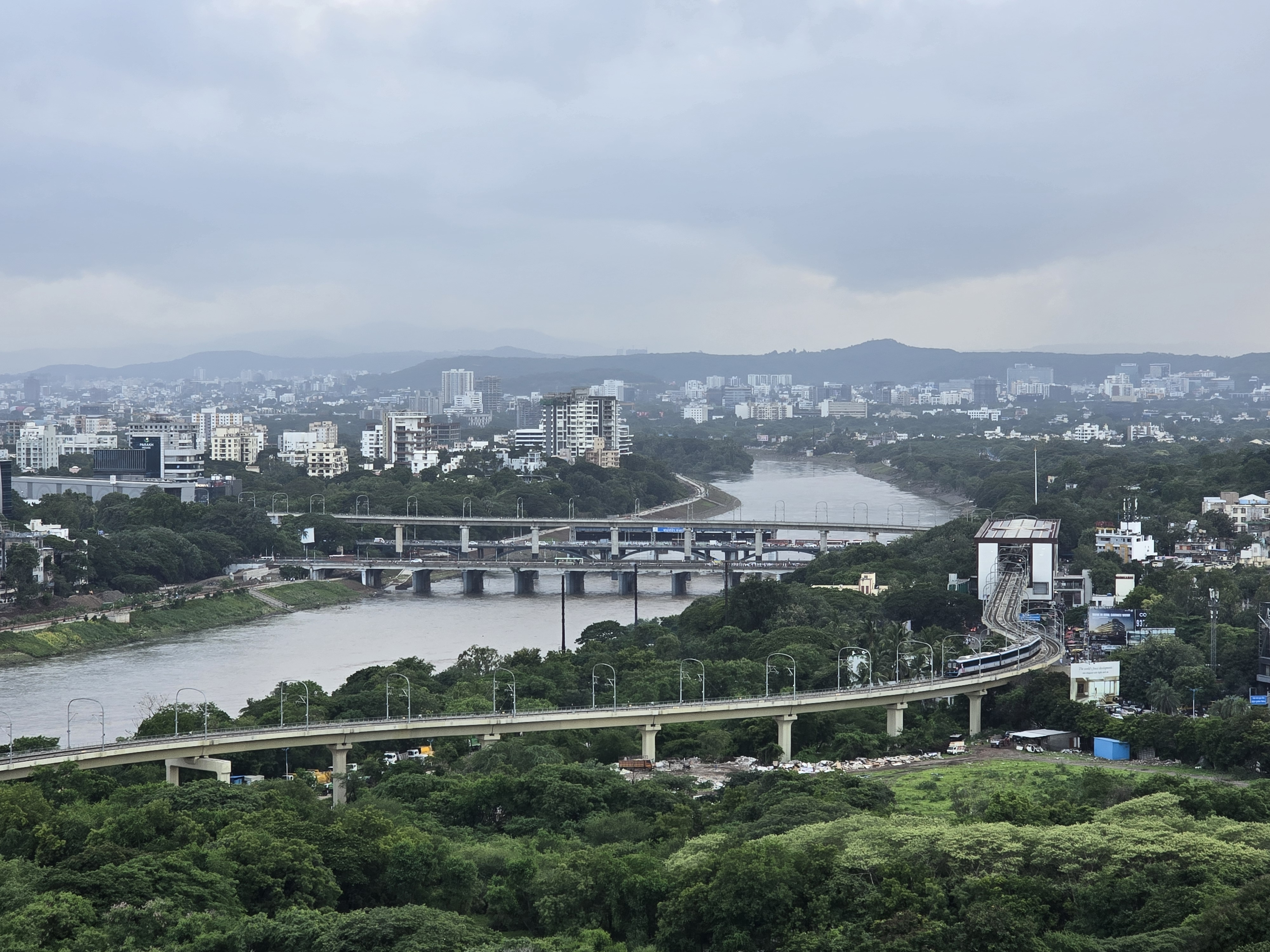
Pune

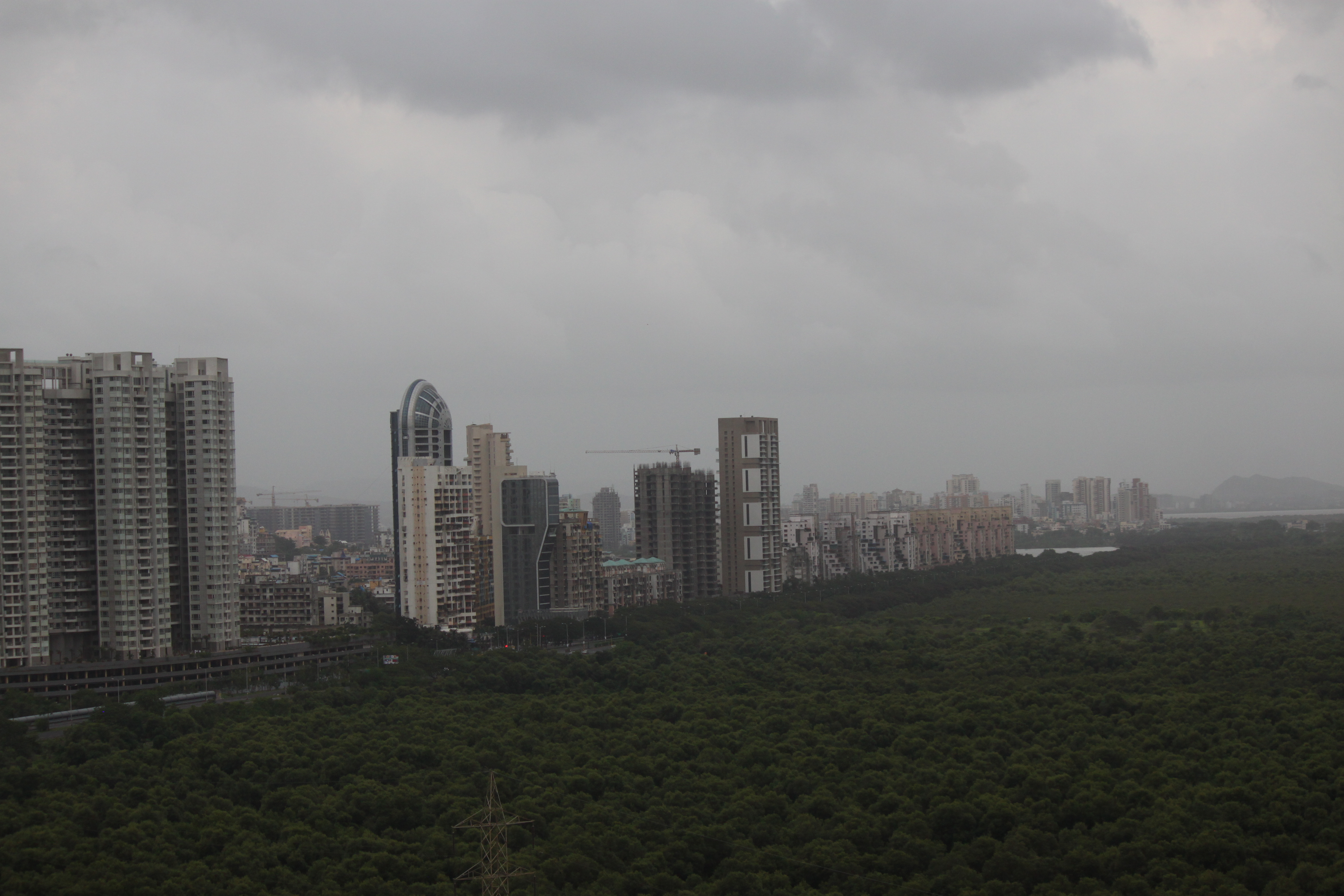
Navi Mumbai

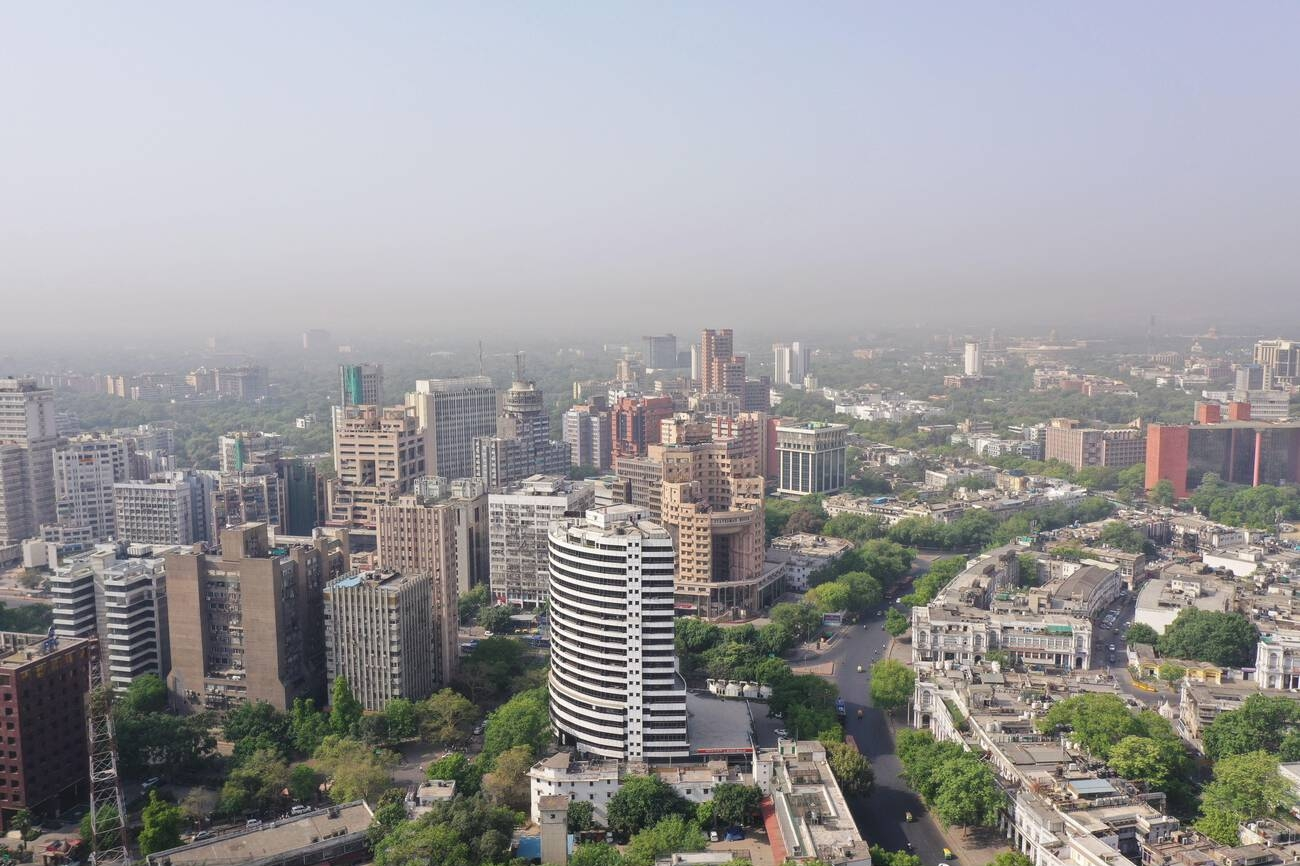
New Delhi

GIFT City

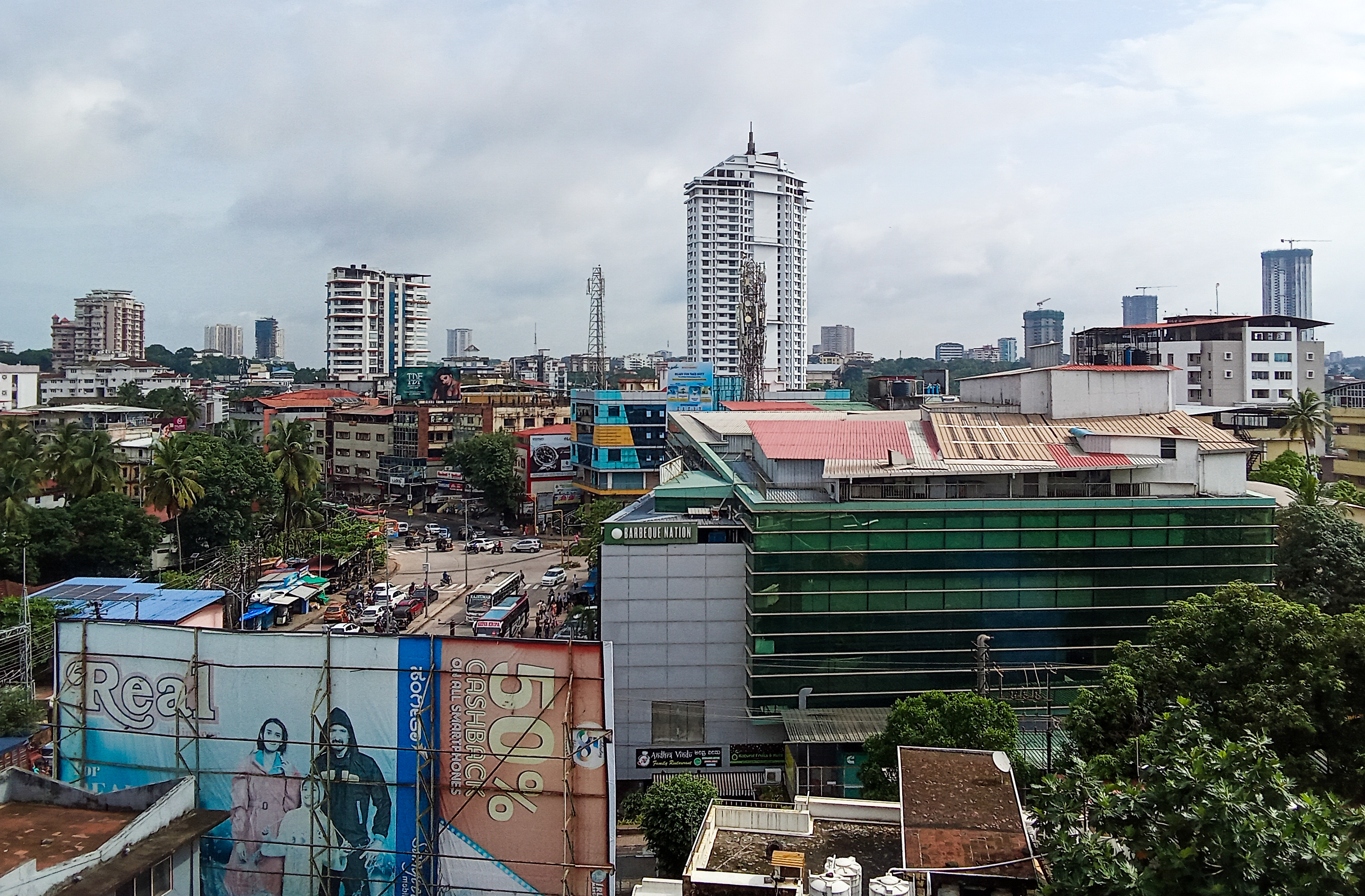
Mangaluru

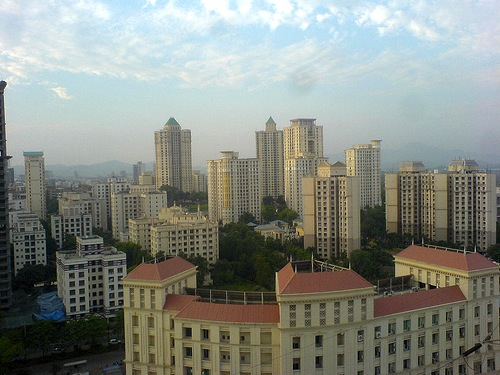
Thane

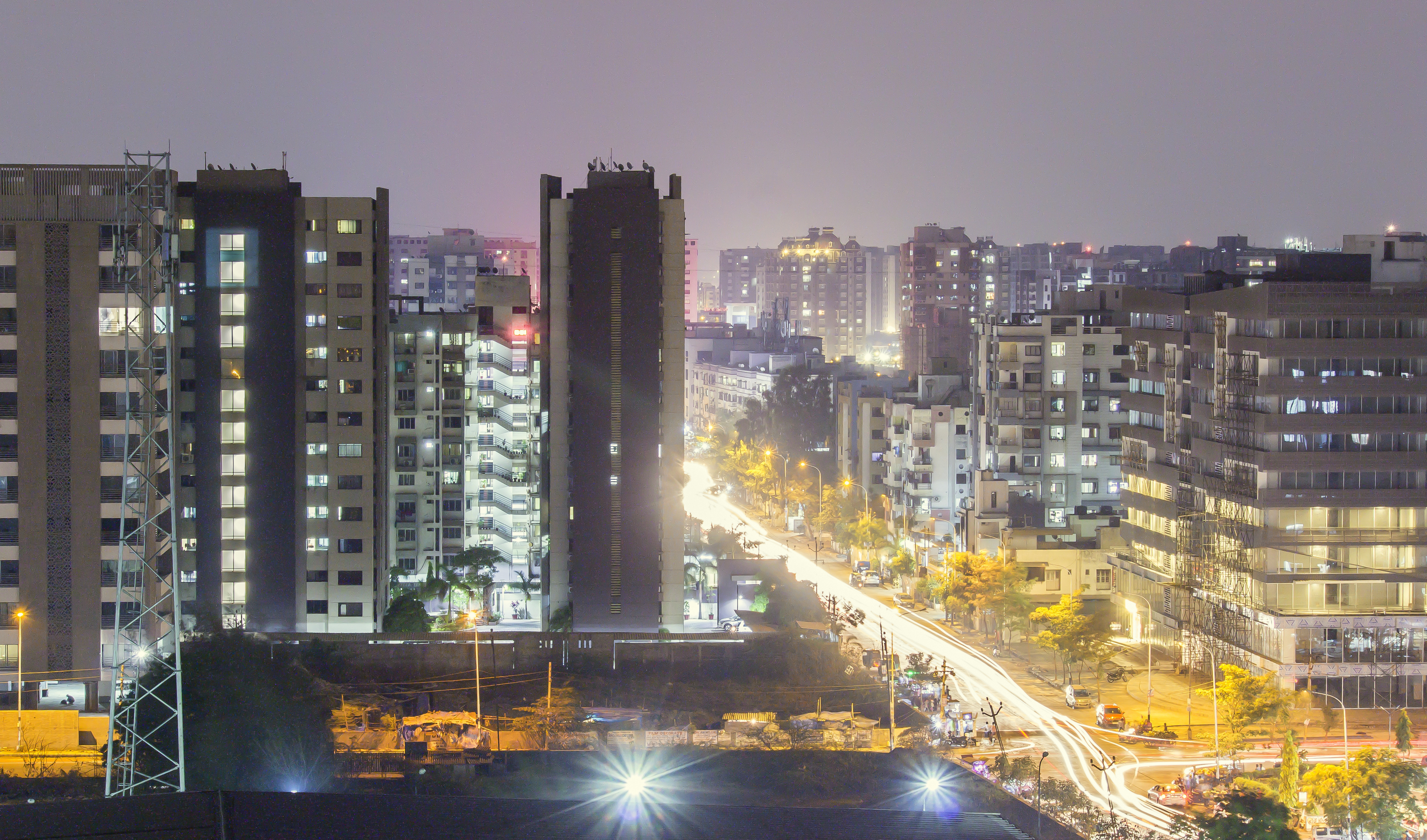
Surat

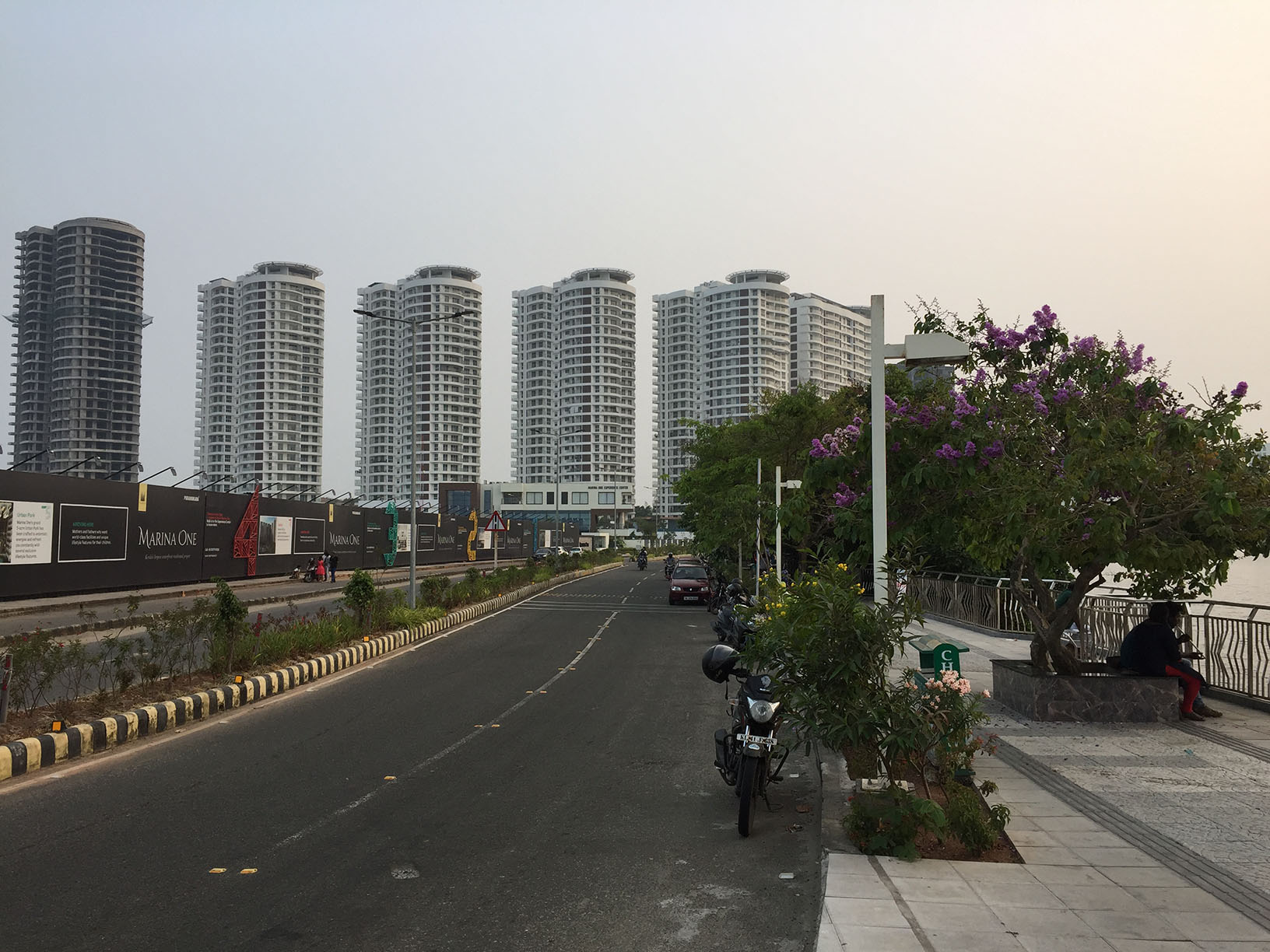
Kochi

This list of tallest buildings in different cities in India enumerates the tallest buildings of every big city in India based on official height. This includes spires and architectural details but does not include antenna masts. There are currently more than 400 skyscrapers in India and most of them are in Mumbai, Hyderabad, New Delhi (with the NCR; Noida and Gurgaon) and Kolkata. The era of skyscrapers in India began with the completion of the LIC Building in Chennai in 1959. With 12 floors initially, it was the first high-rise building in the country. As of May 2026, Ocean Towers 1 & 2, located in Mumbai is the tallest under construction skyscraper in the country, with a height of 331 metres (1,050 ft) with 75 floors. Lokhandwala Minerva — also located in Mumbai — is the tallest completed building in the country, with a height of 301 metres (988 ft) with 78 floors.

== Lists ==
- List of tallest buildings in Ahmedabad
- List of tallest buildings in Bengaluru
- List of tallest buildings in Chennai
- List of tallest buildings in Delhi-NCR
- List of tallest buildings in Gurgaon
- List of tallest buildings in Hyderabad
- List of tallest buildings in Kochi
- List of tallest buildings in Kolkata
- List of tallest buildings in Mangaluru
- List of tallest buildings in Mumbai
- List of tallest buildings in Navi Mumbai
- List of tallest buildings in Pune
- List of tallest buildings in Thane
