= List of tallest buildings in Mumbai =

Tallest buildings in Mumbai, India

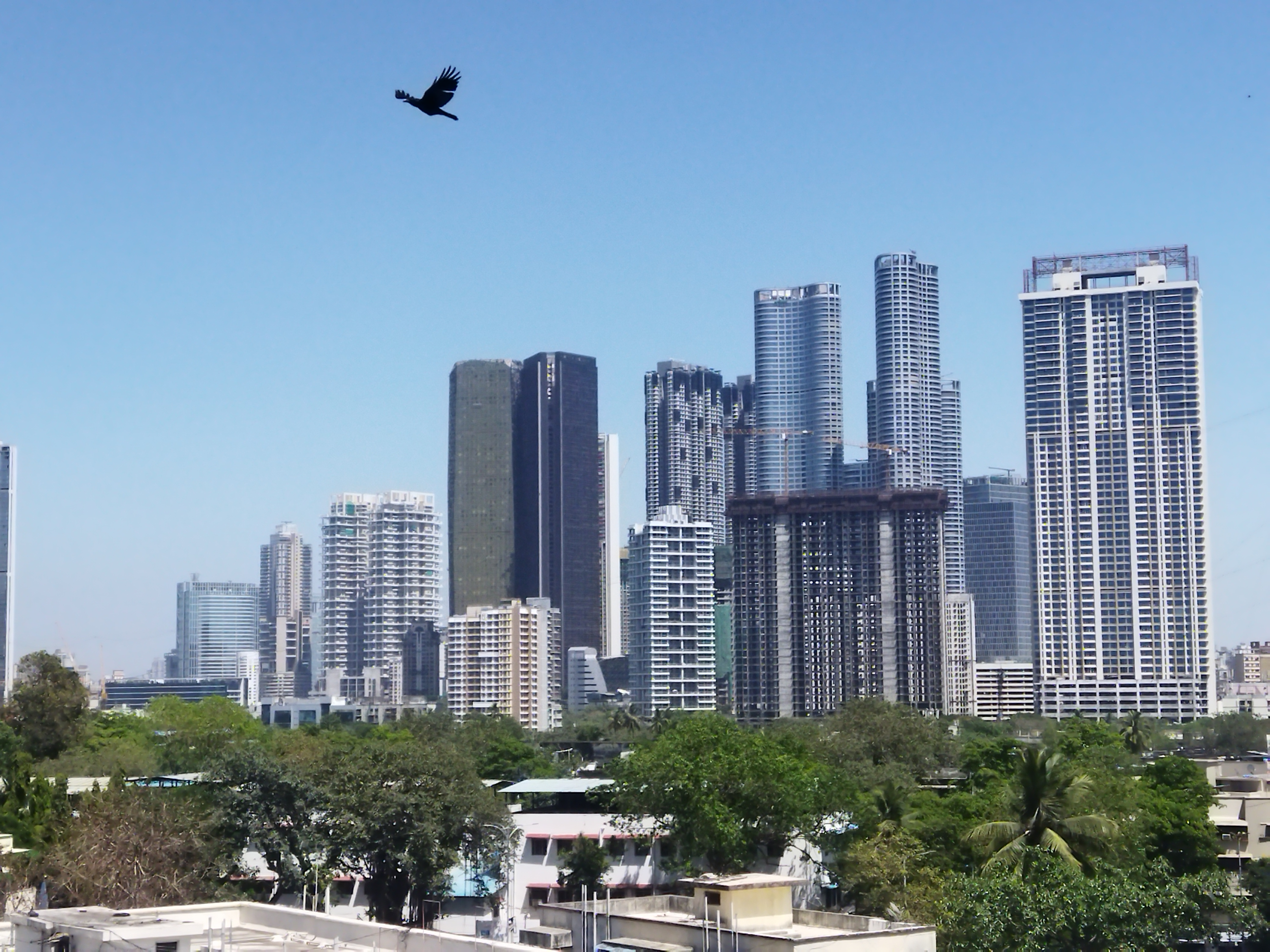
The skyline of Lower Parel

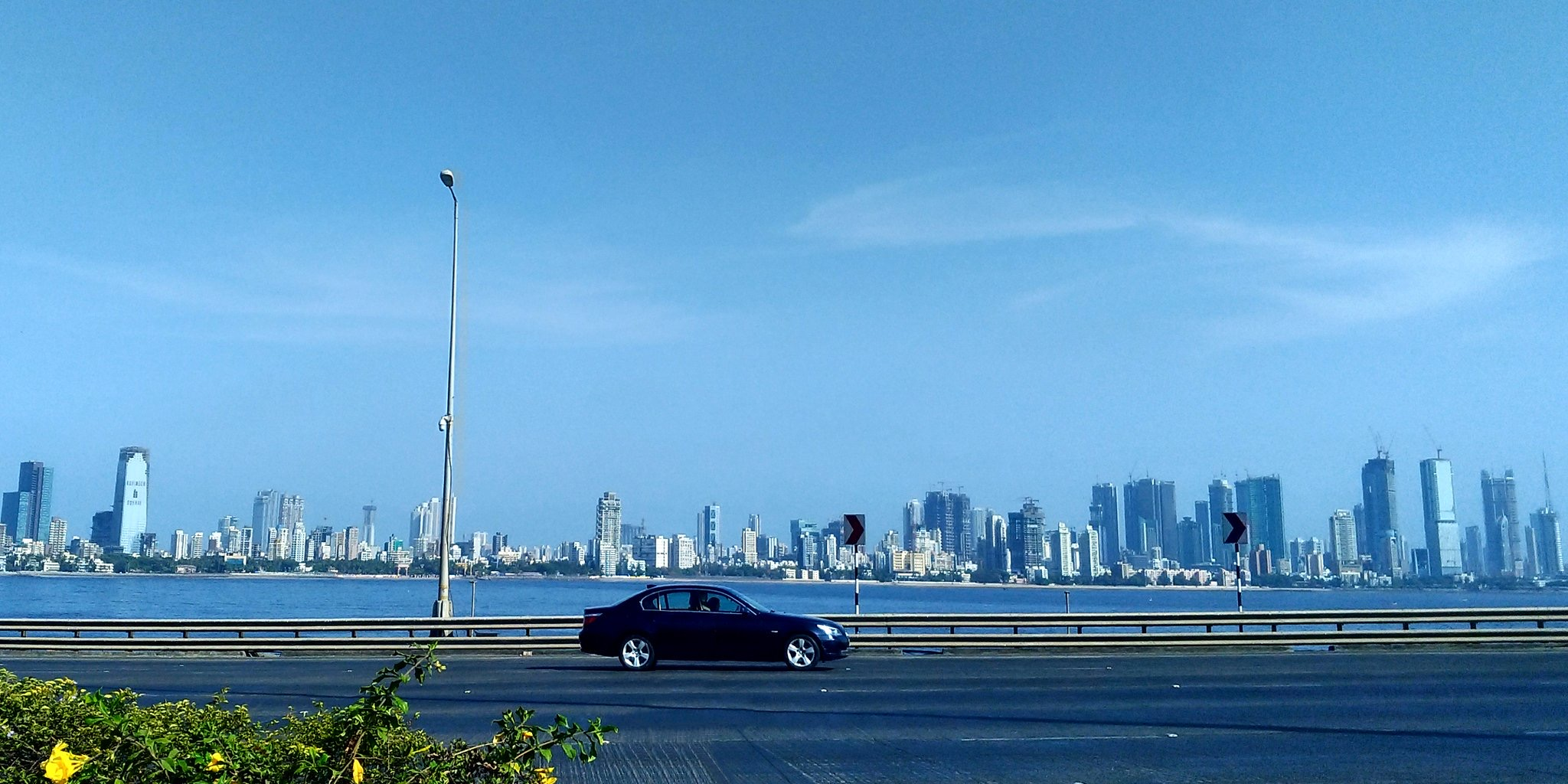
The skyline of Worli and Dadar as viewed from Bandra

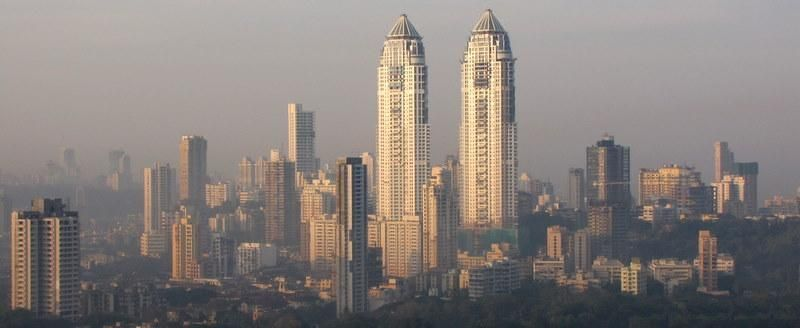
The skyline of Tardeo

Mumbai, the commercial and financial capital of India, has the highest number of skyscrapers and high-rise buildings in India. As of January 2026, there are 245 topped out or completed skyscrapers taller than 150 metres (492 ft), 87 completed or topped-out skyscrapers taller than 200 metres (656 ft) and over 4,000 high-rise buildings have already been constructed in the city of Mumbai. (A skyscraper is defined as a continuously habitable high-rise building that has over 40 floors and is taller than approximately 150 metres (492 ft) according to international standards.)

The first skyscrapers in Mumbai were constructed during the 1970s, when Usha Kiran and Matru Mandir were developed and stood at about 76 metres (250 feet), or 25 floors, each. After a significant lull, construction projects since the mid-1990s began taking the skyline upwards, with a major acceleration in the pace of development since 2000, when the Lower Parel area began developing. The tallest completed building in Mumbai is Lokhandwala Minerva, making it India's first completed supertall skyscraper.

As of February 2026, Mumbai has the fifth most skyscrapers in the world, behind Hong Kong, Shenzhen, New York City, and Dubai.

== Tallest buildings ==
This list ranks the tallest completed and topped out buildings in Mumbai that stand at least 150 m (492 ft) as of July 2025. This includes spires and architectural details but does not include antenna masts.

Was the tallest building in Mumbai upon completion.
Topped out but not yet completed

Rank	Name	Location	Image	Height m (ft)	Floors	Year	Purpose	Notes
1	Lokhandwala Minerva	Mahalaxmi 18°59′16″N 72°49′40″E		301 (988)	78	2022	Residential	Tallest completed building in Mumbai as of 2025
2	Palais Royale	Worli 18°59′58″N 72°49′14″E		297.50 (976)	84	2026	Residential	
3	Piramal Aranya Arav	Byculla 18°58′37″N 72°50′27″E		282.2 (926)	83	2022	Residential	
4	World One	Lower Parel 19°00′11″N 72°49′35″E		280.2 (919)	76	2020	Residential	
5	Piramal Mahalaxami North Tower	Mahalaxmi 18°59′02″N 72°49′36″E	–	279 metres (915 ft)	78	2026	Residential	
6	World View	Lower Parel 19°00′10″N 72°49′37″E		277.6 (911)	73	2020	Residential	
7	Wadhwa 25 South A	Elphinstone 19°01′07″N 72°49′47″E	–	270 (886)	65	2024	Residential	Partial Approvals filed till 206m for Wing A. Project was executed with both wings at 270m and 65 stories
8	Wadhwa 25 South B	Elphinstone 19°01′09″N 72°49′48″E	–	270 (886)	65	2026	Residential	Partial Approvals filed till 206m for Wing A. Project was executed with both wings at 270m and 65 stories. Topped out and structurally completed, handover expected in 2025 or 2026.
9	Lodha Park Adrina	Lower Parel 19°00′20″N 72°49′49″E	–	268 (879)	78	2025	Residential	Topped out and structurally completed, handover expected in 2025
10	Lodha Park Kiara	Lower Parel 19°00′20″N 72°49′51″E		267 (876) (Note: This height is an estimate from the CTBUH.)	78	2022	Residential	
11	Omkar 1973 Tower A	Worli 19°00′32″N 72°49′26″E		267 (876)	73	2020	Residential	
12	Omkar 1973 Tower B	Worli 19°00′35″N 72°49′25″E		267 (876)	73	2020	Residential	
13	Lodha Allura	Lower Parel 19°00′15″N 72°49′45″E		266.3 (874)	81	2021	Residential	
14	Lodha Parkside	Lower Parel 19°00′13″N 72°49′48″E		266.3 (874)	81	2021	Residential	
15	Trump Tower Mumbai	Lower Parel 19°00′20″N 72°49′45″E		266.3 (874)	79	2021	Residential	
16	Lodha Marquise	Lower Parel 19°00′22″N 72°49′45″E		264 (866)	77	2021	Residential	
17	Nathani Heights	Mumbai Central 18°58′07″N 72°49′11″E		261.6 (858)	72	2020	Residential	
18	Three Sixty West Tower B	Worli 19°00′43″N 72°49′23″E		260 (850)	66	2020	Office	
19	Rustomjee Crown Tower A	Elphinstone 19°00′37″N 72°49′52″E		260 (850)	69	2023	Residential	
20	Rustomjee Crown Tower B	Elphinstone 19°00′40″N 72°49′50″E		260 (850)	69	2023	Residential	
21	Rustomjee Crown Tower C	Elphinstone 19°00′43″N 72°49′53″E	–	260 (853)	69	2026	Residential	Topped out and structurally completed, handover expected in December 2025
22	One Avighna Park	Parel 18°59′42″N 72°50′05″E		260 (853)	64	2017	Residential	
23	Imperial Tower 2	Tardeo 18°58′18″N 72°48′47″E		256 (840)	60	2010	Residential	
24	Imperial Tower 1	Tardeo 18°58′15″N 72°48′47″E		256 (840)	60	2010	Residential	
25	Birla Niyaara T1	Worli 19.006682°N 72.826244°E		256 (840)	75	2026	Residential	Structurally Topped Out. Premium residential tower developed by Birla Estates.
26	Oberoi Three Sixty West Tower A	Worli 19°00′44″N 72°49′23″E		255.6 (839)	52	2020	Hotel	
27	Four Seasons Private Residences & Apartment Tower 1	Worli 18°59′45″N 72°49′16″E		250 (820)	55	2021	Residential	
28	Ahuja Tower	Elphinstone 19°00′44″N 72°49′32″E		250 (820)	54	2015	Residential	
29	Monte South T1	Byculla 18.974072°N 72.829922°E	–	242 (794)	68	2026	Residential	Structurally Topped Out
30	Monte South T2	Byculla 18.974799°N 72.830043°E	–	242 (794)	68	2026	Residential	Same specifications and Monte South T1. Structurally Topped Out. CTBUH yet to update
31	Simana Bhoomi Tower 2	Lalbaug 18°59′22″N 72°50′25″E	–	240 (787)	57	2026	Residential	Topped out and structurally completed, handover expected in 2025. 57 floors were constructed hence the increase in height than in document
32	L&T Crescent Bay T 6	Sewri 19°00′15″N 72°51′01″E	–	238.9 (784)	59	2019	Residential	
33	Salsette 27 Tower 1	Byculla 18°58′56″N 72°50′11″E		235 (771)	65	2023	Residential	
34	Salsette 27 Tower 2	Byculla 18°58′58″N 72°50′08″E		235 (771)	65	2023	Residential	
35	Auris Serenity 1	Malad 19°11′34″N 72°50′08″E		235 (771)	69	2019	Residential	
36	Auris Serenity 2	Malad 19°11′31″N 72°50′09″E		235 (771)	69	2019	Residential	
37	Auris Serenity 3	Malad 19°11′29″N 72°50′11″E		235 (771)	69	2021	Residential	
38	Auris Bliss	Malad 19°11′35″N 72°50′13″E	–	235 (771)	69	2022	Residential	
39	N Rose Northern Hills A	Dahisar 19°14′54″N 72°51′50″E		231.35 (759)	68	2026	Residential	
40	N Rose Northern Hills B	Dahisar 19°14′53″N 72°51′52″E		231.35 (759)	68	2026	Residential	
41	Oberoi Commerz 3	Goregaon 19°10′16″N 72°51′38″E		225.4 (740)	51	2023	Office	
42	Celestia Spaces Wing A	Sewri 18°59′37″N 72°50′52″E	–	225 (738)	58	2020	Residential	
43	Celestia Spaces Wing B	Sewri 18°59′38″N 72°50′54″E	–	225 (738)	58	2020	Residential	
44	Raheja Altimus	Worli 19°00′22″N 72°49′17″E	–	225 (738)	46	2022	Office	
45	Island City Centre 1	Wadala 19°00′39″N 72°51′03″E		223 (732)	65	2019	Residential	
46	World Crest	Lower Parel 19°00′09″N 72°49′40″E		223 (732)	57	2017	Residential	
47	Crescent Bay Tower 5	Sewri 19°00′15″N 72°51′03″E	–	222.5 (730)	61	2019	Residential	
48	Lodha Bellissimo A & B	Mahalaxmi 18°59′15″N 72°49′44″E		222 (728)	53	2010	Residential	
49	Lodha Bellissimo C	Mahalaxmi 18°59′18″N 72°49′44″E		222 (728)		2012	Residential	
50	Indiabulls Sky Blu Tower A	Worli 18°59′50″N 72°49′13″E		220 (722)	56	2018	Mixed-use	
51	Oberoi Sky City Tower A	Borivali 19°13′20″N 72°51′53″E		220 (722)	67	2020	Residential	
52	Oberoi Sky City Tower B	Borivali 19°13′21″N 72°51′51″E		220 (722)	67	2020	Residential	
53	Oberoi Sky City Tower C	Borivali 19°13′19″N 72°51′49″E		220 (722)	67	2020	Residential	
54	Oberoi Sky City Tower D	Borivali 19°13′20″N 72°51′47″E		220 (722)	67	2020	Residential	
55	Oberoi Sky City Tower E	Borivali 19°13′19″N 72°51′45″E		220 (722)	67	2020	Residential	
56	Sky Forest 1	Lower Parel 19°00′29″N 72°50′00″E	–	220 (722)	52	2021	Residential	
57	Sky Forest 2	Lower Parel 19°00′30″N 72°50′01″E	–	220 (722)	52	2021	Residential	
58	Omkar Alta Monte Tower B	Malad 19°11′03″N 72°51′41″E	–	218 (715)	65	2016	Residential	
59	Lodha Venezia Tower A	Parel 18°59′30″N 72°50′29″E	–	217 (712)	68	2017	Residential	
60	Lodha Venezia Tower B	Parel 18°59′30″N 72°50′25″E	–	217 (712)	68	2021	Residential	
61	Piramal Mahalaxami Central Tower	Mahalaxmi 18°58′59″N 72°49′36″E	–	215.76 (708)	60	2025	Residential	
62	Raheja Imperia	Lower Parel 19°00′06″N 72°49′27″E	–	214 (702)	52	2022	Residential	
63	Piramal Mahalaxami South Tower	Mahalaxmi 18°58′57″N 72°49′38″E	–	213.4 (700)	59	2025	Residential	
64	Piramal Aranya Avyan	Byculla 18°58′41″N 72°50′27″E	–	212 (696)	56	2024	Residential	
65	Imperial Edge	Tardeo 18°58′20″N 72°48′51″E	–	210 (689)	50	2020	Residential	
66	L&T Rejuve 360 T1	Mulund 19.166880°N 72.940517°E	–	210 (689) (est.)	70	2026	Residential	Structurally topped out and possession expected in December 2025. Tallest Tower in Mulund. Height estimated at 210m due to floor count as architectural drawing is unavailable
67	Raheja Artesia	Worli 19°00′29″N 72°49′20″E	–	210 (689)	58	2019	Residential	
68	Oberoi Eternia A	Mulund 19°10′16″N 72°56′23″E	–	207 (679)	60	2022	Residential	All towers share same specifications. Towers 2,3 and 4 cannot be found on Emporis
69	Oberoi Eternia B	Mulund 19°10′17″N 72°56′20″E	–	207 (679)	60	2022	Residential	All towers share same specifications. Towers 2,3 and 4 cannot be found on Emporis
70	Oberoi Eternia C	Mulund 19°10′20″N 72°56′18″E	–	207 (679)	60	2022	Residential	All towers share same specifications. Towers 2,3 and 4 cannot be found on Emporis
71	Oberoi Eternia D	Mulund 19°10′21″N 72°56′16″E	–	207 (679)	60	2022	Residential	All towers share same specifications. Towers 2,3 and 4 cannot be found on Emporis
72	Oberoi Enigma A	Mulund 19°10′26″N 72°56′25″E	–	207 (679)	60	2022	Residential	
73	Oberoi Enigma B	Mulund 19°10′29″N 72°56′21″E	–	207 (679)	60	2022	Residential	
74	Crescent Bay Tower 4	Sewri 19°00′16″N 72°51′03″E	–	206.5 (677)	56	2019	Residential	
75	SD Epsilon Tower A	Kandivali 19°12′17″N 72°52′21″E	–	205 (673)	69	2022	Residential	Taller than SD Alpine. RERA Document cannot be found
76	SD Epsilon Tower B	Kandivali 19°12′15″N 72°52′20″E	–	205 (673)	69	2022	Residential	Taller than SD Alpine. RERA Document cannot be found
77	SD Sienna	Kandivali 19.206651°N 72.872546°E	–	205 (673) (est.)	67	2026	Residential	Structurally Topped Out with Possession in December 2025 or early 2026. RERA Height document could not be found. Taller than SD Alpine and around the height of SD Epsilon
78	Kohinoor Square	Dadar 19°01′30″N 72°50′30″E		201.9 (662)	49	2013	Office	
79	Kalpataru Avana	Parel 18°59′56″N 72°50′32″E		201 (659)	52	2022	Residential	
80	Raheja Modern Vivarea T1	Mahalakshmi 18.979932°N 72.823783°E	-	200.67 (658)	44	2028	Residential	Structurally Topped Out
81	Raheja Modern Vivarea T2	Mahalakshmi 18.979287°N 72.823493°E	-	200.67 (658)	44	2028	Residential	Structurally Topped Out
82	Crescent Bay Tower 3	Sewri 19°00′15″N 72°51′01″E	–	200.1 (656)	54	2022	Residential	
83	Simana Bhoomi Tower 1	Lalbaug 18°59′22″N 72°50′22″E	–	200 (656)	47	2026	Residential	Topped out and structurally completed, handover expected in 2025
84	Prestige City Siesta	Mulund 19°11′03″N 72°56′31″E	–	200 (656)+	55	2025	Residential	Height listed as approx 200m since RERA documents are illegible and nothing can be determined as they are bad quality. Tower is 55 stories tall and is likely to reach the 200m mark. Floor to ceiling heights of 11ft mentioned in citations
85	Prestige Bellanza T1	Mulund 19.184074°N 72.940572°E	–	200 (656)+	55	2026	Residential	Same Specifications as Prestige Siesta but a different phase
86	Prestige Bellanza T2	Mulund 19.185285°N 72.941497°E	–	200 (656)+	55	2026	Residential	Same Specifications as Prestige Siesta but a different phase
87	Island City Centre 2	Wadala 19°00′41″N 72°51′00″E		197.6 (648)	59	2019	Residential	
88	Omkar Alta Monte Tower C	Malad 19°11′00″N 72°51′42″E	–	197 (646)	58	2017	Residential	
89	Effiel Tower	Mazgaon 18°58′09″N 72°50′22″E	–	197 (646)	54	2021	Office	
90	Neelam Senroofs Senon	Mulund 19.157795°N 72.949710°E	–	197 (646)	56	2026	Residential	Structurally topped out.
91	SD Alpine A	Kandivali 19°12′19″N 72°52′21″E		196.5 (645)	62	2019	Residential	
92	SD Alpine B	Kandivali 19°12′21″N 72°52′20″E		196.5 (645)	62	2019	Residential	
93	Indiabulls Sky	Lower Parel 19°00′32″N 72°50′02″E		196 (643)	48	2016	Residential	
94	Lodha Altamount	Altamount Road 18°58′06″N 72°48′38″E		195 (640)	43	2018	Residential	
95	Iora	Tardeo 18°57′55″N 72°48′48″E	–	195 (640)	50	2022	Residential	
96	Raheja Vivarea A	Mahalaxmi 18°58′49″N 72°49′36″E		193.8 (636)	45	2012	Residential	
97	Raheja Vivarea B	Mahalaxmi 18°58′47″N 72°49′35″E		193.8 (636)	45	2012	Residential	
98	Raheja Vivarea C	Mahalaxmi 18°58′45″N 72°49′33″E		193.8 (636)	45	2012	Residential	
99	Raheja Vivarea D	Mahalaxmi 18°58′42″N 72°49′31″E		193.8 (636)	45	2018	Residential	
100	Raheja Vivarea E	Mahalaxmi 18°58′38″N 72°49′34″E		193.8 (636)	45	2018	Residential	
101	Ashok Towers D	Parel 18°59′51″N 72°50′23″E		193 (633)	49	2010	Residential	
102	Piramal Aranya Ahan	Byculla 18°58′44″N 72°50′27″E	–	192.9 (633)	52	2022	Residential	
103	Indiabulls Vista Blu Tower B	Worli 18°59′51″N 72°49′16″E		191 (627)	51	2018	Mixed-use	
104	Ruby Mills Tower	Dadar 19°01′27″N 72°50′42″E		191 (627)	40	2013	Office	
105	Anchor Victorian	Parel 19°00′10″N 72°50′23″E	–	190 (623)	50	2018	Residential	Skyscraperpage lists 175m but 2 more floors + roof structures were built
106	Orchid Enclave 1	Mumbai Central 18°58′04″N 72°49′25″E		190 (623)	55	2013	Residential	
107	Orchid Enclave 2	Mumbai Central 18°58′03″N 72°49′27″E		190 (623)	55	2013	Residential	
108	Orchid Woods 1	Malad 19°10′20″N 72°52′13″E		190 (623)	55	2013	Residential	
109	Orchid Woods 2	Malad 19°10′16″N 72°52′12″E		190 (623)	55	2013	Residential	
110	Orchid Woods 3	Malad 19°10′16″N 72°52′14″E		190 (623)	55	2013	Residential	
111	Oberoi Esquire Tower 1	Goregaon 19°10′19″N 72°51′48″E	–	190 (623)	57	2018	Residential	
112	Oberoi Esquire Tower 2	Goregaon 19°10′19″N 72°51′51″E	–	190 (623)	57	2018	Residential	
113	Oberoi Esquire Tower 3	Goregaon 19°10′18″N 72°51′52″E	–	190 (623)	57	2018	Residential	
114	Siddha Seabrook A (2 Tower Complex)	Kandivali 19°12′17″N 72°50′06″E	–	190 (623)	57	2023	Residential	Building is estimated to be 190m since no architectural drawings were found but 57 floors were sanctioned. The estimation was reached by comparing the tower to other similar projects
115	Siddha Seabrook B (2 Tower Complex)	Kandivali 19°12′16″N 72°50′06″E	–	190 (623)	57	2023	Residential	Building is estimated to be 190m since no architectural drawings were found but 57 floors were sanctioned. The estimation was reached by comparing the tower to other similar projects.
116	Wadhwa W 54	Matunga 19°01′34″N 72°50′38″E	–	190 (623)	44	2017	Residential	
117	Shantiniketan A	Matunga 19.025923°N 72.854029°E	–	189 (620)	53	2026	Residential	Structurally Topped Out
118	Shantiniketan B	Matunga 19.025628°N 72.853877°E	–	189 (620)	49	2026	Residential	Structurally Topped Out
119	Sheth Irene	Malad 19°11′09″N 72°50′16″E	–	188 (617)	58	2022	Residential	Height confirmed in RERA documents
120	Crescent Bay Tower 2	Sewri 19°00′16″N 72°51′00″E	–	187.3 (615)	50	2019	Residential	
121	Avighna 9	Parel 18°59′41″N 72°50′11″E	–	187 (614)	45	2020	Residential	
122	Sheth Beaumonte wing A	Sion 19°02′28″N 72°51′54″E	–	187 (614)	51	2019	Residential	
123	Sheth Beaumonte wing B	Sion 19°02′29″N 72°51′53″E	–	187 (614)	51	2022	Residential	
124	Aquaria Grande Tower A	Borivali 19°14′24″N 72°50′54″E	–	182 (597)	46	2018	Residential	
125	Urmi Estate	Lower Parel 18°59′52″N 72°49′44″E	–	182 (597)	45	2014	Office	
126	Lodha Bellevue T1	Mahalakshmi 18.977122°N 72.827988°E	-	181.4 (595)	57	2026	Residential	Structurally Topped Out
127	Planet Godrej	Mahalaxmi 18°58′52″N 72°49′50″E		181 (594)	51	2009	Residential	
128	Crescent Bay Tower 1	Sewri 19°00′16″N 72°50′59″E	–	180.9 (594)	49	2019	Residential	
129	Prestige Jasdan Classic Tower A	Byculla 18°58′56″N 72°49′53″E		180.4 (592)	47	2025	Residential	
130	Prestige Jasdan Classic Tower B	Byculla 18°58′56″N 72°49′49″E		180.4 (592)	47	2025	Residential	
131	Omkar Alta Monte Tower A	Malad 19°11′04″N 72°51′43″E	–	180 (591)	53	2016	Residential	
132	Sunshine Tower	Dadar 19°00′41″N 72°50′17″E		180 (591)	40	2011	Office	
133	One Lodha Place	Lower Parel 19°00′07″N 72°49′42″E	–	180 (591)	38	2022	Office	
134	Runwal Nirvana	Parel 19°00′13″N 72°50′52″E	–	180 (591)	55	2023	Residential	Height could not be found in documents but 55 floors were built. Height has been estimated by comparing it to other similar projects
135	Runwal Bliss T 1	Kanjurmarg 19°08′03″N 72°56′07″E	–	180 (591)	53	2021	Residential	Height confirmed in RERA documents. All towers share the same specifications
136	Runwal Bliss T 2	Kanjurmarg 19°08′02″N 72°56′08″E	–	180 (591)	53	2021	Residential	Height confirmed in RERA documents. All towers share the same specifications
137	Runwal Bliss T 3	Kanjurmarg 19°08′01″N 72°56′10″E	–	180 (591)	53	2021	Residential	Height confirmed in RERA documents. All towers share the same specifications
138	Runwal Bliss T 4	Kanjurmarg 19°07′59″N 72°56′09″E	–	180 (591)	53	2021	Residential	Height confirmed in RERA documents. All towers share the same specifications
139	Runwal Bliss T 5	Kanjurmarg 19°07′58″N 72°56′07″E	–	180 (591)	53	2021	Residential	Height confirmed in RERA documents. All towers share the same specifications
140	Continental Heights C	Byculla 18°58′43″N 72°50′32″E	–	179.55 (589)	56	2023	Office	Height confirmed in RERA documents. 170m + 9m Overhead Structure
141	Lodha Primero	Parel 18°59′15″N 72°49′47″E		179 (587)	53	2014	Residential	
142	Runwal Forests T8	Kanjurmarg 19°08′14″N 72°55′58″E	–	178.01 (584)	51	2019	Residential	
143	Runwal Forests T9	Kanjurmarg 19°08′13″N 72°55′57″E	–	178.01 (584)	51	2019	Residential	
144	Sarvodaya Heights	Mulund 19°09′53″N 72°56′41″E	–	178 (584)	52	2012	Residential	
145	Runwal Forests T10	Kanjurmarg 19°08′11″N 72°55′55″E	–	176.70 (580)	56	2026	Residential	
146	Runwal Forests T11	Kanjurmarg 19°08′09″N 72°55′54″E	–	176.70 (580)	56	2026	Residential	
147	Baya Upper Nest Tower A	Mulund 19°10′12″N 72°57′31″E	–	175 (574) (est.)	60	2023	Residential	Height has been estimated as 175m since RERA documents could not be found. A total of 60 floors were sanctioned. Project height has been estimated by comparing it to other similar projects
148	Lokhandwala Victoria	Worli 18°59′54″N 72°49′12″E	–	175 (574)	45	2016	Residential	
149	Antilia	Altamount Road 18°58′05″N 72°48′34″E		174 (571)	27	2010	Residential	
150	Ashford Royale 1	Mulund 19°09′27″N 72°56′43″E	–	173 (568)	42	2017	Residential	
151	Ashford Royale 2	Mulund 19°09′27″N 72°56′41″E	–	173 (568)	42	2017	Residential	
152	Ashford Royale 3	Mulund 19°09′28″N 72°56′40″E	–	173 (568)	42	2019	Residential	
153	Ashford Royale 4	Mulund 19°09′30″N 72°56′40″E	–	173 (568)	42	2019	Residential	
154	Indiabulls Iris Blu Tower C	Worli 18°59′52″N 72°49′11″E		172 (564)	47	2018	Mixed-use	
155	Wadhwa Atmosphere 02 Wing A	Mulund 19°09′29″N 72°56′51″E	–	172 (564)	43	2023	Residential	All towers share the same specifications as tower 1 in the citation as all the towers share the same specifications but could not be found on emporis
156	Wadhwa Atmosphere 02 Wing B	Mulund 19°09′32″N 72°56′51″E	–	172 (564)	43	2023	Residential	All towers share the same specifications as tower 1 in the citation as all the towers share the same specifications but could not be found on emporis
157	Wadhwa Atmosphere 02 Wing C	Mulund 19°09′33″N 72°56′51″E	–	172 (564)	43	2023	Residential	All towers share the same specifications as tower 1 in the citation as all the towers share the same specifications but could not be found on emporis
158	Wadhwa Atmosphere 02 Wing D	Mulund 19°09′34″N 72°56′53″E	–	172 (564)	43	2023	Residential	All towers share the same specifications as tower 1 in the citation as all the towers share the same specifications but could not be found on emporis
159	Wadhwa Atmosphere 02 Wing E	Mulund 19°09′35″N 72°56′54″E	–	172 (564)	43	2023	Residential	All towers share the same specifications as tower 1 in the citation as all the towers share the same specifications but could not be found on emporis
160	Wadhwa Atmosphere 02 Wing F	Mulund 19°09′36″N 72°56′55″E	–	172 (564)	43	2023	Residential	All towers share the same specifications as tower 1 in the citation as all the towers share the same specifications but could not be found on emporis
161	Lodha Fiorenza 1	Goregaon 19°09′16″N 72°51′23″E	–	172 (564)	47	2015	Residential	All towers share the same specifications as the RERA for Tower D. Five additional floors were constructed
162	Lodha Fiorenza 2	Goregaon 19°09′16″N 72°51′21″E	–	172 (564)	47	2016	Residential	All towers share the same specifications as the RERA for Tower D. Five additional floors were constructed
163	Lodha Fiorenza 3	Goregaon 19°09′16″N 72°51′20″E	–	172 (564)	47	2015	Residential	All towers share the same specifications as the RERA for Tower D. Five additional floors were constructed
164	Lodha Fiorenza 4	Goregaon 19°09′15″N 72°51′20″E	–	172 (564)	47	2016	Residential	All towers share the same specifications as the RERA for Tower D. Five additional floors were constructed
165	Vasant Grandeur	Borivali 19°12′54″N 72°51′55″E	–	172 (564)	48	2010	Residential	
166	Dosti Eastern Bay A	Wadala 19°01′16″N 72°52′00″E	–	172 (564)	51	2023	Residential	All towers share the same specifications as the RERA cited
167	Dosti Eastern Bay B	Wadala 19°01′18″N 72°52′00″E	–	172 (564)	54	2023	Residential	All towers share the same specifications as the RERA cited
168	Dosti Eastern Bay C	Wadala 19°01′19″N 72°52′00″E	–	172 (564)	51	2023	Residential	All towers share the same specifications as the RERA cited
169	Dosti Eastern Bay D	Wadala 19°01′20″N 72°52′00″E	–	172 (564)	51	2023	Residential	All towers share the same specifications as the RERA cited
170	Dosti Eastern Bay E	Wadala 19°01′20″N 72°52′02″E	–	172 (564)	51	2023	Residential	All towers share the same specifications as the RERA cited
171	RA Residence 1	Dadar 19°00′54″N 72°50′48″E	–	170 (558)	50	2019	Residential	
172	RA Residence 2	Dadar 19°00′52″N 72°50′48″E	–	170 (558)	50	2019	Residential	
173	Oberoi Exquisite Tower 1	Goregaon 19°10′16″N 72°51′51″E	–	170 (558)	50	2014	Residential	
174	Oberoi Exquisite Tower 2	Goregaon 19°10′13″N 72°51′51″E	–	170 (558)	50	2014	Residential	
175	Oberoi Exquisite Tower 3	Goregaon 19°10′13″N 72°51′47″E	–	170 (558)	50	2014	Residential	
176	Marathon Futurex	Lower Parel 18°59′42″N 72°49′51″E		170 (558)	38	2017	Office	
177	Omkar Alta Monte Tower D	Malad 19°11′02″N 72°51′42″E	–	170 (558)	50	2021	Residential	
178	Ajmera Aeon	Wadala 19°01′32″N 72°52′42″E	–	168 (551)	50	2017	Residential	
179	Sunteck City Avenue 1 Tower 1	Goregaon 19°09′03″N 72°50′49″E	–	167.4 (549)	45	2017	Residential	
180	Sunteck City Avenue 1 Tower 2	Goregaon 19°09′03″N 72°50′50″E	–	167.4 (549)	45	2018	Residential	
181	Sunteck City Avenue 1 Tower 3	Goregaon 19°09′00″N 72°50′49″E	–	167.4 (549)	45	2021	Residential	
182	Aquaria Grande Tower B	Borivali 19°14′24″N 72°50′54″E	–	167 (548)	41	2013	Residential	
183	F Residences	Malad 19°11′26″N 72°51′41″E	–	167 (548)	44	2022	Residential	Height could not be found in documents. Height has been estimated as 167m by comparing it to similar projects. Included in the list since it is certainly 150m+
184	Sunteck City Avenue 4 Tower 1	Goregaon 19°08′46″N 72°50′55″E	–	167 (548)	48	2023	Residential	Same specifications as Sunteck City Avenue 1 as they are part of the same township
185	Sunteck City Avenue 4 Tower 2	Goregaon 19°08′45″N 72°50′56″E	–	167 (548)	48	2023	Residential	Same specifications as Sunteck City Avenue 1 as they are part of the same township
186	Raheja Legend	Worli 19°00′35″N 72°49′13″E	–	167 (548)	40	2011	Residential	
187	Park Mist	Dadar 19°01′21″N 72°50′23″E	–	165 (541)	46	2021	Residential	
188	73 East	Kandivali 19°12′25″N 72°49′58″E	–	165.55 (543)	49	2026	Mixed-use	Topped out and structurally completed, handover expected in 2025. Height confirmed in RERA document.
189	Lodha Elisium	Wadala 19°02′16″N 72°52′42″E	–	165 (541)	45	2016	Residential	
190	Lodha Estrella	Wadala 19°02′19″N 72°52′43″E	–	165 (541)	45	2016	Residential	
191	Lodha Dioro	Wadala 19°02′16″N 72°52′44″E	–	165 (541)	45	2016	Residential	
192	Lodha Altia	Wadala 19°02′19″N 72°52′40″E	–	165 (541)	45	2016	Residential	
193	Lodha Enchante	Wadala 19°02′14″N 72°52′43″E	–	165 (541)	45	2020	Residential	
194	Lodha Evoq	Wadala 19°02′12″N 72°52′43″E	–	165 (541)	45	2016	Residential	
195	Lodha Gardenia	Wadala 19°02′21″N 72°52′46″E	–	165 (541)	45	2020	Residential	
196	Lodha Exelus	Wadala 19°02′23″N 72°52′45″E	–	165 (541)	28	2019	Office	
197	Runwal Sanctuary Tower 1	Mulund 19°10′27″N 72°56′20″E	–	165 (541)	49	2023	Residential	
198	Runwal Sanctuary Tower 2	Mulund 19°10′25″N 72°56′19″E	–	165 (541)	49	2023	Residential	
199	Runwal Sanctuary Tower 3	Mulund 19°10′24″N 72°56′22″E	–	165 (541)	49	2023	Residential	
200	Oberoi Woods Tower I	Goregaon 19°10′11″N 72°51′54″E	–	165 (541)	40	2009	Residential	Topped out in 2008
201	Oberoi Woods Tower II	Goregaon 19°10′10″N 72°51′57″E	–	165 (541)	40	2009	Residential	Topped out in 2008
202	Oberoi Woods Tower III	Goregaon 19°10′13″N 72°51′57″E	–	165 (541)	40	2009	Residential	Topped out in 2008
203	Dynamix Divum	Malad 19°10′43″N 72°52′18″E	–	163.8 (537)	38	2022	Residential	
204	Springs Mills Tower	Wadala 19°00′40″N 72°51′05″E	–	160 (525)	41	2020	Residential	
205	Parinee I	Andheri 19°08′05″N 72°50′08″E	–	160 (525)	33	2025	Office	
207	Runwal Greens Cedar	Mulund 19°09′37″N 72°56′44″E	–	158.13 (519)	45	2015	Residential	
208	Tirumala Habitats	Mulund 19°11′04″N 72°56′50″E	–	158 (518)	44	2017	Residential	
209	RNA Mirage	Worli 19°00′35″N 72°49′17″E		158 (518)	41	2010	Residential	
210	Sheth Montana Sierra	Mulund 19°10′13″N 72°56′10″E	–	157.90 (518)	46	2022	Residential	
211	Sheth Montana Rosa A	Mulund 19°10′13″N 72°56′12″E	–	157.90 (518)	46	2022	Residential	
212	Sheth Montana Rosa B	Mulund 19°10′14″N 72°56′13″E	–	157.90 (518)	46	2022	Residential	
213	Sheth Montana Giona B	Mulund 19°10′15″N 72°56′14″E	–	157.90 (518)	46	2022	Residential	
214	Sheth Montana Giona A	Mulund 19°10′16″N 72°56′14″E	–	157.90 (518)	46	2022	Residential	
215	Sheth Montana Blissberg	Mulund 19°10′18″N 72°56′14″E	–	157.90 (518)	46	2026	Residential	
216	MRVDC (World Trade Center)	Cuffe Parade 18°54′52″N 72°49′03″E		155.90 (511)	35	1970	Office	
217	St. Regis Mumbai	Lower Parel 18°59′40″N 72°49′26″E	–	155 (509)	40	2012	Hotel	
218	Runwal Greens Cypress	Mulund 19°09′36″N 72°56′42″E	–	154.20 (506)	48	2015	Residential	
219	N Rose Northern Heights Tower 1	Dahisar 19°14′56″N 72°51′51″E	–	154 (505)	47	2023	Residential	
220	N Rose Northern Heights Tower 2	Dahisar 19°14′57″N 72°51′52″E	–	154 (505)	47	2023	Residential	
221	Lodha Primo	Parel 19°00′05″N 72°50′26″E	–	154 (505)	45	2021	Residential	
222	Prestige Turf Towers	Lower Parel 18°59′18″N 72°49′31″E	–	154 (505)	35	2024	Office	
223	Sugee Marina Bay	Worli 19.011867°N 72.819863°E	–	153.92 (505)	38	2026	Residential	
224	White City Tower 1	Kandivali 19°12′03″N 72°52′36″E	–	153.71 (504)	42	2022	Residential	
225	White City Tower 2	Kandivali 19°12′04″N 72°52′37″E	–	153.71 (504)	42	2022	Residential	
226	Rivali Park A	Kandivali 19°13′02″N 72°51′56″E		153.7 (504)	42	2018	Residential	
227	Rivali Park D	Kandivali 19°13′03″N 72°51′53″E		153.7 (504)	42	2018	Residential	
228	Romell Aether	Goregaon 19°10′11″N 72°51′11″E	–	153.7 (504)	42	2020	Residential	
229	Bismillah Heights	Bhuleshwar 18°57′49″N 72°49′53″E	–	153.4 (503)	42	2018	Residential	
230	Ruparel Nova	Sewri 19°00′24″N 72°51′02″E	–	153 (502)	44	2022	Residential	
231	Magnum Tower 1	Lalbaug 18°59′31″N 72°50′16″E	–	152.9 (502)	44	2017	Residential	
232	Shreepati Arcade	Nana Chowk 18°57′45″N 72°48′45″E		152.50 (500)	45	2002	Residential	
233	Runwal Greens Ebony	Mulund 19°09′35″N 72°56′40″E	–	151.43 (497)	43	2015	Residential	
234	Runwal Greens Redwood	Mulund 19°09′37″N 72°56′38″E	–	151.43 (497)	43	2015	Residential	
235	Vasant Polaris	Goregaon 19°09′18″N 72°51′00″E	–	151 (495)	40	2009	Residential	
236	Runwal Greens Pinewood	Mulund 19°09′38″N 72°56′38″E	–	150.85 (495)	47	2015	Residential	
237	Runwal Greens Oakwood	Mulund 19°09′40″N 72°56′39″E	–	150.75 (495)	42	2015	Residential	
238	Runwal Greens Maple	Mulund 19°09′39″N 72°56′40″E	–	150.75 (495)	42	2015	Residential	
239	Runwal Greens Rosewood	Mulund 19°09′38″N 72°56′42″E	–	150.75 (495)	42	2015	Residential	
240	Ruparel SkyGreens A	Kandivali 19°12′18″N 72°49′59″E	–	150.15 (493)	41	2023	Residential	
241	Ruparel SkyGreens B	Kandivali 19°12′18″N 72°50′00″E	–	150.15 (493)	41	2023	Residential	
242	Le Palazzo	Nana Chowk 18°57′44″N 72°48′41″E	–	150 (492)	46	2013	Residential	
243	One International Centre T4	Lower Parel 19°00′35″N 72°50′08″E	–	150 (492)	37	2022	Office	
244	Oberoi Skyheights Tower 1	Lokhandwala 19°08′39″N 72°49′17″E	–	150 (492)	37	2009	Residential	

== Tallest under construction ==
This list ranks buildings that are under construction in Mumbai and are planned to rise at least 150 metres (492 ft) or 40 floors tall. Proposed buildings are not included in this table.

Sr	Name	Location	Height	Floors	Expected year of completion
1	Sugee Empire Tower	Grant Road	311 metres (1,020 ft)	67	2028
2	Aaradhya Avaan 1	Tardeo	307 metres (1,007 ft)	80	2028
3	BDD Commercial Tower	Worli	295 metres (968 ft)	74	2031
4	Aaradhya Avaan 2	Marine Drive	295 metres (968 ft)	77	2028
6	Sheth One Marina	Marine Drive	290 metres (951 ft)	70	2029
7	Radius Harbour Heights C	Byculla	280 metres (919 ft)	68	-
8	BDD Sales A	Worli	272 metres (892 ft)	74	2031
10	BDD Sales B	Worli	272 metres (892 ft)	74	2031
11	BDD Sales C	Worli	272 metres (892 ft)	74	2031
12	BDD Sales D	Worli	272 metres (892 ft)	74	2031
13	BDD Sales E	Worli	272 metres (892 ft)	74	2031
14	BDD Sales F	Worli	272 metres (892 ft)	74	2031
15	BDD Sales G	Worli	272 metres (892 ft)	74	2031
16	BDD Sales H	Worli	272 metres (892 ft)	74	2031
17	BDD Sales I	Worli	272 metres (892 ft)	74	2031
18	BDD Sales J	Worli	272 metres (892 ft)	74	2031
19	One Mahalaxmi Tower A	Mahalaxmi	270 metres (886 ft)	70	2028
20	One Mahalaxmi Tower B	Mahalaxmi	270 metres (886 ft)	70	2028
22	Satellite Sesen	Nepean Sea Road	270 metres (886 ft)	65	2027
23	Omkar 1973 Tower C	Worli	267 metres (876 ft)	73	2029
24	Ruparel Ariana	Sewri	267 metres (877 ft)	73	2026
25	Birla Niyara Estate A	Worli	250 metres (820 ft)	75	2026
26	Birla Niyara Estate B	Worli	250 metres (820 ft)	75	2026
27	Ozone Autograph	Wadala	250 metres (820 ft)	70	2026
28	Jangid Trinity	Kandivali	250 metres (820 ft)	57	2028
29	Raheja Riviere	Worli	245 metres (804 ft)	70	2025
30	Tejukaya Parel A Wing	Parel	245 metres (804 ft)	70	2028
31	Tejukaya Parel B Wing	Parel	245 metres (804 ft)	70	2028
32	45 RCR A	Worli	245 metres (804 ft)	64	2024
33	45 RCR B	Worli	245 metres (804 ft)	64	2024
34	Summer Trinity Vertical	Elphinstone	242 metres (794 ft)	53	2019
35	Prestige Ocean Towers South	Girgaon	241.90 metres (794 ft)	57	2031
36	HBS View 360	Mahalaxmi	240 metres (787 ft)	60	2020
37	Kalpataru Elan	worli	240 metres (787 ft)	66	2027
38	Godrej Sky	Parel	235 metres (771 ft)	66	2020
39	STG Starliving	Thane	235 metres (771 ft)	72	2026
40	L & T Rejuve Tower 1	Mulund	235 metres (771 ft)	67	2025
41	L & T Rejuve Tower 2 and 3	Mulund	235 metres (771 ft)	67	2025
42	L & T Rejuve Tower 4 and 5	Mulund	235 metres (771 ft)	67	2025
43	Aga Hall Estate B Wing	Mazgaon	235 metres (771 ft)	65	2027
44	Prestige Ocean Towers North	Girgaon	234.10 metres (768 ft)	55	2030
45	MX Residential	Grant Road	230 metres (755 ft)	57	2030
46	Richa Park Marina	Dadar	227 metres (745 ft)	62	2019
44	Island City Centre 3	Wadala	227 metres (745 ft)	67	2019
45	Belle T1	Sewri	227 metres (745 ft)	63	2031
46	Belle T2	Sewri	227 metres (745 ft)	63	2031
47	Belle T3	Sewri	227 metres (745 ft)	63	2031
48	Oberoi Pokhran Tower 1	Pokhran Road	225 metres (738 ft)	73	2025
51	Oberoi Pokhran Tower 2	Pokhran Road	225 metres (738 ft)	73	2025
52	Oberoi Pokhran Tower 3	Pokhran Road	225 metres (738 ft)	73	2025
53	Oberoi Pokhran Tower 4	Pokhran Road	225 metres (738 ft)	73	2025
54	Oberoi Pokhran Tower 5	Pokhran Road	225 metres (738 ft)	73	2025
55	Oberoi Pokhran Tower 6	Pokhran Road	225 metres (738 ft)	73	2025
56	Oberoi Pokhran Tower 7	Pokhran Road	225 metres (738 ft)	73	2025
57	Oberoi Pokhran Tower 8	Pokhran Road	225 metres (738 ft)	73	2025
58	Oberoi Pokhran Tower 9	Pokhran Road	225 metres (738 ft)	73	2025
59	Oberoi Pokhran Tower 10	Pokhran Road	225 metres (738 ft)	73	2025
61	Krishvi	Grant Road	223 metres (732 ft)	65	2028
62	Prestige Mahalaxmi A	Mahalaxmi	220 metres (722 ft)	54	2025
63	Prestige Mahalaxmi B	Mahalaxmi	220 metres (722 ft)	54	2025
64	Oberoi Pokhran Tower 11	Pokhran Road	220 metres (722 ft)	70	2025
65	Oberoi Pokhran Tower 12	Pokhran Road	220 metres (722 ft)	70	2025
66	Oberoi Pokhran Tower 13	Pokhran Road	220 metres (722 ft)	70	2025
67	Oberoi Pokhran Tower 14	Pokhran Road	220 metres (722 ft)	70	2025
68	Oberoi Pokhran Tower 15	Pokhran Road	220 metres (722 ft)	70	2025
69	Oberoi Pokhran Tower 16	Pokhran Road	220 metres (722 ft)	70	2025
70	Oberoi Pokhran Tower 17	Pokhran Road	220 metres (722 ft)	70	2025
71	Oberoi Pokhran Tower 18	Pokhran Road	220 metres (722 ft)	70	2025
72	Oberoi Pokhran Tower 19	Pokhran Road	220 metres (722 ft)	70	2025
73	Oberoi Pokhran Tower 20	Pokhran Road	220 metres (722 ft)	70	2025
73	Oberoi Pokhran Tower 21	Pokhran Road	220 metres (722 ft)	70	2025
74	Oberoi Pokhran Tower 22	Pokhran Road	220 metres (722 ft)	70	2025
75	Oberoi Pokhran Tower 23	Pokhran Road	220 metres (722 ft)	70	2025
76	Oberoi Pokhran Tower 24	Pokhran Road	220 metres (722 ft)	70	2025
77	Oberoi Pokhran Tower 25	Pokhran Road	220 metres (722 ft)	70	2025
78	Oberoi Pokhran Tower 26	Pokhran Road	220 metres (722 ft)	70	2025
79	Baya Upper Nest Tower A	Mulund	220 metres (722 ft)	57	COMPLETED 2023
80	Baya Upper Nest Wing B	Mulund	220 metres (722 ft)	57	COMPLETED 2023
81	Runwal Pinnacle Wing A & B	Mulund	220 metres (722 ft)	65	COMPLETED 2023
82	Runwal Pinnacle Wing D	Mulund	220 metres (722 ft)	65	COMPLETED 2023
83	Northern Supremus A Wing	Dahisar	220 metres (722 ft)	66	2020
84	Northern Supremus B Wing	Dahisar	220 metres (722 ft)	66	2020
85	Imerial Tower I	Tardeo	220 metres (722 ft)	57	2027
86	Imerial Odyessy	Girgaon	220 metres (722 ft)	50	2027
87	BDD Sales A	Naigaon	220 metres (722 ft)	58	2031
88	BDD Sales B	Naigaon	220 metres (722 ft)	58	2031
89	BDD Sales C	Naigaon	220 metres (722 ft)	58	2031
90	BDD Sales D	Naigaon	220 metres (722 ft)	58	2031
91	Transcon Ocean	Mulund	220 metres (722 ft)	55	2028
92	Transcon Ocean	Mulund	220 metres (722 ft)	55	2028
93	Prestige Nautilus	Worli	220 metres (722 ft)	52	2032
94	Bhoomi Simmera A	Lalbaug	215 metres (705 ft)	60	2025
95	Bhoomi Simmera B	Lalbaug	215 metres (705 ft)	60	2025
96	Bhoomi Simmera C	Lalbaug	215 metres (705 ft)	60	2025
97	VR 3	Thane	214 metres (702 ft)	55	2029
98	RNA Metropolis 1	Sewri	210 metres (689 ft)	67	2020
99	Vertica	Marine Drive	210 metres (689 ft)	63	2028
100	CPWD T 1	Wadala	210 metres (689 ft)	50	2029
101	CPWD T 2	Wadala	210 metres (689 ft)	50	2029
102	Urmi Estate 2	Lower Parel	210 metres (689 ft)	49	COMPLETED 2020
103	Marathon Monte South Wing C	Byculla	210 metres (689 ft)	64	COMPLETED 2020
104	Marathon Monte South Wing D	Byculla	210 metres (689 ft)	64	COMPLETED 2020
105	HBS Marine View	Girgaon	210 metres (689 ft)	60	2020
106	Runwal Forets T5	Kanjurmarg	210 metres (689 ft)	67	2028
107	Runwal Forets T6	Kanjurmarg	210 metres (689 ft)	67	2028
108	Runwal Forets T7	Kanjurmarg	210 metres (689 ft)	67	2028
109	Runwal Forets T12	Kanjurmarg	210 metres (689 ft)	67	2028
110	Shreepati Skies	Tardeo	210 metres (689 ft)	65	2030
111	Ashar Plus 1 & 2	Thane	210 metres (689 ft)	65	2027
112	Ruparel Jewel	Parel	210 metres (689 ft)	63	2027
113	Oberoi Forestory A	Kolshet	208 metres (682 ft)	66	2027
114	Oberoi Forestory B	Kolshet	208 metres (682 ft)	66	2027
115	Oberoi Forestory C	Kolshet	208 metres (682 ft)	66	2027
116	Oberoi Forestory D	Kolshet	208 metres (682 ft)	66	2027
117	Oberoi Forestory E	Kolshet	208 metres (682 ft)	66	2027
118	G.M Marg	Worli	207 metres (679 ft)	49	2030
119	Discovery Offices	Mulund	205 metres (673 ft)	50	2018
120	MSRTC Maha Sentral T 2	Mumbai Central	205 metres (673 ft)	49	2031
121	Parinee Xclsive	Worli	205 metres (673 ft)	50	2022
122	Piramal Revanta Tower G	Mulund	205 metres (673 ft)	60	2024
123	Piramal Revanta Tower H	Mulund	205 metres (673 ft)	60	2024
124	Piramal Revanta Tower I	Mulund	205 metres (673 ft)	60	2024
125	SD Epsilon Tower C	Kandivali	205 metres (673 ft)	69	COMPLETED 2020
126	SD Astron Tower A	Kandivali	205 metres (673 ft)	69	COMPLETED 2020
127	SD Astron Tower B	Kandivali	205 metres (673 ft)	69	COMPLETED 2020
128	SD Astron Tower C	Kandivali	205 metres (673 ft)	69	2026
129	Rubberwala Eon	Parel	205 metres (673 ft)	56	2028
130	Sarova Height B	Kandivali	203 metres (666 ft)	58	2023
131	Sarova Height C	Kandivali	203 metres (666 ft)	58	2023
132	Sarova Height D	Kandivali	203 metres (666 ft)	58	2023
133	Raheja Modern Vivarea A	Mahalaxami	201 metres (659 ft)	51	2026
134	Raheja Modern Vivarea B	Mahalaxami	201 metres (659 ft)	51	2026
135	The Legacy	Worli	200 metres (656 ft)	45	2027
136	Belle Vue A & B	Mulund	200 metres (656 ft)	60	2020
137	Siesta A & B @ The Prestige City	Mulund	200 metres (656 ft)	55	2025
138	Bellanza A & B @ The Prestige City	Mulund	200 metres (656 ft)	55	2025
138	Bellanza C & D @ The Prestige City	Mulund	200 metres (656 ft)	55	2025
139	Radius Harbour Heights B	Byculla	200 metres (656 ft)	50	2021
142	Radius Harbour Heights C	Byculla	200 metres (656 ft)	50	2021
143	Radius Harbour Heights D	Byculla	200 metres (656 ft)	50	2021
144	Radius Harbour Heights E	Byculla	200 metres (656 ft)	50	2021
145	Shana Ramtekdi	Sion	200 metres (656 ft)	50	2021
146	Shana Ramtekdi	Sion	200 metres (656 ft)	50	2021
147	Marathon Monte South Wing B	Byculla	200 metres (656 ft)	60	2019
148	Marathon Monte South Wing E	Byculla	200 metres (656 ft)	60	2020
149	Marathon Monte South Wing F	Byculla	200 metres (656 ft)	60	2020
150	Shapoorji Pallonji Mumbai Dreams 1	Mulund	200 metres (656 ft)	55	2021
151	Shapoorji Pallonji Mumbai Dreams 2	Mulund	200 metres (656 ft)	55	2021
152	Shreeji Skyrise	Kandivali	200 metres (656 ft)	60	2027
153	Aga Hall Estate Wing A	Mazgaon	200 metres (656 ft)	54	2027
155	SBUT Cluster 6A 1	Bhendi Bazaar	200 metres (656 ft)	59	2028
156	SBUT Cluster 6A 2	Bhendi Bazaar	200 metres (656 ft)	59	2028
157	VR 2	Thane	197 metres (646 ft)	51	2029
158	Navy Quarters A	Colaba	197 metres (646 ft)	63	2026
159	Navy Quarters B	Colaba	197 metres (646 ft)	63	2027
160	Navy Quarters C	Colaba	197 metres (646 ft)	63	2028
161	Navy Quarters D	Colaba	197 metres (646 ft)	63	2029
162	Navy Quarters E	Colaba	197 metres (646 ft)	63	2030
163	Navy Quarters F	Colaba	197 metres (646 ft)	63	2030
164	Navy Quarters G	Colaba	197 metres (646 ft)	63	2031
165	Navy Quarters H	Colaba	197 metres (646 ft)	63	2031
166	Navy Quarters E	Colaba	197 metres (646 ft)	63	2029
167	Adhiraj Alishan B Wing	Kharghar	195 metres (640 ft)	54	2025
168	Adhiraj Alishan C Wing	Kharghar	195 metres (640 ft)	54	2025
169	Adhiraj Alishan D Wing	Kharghar	195 metres (640 ft)	54	2025
170	The Wemblu	Thane	195 metres (640 ft)	60	2028
171	7 Hughes	Hughes Road	190 metres (623 ft)	50	2021
172	BDD Sales A	Lower Parel	190 metres (623 ft)	52	2031
173	BDD Sales B	Lower Parel	190 metres (623 ft)	52	2031
174	BDD Sales C	Lower Parel	190 metres (623 ft)	52	2031
175	BDD Sales D	Lower Parel	190 metres (623 ft)	52	2031
176	Lotus Enpar C	Lower Parel	190 metres (623 ft)	50	2027
177	Doodhwala Residential	Mumbai Central	190 metres (623 ft)	50	2031
178	The Stellar	Thane	187 metres (614 ft)	55	2031
179	Kathawala the serai residences	Byculla	187 metres (614 ft)	50	2026
180	Runwal 25 hours A	Manpada	182 metres (597 ft)	55	2026
181	Runwal 25 hours B	Manpada	182 metres (597 ft)	55	2026
182	Lodha BelleVue 1	Mahalaxmi, Mumbai	182 metres (597 ft)	56	2026
183	The Monark	Marine Drive	180 metres (591 ft)	54	2029
184	Ahuja Link	Andheri	180 metres (591 ft)	52	2023
185	Roswalt Zaiden A & B	Goregaon	180 metres (591 ft)	50	2028
186	Roswalt Zaiden C & D	Goregaon	180 metres (591 ft)	50	2028
188	Siddha Seabrook B	Kandivali	180 metres (591 ft)	53	2024
189	Siddha Seabrook C	Kandivali	180 metres (591 ft)	53	2024
190	Shreeji Flora	Borivali	180 metres (591 ft)	48	2027
191	Hiranandani Skylark	Thane	180 metres (591 ft)	55	2026
192	Piramal Revanta Tower C	Mulund	178 metres (584 ft)	47	COMPLETED 2021
193	Piramal Revanta Tower D	Mulund	178 metres (584 ft)	47	COMPLETED 2021
194	Piramal Revanta Tower E	Mulund	178 metres (584 ft)	48	COMPLETED 2021
195	Piramal Revanta Tower F	Mulund	178 metres (584 ft)	48	COMPLETED 2021
196	An Nasr A	Bhendi Bazaar, Byculla	177 metres (581 ft)	53	2026
197	An Nasr B	Bhendi Bazaar, Byculla	177 metres (581 ft)	53	2026
198	Marathon Monte Carlo	Mulund	174 metres (571 ft)	43	COMPLETED 2021
199	Marathon Monte Millenia	Mulund	174 metres (571 ft)	43	COMPLETED 2021
200	Beaumonte C	Nerul	174 metres (571 ft)	50	2027
201	Beaumonte D	Nerul	174 metres (571 ft)	50	2027
202	Beaumonte E	Nerul	174 metres (571 ft)	50	2027
203	Lodha BelleVue 4	Mahalaxmi, Mumbai	173 metres (568 ft)	55	2026
204	DS Spring	Pokhran Road	173 metres (568 ft)	55	2026
205	Runwal 25 hours E	Maanpada	173 metres (568 ft)	55	2026
206	Runwal 25 hours F	Maanpada	173 metres (568 ft)	55	2026
207	Al Ezz	Bhendi Bazaar, Byculla	172 metres (564 ft)	53	2025
208	Naman Xana	Worli 19°00′13″N 72°48′47″E	171.80 (564)	41	2027
209	Majestic	Marine Drive	171 metres (561 ft)	50	2026
210	Sanjay Puri	Marine Drive	170 metres (558 ft)	50	2028
211	Runwal Santuchry Tower 1	Mulund	170 metres (558 ft)	50	2026
212	Runwal Santuchry Tower 2	Mulund	170 metres (558 ft)	50	2026
213	Runwal Santuchry Tower 3	Mulund	170 metres (558 ft)	50	2022
214	Surya	Lower Parel	170 metres (558 ft)	50	2029
215	Dosti Eastern Bay D	Wadala	170 metres (558 ft)	54	2026
216	G3	Girgaum	170 metres (558 ft)	48	2023
217	Prakash Cotton Mill Rehab	Worli	170 metres (558 ft)	47	2027
218	Adhiraj Mainland A & B	Kharghar	170 metres (558 ft)	50	2029
219	TPA Office	Goregaon	170 metres (558 ft)	40	2029
220	Lodha BelleVue 3	Mahalaxmi, Mumbai	169 metres (554 ft)	55	2026
221	Iris	Thane	169 metres (554 ft)	52	2027
222	Runwal 25 hours D	Manpada	173 metres (568 ft)	54	2026
223	Runwal 25 hours G	Manpada	173 metres (568 ft)	54	2026
224	Provenance Land Office	Worli	168 metres (551 ft)	40	2027
225	Seth Edmount	Kandivali	168 metres (551 ft)	52	2028
226	Hiranandani Castalia	Kandivali	167 metres (548 ft)	48	2026
227	Dynamic Avanya 1	Dahisar	165 metres (541 ft)	45	2024
228	SRA MX 1	Goregaon	165 metres (541 ft)	45	2029
229	SRA MX 2	Goregaon	165 metres (541 ft)	45	2029
230	Dynamic Avanya 2	Dahisar	165 metres (541 ft)	45	COMPLETED 2024
231	Dynamic Avanya 3	Dahisar	165 metres (541 ft)	45	COMPLETED 2024
232	Dynamic Avanya 4	Dahisar	165 metres (541 ft)	45	COMPLETED 2024
233	Lodha NCP 8	Wadala	165 metres (541 ft)	45	COMPLETED 2024
234	Lodha NCP 9	Wadala	165 metres (541 ft)	45	COMPLETED 2024
235	Lodha NCP 10	Wadala	165 metres (541 ft)	45	COMPLETED 2024
236	Lodha NCP 11	Wadala	165 metres (541 ft)	45	COMPLETED 2024
237	Lodha NCP 12	Wadala	165 metres (541 ft)	45	COMPLETED 2024
238	Runwal Liberty	Kanjurmarg	165 metres (541 ft)	50	2028
239	Dimple 73	Kandivali	165 metres (541 ft)	46	2025
240	Sky Heights	Kandivali	165 metres (541 ft)	49	2026
241	Hiranandani Falcon	Thane	164 metres (538 ft)	47	2027
242	Piramal Revanta Tower B	Mulund	162 metres (531 ft)	44	COMPLETED 2020
243	Godrej Horizon A	Wadala	160 metres (525 ft)	48	2027
244	Godrej Horizon B	Wadala	160 metres (525 ft)	48	2028
245	Godrej Horizon C	Wadala	160 metres (525 ft)	48	2029
246	Godrej Horizon D	Wadala	160 metres (525 ft)	48	2027
247	Godrej Horizon E	Wadala	160 metres (525 ft)	48	2029
248	Godrej Horizon F	Wadala	160 metres (525 ft)	48	2027
249	Vora Centrico	Goregaon	160 metres (525 ft)	40	2025
250	Ahuja Altus	Lower Parel	160 metres (525 ft)	44	2021
251	Runwal Boleuvard Tower 1	Kanjurmarg	160 metres (525 ft)	51	2026
252	Runwal Boleuvard Tower 2	Kanjurmarg	160 metres (525 ft)	51	2026
253	Runwal Boleuvard Tower 3	Kanjurmarg	160 metres (525 ft)	51	2026
254	Runwal Boleuvard Tower 4	Kanjurmarg	160 metres (525 ft)	51	2021
255	Runwal Boleuvard Tower 5	Kanjurmarg	160 metres (525 ft)	51	2026
256	Runwal Boleuvard Tower 6	Kanjurmarg	160 metres (525 ft)	51	2021
257	Cadbury House	Kanjurmarg	160 metres (525 ft)	38	2027
258	MX Office	Grant Road	160 metres (525 ft)	36	2030
259	Raymond Invictus	Pokhran Road No. 2	160 metres (525 ft)	36	2030
260	Dynamix Divam	Malad	160 metres (525 ft)	49	2026
261	Dynamix Parkwoods A	Thane	160 metres (525 ft)	47	2026
262	Dynamix Parkwoods B	Thane	160 metres (525 ft)	47	2026
263	Kalpataru Elegante	Kandivali	159 metres (522 ft)	47	2025
264	Aveza Tower 1	Mulund	159 metres (522 ft)	41	2022
265	Aveza Tower 2	Mulund	159 metres (522 ft)	41	2022
266	Aveza Tower 3	Mulund	159 metres (522 ft)	41	2022
267	Runwal 25 hours C	Maanpada	159 metres (522 ft)	51	COMPLETED 2026
268	Runwal 25 hours F	Maanpada	159 metres (522 ft)	51	COMPLETED 2026
269	The Waves	Elphinstone	157 metres (515 ft)	37	2022
270	Sky D	Dadar	157 metres (515 ft)	43	2026
271	Emperia	Nerul	157 metres (515 ft)	35	2028
272	Whispering Tower 1	Mulund	157 metres (515 ft)	45	2022
273	Whispering Tower 2	Mulund	157 metres (515 ft)	45	2022
274	Whispering Tower 3	Mulund	157 metres (515 ft)	45	2022
275	Chandak Treesourous A	Mulund	157 metres (515 ft)	47	2027
276	Chandak Treesourous B	Mulund	157 metres (515 ft)	47	2027
277	Dream Atlanis	Kalyan	157 metres (515 ft)	47	2028
278	Meridian Courty A & B	Kandivali	157 metres (515 ft)	48	2027
279	Meridian Courty C	Kandivali	157 metres (515 ft)	48	2027
280	Phoenix Rise 2	Lower Parel	155 metres (509 ft)	37	2029
281	Shapoorji Pallonji Northern Lights A & B	Pokhran Road	155 metres (509 ft)	45	2023
282	Shapoorji Pallonji Northern Lights C & D	Pokhran Road	155 metres (509 ft)	45	2023
283	Shapoorji Pallonji Northern Lights E & F	Pokhran Road	155 metres (509 ft)	45	2023
284	Shapoorji Pallonji Northern Lights Wing G & H	Pokhran Road	155 metres (509 ft)	45	2023
285	Shapoorji Pallonji skyra A & B	Pokhran Road	155 metres (509 ft)	45	2023
286	Runwal Zenith	Thane	155 metres (509 ft)	50	2027
287	Raymond Ten Wing C & D	Pokhran Road	155 metres (509 ft)	45	2023
288	Raymond Ten Wing E & F	Pokhran Road	155 metres (509 ft)	45	2023
289	Raymond Ten Wing G & H	Pokhran Road	155 metres (509 ft)	45	2023
290	Raymond Ten Wing I & J	Pokhran Road	155 metres (509 ft)	45	2023
291	Prescon Midtown Bay	Mahim	155 metres (509 ft)	45	2025
292	Senroofs 5	Mulund	155 metres (509 ft)	45	2028
293	Senroofs 6	Mulund	155 metres (509 ft)	45	2028
294	The Altitude	Tardeo	155 metres (509 ft)	42	2028
295	Royal Lagoon B Wing	Malad	155 metres (509 ft)	39	2025
296	Royal Lagoon B Wing	Malad	155 metres (509 ft)	39	2025
297	Icon	Nerul	155 metres (509 ft)	35	2027
298	Magnum Tower 2	Lower Parel	152.9 metres (502 ft)	44	2028
299	Majestic Tower 1	Mulund	152 metres (499 ft)	43	2022
300	Majestic Tower 2	Mulund	152 metres (499 ft)	43	2022
301	Majestic Tower 3	Mulund	152 metres (499 ft)	43	2022
302	Majestic Tower 4	Mulund	152 metres (499 ft)	43	2022
303	Piramal Vaikunt C T1	Balkum	152 metres (499 ft)	47	2028
304	Piramal Vaikunt C T2	Balkum	152 metres (499 ft)	47	2028
305	Piramal Vaikunt C T3	Balkum	152 metres (499 ft)	47	2028
306	Liberty Towern 3	Worli	151 metres (495 ft)	33	2024
307	Ruparel SkyGreens C	Kandivali	150.15 metres (493 ft)	41	2027
308	73 East	Kandivali	150 metres (492 ft)	50	2025
309	Mahavir Ville	Matunga	150 metres (492 ft)	45	2027
310	Raptakos & Berett	Worli	150 metres (492 ft)	41	2029
311	Raheja Prime 1	Nerul	150 metres (492 ft)	36	2027
312	Samiran	Thane	150 metres (492 ft)	36	2031
313	Summer Armonia	Mazgaon	150 metres (492 ft)	47	2028
314	Shristi Sea View	Mahim	150 metres (492 ft)	41	COMPLETED 2021
315	Lokhandwala One	Worli	150 metres (492 ft)	41	2021
316	Piramal Revanta Tower A	Mulund	150 metres (492 ft)	41	COMPLETED 2020
317	Plus Art	Lower Parel	150 metres (492 ft)	41	2021
318	Estella Bellagio	Mahalaxmi	150 metres (492 ft)	41	2022
319	Mumbai 11	Mahalaxmi	150 metres (492 ft)	41	2022
320	Chaitaya Heights 1	Lalbaug	150 metres (492 ft)	43	2024
321	Chaitaya Heights 2	Lalbaug	150 metres (492 ft)	43	2024
322	Ruparel Palacio	Kandivali	150 metres (492 ft)	42	COMPLETED 2022
323	Transcon Triumph	Andheri	150 metres (492 ft)	42	COMPLETED 2021
324	Ariisto Somment	Andheri	150 metres (492 ft)	42	2022
325	Godrej Nest 1	Kandivali	150 metres (492 ft)	44	COMPLETED 2022
326	Sai World City A, B and C Wing.	Kharghar	150 metres (492 ft)	41	2025
327	Sai World City D and E Wing.	Kharghar	150 metres (492 ft)	48	2025
328	Sai World City F, G, H and I Wing.	Kharghar	150 metres (492 ft)	41	2025
329	Sai World City J Wing.	Kharghar	150 metres (492 ft)	41	2025
330	Sai World City K and L Wing.	Kharghar	150 metres (492 ft)	41	2025
331	Sai World City M and N Wing.	Kharghar	150 metres (492 ft)	41	2025
332	Rustomjee Summit	Kandivali	150 metres (492 ft)	40	COMPLETED 2024
333	Shreepati Gardens A	Parel	150 metres (492 ft)	43	2026
334	Shreepati Gardens B	Parel	150 metres (492 ft)	43	2026
335	Kalpataru Elitus A wing	Mulund	150 metres (492 ft)	39	COMPLETED 2024
336	Kalpataru Elitus B and C wing	Mulund	150 metres (492 ft)	48	COMPLETED 2025
337	Veena Smart Homes	Kandivali	150 metres (492 ft)	40	2026
338	Applaud 38	Goregaon	150 metres (492 ft)	38	COMPLETED 2024
339	Manora Amdar Niwas	Nariman Point	150 metres (492 ft)	45	2027
340	Rustomjee La Familia A & B Wing	Majiwada	150 metres (492 ft)	43	2026
341	Asford Cross Town Towe A & B	Mulund	150 metres (492 ft)	44	2027
342	Asford Cross Town Towe C & D	Mulund	150 metres (492 ft)	44	2027
343	Asford Cross Town Towe E	Mulund	150 metres (492 ft)	44	2027
344	VR 1	Thane	150 metres (492 ft)	41	2029
345	Atlantis A	Kandivali	150 metres (492 ft)	44	2028
346	Atlantis B	Kandivali	150 metres (492 ft)	44	2028
347	SBUT Cluster 5 Commercial	Bhendi Bazaar	150 metres (492 ft)	37	2028
348	Tharwani Majestic	Kalyan	150 metres (492 ft)	45	2027
349	Siddha Worli	Worli	150 metres (492 ft)	40	2029
350	Lodha Sattadhar	Worli	150 metres (492 ft)	40	2028
351	Hinduja House	Worli	150 metres (492 ft)	32	2028
352	Kalpataru Summit	Mulund	150 metres (492 ft)	35	2025
353	Jangid Elysium	Kandivali	150 metres (492 ft)	35	2028
354	Metro Bhavan	Dahisar	150 metres (492 ft)	32	2028
355	Ajmera Manhattan	Wadala	150 metres (492 ft)	43	2028
356	Ruparel Millenia	Sewri	150 metres (492 ft)	45	2026
357	Ruparel Vivanaza	Parel	150 metres (492 ft)	40	2027
358	Lodha Casa Premier	Dombivli	150 metres (492 ft)	40	2028

== Tallest proposed ==
This list ranks buildings that are approved or proposed but without any active construction work, and are planned to rise at least 150 m (490 ft) or 50 floors tall.

Rank	Name	Status	Locality	Planned height	Floors	Citation(s)
1	Lodha Project Wadala	Proposed	Wadala	530 metres (1,739 ft)	101	
2	Joyus Housing	Proposed	Girgaon	486 metres (1,594 ft)	125	
3	Raheja Imperia	Approved	Worli	400 metres (1,312 ft)	100	
4	Shreepati Garden Tower 1	Approved	Parel	400 metres (1,312 ft)	110	
5	Shreepati Garden Tower 2	Approved	Parel	400 metres (1,312 ft)	110	
6	Celestia Spaces 1	Proposed	Sewri	400 metres (1,312 ft)	80	
7	Celestia Spaces 2	Proposed	Sewri	400 metres (1,312 ft)	80	
8	Celestia Spaces 3	Proposed	Sewri	400 metres (1,312 ft)	80	
9	Celestia Spaces 4	Proposed	Sewri	400 metres (1,312 ft)	80	
10	Celestia Spaces 5	Proposed	Sewri	400 metres (1,312 ft)	80	
11	Celestia Spaces 6	Proposed	Sewri	400 metres (1,312 ft)	80	
12	Celestia Spaces 7	Proposed	Sewri	400 metres (1,312 ft)	80	
13	Celestia Spaces 8	Proposed	Sewri	400 metres (1,312 ft)	80	
14	Ocean Towers	Approved	Charni Road	331 metres (1,086 ft)	74	
15	Matru Mandir	Proposed	Tardeo	325 metres (1,066 ft)	100	
16	India International Trade Center	Proposed	Nariman Point	320 metres (1,050 ft)	72	
17	Shreepati Skies	Approved	Tardeo	301 metres (988 ft)	88	
18	Waves	Proposed	Worli	301 metres (988 ft)	80	
19	Indra Tower	Proposed	Dadar	300 metres (984 ft)	80	
20	Twisting Horizons	Proposed	Worli	267 metres (876 ft)	70	
21	Hubtown Realms	Approved	Gamdevi	260 metres (853 ft)	60	
22	Oberoi Garden City 7	Proposed	Goregaon	270 metres (886 ft)	68	
23	Oberoi Garden City 8	Proposed	Goregaon	270 metres (886 ft)	68	
24	Oberoi Garden City 9	Proposed	Goregaon	270 metres (886 ft)	68	
25	Oberoi Garden City 10	Proposed	Goregaon	270 metres (886 ft)	68	
26	Oberoi Garden City 11	Proposed	Goregaon	270 metres (886 ft)	68	
27	Oberoi Sky City Tower F	Approved	Borivali	240 metres (787 ft)	60	
28	Oberoi Sky City Tower G	Approved	Borivali	240 metres (787 ft)	60	
29	Oberoi Sky City Tower H	Approved	Borivali	240 metres (787 ft)	60	
30	Oberoi Sky City Tower I	Approved	Borivali	240 metres (787 ft)	60	
31	Oberoi Sky City Tower J	Approved	Borivali	240 metres (787 ft)	60	
32	Oberoi Skyz Tower 1	Proposed	Worli	230 metres (755 ft)	65	
33	Oberoi Skyz Tower 2	Proposed	Worli	230 metres (755 ft)	65	
34	Marina Apartments 1	Approved	Dadar	227 metres (745 ft)	62	
35	Hubtown Bay 1	Approved	Worli	224 metres (735 ft)	55	
36	Hubtown Bay 2	Approved	Worli	224 metres (735 ft)	55	
37	Hubtown Bay 3	Approved	Worli	224 metres (735 ft)	55	
38	Shreepati Estate	Approved	Lower Parel		82	
39	Trident Tower 1	Proposed	Parel		69	
40	Trident Tower 2	Proposed	Parel		61	
41	Shreepati Garden Tower 3	Approved	Parel		68	
42	Shreepati Garden Tower 4	Approved	Parel		68	

=== On-Hold ===
This list ranks buildings that were once under construction and are now on-hold and are planned to rise at least 150 m (490 ft) or 40 floors tall.

Name	Locale	Planned height	Floors	Status
Century IT Park	Worli	300 metres (984 ft)	80	On hold
Orchid Turf View A	Mahalaxmi	273 metres (896 ft)	76	On hold
Orchid Turf View B	Mahalaxmi	265 metres (869 ft)	70	On hold
Sumer Harbour Heights D	Byculla	260 metres (853 ft)	63	On hold
Parinee Billions	Worli	250 metres (820 ft)	62	On hold
Satellite 47 Racecourse Tower A	Worli	Unknown	60	On hold
Satellite 47 Racecourse Tower B	Worli	Unknown	60	On hold
Orchid Views 1	Jacob Circle	Unknown	56	On hold
Orchid Views 2	Jacob Circle	Unknown	56	On hold
Shreepati Castle	Grant Road	172 metres (564 ft)	52	On hold
Tata Aveza 1	Mulund	159 metres (522 ft)	50	On hold
Tata Aveza 2	Mulund	159 metres (522 ft)	50	On hold
Tata Aveza 3	Mulund	159 metres (522 ft)	50	On hold
Oberoi Skyheights Tower 2	Andheri	150 metres (492 ft)	37	On hold

== Timeline of tallest buildings ==
Name	Image	Height	Floors	Years as tallest
Usha Kiran Building		80 metres (262 ft)	25	1961–1963
Matru Mandir		86 metres (282 ft)	25	1963–1970
World Trade Center Mumbai		156 metres (512 ft)	35	1970–2009
Planet Godrej		181 metres (594 ft)	51	2009–2010
Lodha Bellissimo		222 metres (728 ft)	53	2010–2010
Imperial Towers		256 metres (840 ft)	60	2010–2020
World One		280.2 metres (919 ft)	76	2020–2022
Lokhandwala Minerva		301 metres (988 ft)	78	2022–present

== See also ==
- List of tallest buildings in India
- List of tallest buildings and structures in the Indian subcontinent
- List of tallest buildings in Asia
- List of tallest buildings in different cities in India
- List of tallest buildings in Chennai
- List of tallest buildings in Navi Mumbai
