= Mintage World =

Mintage World is a virtual online museum of coins, currency notes and postage stamps. It was launched on April 23, 2016, at coin & philately fair held at the World Trade Center, Mumbai.

It is an online platform for learning about ancient coins, notes and stamps and the history of Numismatics, Notaphily and Philately. The virtual online museum has information on more than sixty thousand coins, fifteen hundred notes and five thousand stamps from ancient to modern times across the world. It classifies exhibits according to ancient, medieval, colonial and modern.

The museum was started by Mr. Sushil Kumar Agarwal, MD and CEO of Ultra Media & Entertainment Pvt. Ltd.
