= Mini Sabarimala =

- Ayyappa Temple
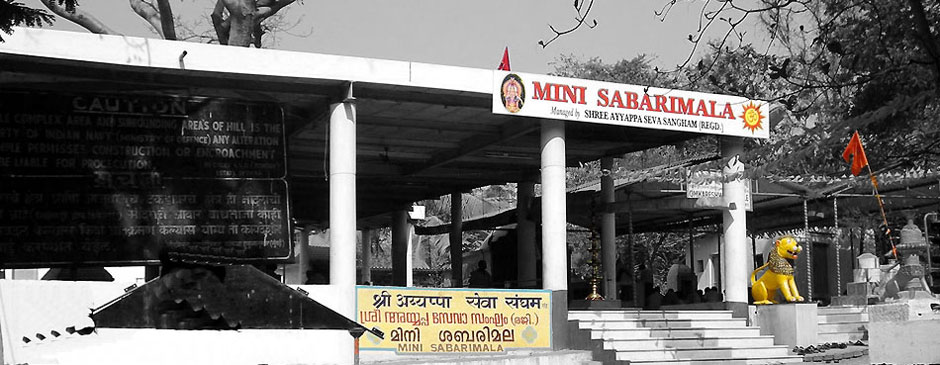

- Location within Mumbai
- Coordinates: 19.133193°N 72.921522°E
- Country: India
- State: Maharashtra
- District: Mumbai Suburban
- Metro: Mumbai
- Time zone: UTC+5:30 (IST)
- PIN: 400078
- Telephone code: 022
- Website: www.minisabarimala.org

Mini Sabarimala, situated on a hillock surrounded by hills and valleys within the precincts of NCH Colony, Kanjurmarg (West), Mumbai, is the first ancient Ayyappa Temple outside Kerala State.

As revealed by the astrologer Shri Karuvatta Kochugovindan, there was a big Devi temple and a small Ayyappa temple at this place, where today stands the temple of Shree Mini Sabarimala. These temples were destroyed by the foreign invaders. The remnants of these can be seen even today. The invaders also killed the priests of these temples.

Since then the devotees used to worship Shri Ayyappa in the same dilapidated temple. Therefore, after the formation of the temple trust in 1960, a need was felt to perform certain purification rites or the Dosha Parihara Kriyas like Astha Mangala Deva Prashanam. These rites were the prerequisites for starting the main construction work and re-installation of images.

Accordingly, in 1980, after performing Ashta Mangala Deva Prashanam, the temple trust started the construction work as per the details in Tantra Vidhi and Thachu Shastra of Kerala. They reconstructed the main Ayyappa temple in the center and temples of Devi Bhuvaneshvari and Shri Ganesha to its left and right respectively. Sarpakavu or the Nagadevatas were also installed in the Northeastern corner.

Punahpratishtha or the reinstallation of Shri Ayyappa image and other images made of Panchaloha was done on Pushya Nakshatra day of the Kerala Hindu calendar, in the Midhunam (June–July) month by Shri Pullamvazhi Devan Narayanan Namboothiri, Pullamvazhi illam, Haripad, the famous Vedic and Tantra scholar from Kerala.

During the year 2000, again the Ashta Mangala Deva Prashanam was performed. Various Poojas and Homams and Kalashabhishekam were performed by Mahatanthri Shri Devan Vasudevan Namboothiri.
