= Four Seasons Private Residences Mumbai =

Residential tower building in Mumbai, India

Four Seasons Private Residences
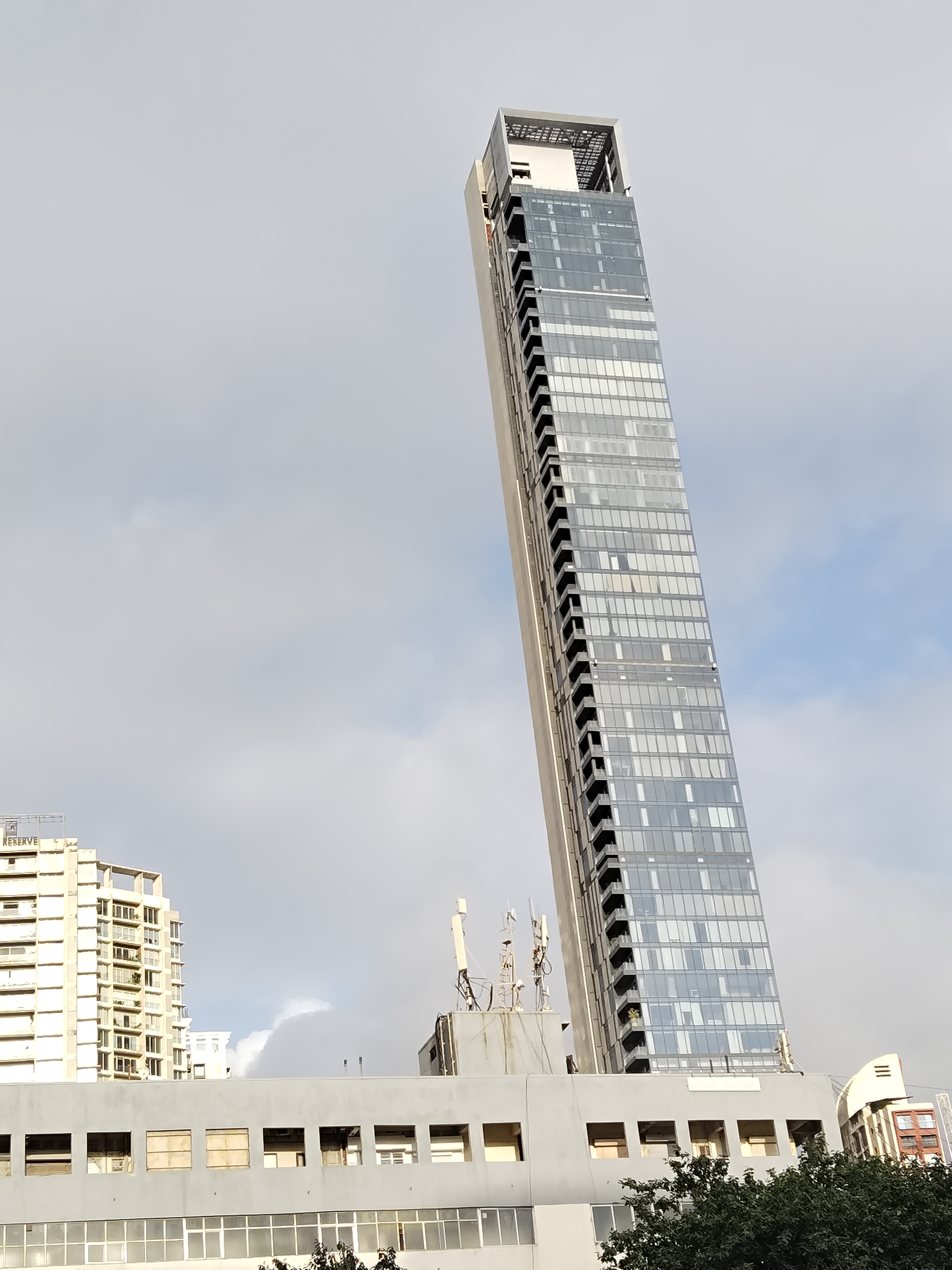
- Interactive map of the Four Seasons Private Residences area

General information
- Status: Completed
- Type: Luxury Residential Skyscraper
- Location: Worli, Mumbai, India, 1H/136, Dr Elijah Moses Rd, Gandhi Nagar, Upper Worli, Worli, Mumbai
- Coordinates: 18.99426°N 72.82028°E
- Construction started: 2014
- Completed: 2021
- Owner: Four Seasons Hotels and Resorts

Height
- Roof: 250 m (820 ft)

Technical details
- Material: Glass / Reinforced Concrete
- Floor count: 55

Design and construction
- Architect: Gensler
- Developer: Provenance Land Pvt. Ltd.
- Structural engineer: Magnusson Klemencic Associates (Structure); J. Roger Preston Limited (MEP)

Website
- Four Seasons Mumbai Residences

The Four Seasons Private Residences is a Luxury Residential skyscraper in the Worli district of Mumbai, India. Built between 2014 and 2021, the tower stands at 250 m (820 ft) tall with 55 floors and is the current 22nd tallest building in Mumbai as well as the 23rd tallest in India.

== History ==
=== Architecture ===
The tower was designed by the American studio Gensler for its architecture and Canadian studio Yabu Pushelberg for its interior. It is located in the Worli district of Mumbai. It is part of the same building complex alongside Four Seasons Hotel Mumbai and the proposed Four Seasons Serviced Apartments building. The tower houses a total of 26 luxury apartment units under hotelier tenancy owned by the Four Seasons Hotels and Resorts franchise. The tower's architectural design has a slenderness ratio of 1:10 (floor to height ratio). This, according to RP Realty Plus, is the only slender tower in Mumbai. Residents were also allowed to customize their bedroom facades.

Glenn Pushelberg of Yabu Pushelberg stated that the building concept focused on the interaction between the interior and exterior. For this project, his firm took a minimalist approach in the space, with "bold statements" coming from pops of color or specific finishes.

== See also ==
- List of tallest buildings in India
- List of tallest buildings in Mumbai
- List of tallest buildings and structures in the Indian subcontinent
