= Shreepati Arcade =

Building in Mumbai, India

Shreepati Arcade "A" Wing
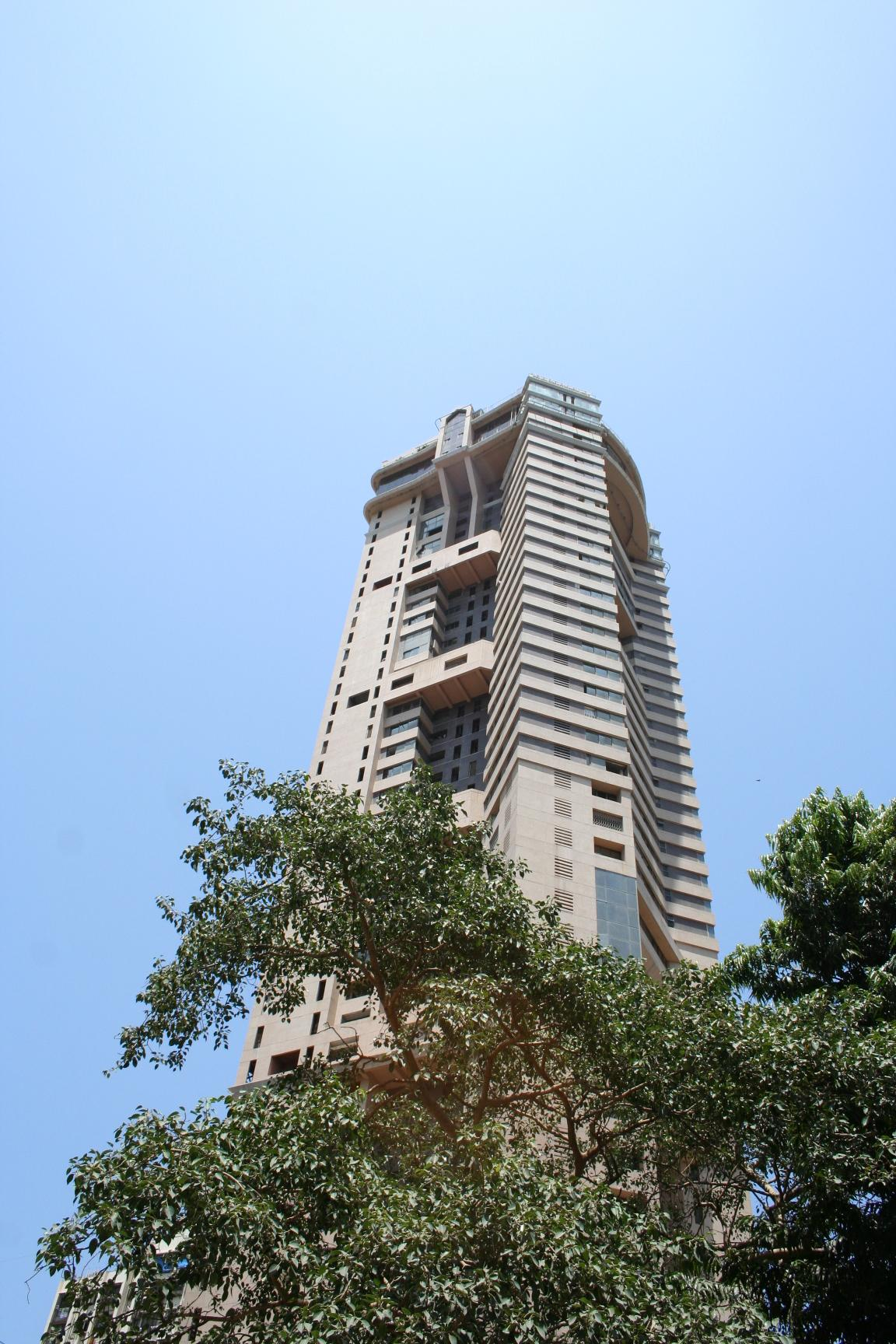
- Side view of Shreepati Arcade
- Interactive map of the Shreepati Arcade "A" Wing area

General information
- Status: Completed
- Type: Residential Skyscraper
- Location: Mumbai
- Coordinates: 18.9628316°N 72.8124194°E
- Opening: 2002

Height
- Roof: 154 m (505 ft)

Technical details
- Floor count: 45
- Lifts/elevators: 6

Design and construction
- Architect: Ar. Reza Kabul

Shreepati Arcade is a residential skyscraper which was completed in 2002. It is located at Nana Chowk, Mumbai, Maharashtra, India, just off Grant Road bridge in the heart of the city of Mumbai.

The building is 154 meters (500 ft) tall and contains 45 floors. There are six Swiss Schindler's lifts, high speed elevators of up to 4 metres per second, which take only 35 seconds to go from Ground to 45th floor. The Fire fighting safety systems within the building are totally automated. It has a sprinkler system, the main and kitchen doors are two hour fire rated and current flows through insulated wires in a 'bus bar' system. The skyscraper is earthquake resistant.

The club house of the Shreepati Arcade is equipped with a swimming pool, gymnasium, steam, sauna & jacuzzi. This building has a residence restriction that all residents must be vegetarian. This kind of practice is not considered unusual in Mumbai.

== See also ==
- List of tallest buildings in India
- List of tallest buildings in Mumbai
- List of tallest structures in India
- List of tallest buildings in different cities in India
- List of tallest buildings and structures in the Indian subcontinent
- List of tallest buildings in Asia
- List of tallest residential buildings
