= Usha Kiran Building =

Residential complex in Mumbai, India

- Interactive map of the Usha Kiran Building area

General information
- Type: Residential
- Architectural style: Modernism
- Location: Tardeo, Mumbai, India, Carmichael Road, Tardeo, Mumbai 400 026, Maharashtra, India
- Coordinates: 28.7093°N 77.1757°E
- Completed: 1961
- Inaugurated: 1961

Height
- Top floor: 80 m (260 ft)

Technical details
- Floor count: 25

Design and construction
- Architect: Dilawar Noorani
- Main contractor: Karim Noorani and Co

Usha Kiran Building is a residential complex in the neighbourhood of Tardeo in Mumbai, India. At 80 m (260 ft), it became the first skyscraper in Mumbai and surpassed the LIC Building in Chennai to become the tallest building in the country and held the title until 1970 when the 35-storied World Trade Centre, Mumbai was built in South Mumbai.

== History ==
The building was completed in 1961.

== Location ==
The tower is located on Carmichael Road in the neighbourhood of Tardeo. The tower is the only high-rise building on the Carmichael Road locality. The building was designed by Dilawar Noorani, an architect from Mumbai, working for Karim Noorani and Co.

== The tower ==
The tower rises to 80 m (260 ft) and has 25 floors. It was one of the few buildings in the city to have its own swimming pool in the 1960s.

== Incidents ==
A fire broke out in the building on 27 June 2020, reportedly starting in a car park. Five cars were damaged, but no casualties were reported.

== See also ==
- List of tallest buildings in Mumbai
- List of tallest buildings in India
