= Orchid Enclave =

Orchid enclave
- Interactive map of the Orchid enclave area

General information
- Type: Residential Apartments
- Location: Mumbai, India
- Coordinates: 18.9676°N 72.8236°E
- Topped-out: 2009
- Estimated completion: 2017
- Owner: DB Realty

Height
- Antenna spire: 210 m (689.0 ft)
- Roof: 210 m (689.0 ft)

Technical details
- Floor count: 50 (excl. 5 reserved for parking)

Design and construction
- Main contractor: Khan & Co. Infra Project Pvt. Ltd.

Orchid Enclave is a pair of residential skyscrapers in Mumbai, Maharashtra, India.The building has 55 floors, including five floors for parking. The construction of the building was completed by Khan Group in February 2017.

== Features ==
The complex have 3.4 acres (14,000 m^{2}) of podium garden. The five levels of car parking can accommodate 1,000 cars at a time.

== See also ==
- List of tallest buildings in Mumbai
- List of tallest buildings in India
- List of tallest buildings and structures in the Indian subcontinent
