= LIC Building =

Southern headquarters of the Life Insurance Corporation of India in Chennai

LIC Building, Chennai
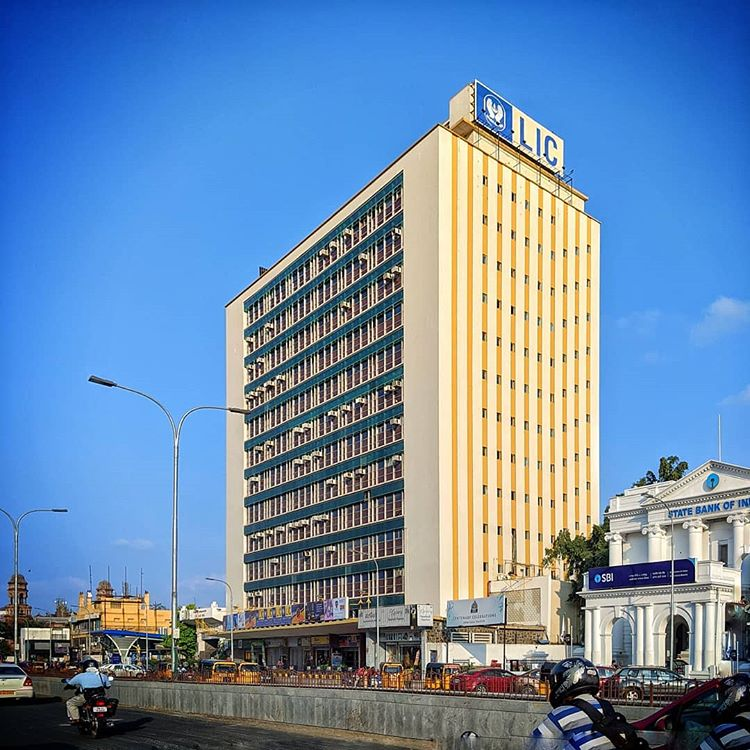
- LIC Building at Chennai, was the tallest skyscraper in India when it was inaugurated in 1959.
- Interactive map of the LIC Building, Chennai area

Record height
- Tallest in India from 1959 to 1961^{[I]}

General information
- Type: Commercial offices
- Architectural style: Modernism (RCC-framed construction)
- Location: Anna Salai, Chennai, India, 102, Anna Salai, Chennai, Tamil Nadu 600 002, India
- Coordinates: 13.064283°N 80.266065°E
- Construction started: 1953; 73 years ago
- Completed: 1959; 67 years ago
- Inaugurated: 23 August 1959; 67 years ago
- Cost: ₹87 lakh ₹330 crore (2016 prices)
- Owner: Life Insurance Corporation of India

Height
- Roof: 54 m (177 ft)
- Top floor: 44 m (144 ft)

Technical details
- Floor count: 15
- Floor area: 11,700 m^{2} (126,000 sq ft)

Design and construction
- Architects: H. J. Brown and L. C. Moulin (1953-1957); L. M. Chitale (1958)
- Developer: Coromandel Engineering Limited (Murugappa Group)

LIC Building is a 15-storied building in Chennai, India, serving as the southern headquarters of the Life Insurance Corporation of India. It is the first skyscraper built in India and an important landmark in the city. Located on the arterial Anna Salai (formerly Mount Road), the building is 54 m (177 ft) tall. Initially built with 12 floors, the LIC Building was the tallest building in India when it was completed in 1959 and was surpassed by Mumbai's first skyscraper, the Usha Kiran Building, in 1961, which is about 80 m (260 ft) high. The building marked the transition from lime-and-brick construction to concrete columns in the region. The building is also known for using pile foundation technique for the first time in the region. It was the tallest building in Chennai for over 35 years before being surpassed by the Hyatt Regency Building (erstwhile Magunta Oberoi) on Anna Salai and the Arihant Majestic Towers in Koyambedu, both in the mid-1990s.

== History ==
Before the construction of the LIC building, the Madras Publishing House, a printing and publishing organization, occupied the place and establishments such as Murray & Company auctioneers and Pioneer Laundry service (started in 1918) stood on the same plot. In 1943, the Raja of Bobbili took over the plot, and in 1951 he sold it as real estate to the United India Insurance Company. M. Ct. M. Chidambaram Chettyar, the founder of Indian Overseas Bank and the United India Insurance, decided to construct an 18-storey building for his group's headquarters, and conceived the building in 1952 as the head office of United India Life Assurance and New Guardian Life Insurance. As technology to build tall buildings was not available in India back then, the London-based architects H. J. Brown and L. C. Moulin was assigned to design the building. The building was built on the lines of the UN Secretariat building in New York City. Although the construction was commenced in 1953, the architects withdrew in 1957; the rest of the construction was overseen by L. M. Chitale, a city-based architect. The building was constructed by the Murugappa Group's Coromandel Engineering. However, Chidambaram died in an air-crash in Singapore on 13 March 1954, when the building was still under construction. Much of the raw materials for the building were brought from England. When insurance was nationalised in 1956, the government took over the building's construction, and the height of the building was reduced to 12 floors. The construction was completed in the year 1959, and the building was unveiled on 23 August the same year by the then-Union Finance Minister Morarji Desai. The completed office building was to become the zonal and Madras divisional office of Life Insurance Corporation of India (LIC) and not that of the United India Life Insurance due to the nationalisation of the insurance service, and all the assets were made over to LIC.

Two additional floors were added following a refurbishment of the building after a fire accident damaged the building in 1975.

== Design and structure ==
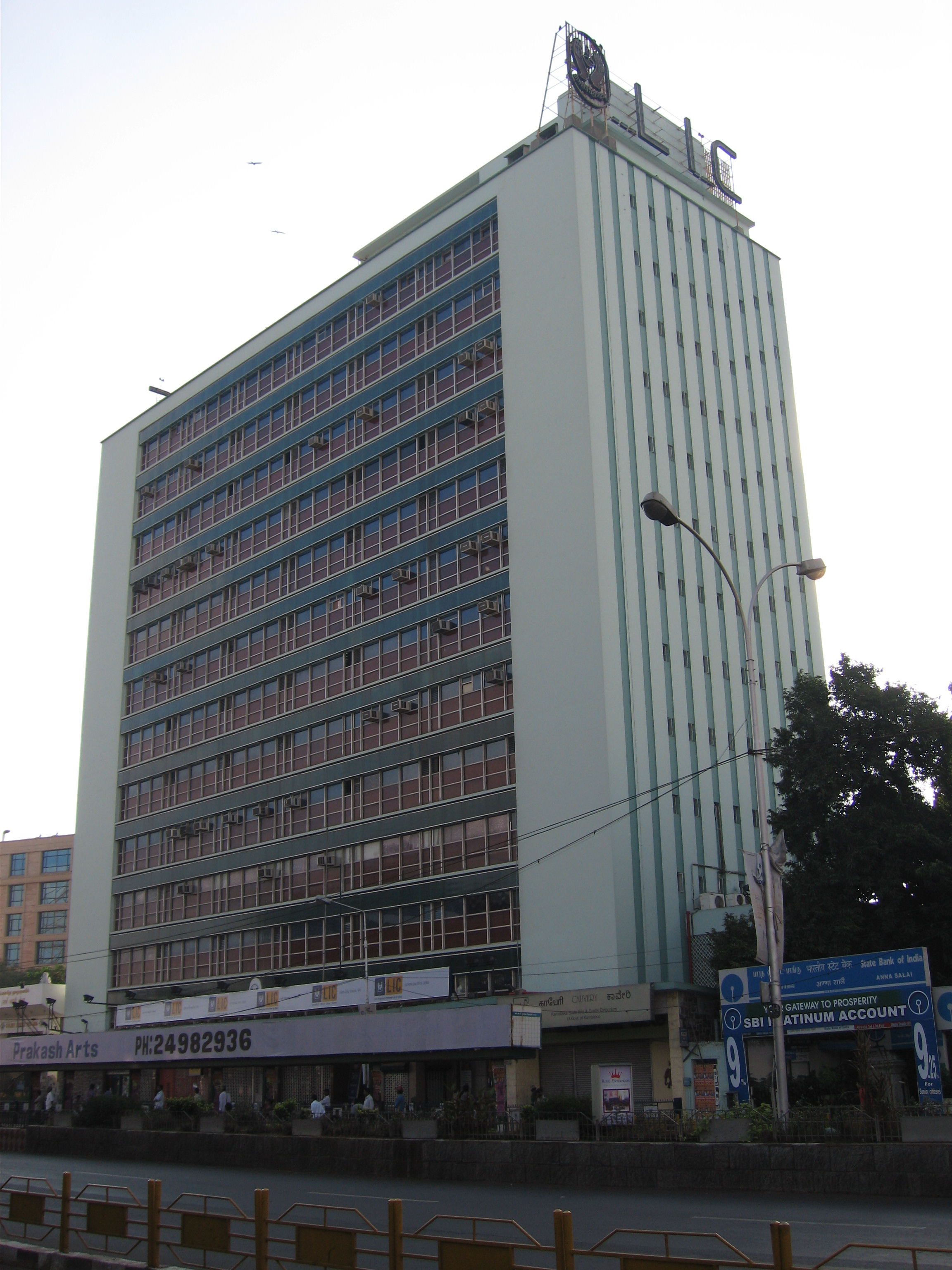
A view of the building from the southwestern side

Built on a 55-ground plot, the building was of enclosed construction with glass facings at front and rear. The building consists of 15 floors—13 levels with 2 basement floors. The building is of RCC-framed construction designed for central air conditioning, designed in the shape of well-proportioned box with strip glass façade. The air conditioning plant is in the sub-basement floor. The top floor of the building reaches a height of 44 meters, and the total height of the building is 177 feet. The building occupies 52,800 sq ft. The total floor area of the building is 1,26,000 sq ft. The building stands on 521 pneumatic caisson piles that run to a depth of 35 ft below the ground. The building was built at a cost of ₹ 8.7 million in 1959. The building consumed about 26,000 sq ft of special glass that was treated with infra-red rays, stove enameled, and made water resistant with synthetic enamel paint. About 1,000 tons of steel and 3,000 tons of cement were used in the construction of the building. The building could provide modern office accommodation for over 1,500 persons, and was built with five automatic lifts.

The building is the first structure in Chennai to have electric elevator and 400-tonne centrifugal air-conditioning plant.

Fire-fighting design

As fire fighting arrangement, the building has one 15-cm diameter riser feeding first-aid hose reels as well as fire extinguishers. For feeding the hose reels, there are two overhead tanks. Connected to the air-conditioning plant is two large vertical shafts located at one end of the building going up to the roof—one meant for the supply of conditioned air and the other for return air. These shafts are closed at the top except for a small vent. All the floors have false ceilings made of Sitatex boards on wooden frames. The space above the false ceilings is utilised as plenum with three horizontal ducts running through the length of the building acting as supply air ducts. The central duct is of galvanised iron sheets. The side walls, above which the glass facings are fitted, has several openings on the window sills, through grills which communicate with the side ducts in the floor just below. These openings are also for the supply of conditioned air. The plenum as well as supply air ducts connected with vertical shafts are provided with inspection doors made of timber which open out directly to the staircase landings on each floor. At each end, a staircase is provided. The lift shafts are adjoining the vertical air shafts at one end.

Energy-saving design

The building has concrete walls on the eastern and western sides, preventing sun rays from penetrating the building during sunrise and sunset and keeping the temperature inside the building stable, and glass windows on the southern and northern sides. Owing to this design, the glass windows provide enough lighting without heating up the building.

== Incidents ==
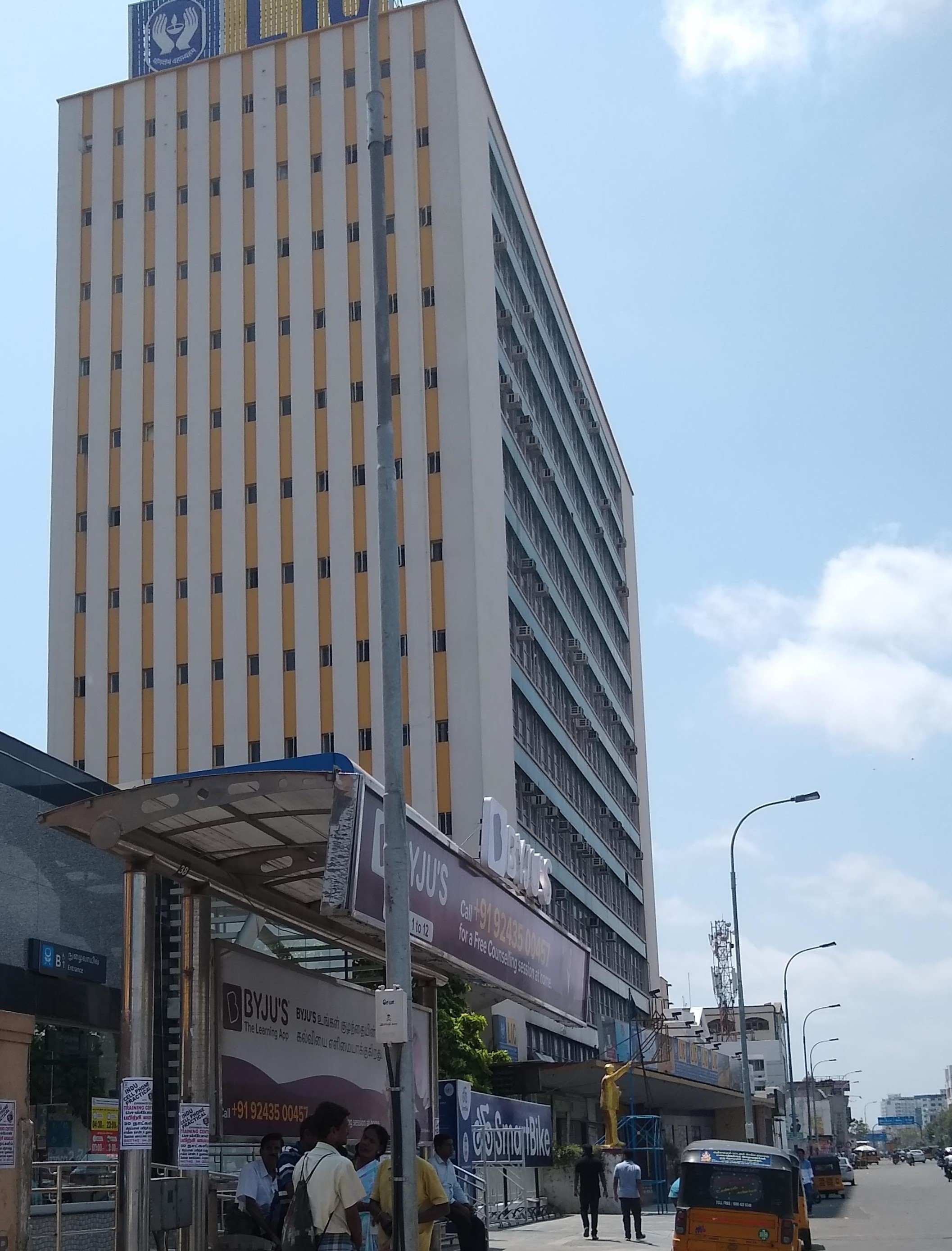
View from the northern side

Four fire incidents have been reported in the building's history in 1964, 1975, 2016, and 2023.

On 11 July 1975, a major fire incident occurred in the building. The fire was first observed on the first floor at about 8.00 pm local time, and it spread rapidly to the floors above through several vertical openings and shafts. The incident necessitated deployment of the entire fire fighting resources of the city, including units from the Chennai Port Trust, refineries, and so on. The operations continued overnight and concluded at about 6.00 pm the following day. During the initial stages, the fire-fighting operations were seriously hampered due to falling splinters of glass, burning fragments and molten metal from window frames made of aluminum. In addition, heavy sea breeze aided the rapid spread of fire. As the city hydrants had paucity of water, the fire-fighting operations mostly depended upon the fleet of water lorries provided by the Corporation of Chennai which were utilized for relaying water from the Cooum river which was about 0.5 km away. Although there was no reported loss of life, some members of the fire service unit sustained injuries. From the second floor upwards, all the floors were severely damaged due to the fire. In the upper floors, there was nothing left except the charred and twisted steel furniture. However, the basement housing the IBM machine and air-conditioning plant, the ground floor and the first floor were saved. Some of the upper floors were seen to have developed cracks on the walls and columns. Since the structural stability of the building was in doubt, the building remained out of use for a long time until it was inspected by experts and got repaired. The fire was thought to have originated from some waste materials at the bottom of the vertical shafts. The LIC Building fire had led to focus the existing shortcomings and inadequacies in the design and the state of fire protection of multi-storied buildings in India, and helped in formulating comprehensive recommendations for strengthening fire-protection measures for such high-rise buildings. The total loss was estimated to be ₹50 million.

On 15 June 2009, the building received a bomb threat in the evening, which later turned to be a hoax.

In June 2012, a crack developed on the eleventh floor of the building, which has been attributed to Metro Rail work. It is said that the building experienced a tremor on 25 June 2012, which the occupants suspect is due to the usage of vibratory hammer used by CMRL for tunneling. However, CMRL denied the charge.

On 2 April 2023, a billboard atop the building caught fire at around 6:00 pm local time, perhaps as a result of an electrical short-circuit in the billboard's LED lights. The fire was doused in 20 minutes and there was no casualty.

== In popular culture ==
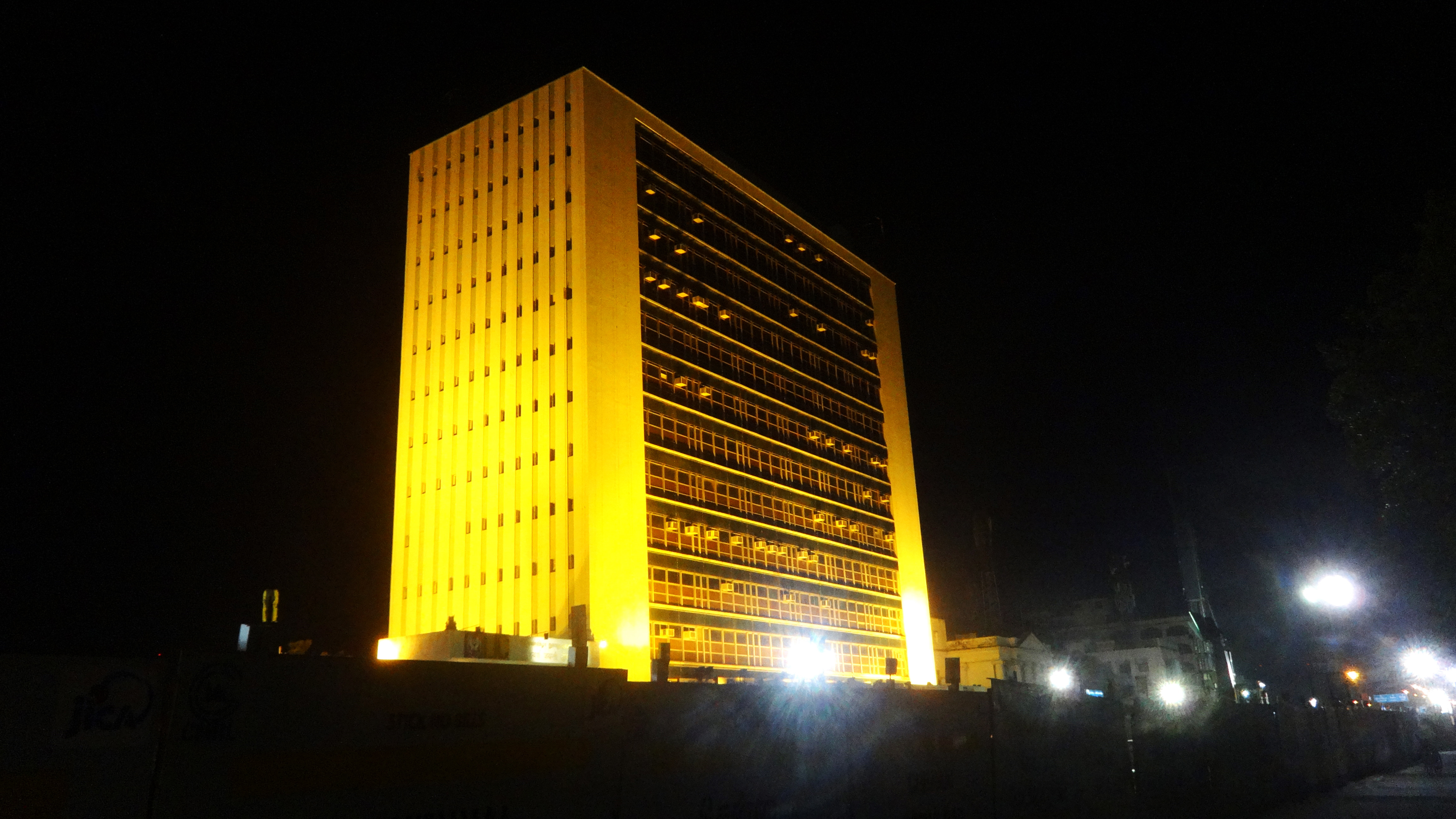
The LIC building at night

Along with the Chennai Central Railway Station and the Anna Flyover, LIC Building is one of the most prominent landmarks in the city that is often featured in movies and other pop culture in the region.

Since the time the building was built, the maximum permissible building height in Chennai was limited to 40 m until 1998, when it was increased to 60 m. Being the first skyscraper of Chennai and the tallest of a few skyscrapers built in the city until that time, the building was regionally considered synonymous for height that it gave birth to the local catch-phrase "as tall as the LIC".

== See also ==
- List of tallest buildings in Chennai
- Architecture of Chennai
- List of tallest buildings in India
- Heritage structures in Chennai
