= Marathon Futurex =

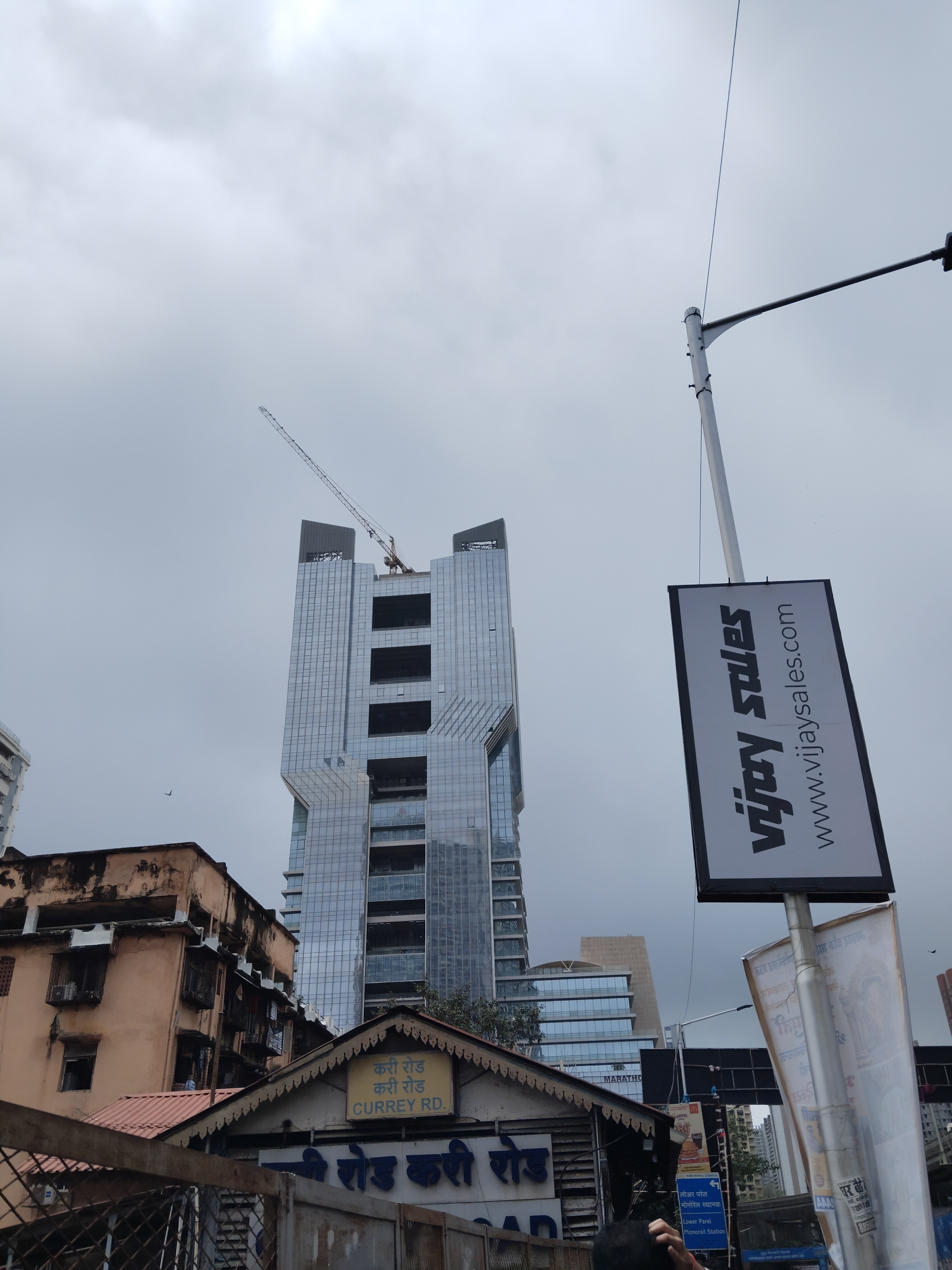
- Interactive map of the Marathon Futurex area

General information
- Status: Architecturally Topped out
- Type: Commercial
- Location: Lower Parel, Mumbai
- Estimated completion: 2024
- Owner: Marathon Group

Height
- Antenna spire: 170 metres (558 ft)

Technical details
- Floor count: 38
- Lifts/elevators: 22

Design and construction
- Architect: ADA
- Developer: Marathon Group

Website
- marathon.in/futurex/

Marathon Futurex is an IT, financial and business Tower launched recently by the Marathon Group at Lower Parel, Mumbai, India. It is centrally located at the busy junction of Lower Parel and Curry Road. It is in close proximity of major business houses like Peninsula Corporate Park, Phoenix Mills, Kamala Mills. The project has been developed in the Mafatlal Mill land complex, will have a total built-up area of about 1.1 million sq ft.

== Construction technology ==
Marathon Futurex has been constructed using the formwork technology of Sten (Spain) and Peri (Germany). It is an energy efficient structure with a full glass façade and modern elevation.

Marathon Futurex has a system to manage, maintain and secure the commercial premises through a Building Management System (BMS). BMS controls technical security features like CCTV, all electronic equipments, access control system, lift system, water and electronics management systems. The BMS system enables micro-check on all aspects of the building to ensure a secure environment to work.

== Green architecture ==
Marathon Futurex is expected to get a gold rating from the Indian Green Building Council (IGBC) for its eco friendly design concept and construction methodology. A solar envelope Design study identified changing thermal patterns throughout the year based on which the cooling of the building has been designed. The building façade is made of double-glazed, Low-e glass that lets in the light but cuts out the heat. During the construction phase materials like fly ash, micro silicon, low volatile organic compound paints, adhesives and other recycled resources have been used to ensure minimal environment damage. The orientation of the building reduces the need for artificial cooling thus conserving energy.

Marathon Futurex has more than 15 sky gardens with glass fences that act as heat barriers during the day. There is a rain water harvesting system and a captive sewage-disposal-plant that aims at zero discharge of water thus helping in water conservation when the building becomes fully functional.

== See also ==
- List of tallest buildings in India
- List of tallest structures in India
- List of tallest buildings in Mumbai
