= Four Seasons Hotel Mumbai =

Building in India

Four Seasons Hotel, Mumbai
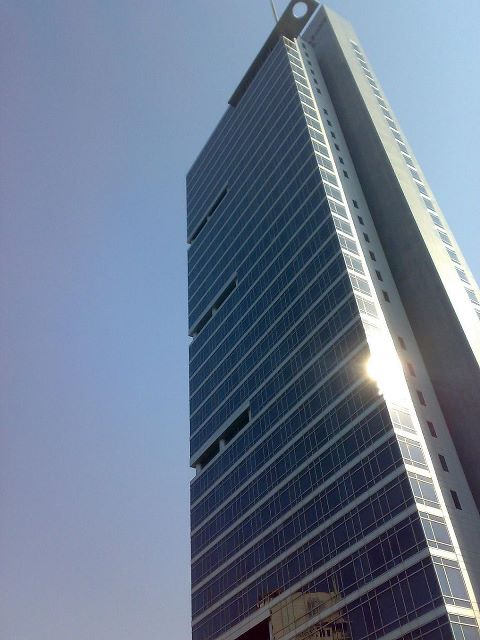
- Four Seasons Tower Mumbai

General information
- Status: Completed
- Type: Commercial Skyscraper
- Location: 144 Dr. E Moses Road, Worli, Mumbai, India
- Coordinates: 18.9944°N 72.8203°E
- Completed: 2007
- Opening: 2007
- Cost: US$100 million
- Owner: Four Seasons Hotels and Resorts

Height
- Roof: 150 m (490 ft)

Technical details
- Material: Glass / Reinforced Concrete
- Floor count: 35

Design and construction
- Architect: John Arzarian of Lohan Associates

Website
- www.fourseasons.com/mumbai/

Four Seasons Hotel, Mumbai is a five-star hotel and part of the Toronto-based Four Seasons luxury hotels and resorts. It is located in the emerging district of Worli, Mumbai, Maharashtra, India . The hotel currently houses 202 guest rooms, and also offers India's highest rooftop bar, Aer.

== History ==
The 35-storey skyscraper was completed in 2008, and designed by John Arzarian of Lohan Associates, a Hong Kong-based company. The hotel's interior was designed by Bilkey-Linas. The civil construction of the building was completed in one and a half years with a slab cycle of 8 days. The 35-storey skyscraper was completed in less than a year, making it one of the fastest constructions of such buildings in India. The project was managed by Mr. Sanjiv Garg, General Manager of Ahluwalia Contracts (I) Ltd., a New Delhi based construction company.

== Restaurants ==
The following restaurants are available at the hotel:

- Café Prato & Bar
- Pool Deck
- San-Qi

== See also ==
- List of tallest buildings in India
- List of tallest buildings in Mumbai
- List of tallest structures in India
- Lists of tallest buildings in India
- List of tallest buildings in Asia
- List of tallest buildings and structures in the Indian subcontinent
