= The Imperial (Mumbai) =

Residential complex in Mumbai

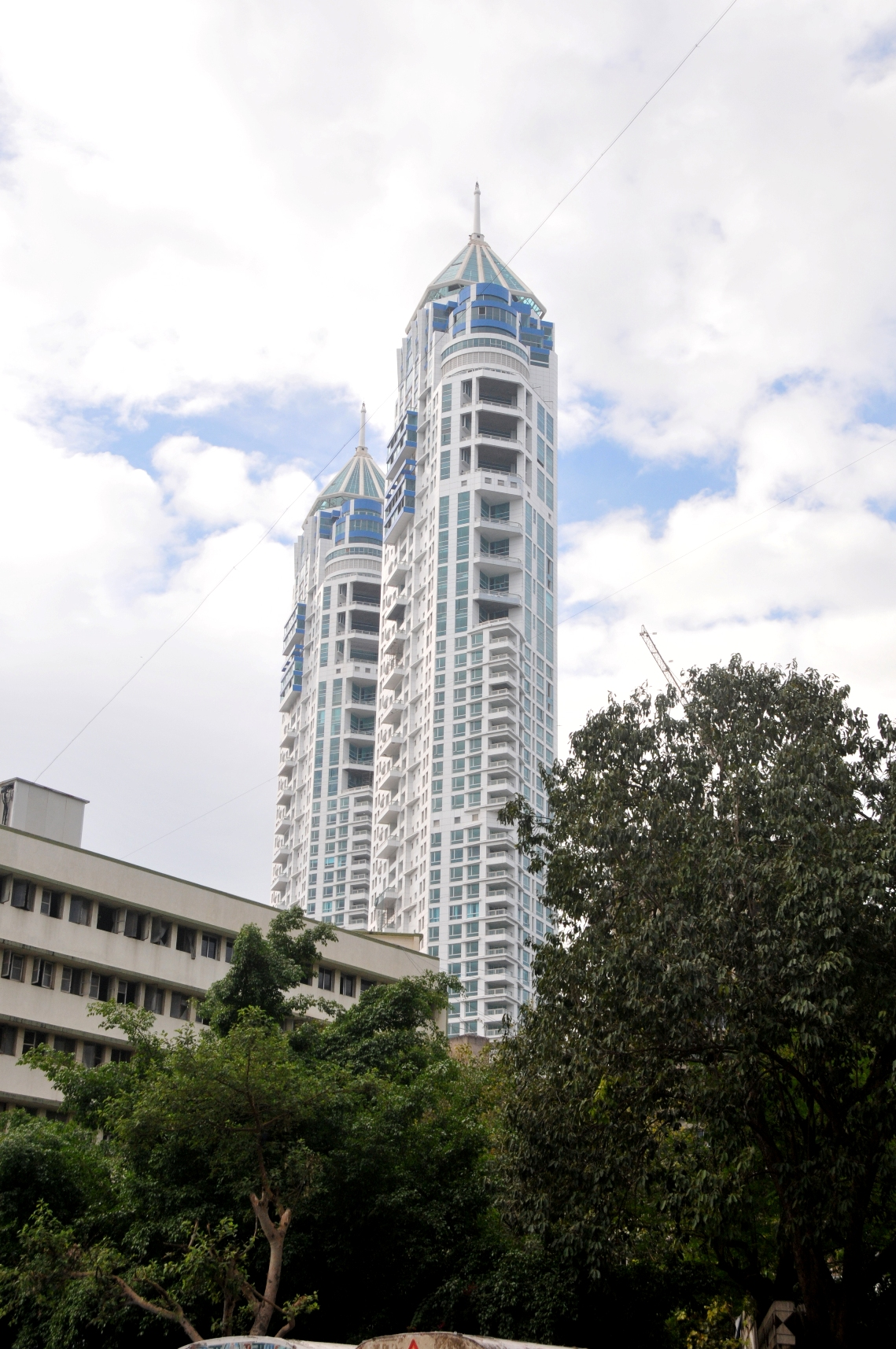
- Interactive map of the The Imperial area

Record height
- Tallest in India from 2010 to 2019^{[I]}
- Preceded by: Planet Godrej

General information
- Type: Residential Condominiums
- Location: Balkrishna Nakashe Marg, Tardeo, Mumbai, India, Altamount Road & Tardeo Road
- Coordinates: 18.9709°N 72.8129°E
- Construction started: 2005
- Completed: 2010
- Owner: S D Corporation Pvt. Ltd.
- Operator: S.D. Corporation Pvt. Ltd & The Imperial Club by Leela Hotels

Height
- Antenna spire: 256 m (840 ft)
- Roof: 210 m (690 ft)

Technical details
- Floor count: 2 x 60
- Floor area: 2 x 120,000 m^{2} (1,300,000 sq ft)
- Lifts/elevators: 17

Design and construction
- Architect: Hafeez Contractor
- Developer: Shapoorji Pallonji & Co Ltd
- Structural engineer: J+W Consultants; CBM Engineers
- Main contractor: Shapoorji Pallonji & Co Ltd

Website
- https://sdcorp.in/the-imperial.html

The Imperial is a modernist style twin-tower skyscraper complex in the billionaires row of Mumbai, India. It was the tallest skyscraper in India from 2010 to 2019 when it was overtaken by Lodha Park which was again overtaken by Palais Royale Mumbai. It has been home to several high-net-worth individuals. It is currently the 19th tallest building in India.

== Location ==
Designed by architect Hafeez Contractor, The Imperial is built in Tardeo, South Mumbai and is perhaps contractor's most recognisable project to date. The project's use of the modern urban redevelopment model in which the building firm provides free land and rehabilitation to slum dwellers in exchange for rights for property development was the first implementation of this model on a large scale.

== See also ==
- List of tallest buildings in Mumbai
- List of tallest buildings in India
