= World Trade Centre, Mumbai =

Skyscraper in India

MVIRDC
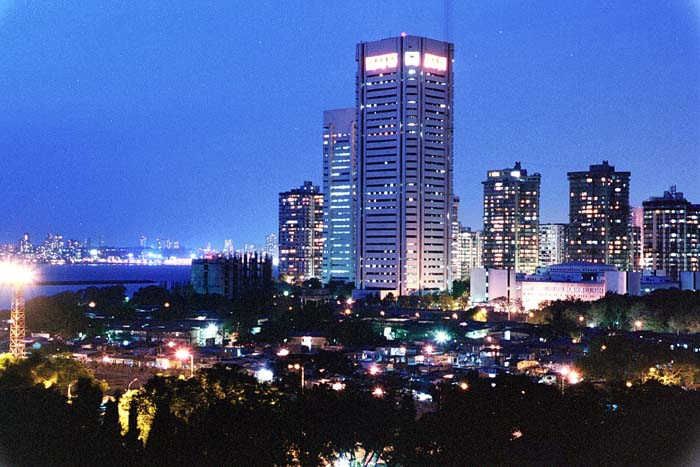
- Interactive map of MVIRDC

Record height
- Tallest in India from 1970 to 2009^{[I]}
- Preceded by: Usha Kiran
- Surpassed by: Planet Godrej

General information
- Type: Commercial
- Location: Mumbai, Maharashtra, India
- Coordinates: 18.9145°N 72.8179°E
- Completed: 1970

Height
- Roof: 155.9 m (511 ft)

Technical details
- Floor count: 35

The Mumbai World Trade Centre at Cuffe Parade is a skyscraper built in the year 1970. It is the first world trade center in India. It consists of two towers, the M. Visvesaraya Industrial Research and Development Centre (MVIRDC) and the IDBI. MVIRDC is also known as Centre 1. At 155.9 m, the MVIRDC tower was the tallest building in South Asia for nearly four decades, until the completion of Planet Godrej (181 m) in 2009. It was constructed by the Shapoorji Pallonji Group.

In 1998, the Brihanmumbai Electricity Supply and Transport (BEST) commenced air-conditioned bus services connecting the World Trade Centre with the suburb of Andheri. Furthermore, two special buses also plied between Mumbai CSMT and the World Trade Center.

== History ==
The idea of MVIRDC World Trade Center was first conceived by Mokshagundam Visvesvaraya, who envisioned an international trade promotion and industrial research centre in the country. The land on which the WTC stands was originally allotted in 1970 to M. Visvesvaraya Industrial Research and Development Centre (MVIRDC). The MVIRDC then affiliated itself (i.e., sub-leased the land) to World Trade Center, New York.

Part of the land was taken back by the Maharashtra government in 1976, leaving 46,000 square meters. In 2016, the state government took back the remaining land citing "grave violations" of terms set by the government.

In 2023, the MVIRDC World Trade Center was granted the premier accreditation from the World Trade Centers Association (WTCA), New York "for providing and setting up highest standards" of various kinds of business-related services.

== See also ==
- List of world trade centers
- List of tallest buildings in Mumbai
- List of tallest buildings in India
- List of tallest buildings and structures in the Indian subcontinent
- List of tallest twin buildings and structures
