= Kanjur Marg =

Kanjur marg Kanjur Gaav Kanjurmarg Village
- Suburb
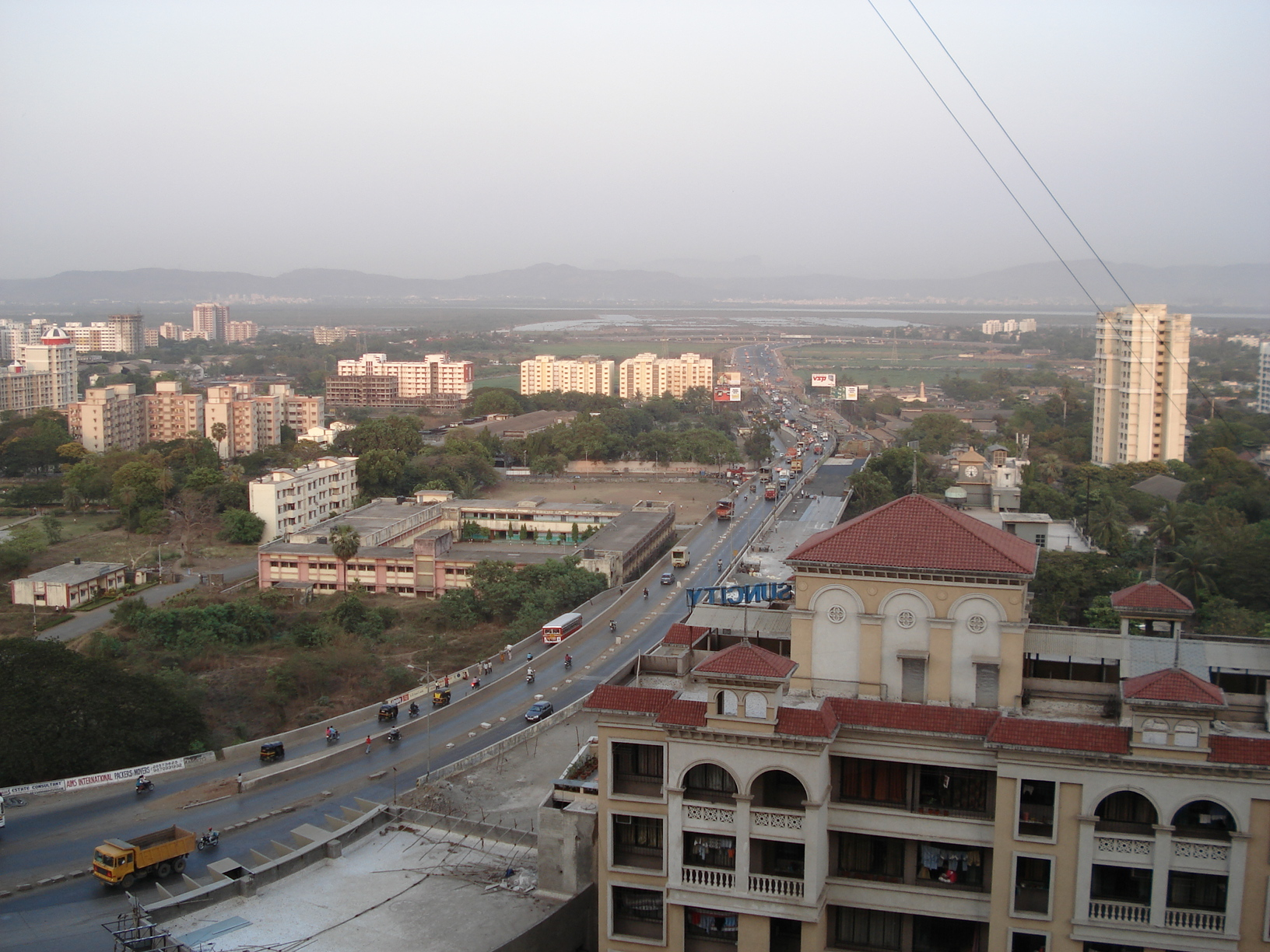
- Jogeshwari - Vikhroli Link Road at Kanjur

- Location within Mumbai
- Coordinates: 19.13°N 72.94°E
- Country: India
- State: Maharashtra
- District: Mumbai Suburban
- City: Mumbai

Government
  - Type: Municipal Corporation
  - Body: Brihanmumbai Municipal Corporation (MCGM)

Languages
  - Official: Marathi
- Time zone: UTC+5:30 (IST)
- PIN: 400042 for East & 400078 for West
- Area code: 022
- Vehicle registration: MH03

Kanjur Marg (Marathi pronunciation: [kaɲd͡zuɾmaːɾɡ]) is a suburb in east central Mumbai. Kanjurmarg railway station is the main access point for IIT Bombay, IIM Mumbai, KV Powai, Maharashtra National Law University, Mumbai, L&T, Hiranandani Gardens and other locations in Powai. The station was built in 1968 and named after the local Kanjur village.

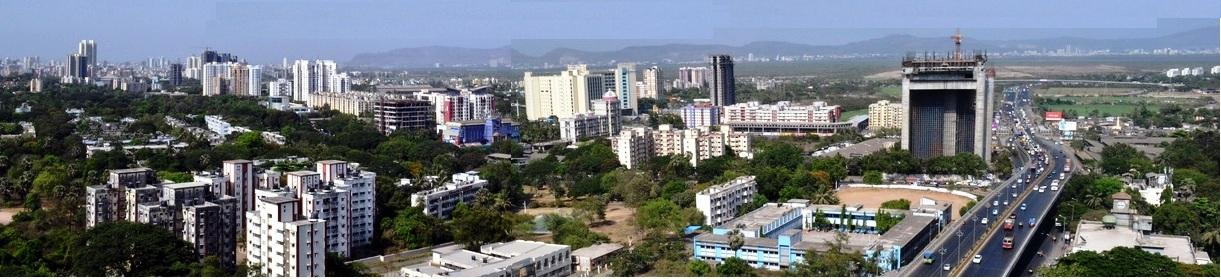
Kanjur Marg
