= Nana Chowk =

- Neighbourhood
- Location within Mumbai
- Coordinates: 18°57′42″N 72°48′47″E
- Country: India
- State: Maharashtra
- District: Mumbai City
- City: Mumbai

Government
  - Type: Municipal Corporation
  - Body: Brihanmumbai Municipal Corporation (MCGM)

Languages
  - Official: Marathi
- Time zone: UTC+5:30 (IST)
- PIN: 400007
- Area code: 022
- Civic agency: BMC

Nana Chowk is a neighbourhood located in the Grant Road area of South Mumbai, Maharashtra. It is located in a close proximity to Tardeo, an important neighbourhood in South Mumbai. It is named after Jagannath 'Nana' Shankarsheth.

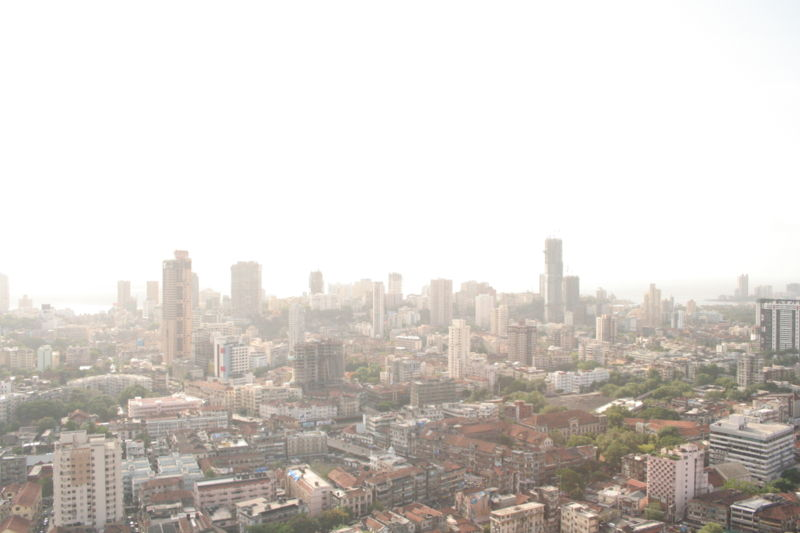
Nana Chowk on the left to Tardeo on the right

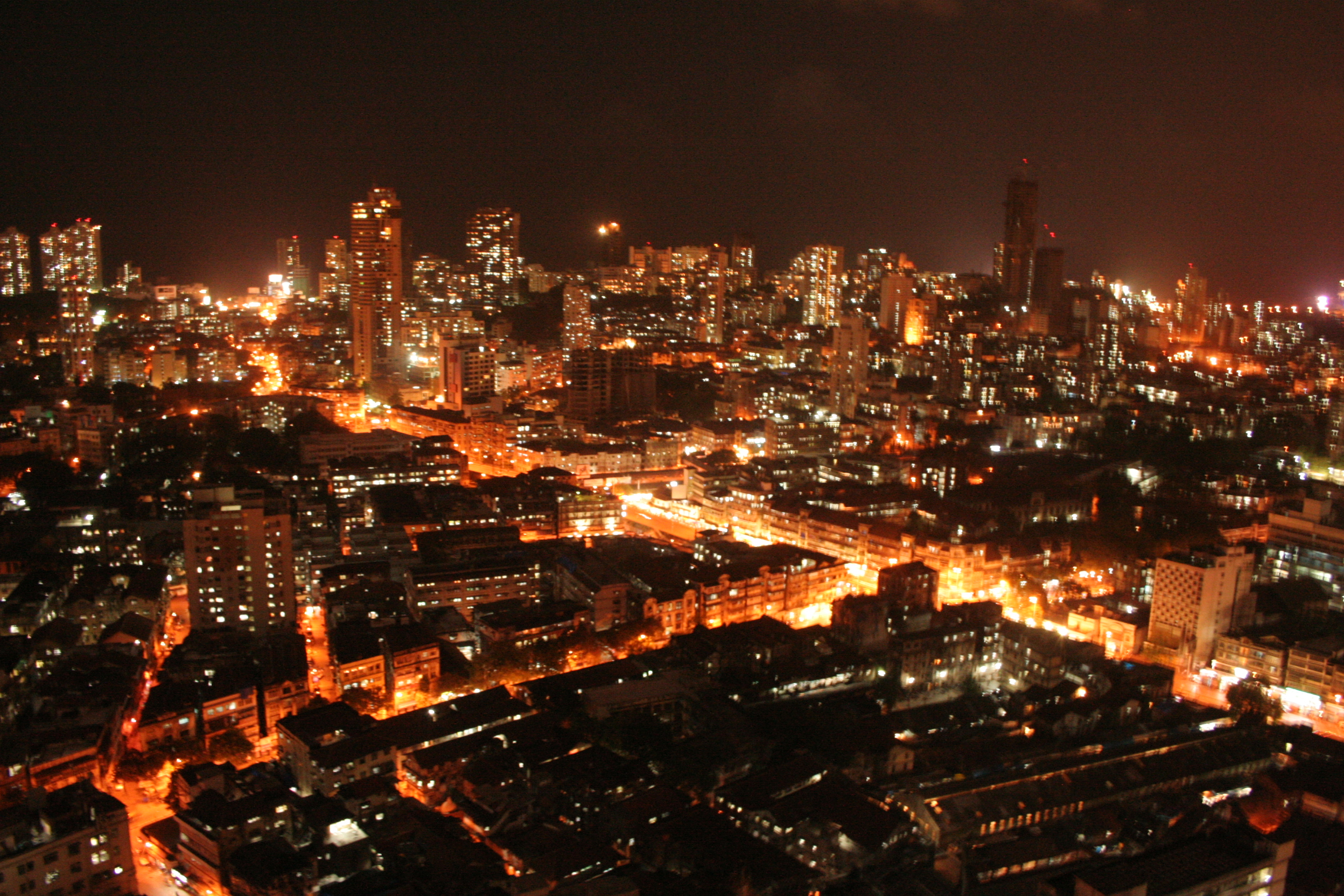
Nana Chowk on the left to Tardeo on the right at night
