= Tardeo =

Tardeo ताडदेव
- Neighbourhood
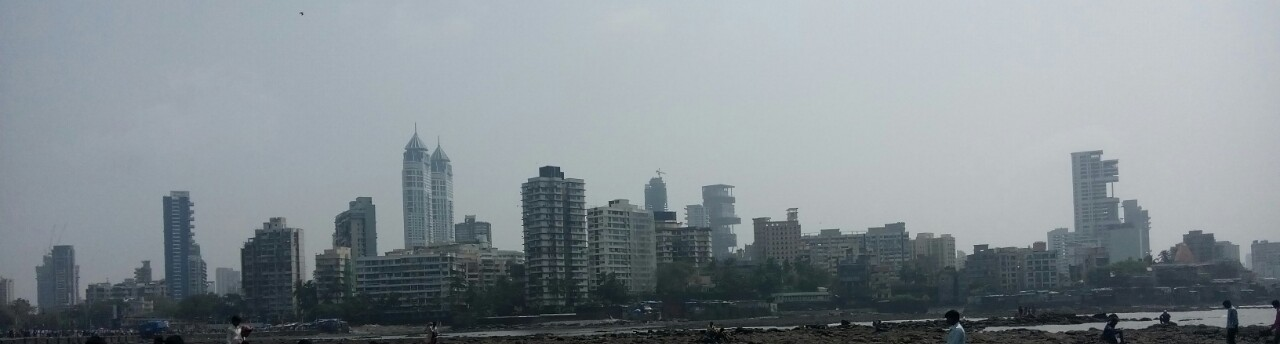
- Tardeo from Haji Ali Dargah

- Location within Mumbai
- Coordinates: 18.969°N 72.813°E
- Country: India
- State: Maharashtra
- Metro: Mumbai

Languages
  - Official: Marathi
- Time zone: UTC+5:30 (IST)
- Vehicle registration: MH-01

Tardeo or Tardeo Road (IPA: [t̪aːɽd̪eːʋ]) is an elite residential and commercial locality of South Mumbai, from Nana Chowk to Haji Ali Junction.

It lies 23 kilometres (14 miles) from the Chhatrapati Shivaji International Airport. It is connected by railway through the Mumbai Central railway station as well as by buses operated by BEST, MSRTC, and NMMT.

The Imperial Towers, for a period of time India's tallest, are located in Tardeo.
