= List of tallest buildings in South Asia =

This list of tallest buildings and structures in South Asia ranks skyscrapers and structures in South Asia, which includes the countries of Afghanistan, Bangladesh, Bhutan, India, Maldives, Nepal, Pakistan, and Sri Lanka by height.

== Tallest buildings ==
This list ranks completed and topped out buildings in South Asia that are at least 200 m (660 ft) tall. Only completed buildings and under construction buildings that have topped out are included. This includes spires and architectural details but does not include antenna masts.

Was the tallest building in South Asia upon completion

List of tallest buildings in South Asia
Rank	Name	City	Country	Image	Height	Floors	Year	Building type
1	Lokhandwala Minerva	Mumbai	India		301 metres (988 ft)	78	2023	Residential
2	Bahria Icon Tower	Karachi	Pakistan		300 metres (984 ft)	62	2021	Mixed Use
3	Palais Royale	Mumbai	India		297.50 metres (976 ft)	84	2026	Residential
4	Piramal Aranya Arav	Mumbai	India		282.2 metres (926 ft)	83	2022	Residential
5	World One	Mumbai	India		280.2 metres (919 ft)	76	2020	Residential
6	World View	Mumbai	India		277.6 metres (911 ft)	73	2020	Residential
7	Lodha Trump Tower	Mumbai	India		268 metres (879 ft)	76	2021	Residential
7	Lodha Marquise	Mumbai	India		268 metres (879 ft)	76	2021	Residential
7	Lodha Kiara	Mumbai	India		268 metres (879 ft)	76	2021	Residential
7	Lodha Allura	Mumbai	India		268 metres (879 ft)	76	2021	Residential
7	Lodha Parkside	Mumbai	India		268 metres (879 ft)	76	2021	Residential
12	Piramal Mahalaxmi North Tower	Mumbai	India		267.6 metres (878 ft)	77	2025	Residential
13	Omkar 1973 Tower A	Mumbai	India		267 metres (876 ft)	73	2020	Residential
13	Omkar 1973 Tower B	Mumbai	India		267 metres (876 ft)	73	2020	Residential
15	Nathani Heights	Mumbai	India		262 metres (860 ft)	72	2020	Residential
16	Three Sixty West Tower B	Mumbai	India		260 metres (853 ft)	66	2020	Commercial
16	The 42	Kolkata	India		260 metres (853 ft)	65	2019	Residential
16	One Avighna Park	Mumbai	India		260 metres (853 ft)	64	2017	Residential
19	Rustomjee Crown Tower A	Mumbai	India		259 metres (850 ft)	72	2022	Residential
19	Rustomjee Crown Tower B	Mumbai	India		259 metres (850 ft)	68	2022	Residential
21	Imperial Tower 1	Mumbai	India		256 metres (840 ft)	60	2010	Residential
21	Imperial Tower 2	Mumbai	India		256 metres (840 ft)	60	2010	Residential
23	Three Sixty West Tower A	Mumbai	India		255.6 metres (839 ft)	55	2020	Commercial
24	Four Seasons Private Residences	Mumbai	India		250 metres (820 ft)	55	2022	Residential
25	Ahuja Tower	Mumbai	India		250 metres (820 ft)	53	2015	Residential
26	Altair: Straight Tower	Colombo	Sri Lanka		240 metres (787 ft)	68	2017	Residential
27	Indiabulls Sky	Mumbai	India		240 metres (787 ft)	48	2016	Residential
28	L&T Crescent Bay 6	Mumbai	India		239.7 metres (786 ft)	62	2019	Residential
29	SAS Crown Tower 1	Hyderabad	India		235.4 metres (772 ft)	58	2025	Residential
29	SAS Crown Tower 2	Hyderabad	India		235.4 metres (772 ft)	58	2025	Residential
29	SAS Crown Tower 3	Hyderabad	India		235.4 metres (772 ft)	58	2025	Residential
32	Auris Serenity 1	Mumbai	India		235 metres (771 ft)	69	2021	Residential
32	Auris Serenity 2	Mumbai	India		235 metres (771 ft)	69	2021	Residential
32	Auris Serenity 3	Mumbai	India		235 metres (771 ft)	69	2021	Residential
35	Grand Hyatt Colombo	Colombo	Sri Lanka		229.5 metres (753 ft)	47	2015	Mixed Use
36	ITC Ratnadipa	Colombo	Sri Lanka		225.5 meters (740 ft)	55	2024	Residential
37	Oberoi Commerz	Mumbai	India		225.5 metres (740 ft)	51	2023	Commercial
38	Salsette 27 Tower A	Mumbai	India		225.2 metres (739 ft)	64	2023	Residential
38	Salsette 27 Tower B	Mumbai	India		225.2 metres (739 ft)	64	2023	Residential
40	Indiabulls Sky Forest Tower 1	Mumbai	India		225 metres (738 ft)	62	2022	Residential
41	Indiabulls Sky Forest Tower 2	Mumbai	India		225 metres (738 ft)	62	2022	Residential
42	Two ICC Mumbai	Mumbai	India		223.2 metres (732 ft)	68	2019	Residential
43	World Crest	Mumbai	India		222.5 metres (730 ft)	57	2014	Residential
44	L&T Crescent Bay 5	Mumbai	India		222.5 metres (730 ft)	63	2019	Residential
45	Century Mills Tower	Mumbai	India		222 metres (728 ft)	51	2014	Commercial
46	Lodha Bellissimo A & B	Mumbai	India		222 metres (728 ft)	53	2012	Residential
46	Lodha Bellissimo C	Mumbai	India		222 metres (728 ft)	53	2012	Residential
48	Oberoi Sky City A	Mumbai	India		220 metres (722 ft)	67	2021	Residential
48	Oberoi Sky City B	Mumbai	India		220 metres (722 ft)	67	2021	Residential
48	Oberoi Sky City C	Mumbai	India		220 metres (722 ft)	67	2021	Residential
48	Oberoi Sky City D	Mumbai	India		220 metres (722 ft)	67	2021	Residential
48	Oberoi Sky City E	Mumbai	India		220 metres (722 ft)	67	2020	Residential
53	Adhiraj Samyama	Navi Mumbai	India		220 metres (722 ft)	55	2021	Residential
54	Omkar Altamonte Tower C	Mumbai	India		218 metres (715 ft)	63	2021	Residential
55	Piramal Mahalaxmi Central Tower	Mumbai	India		215.76 metres (708 ft)	60	2025	Residential
56	Raheja Imperia	Mumbai	India		214 metres (702 ft)	52	2021	Residential
57	Cyberthum Tower A	Noida	India		213.7 metres (701 ft)	50	2024	Residential
58	Cyberthum Tower B	Noida	India		213.7 metres (701 ft)	50	2024	Residential
59	Lodha Venezia A	Mumbai	India		213.5 metres (700 ft)	57	2017	Residential
59	Lodha Venezia B	Mumbai	India		213.5 metres (700 ft)	57	2019	Residential
61	Piramal Mahalaxmi South Tower	Mumbai	India		213.4 metres (700 ft)	59	2025	Residential
62	Indiabulls Sky Blu	Mumbai	India		213 metres (699 ft)	56	2019	Commercial
63	Monte South Tower 1	Mumbai	India		210 metres (689 ft)	60	2022	Residential
64	Chapal Skymark	Karachi	Pakistan		210 metres (689 ft)	50	2019	Residential
65	Orchid Enclave 1	Mumbai	India		210 metres (689 ft)	52	2013	Residential
65	Orchid Enclave 2	Mumbai	India		210 metres (689 ft)	52	2013	Residential
65	L&T Crescent Bay 3	Mumbai	India		210 metres (689 ft)	54	2017	Residential
68	Altair: Leaning Tower	Colombo	Sri Lanka		209 metres (686 ft)	63	2017	Residential
69	The Amaryllis Iconic Tower	Delhi	India		208 metres (682 ft)	49	2025	Residential
70	Kohinoor Square	Mumbai	India		203 metres (666 ft)	52	2013	Commercial
71	Ajmera Zeon Tower A	Mumbai	India		202 metres (663 ft)	55	2016	Residential
71	Ajmera Zeon Tower B	Mumbai	India		202 metres (663 ft)	55	2016	Residential
73	Trump Towers Delhi NCR Tower 1	Gurugram	India		201.53 metres (661 ft)	55	2024	Commercial
73	Trump Towers Delhi NCR Tower 2	Gurugram	India		201.53 metres (661 ft)	55	2024	Commercial
75	Celestia Spaces Tower A	Mumbai	India		201 metres (659 ft)	59	2022	Residential
75	Celestia Spaces Tower B	Mumbai	India		201 metres (659 ft)	59	2022	Residential
77	Lodha Primero	Mumbai	India		201 metres (659 ft)	52	2014	Residential
77	Kalpataru Avana	Mumbai	India		201 metres (659 ft)	52	2021	Residential
79	One ICC Mumbai	Mumbai	India		200 metres (656 ft)	60	2018	Residential

== Tallest structures ==
This is a list of the tallest structures in South Asia, including all types of structures that stand at least 300 metres tall.

Name	Country	Image	Pinnacle height	Year	Structure type	Place	Notes
INS Kattabomman, large masts	India		471 metres (1,545 ft)	2013	Guyed mast	Tirunelveli, Tamil Nadu	Tallest structure in South Asia. Tallest military structure in the world.
Lotus Tower	Sri Lanka		356 metres (1,168 ft)	2019	Concrete	Colombo, Sri Lanka	Tallest self-supported structure in South Asia.
Rameswaram TV Tower	India		323 metres (1,060 ft)	1995	Concrete	Rameswaram, Tamil Nadu	
Fazilka TV Tower	India		305 metres (1,001 ft)	2007	Lattice tower	Fazilka, Punjab	
INS Kattabomman, central mast	India		301 metres (988 ft)	1989	Guyed mast	Tirunelveli, Tamil Nadu	
Mumbai Television Tower	India		300 metres (984 ft)		Lattice tower	Mumbai, Maharashtra	
Jaisalmer TV Tower	India		300 metres (984 ft)	1993	Concrete	Jaisalmer, Rajasthan	
Samatra TV Tower	India		300 metres (984 ft)	1999	Concrete	Samatra, Gujarat	

- South of INS Kattabomman, there are two radio masts with an umbrella antenna situated at 8.378479 N 77.744043 E and 8.375069 N 77.755834 E.

== Tallest city ==
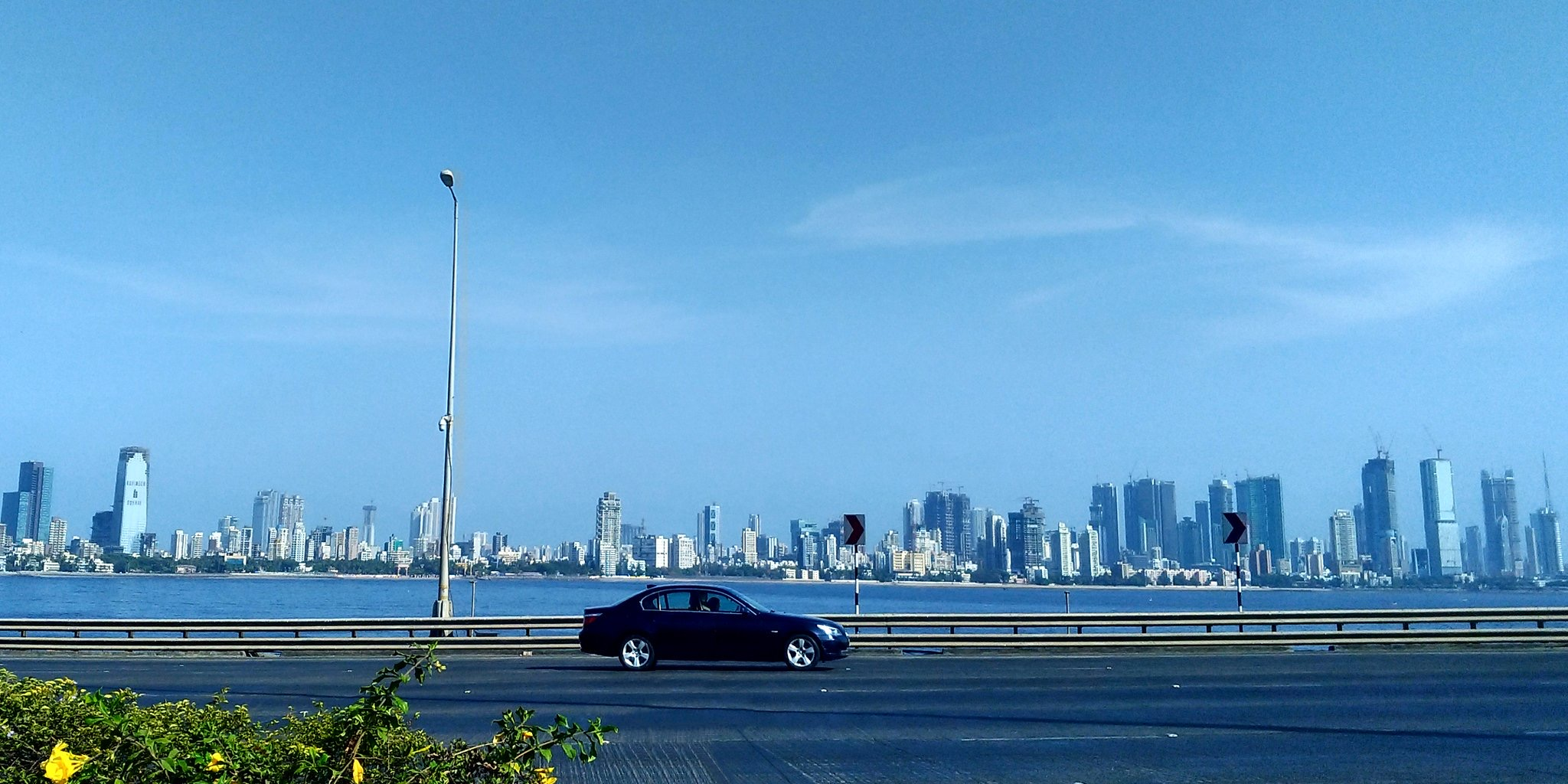
Skyline of Mumbai.

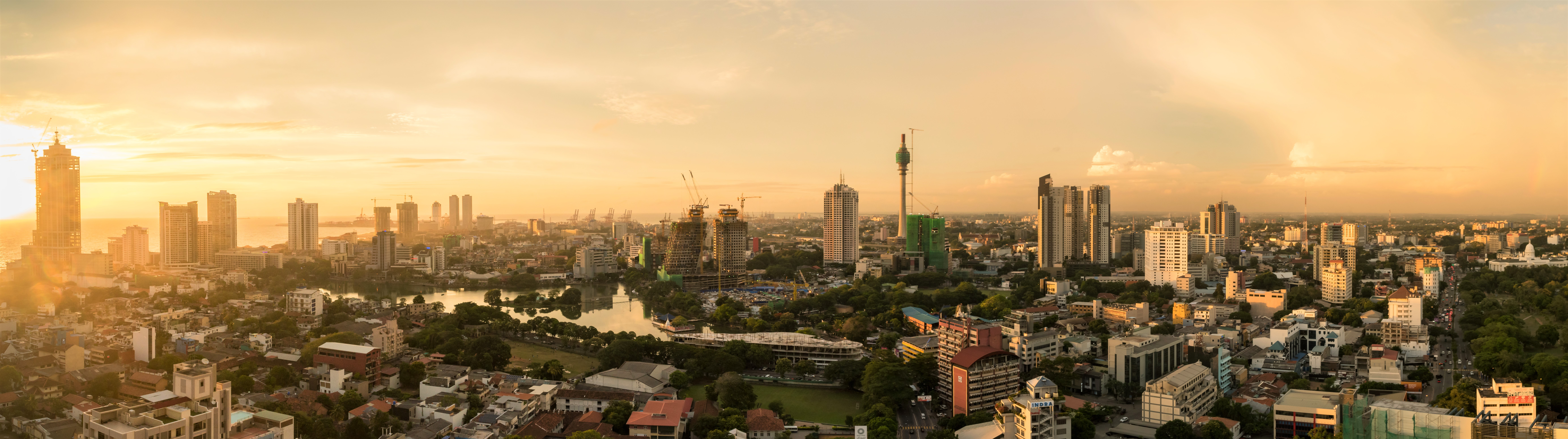
Skyline of Colombo.

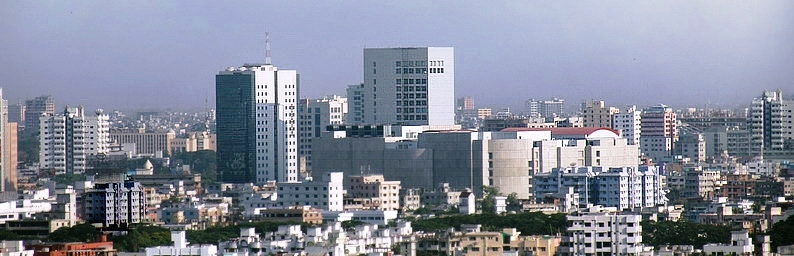
Skyline of Dhaka

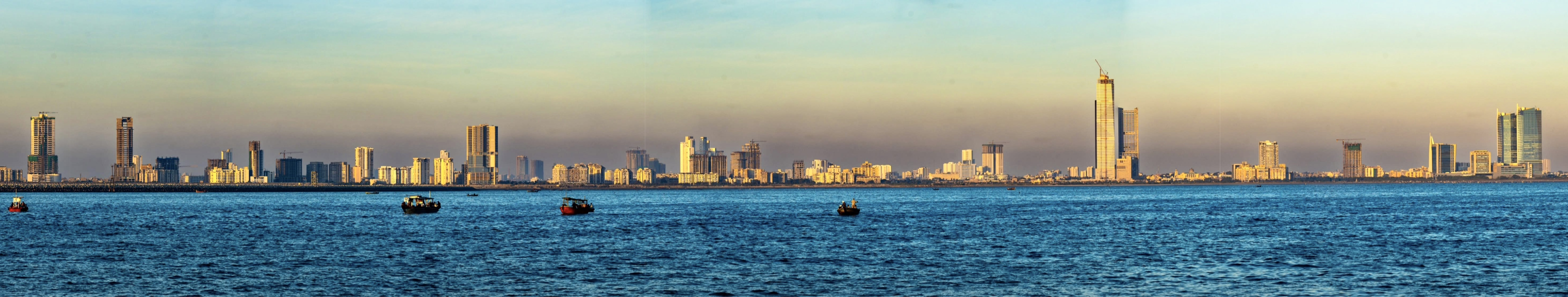
Skyline of Karachi

This is a list of cities in South Asia by their number of high-rise buildings and skyscrapers.

	City	Country	Skyline	100m+	200m+	300m+	Total High-Rises
1	Mumbai	India		496	78	1	3,900
2	Hyderabad	India		260	3	0	1,896
3	Gurgaon	India		138	2	0	1,724
4	Bangalore	India		92	0	0	1,500
5	Navi Mumbai	India		61	3	0	1,127
6	Surat	India		0	0	0	1,107
7	Noida	India		103	3	1	1,054
8	Greater Noida	India		29	0	0	823
9	Thane	India		110	0	0	800
10	Pune	India		8	0	0	774
11	Kolkata	India		68	1	0	762
12	Dhaka	Bangladesh		9	0	0	748
13	Chennai	India		39	0	0	632
14	Ghaziabad	India		10	0	0	493
15	Kochi	India		3	0	0	486
16	Karachi	Pakistan		50	2	0	459
17	Faridabad	India		2	0	0	228
18	Colombo	Sri Lanka		32	4	1	196
19	Ahmedabad	India		5	0	0	118

== Tallest buildings under construction ==
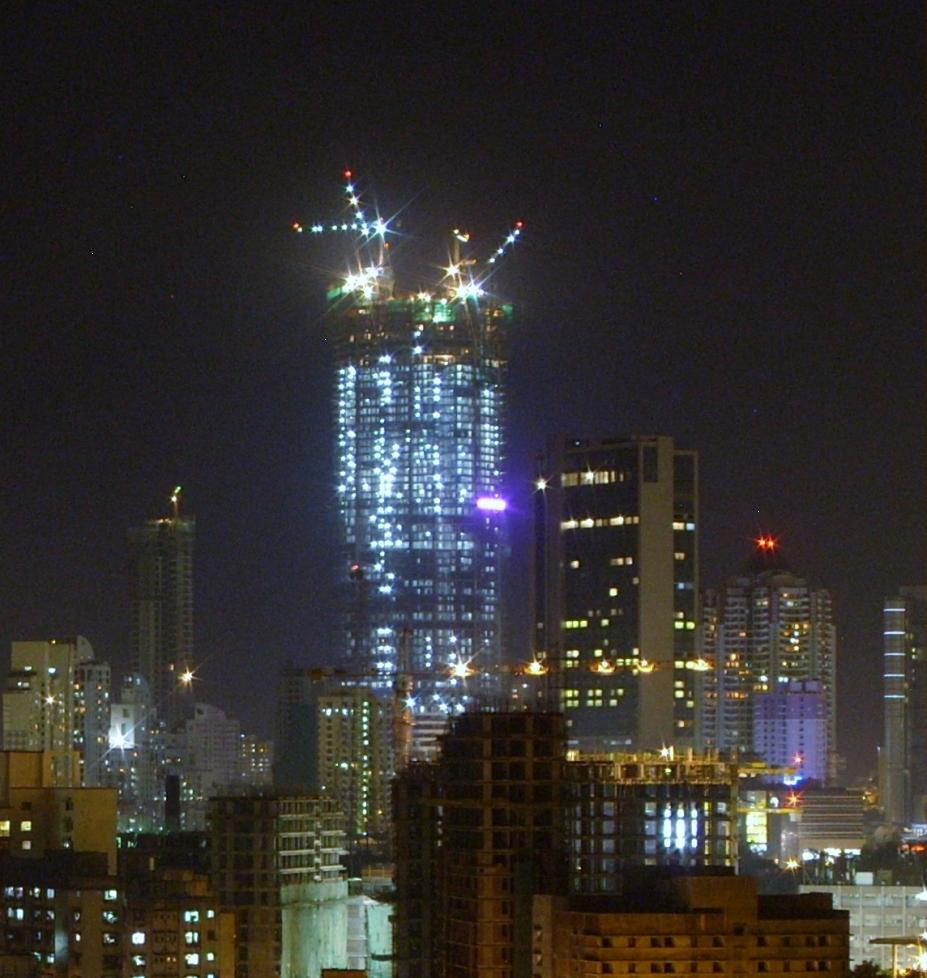
Palais Royale, South Asia's first supertall under construction

This list ranks buildings that are under construction in South Asia and are planned to rise at least 200 m (660 ft) or 60 floors.

Name	Country	Locale	Height	Floors	Expected year of completion
Joyus Housing Tower	India	Mumbai	486 metres (1,594 ft)	125	2030
Diamond Tower	India	Gandhinagar (GIFT City)	410 metres (1,329 ft)	87	2028
Shreepati Garden Tower 1	India	Mumbai	400 metres (1,312 ft)	110	2027
Shreepati Garden Tower 2	India	Mumbai	400 metres (1,312 ft)	110	2027
The Imperial 3	India	Mumbai	396 metres (1,299 ft)	116	2025
The One: The One Tower	Sri Lanka	Colombo	376 metres (1234 ft)	92	2023
Gateway Towers 1	India	Gandhinagar (GIFT City)	362 meters (1,188 ft)	70	2027
Gateway Towers 2	India	Gandhinagar (GIFT City)	362 meters (1,188 ft)	70	2027
Ocean Towers 1	India	Mumbai	331 metres (1,086 ft)	74	2027
The One: Ritz Carlton Tower and Residences	Sri Lanka	Colombo	326 metres (1,070 ft)	80	2025
Ocean Towers 2	India	Mumbai	310 metres (1,017 ft)	66	2027
Aaradhya Avaan 1	India	Mumbai	307 metres (1,007 ft)	80	2028
Sky Link Tower 1	India	Mumbai	301 metres (988 ft)	85	On hold
Sky Link Tower 2	India	Mumbai	301 metres (988 ft)	85	On hold
Aaradhya Avaan 2	India	Mumbai	295 metres (968 ft)	77	2028
The One: JW Marriott	Sri Lanka	Colombo	291 metres (955 ft)	77	2023
Jolshiri Twin Towers - Tower 1	Bangladesh	Dhaka	250 metres (820 ft)	65	N/A
Jolshiri Twin Towers - Tower 2	Bangladesh	Dhaka	250 metres (820 ft)	65	N/A
Omkar Alta Monte Tower D	India	Mumbai	290 metres (951 ft)	73	2019
Omkar 1973 Tower C	India	Mumbai	267 metres (876 ft)	73	2019
North Eye	India	Noida	255 metres (837 ft)	55	2026
Mabarak Center 1	Pakistan	Lahore	250 metres (820 ft)	60	2019
Artesia	India	Mumbai	227 metres (745 ft)	49	2019
Richa Park Marina	India	Mumbai	227 metres (745 ft)	62	2019
Island City Centre 1	India	Mumbai	227 metres (745 ft)	67	2019
Kalpataru Avana Tower B	India	Mumbai	225 metres (738 ft)	74	2019
ITC Colombo One	Sri Lanka	Colombo	225 metres (738 ft)	55	2021
St. Regis	India	Noida	220 metres (722 ft)	57	2018
Vrindavan Chandrodaya Mandir	India	Mathura	213.4 metres (700 ft)	70	2028
606 The Address: Residential Tower	Sri Lanka	Colombo	213 metres (700 ft)	63	2021
Four Seasons Private Residences & Apartment Tower 2	India	Mumbai	210 metres (689 ft)	51	2020
RNA Metropolis 1	India	Mumbai	210 metres (689 ft)	67	2020
RNA Metropolis 2	India	Mumbai	210 metres (689 ft)	67	2020
Kalpataru Avana Tower C	India	Mumbai	210 metres (689 ft)	74	2019
Orbit Terraces	India	Mumbai	207 metres (679 ft)	61	2017
Discovery Offices	India	Mumbai	205 metres (673 ft)	50	2018
Shana Sion Tower A	India	Mumbai	205 metres (673 ft)	60	2020
Shana Sion Tower B	India	Mumbai	205 metres (673 ft)	60	2020
Shana Sion Tower C	India	Mumbai	205 metres (673 ft)	60	2020
SD Epsilon Tower A	India	Mumbai	205 metres (673 ft)	64	2020
SD Epsilon Tower B	India	Mumbai	205 metres (673 ft)	64	2020
SD Epsilon Tower C	India	Mumbai	205 metres (673 ft)	64	2020
SD Astron Tower A	India	Mumbai	205 metres (673 ft)	64	2020
SD Astron Tower B	India	Mumbai	205 metres (673 ft)	64	2020
SD Astron Tower C	India	Mumbai	205 metres (673 ft)	64	2020
The Imperial Edge	India	Mumbai	204 metres (669 ft)	50	2019
Orchid Heights 2	India	Mumbai	201 metres (659 ft)	55	2017
Palmyra Air Tower	Pakistan	Karachi	200 metres (656 ft)	50	2019
Frere Heights	Pakistan	Karachi	200 metres (656 ft)	49	2019
Mabarak Center 2	Pakistan	Lahore	200 metres (656 ft)	45	2019
Mabarak Center 3	Pakistan	Lahore	200 metres (656 ft)	45	2019
Mabarak Center 4	Pakistan	Lahore	200 metres (656 ft)	45	2019
Indiabulls Blu 3	India	Mumbai	200 metres (656 ft)	46	2018
Oberoi Eternia A	India	Mumbai	200 metres (656 ft)	67	2019
Oberoi Eternia B	India	Mumbai	200 metres (656 ft)	67	2019
Oberoi Eternia C	India	Mumbai	200 metres (656 ft)	67	2019
Oberoi Eternia D	India	Mumbai	200 metres (656 ft)	67	2019
Oberoi Enigma A	India	Mumbai	200 metres (656 ft)	67	2019
Oberoi Enigma B	India	Mumbai	200 metres (656 ft)	67	2019
Shana Ramtekdi Tower A	India	Mumbai	200 metres (656 ft)	50	2021
Shana Ramtekdi Tower B	India	Mumbai	200 metres (656 ft)	50	2021
Peninsula Salsette Tower A	India	Mumbai	200 metres (656 ft)	52	2021
Peninsula Salsette Tower B	India	Mumbai	200 metres (656 ft)	52	2021
OMG!	India	Noida	200 metres (656 ft)	66	2021
Island City Centre 2	India	Mumbai	200 metres (656 ft)	60	2019

== Timeline of tallest buildings ==
Name	Image	City	Country	Height	Floors	Years as tallest
LIC Building		Chennai	India	54 metres (177 ft)	15	1959-1960
Ceylinco House		Colombo	Sri Lanka	55 metres (180 ft)	15	1960-1961
Usha Kiran		Mumbai	India	86 metres (282 ft)	25	1961-1963
Habib Bank Plaza		Karachi	Pakistan	101 metres (331 ft)	25	1963–1970
World Trade Centre Mumbai		Mumbai	India	156 metres (512 ft)	35	1970–2009
Planet Godrej		Mumbai	India	181 metres (594 ft)	51	2009–2010
Imperial Towers		Mumbai	India	254 metres (833 ft)	60	2010–2017
Bahria Icon Tower		Karachi	Pakistan	273 metres (896 ft)	62	2017–2020
World One		Mumbai	India	280.2 metres (919 ft)	76	2020–2022
Piramal Aranya Arav		Mumbai	India	282.2 metres (926 ft)	83	2022–2023
Lokhandwala Minerva		Mumbai	India	301 metres (988 ft)	78	2023–present

== See also ==
- List of tallest buildings in Asia
- List of tallest buildings and structures in Afghanistan
- List of tallest buildings in Bangladesh
- List of tallest buildings in India
- List of tallest buildings in Pakistan
- List of tallest structures in Sri Lanka
