= ISE Tower =

- برج آئی ایس ای
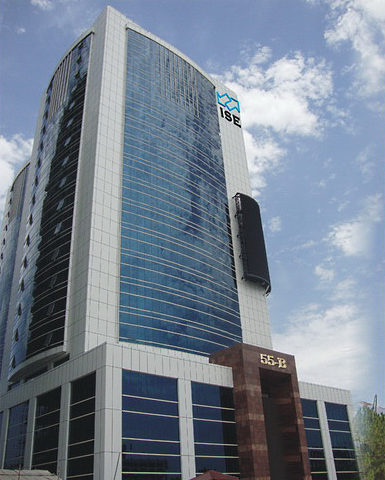

General information
- Type: Office
- Location: Islamabad-44000, Pakistan
- Coordinates: 33.7119°N 73.0578°E
- Completed: 2009

Height
- Roof: 76 m (249 ft)

Technical details
- Floor count: 19

Website
- isereit.com.pk

The ISE Tower is a high-rise building located at 55, Jinnah Avenue of the Blue Area business district of Islamabad. The building was originally designed to serve as a stock exchange building. However, following the merger of the Islamabad Stock Exchange in 2016, the tower has been repurposed as an office building.

== History ==
Constructed at a cost of Rs 2.5 billion, the ISE management independently generated the necessary capital for the project, which was completed in under four years. It was inaugurated in 2009 by then-Prime Minister of Pakistan, Yusuf Raza Gilani.

== Building ==
The building features three basements, each spanning 4,650 m^{2} (50,000 sq ft), designated for employee parking. Despite the expectation of hundreds of daily visitors upon full occupancy, the planners did not allocate sufficient space for visitor parking. The main features of the 22-storey building include a bronze bull statue and the largest electronic screen in Pakistan, measuring 4.6 m (15 ft) high and 3.0 m (10 ft) wide.

Unlike other stock markets, the ISE Tower does not include a trading hall, as stock market trading is no longer centralized. To meet the high demand for telephone lines and internet connections, the PTCL has established a hub of 5,000 lines. The entire building is connected via optic fiber, with no copper wire internet connections, resulting in an additional cost of Rs 250 million. The state-of-the-art firefighting system installed in the building cost up to Rs300 million.

== Companies headquarters ==
- Air China Pakistan office
- British Airways Pakistan office at 11th Floor
- Etihad Airways Pakistan office
- OMV Pakistan office at 17th Floor
- ICBC Pakistan office
- NEC Worldwide (Pakistan) (Nippon Electric Company of Japan) (ground floor)
- Airblue (12th floor)
- MOL Pakistan (17th though 19th floor)
- Emirates Pakistan office
- Turkish Airlines Pakistan office

== See also ==
- Blue Area
- List of tallest buildings in Islamabad
- List of tallest buildings in Pakistan
