= Ocean Mall =

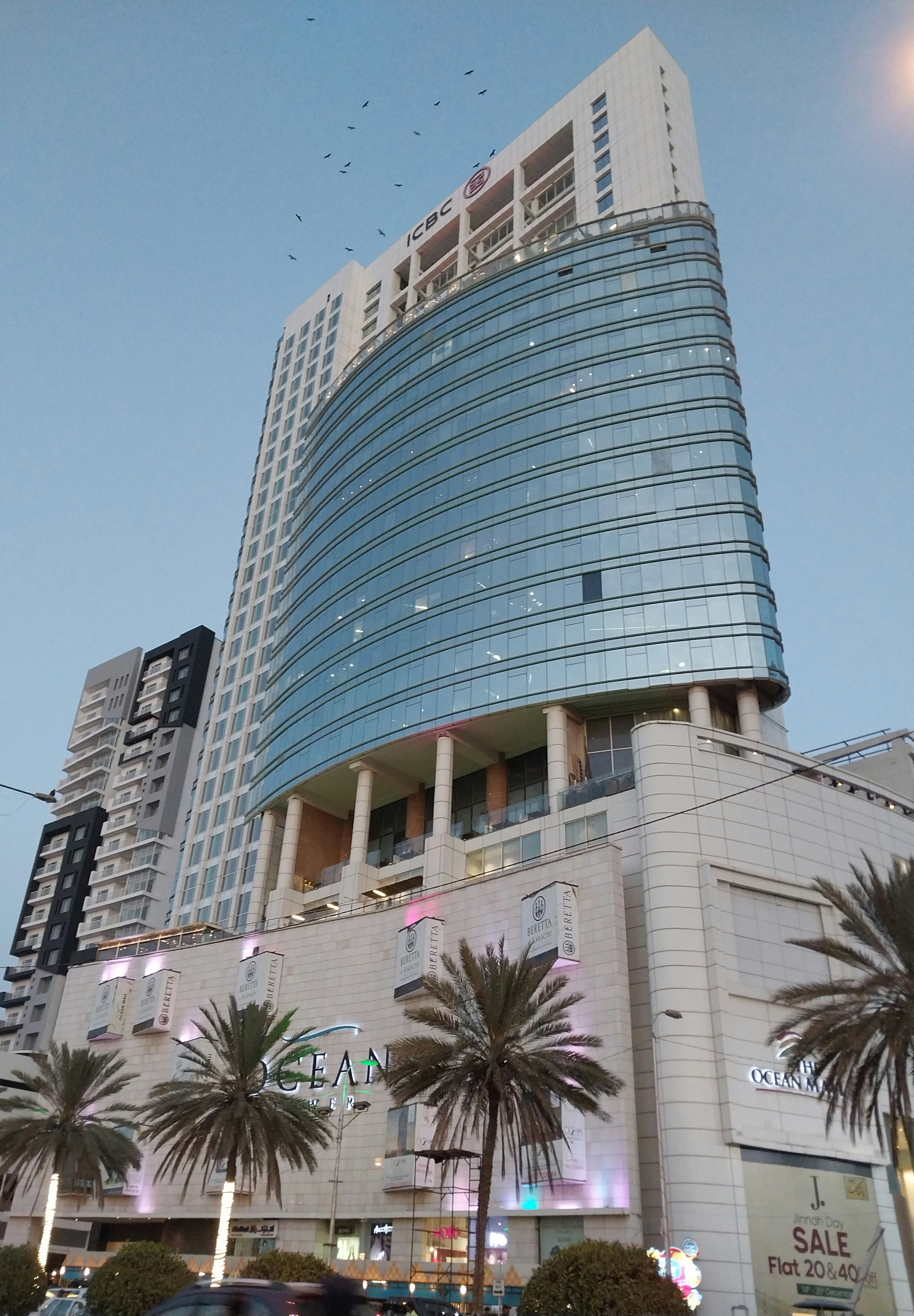

General information
- Type: Shopping mall, corporate offices
- Location: Karachi, Pakistan
- Coordinates: 24°49′26″N 67°02′08″E
- Construction started: 2007
- Cost: PKR 7 billion

Height
- Roof: 120 m

Technical details
- Floor count: 30

Design and construction
- Architect: Arcop Associates
- Structural engineer: Mushtaq & Bilal Consulting Engineers

Website
- www.oceantower.pk

Ocean Mall is a 120-metre-tall (393 ft) skyscraper in the Clifton locality of Karachi, Pakistan. It was built between 2009 and 2014, and contains a shopping mall and office spaces.

It was founded as an international hotel project for Sofitel, but was later abandoned due to the law and order situation in the city. Later, it was redesigned into a shopping mall and was named The Mall.

== Structural information ==
Ocean Tower is a 120-metre-high (393 ft) skyscraper in Karachi. It contains 28 storeys above ground, and 5 below ground. The project has its own 5-megawatt powerhouse, as compared to the 2 MW- and 1.2 MW-capacity powerhouses of MCB Tower and the Arif Habib Building respectively, and it does not rely on K-Electric for power. The tower uses state-of-the-art technology for monitoring heat and smoke. It has nine passenger lifts and five cargo lifts.

The surface area of the project is 79,000 square metres (850,000 sq ft). Construction cost is Rs. 5 billion. The project architect is arcop Private Limited.

== Child incident ==
On March 22, 2022 a three-year-old boy was injured after being stuck in an Ocean Mall escalator. According to the mother of the injured child, this incident happened when they were going from the second to the third floor of Ocean Mall. She further added that they kept calling the administration, but no one came to help, and even the buttons of the escalator were non-operational, and no medical assistance was provided. However, their management team took the child to the nearest hospital for medical assistance. They paid all medical expenses. As a result of the incident, a protest was staged outside the Mall, near Teen Talwar in the upscale Clifton neighborhood and there was severe public outrage over the incident on social media with a trend called #BanOceanMall.

== See also ==
- List of tallest buildings in Pakistan
- List of tallest buildings in Karachi
