= List of tallest buildings in Karachi =

Karachi is the largest city in Pakistan and the country's leading economic and financial centre. As of October 2025, the city is home to 50 skyscrapers (buildings at least 150 m (490 ft) tall), as well as hundreds of high-rises.

The tallest building in the city is the Bahria Icon Tower, which reaches a height of 300 m (980 ft).

Being the economical hub of Pakistan, Karachi hosts numerous buildings and structures of varied architectural styles. The downtown districts of Saddar and Clifton contain early 20th-century architecture, ranging in style from the neo-classical KPT building to the Sindh High Court Building. Karachi acquired its first neo-Gothic or Indo-Gothic buildings when Frere Hall, Empress Market and St. Patrick's Cathedral were completed. The Mock Tudor architectural style was introduced in the Karachi Gymkhana and the Boat Club. Neo-Renaissance architecture was popular in the 19th century and was the architectural style for St. Joseph's Convent (1870) and the Sind Club (1883). The classical style made a comeback in the late 19th century, as seen in Lady Dufferin Hospital (1898) and the Cantt. Railway Station.

Architecturally distinctive, even eccentric, buildings have sprung up throughout Karachi. Notable example of contemporary architecture include the Pakistan State Oil Headquarters building. The city has examples of modern Islamic architecture, including the Aga Khan University hospital, Grand Jamia Mosque, Masjid e Tooba, Faran Mosque, Baitul Mukarram Mosque, Quaid's Mausoleum, and the Textile Institute of Pakistan. One of the unique cultural elements of Karachi is that the residences, which are two- or three-story townhouses, are built with the front yard protected by a high brick wall. I. I. Chundrigar Road features a range of tall buildings. The most prominent examples include the Habib Bank Plaza, UBL Tower, PRC Towers, PNSC Building and MCB Tower.

An incomplete list of the tallest buildings in Karachi is available below:

== Skyscrapers taller than 70 m ==
Name	Height	Floors	Year	Location	Notes
Bahria Icon Tower	300 m (984 ft)	68	2021	Clifton	Pakistan's current tallest skyscraper, (2014-present).
Parsa City Club Towers	140 m (459 ft)	35	2025	Clifton	
Bahria Hotel Tower	230 m (755 ft)	45	2021	Clifton	
Chapal Skymark	210 m (689 ft)	50	2020	Civil Lines	
Emaar Panorama	140 m (459 ft)	50	2024	Crescent Bay	
Emaar The Views	125 m (410 ft)	45	2024	Crescent Bay	
Dolmen City Sky Tower - (West Wing)	175 m (574 ft)	42	2019	Clifton	
Dolmen City Sky Tower - (East Wing)	174.5 m (573 ft)	42	2019	Clifton	
Hoshang Pearl	160 m (525 ft)	35	stalled/dead	Civil Lines	
Country Infinity Tower	135 m (443 ft)	34	2025	Clifton	
KASB Altitude	150 m (492 ft)	38	stalled	Clifton	
Bakht Tower	145 m (476 ft)	38	2017	Clifton	
G.M Seaside Residency	143 m (469 ft)	34	2024	Clifton	
Arkadians Tower A	140 m (459 ft)	35	2017	DHA	
Luckyone Tower 1	138 m (453 ft)	42	2019	Federal B. Area	
Luckyone Tower 2	138 m (453 ft)	42	2019	Federal B. Area	
Luckyone Tower 3	138 m (453 ft)	42	2024	Federal B. Area	
Luckyone Tower 4	138 m (453 ft)	42	2024	Federal B. Area	
Grove Residency tower A	136 m (446 ft)	36	2024	DHA	
Marina View Tower	140 m (459 ft)	36	2022	Boat Basin	
H1 Tower	135 m (443 ft)	38	2025	DHA	
Clifton Icon	130 m (427 ft)	38	2025	Clifton	
Metro twin tower 1	130 m (427 ft)	32	2018	Clifton	
Metro twin tower 2	130 m (427 ft)	32	2018	Clifton	
Creek Marina Tower 4	130 m (427 ft)	32	2022	DHA	
Com-3 Tower 1	124 m (407 ft)	34	2018	Clifton	
Com-3 Tower 2	124 m (407 ft)	32	2018	Clifton	
Ocean Towers	120 m (394 ft)	30	2013	Clifton	Tallest in Pakistan, 2012–2014
Mega G4 Tower	118 m (387 ft)	30	2016	Clifton	First LEED-certified building in Pakistan
Centre Point Tower	117 m (384 ft)	29	2013	DHA	
MCB Tower	116 m (381 ft)	29	2005	Downtown	Tallest in Pakistan, 2005–2012
70 Riviera	110 m (361 ft)	32	2017	Clifton	
Signature 27	110 m (361 ft)	28	2022	DHA	
MPA Hostel Tower	109 m (358 ft)	31	2019	Downtown	
Pearl Tower 1	109 m (358 ft)	30	2019	Crescent Bay	
Pearl Tower 2	109 m (358 ft)	30	2019	Crescent Bay	
Reef Tower 1	108 m (354 ft)	30	2019	Crescent Bay	
Reef Tower 2	108 m (354 ft)	30	2019	Crescent Bay	
Reef Tower 3	108 m (354 ft)	30	2019	Crescent Bay	
Coral Tower 1	107 m (351 ft)	28	2018	Crescent Bay	
Coral Tower 2	107 m (351 ft)	28	2016	Crescent Bay	
A.Q Residency Tower 1	104 m (341 ft)	30	2022	Bahria Town	
A.Q Residency Tower 2	104 m (341 ft)	30	2022	Bahria Town	
A.Q Residency Tower 3	104 m (341 ft)	30	2022	Bahria Town	
Bahria Town Tower	102 m (335 ft)	26	2016	P.E.C.H.S (Tariq Road)	
Creek View Tower	102 m (335 ft)	25	2021	Clifton	
Habib Bank Plaza	102 m (335 ft)	24	1963	Downtown	Tallest in Asia, 1963–1970 and tallest in Pakistan, 1963-2005
UBL Tower	101 m (331 ft)	25	2016	Downtown	
Royal 8 Icon Tower 1	100 m (328 ft)	30	2009	Gulshan-e-Iqbal	
The Center (JS Tower)	100 m (328 ft)	30	2016	Downtown	
Mont Vista	100 m (328 ft)	26	2019	North Nazimabad	
Arkadians tower B	100 m (328 ft)	25	2018	DHA	
The Fusion	100 m (328 ft)	25	2022	Clifton	
Greens Three	100 m (328 ft)	25	2024	Clifton	
Country 8	80 m (262 ft)	25	2021	Clifton	
Sumya Sky View	100 m (328 ft)	23	2022	Civil Lines	
CFTC Tower	100 m (328 ft)	23	2018	Clifton	
La Grande	100 m (328 ft)	23	2017	North Nazimabad	
AA Residencia	100 m (328 ft)	23	2025	Gulshan-e-Iqbal	
Roshan Residencia	100 m (328 ft)	23	2025	P.E.C.H.S	
Royal Tower 1	80 m (262 ft)	22	2017	DHA	
Royal Tower 2	80 m (262 ft)	22	2017	DHA	
BRR Tower	82 m (269 ft)	22	2014	Downtown	
Tai Roshan Residency	72 m (236 ft)	22	2018	P.E.C.H.S	
ASF TOWERS 1	75 m (246 ft)	22	2022	Gulzar-e-Hijri	
ASF TOWERS 2	75 m (246 ft)	22	2022	Gulzar-e-Hijri	
ASF TOWERS 3	75 m (246 ft)	22	2022	Gulzar-e-Hijri	
ACM Tower	77 m (253 ft)	22	2018	Clifton	
SumSum Grand Residency	77 m (253 ft)	22	2018	P.E.C.H.S	
Lords Vista 1	70 m (230 ft)	22	2022	Gulzar-e-Hijri (SUPARCO Road)	
Lords Vista 2	70 m (230 ft)	22	2022	Gulzar-e-Hijri (SUPARCO Road)	
Lords Vista 3	70 m (230 ft)	21	2022	Gulzar-e-Hijri (SUPARCO Road)	
Sawera Residency	70 m (230 ft)	21	2025	Clifton	
King's Icon	72 m (236 ft)	21	2025	P.E.C.H.S	

== Buildings under construction ==
Building	Height	Floors	Location	Year of completion
Metro Marina	200 m (656 ft)	42	Clifton	202?
HSJ Icon	155 m (509 ft)	50	Downtown	202?
5 Sky towers	150 m (492 ft)	50	Clifton	
Dominion Twin Towers	150 m (492 ft)	40 x 2	Bahria Town	202?
Saima Waterfront	150 m (492 ft)	40	Crescent Bay	202?
Metro Beach Front	150 m (492 ft)	40	Crescent Bay	202?
The Groove	150 m (492 ft)	38	Clifton	202?
One Hoshang (HKC TOWERS)	150 m (492 ft)	37	Civil Lines	202?
Seafront towers	150 m (492 ft)	32	Clifton	202?
The Orchid	140 m (459 ft)	38	Clifton	202?
Residential Tower	130 m (427 ft)	32	Clifton	202?
Indigo Classic	120 m (394 ft)	32	Clifton	202?
Arabian Sea Tower	120 m (394 ft)	30	Clifton	202?

== Gallery ==
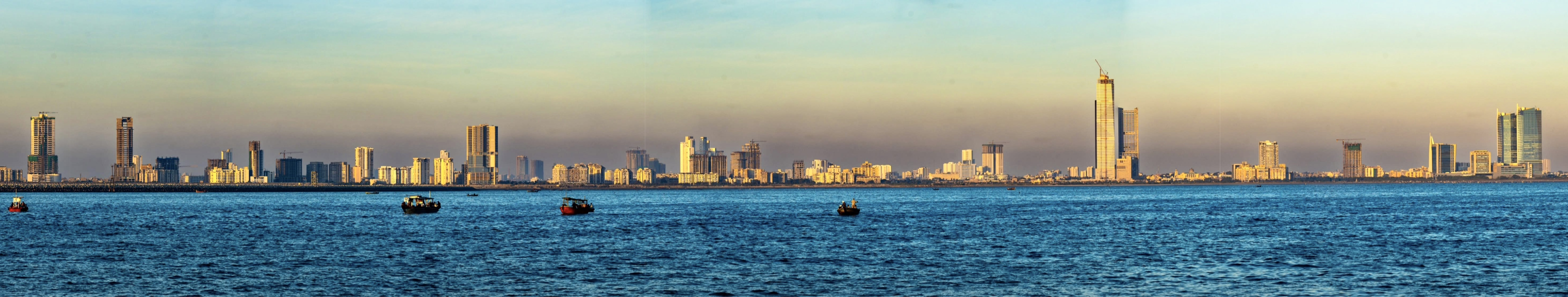
Skyline of Karachi 2025

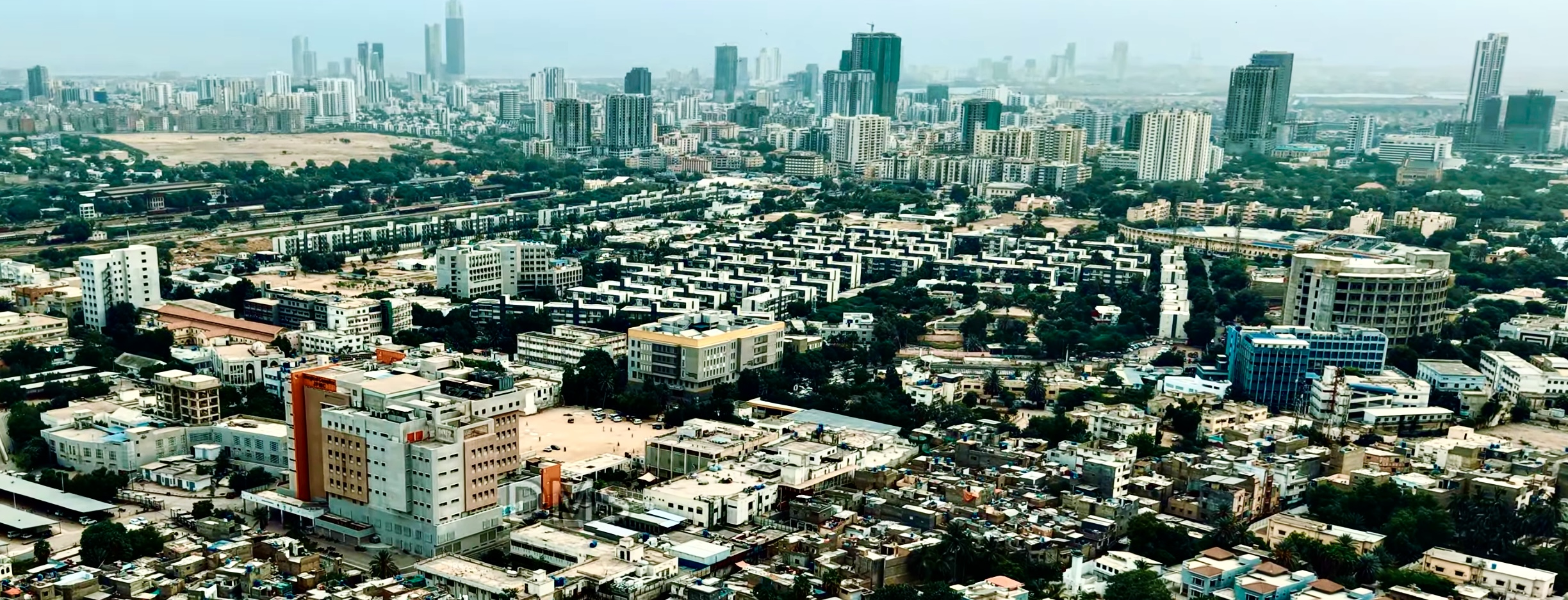
Clifton Skyline 2025

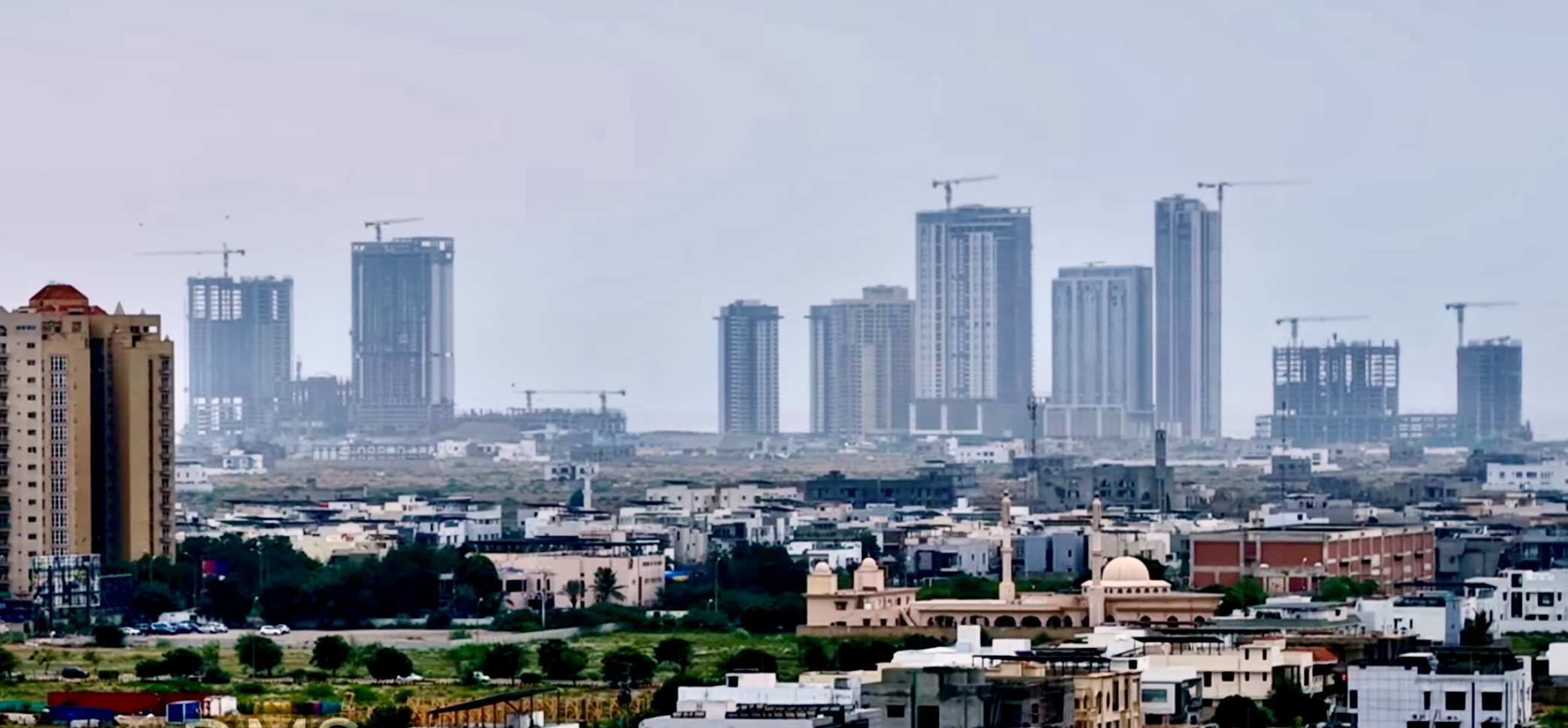
DHA Karachi Skyline 2025

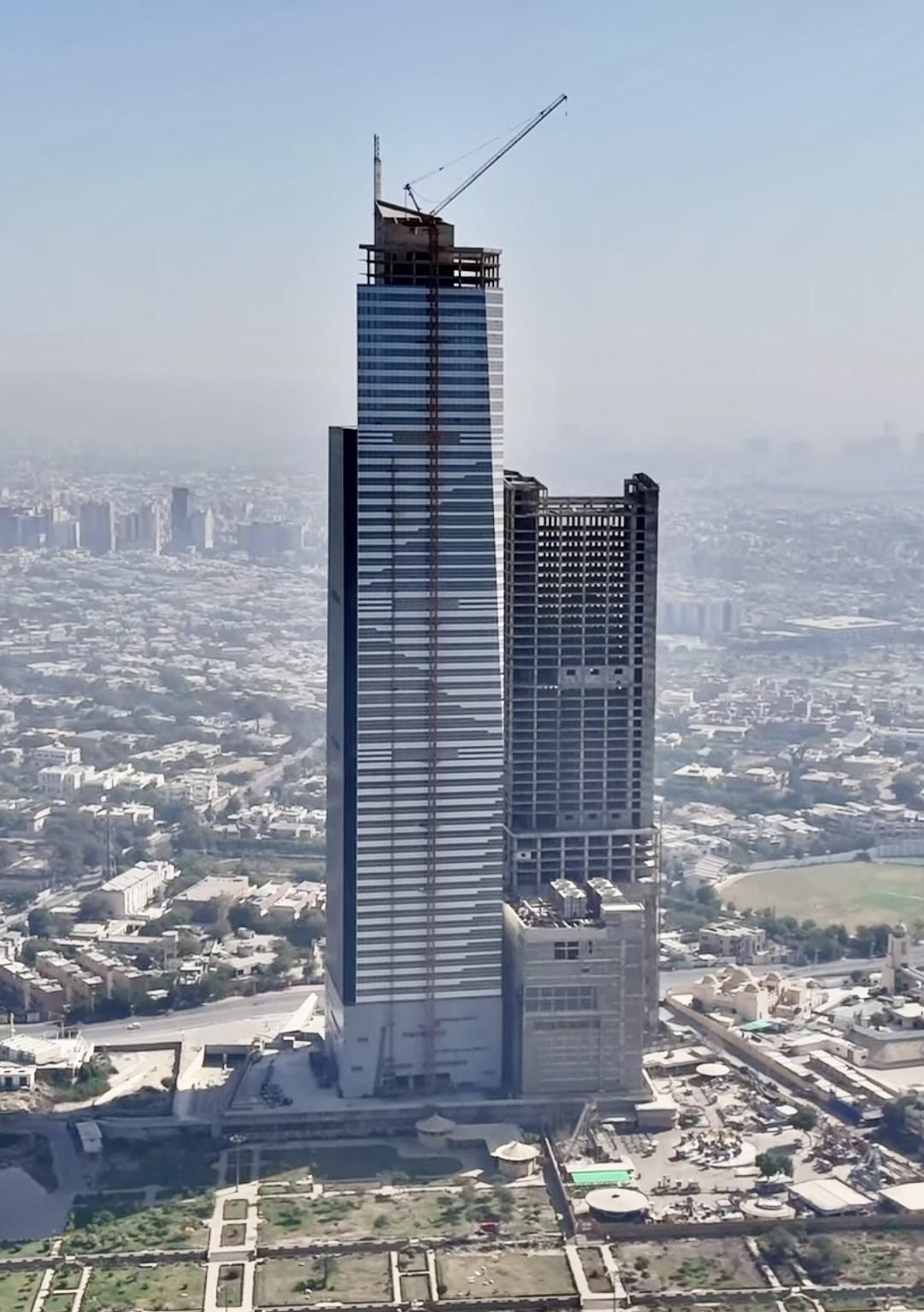
Bahria Icon

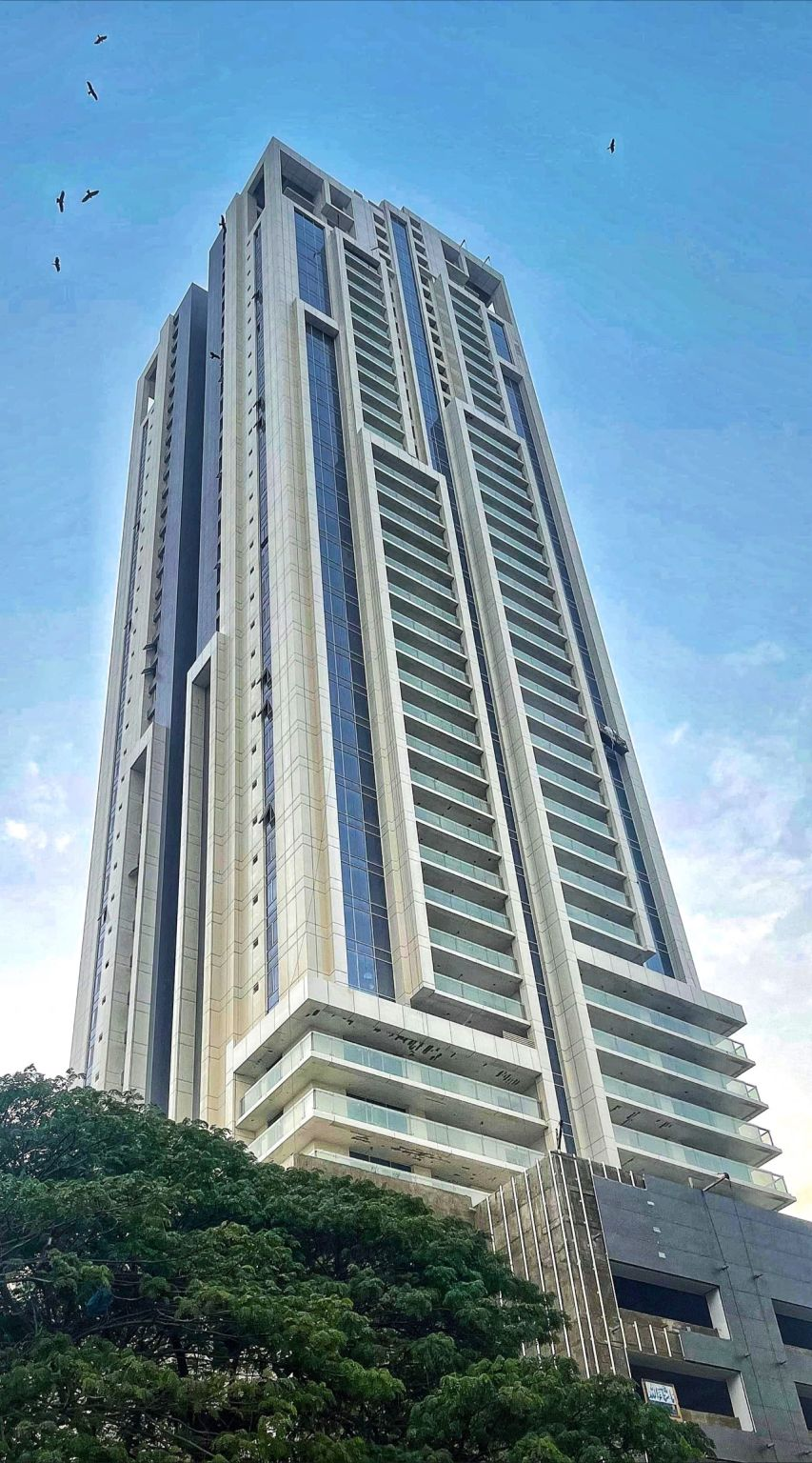
Chapal Skymark

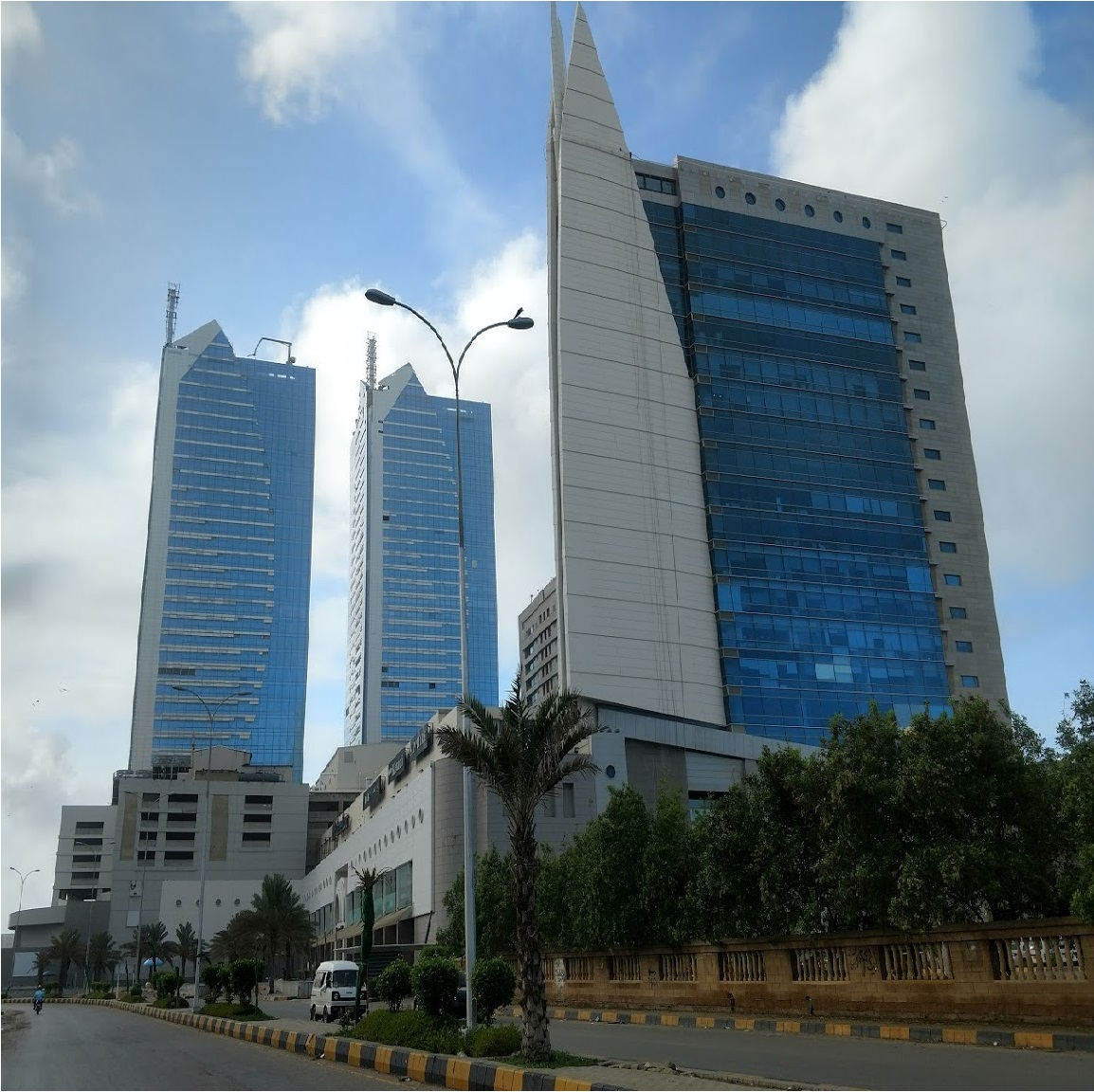
Dolmen Twin Towers

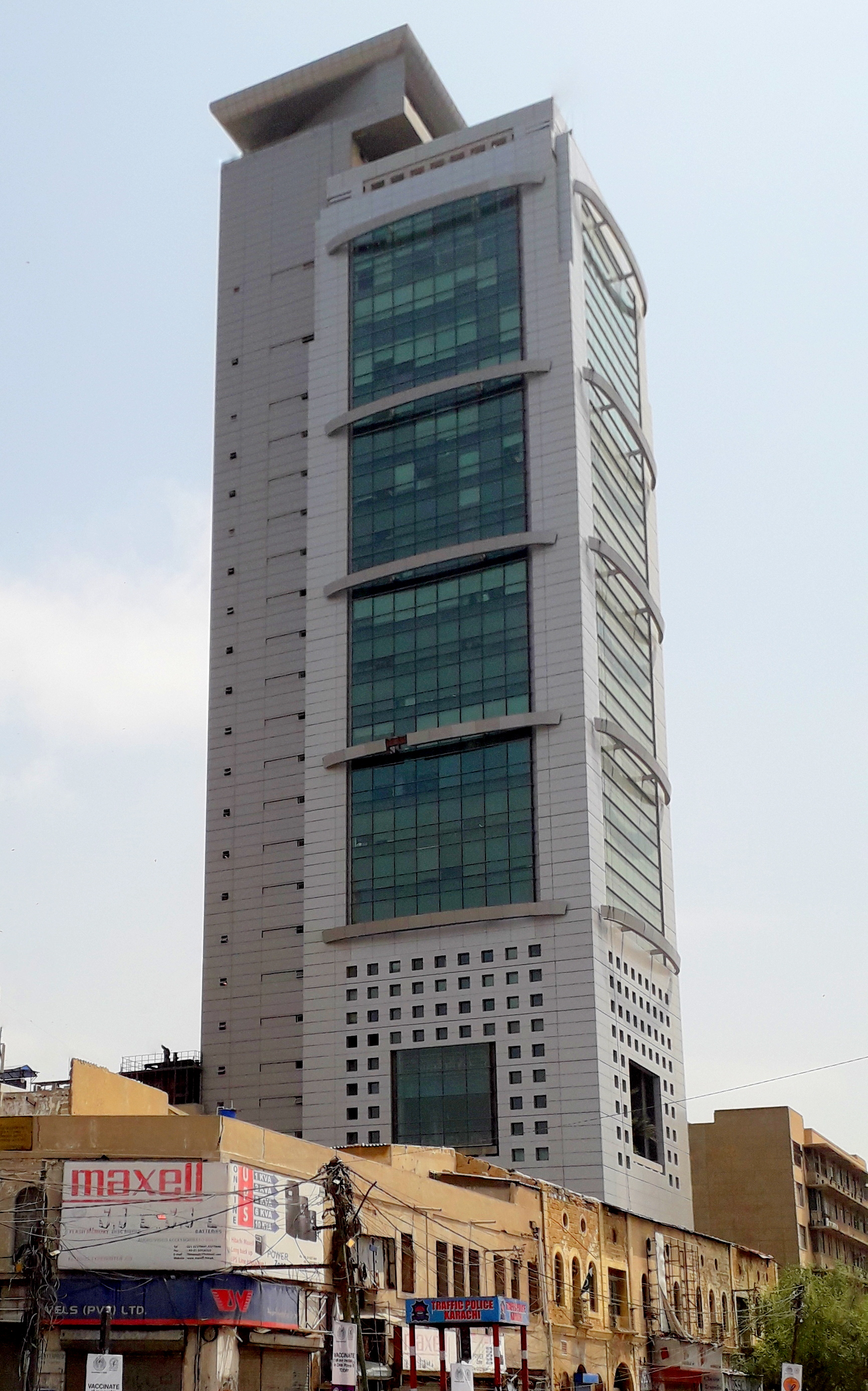
MCB Tower

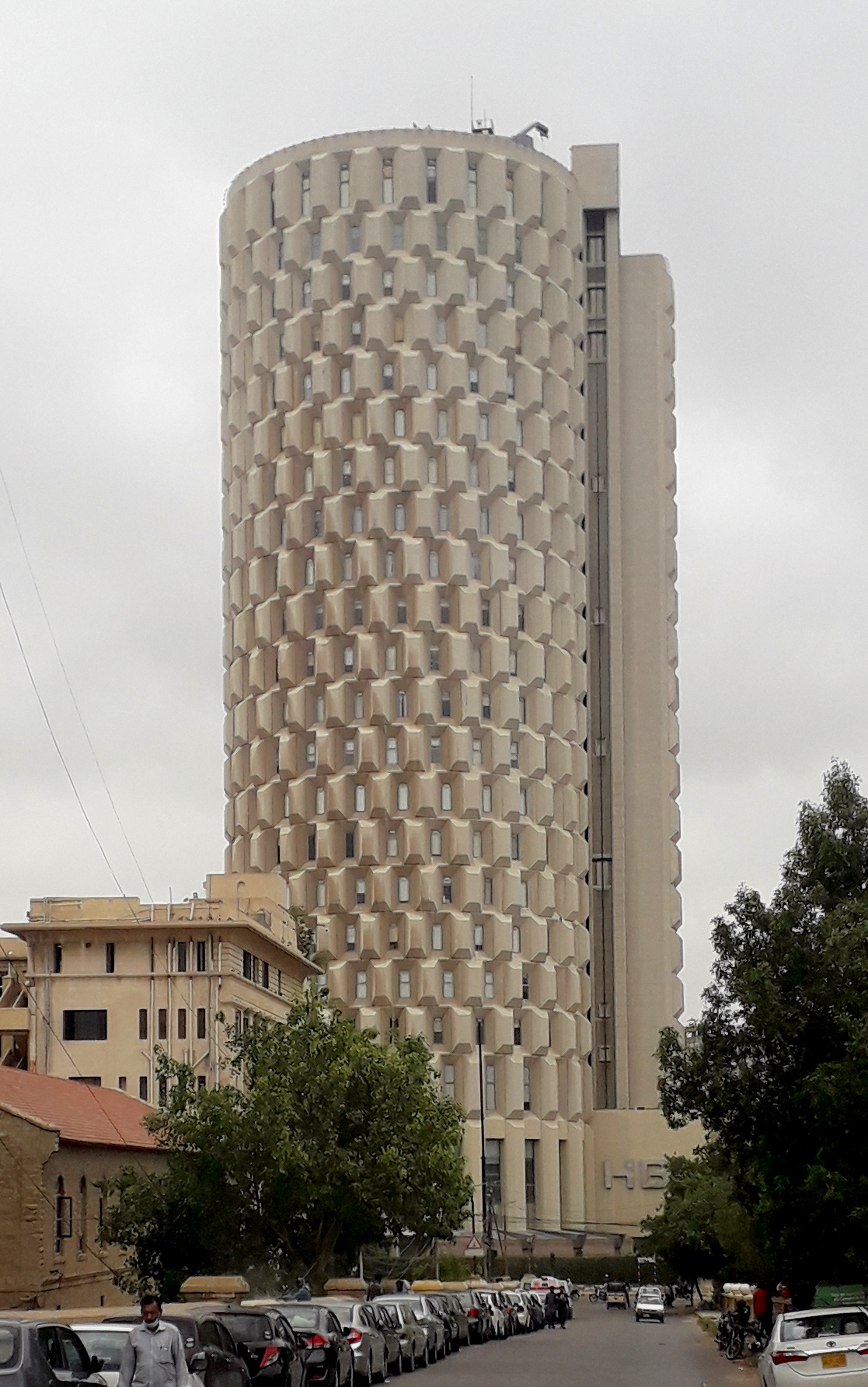
Habib Bank Tower

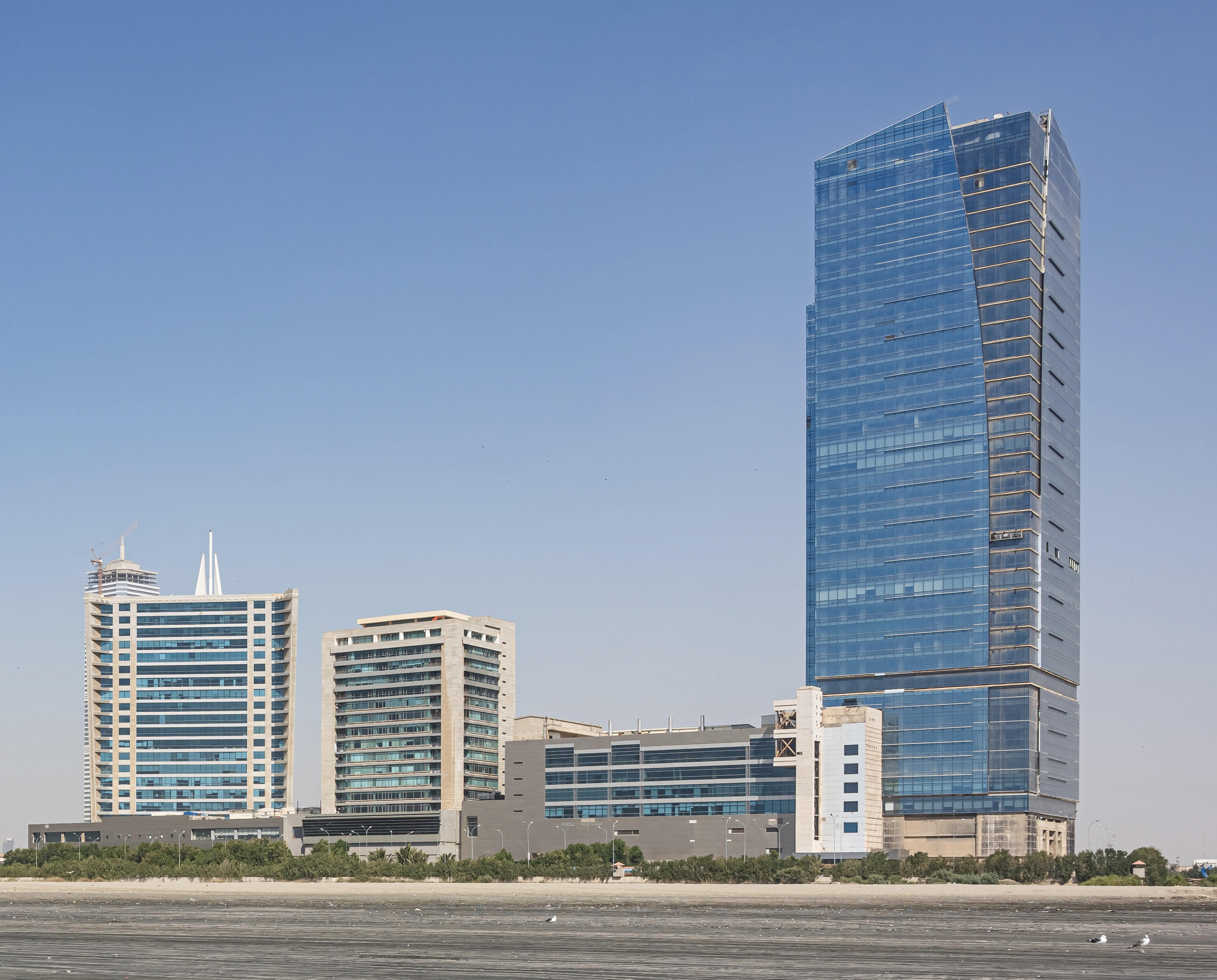
Dolmen City

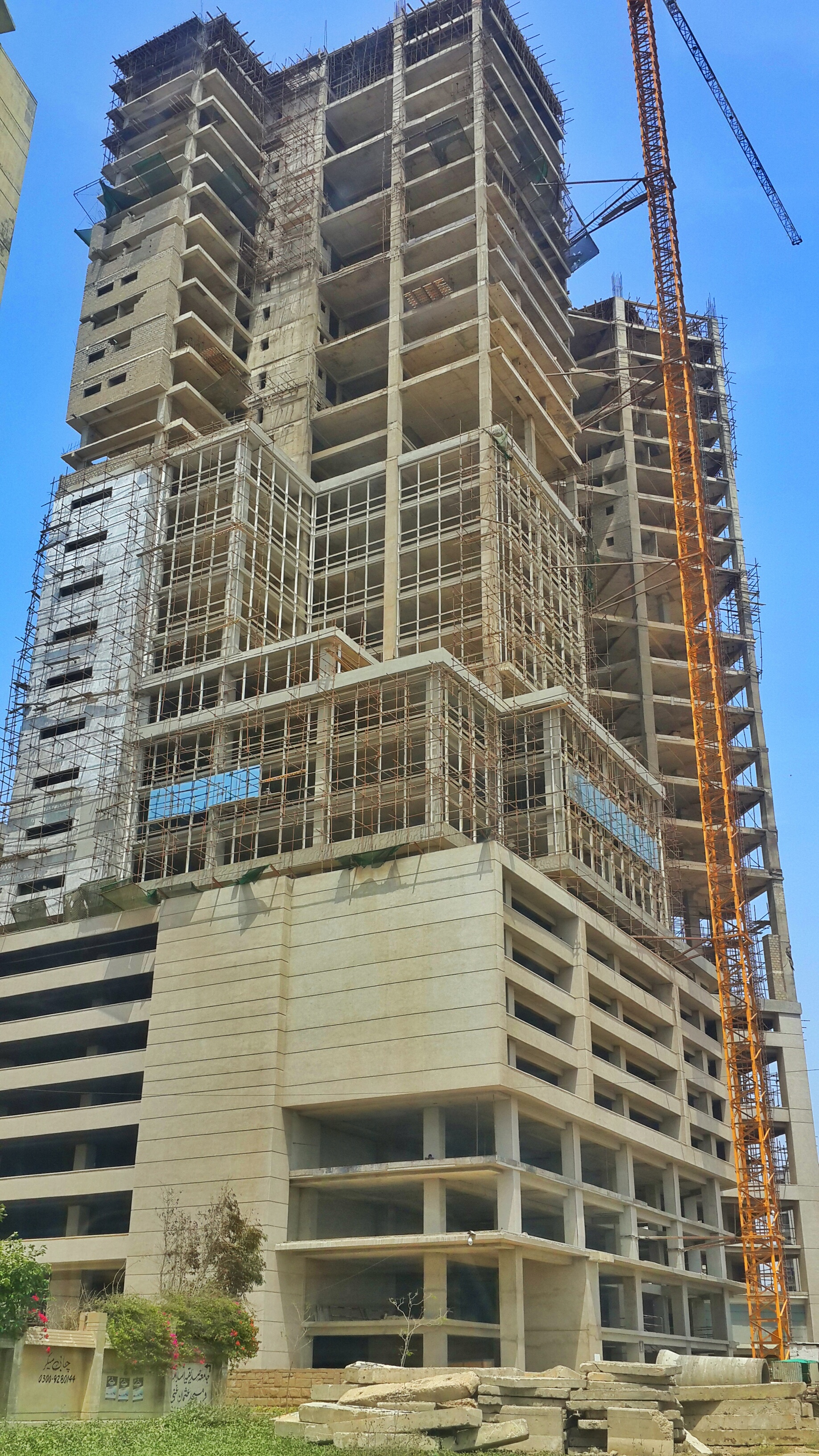
Bakht Tower, under construction in Karachi

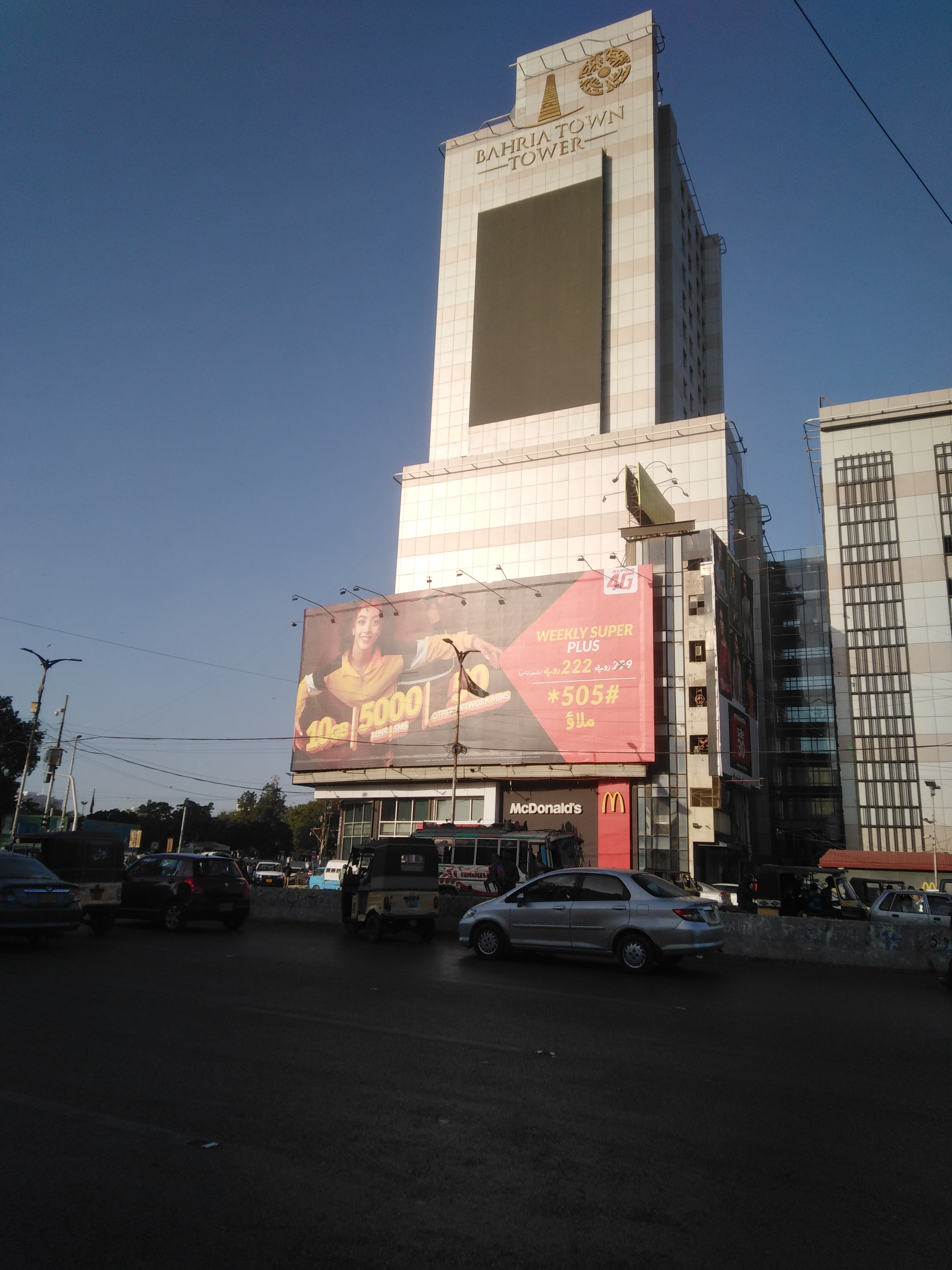
Bahria Town Towers

== See also ==
- List of tallest buildings in Pakistan
- List of tallest buildings in the world
