= List of tallest buildings in Islamabad =

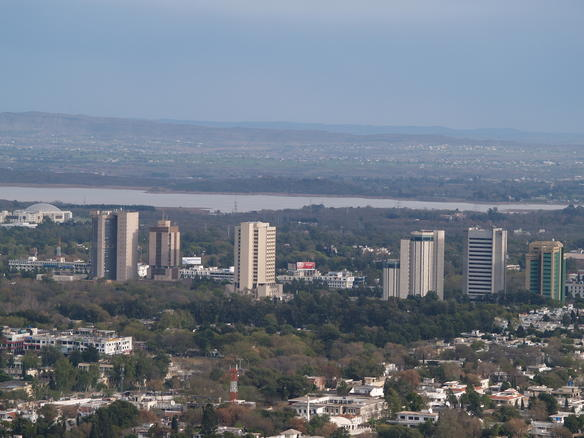
Jinnah Avenue aerial view

This is a list of the tallest buildings in Islamabad, the capital city of Pakistan.

== Tallest buildings ==
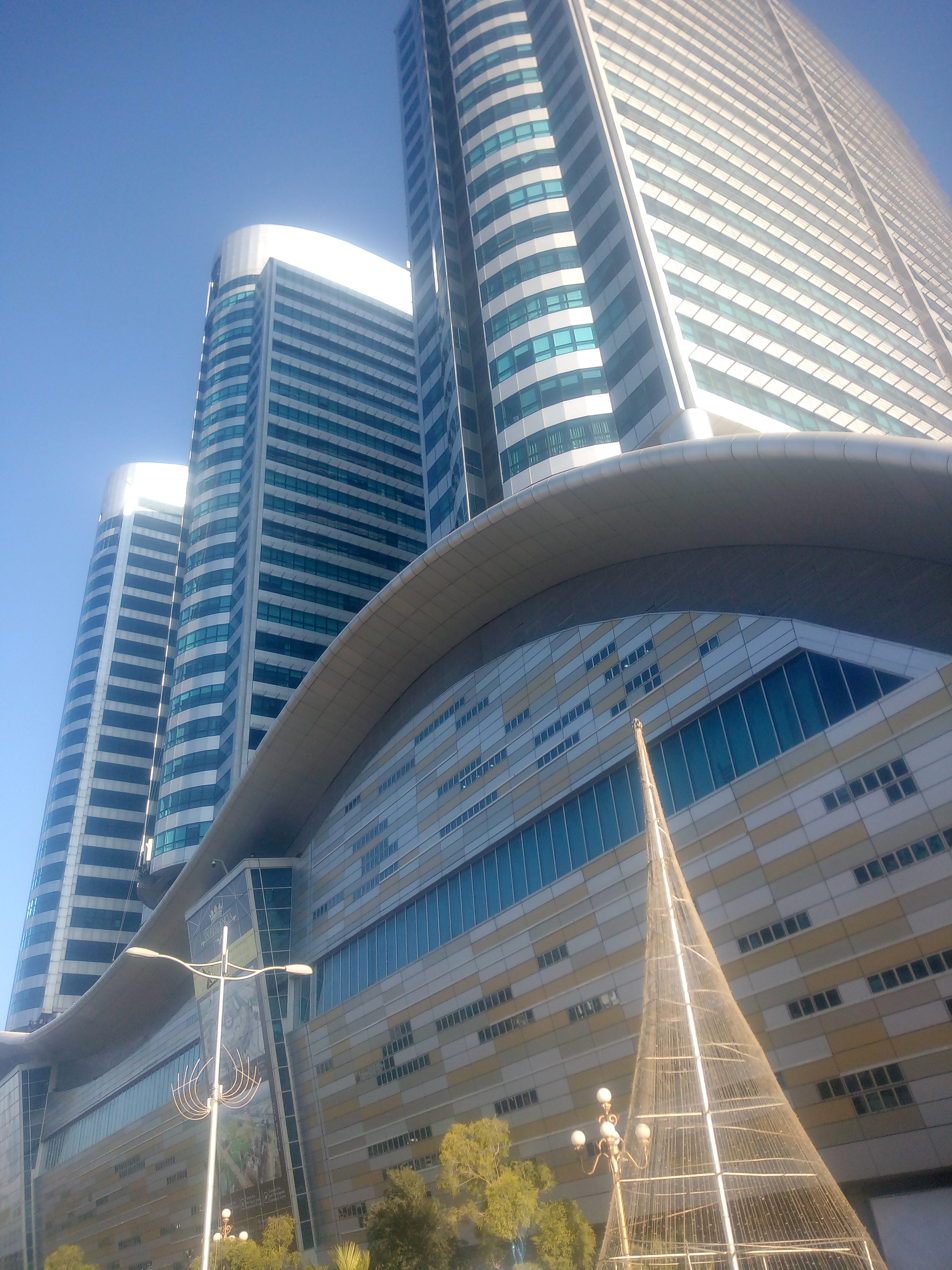
The Centaurus Mall, Islamabad, Pakistan

Telecom Tower & Islamabad Stock Exchange

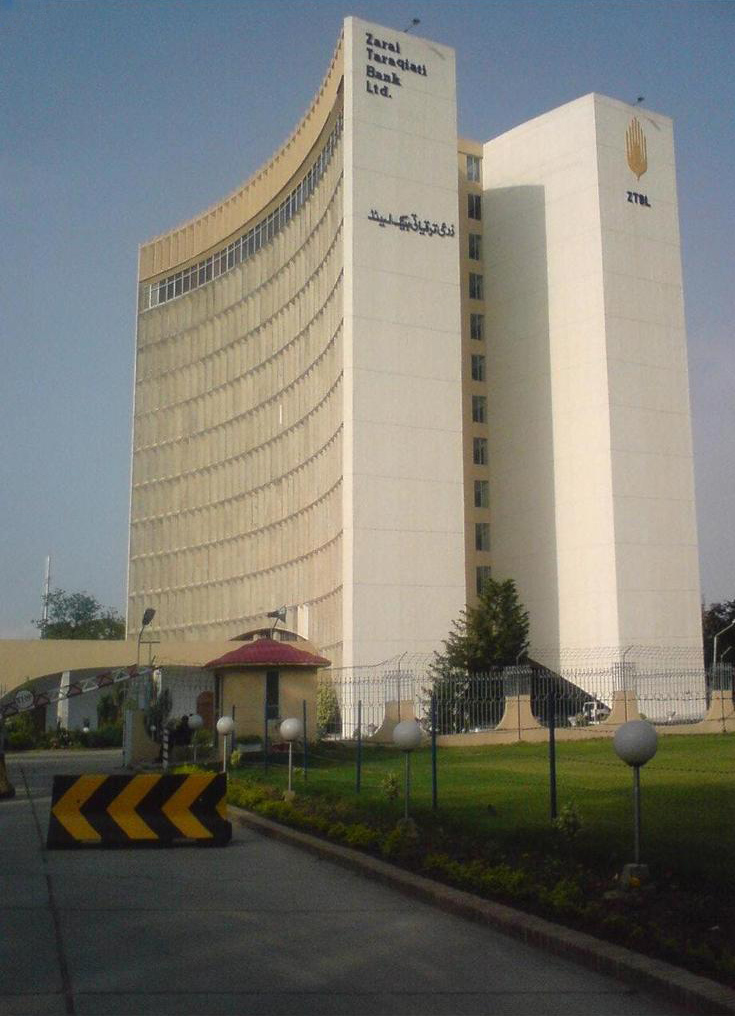
Zarai Taraqiati Bank Limited Headquarters

The following list ranks complete buildings in Islamabad by height that are at least 60 metres tall.

Was the tallest building in Islamabad upon completion

Name	Height m (ft)	Floors	Year
Gold crest views tower 1-6	150 m (492 ft)	40	2026
Garden residence tower c	141 m (463 ft)	36	2027
giga mall extension	130 m (427 ft)	30	2027
Telecom Tower	113 m (371 ft)	24	2011
Centaurus Corporate Tower	110 m (361 ft)	26	2012
Centaurus Residential Tower 1	110 m (361 ft)	26	2012
Centaurus Residential Tower 2	110 m (361 ft)	26	2012
Saudi Pak Tower	72 m (236 ft)	19	2021
One Constitution Avenue Tower 1	105.5 m (346 ft)	26	2014
One Constitution Avenue Tower 2	105.5 m (346 ft)	26	2014
Islamabad Stock Exchange Towers	76 m (249 ft)	19	2009
Habib Bank Tower	78.88 m (259 ft)	19	
Lignum Tower	83.03 m (272 ft)	20	2013
Ufone Tower	113 m (371 ft)	28	2010
Le Meridien Hotel	71 m (233 ft)	17	
UBL Building	66.5 m (218 ft)	16	
Shaheed-e-Millat Secretariat	66.5 m (218 ft)	16	
Oil & Gas Development Company (OGDCL) building		16	2006
Khudadad Heights		16	
Green Trust Tower		16	
NIC Building		15	
Zarai Taraqiati Bank Limited Headquarters		11	
Pinnacle Tower		12	

== Under construction buildings ==
This lists buildings that are under construction and are planned to rise at least 72 metres (236 ft). Buildings that are only approved, on-hold or proposed are not included in this table.

Name	Height (m)	Floors
Movenpick Hotel	182.7 m	36
Grand Hyatt Hotel	166 m	40
Karakorum Gulberg Greens	130 m	30
J7 Emporium	130 m	30
The Sixth Boulevard, Mall & Apartment		27
The Nexus Mall		26
Citadel 7 by Chakor Ventures		20
Avari Hotel		28
Emirates Mall & Residency		22
Goldcrest Highlife		26
AAA Octa Business District Phase-8 Rawalpindi		25
Defence Tower		25
Opal Mall & Luxury Suites	247 ft	21+2
BF Tower	110 m	22
Mall Of Islamabad	100 m	24+2 (26)
Cloud Tower 1	98.4504 m	29
World Trade Center (Platinum Square)	91+ m	28+
Elysium Tower		16
Safa Burj Mall		23
Defence Executive Apartments		+18
Pakland Tower 2	62 m	15
Sparco Tower		13
Grand Orchard		17
Goldcrest Commercial		9

== See also ==
- List of tallest buildings in Pakistan
- List of tallest buildings and structures in Afghanistan
