= Kabul Tower =

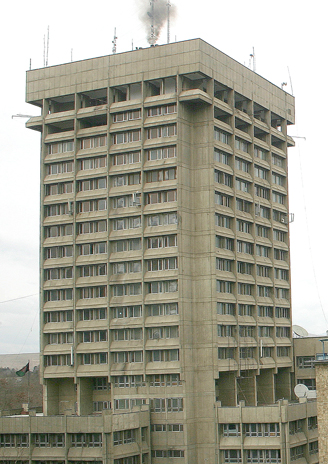
- Kabul Tower as of January 2006

- Location within Afghanistan

General information
- Type: High-rise building
- Architectural style: Brutalism
- Location: Kabul, Afghanistan, Afghanistan
- Coordinates: 34°32′N 69°10′E
- Current tenants: Ministry of Communications and Information Technology
- Completed: 1976

Height
- Height: 87 m (285 ft)

Technical details
- Floor count: 18

Kabul Tower, also referred to as the MOC Tower and Telecom Tower, is an 18-story brutalist high-rise building in Kabul, Afghanistan built in the 1970s. With a height of 87 metres (285 ft) to the tip and an architectural height of 75 metres (246 ft), the Kabul Tower was for a long time the tallest building in Afghanistan until being eclipsed by the Kabul Markaz Residential Tower 1 in 2020. Kabul Tower is a government office building and serves as the Headquarters of the Ministry of Communications and Information Technology

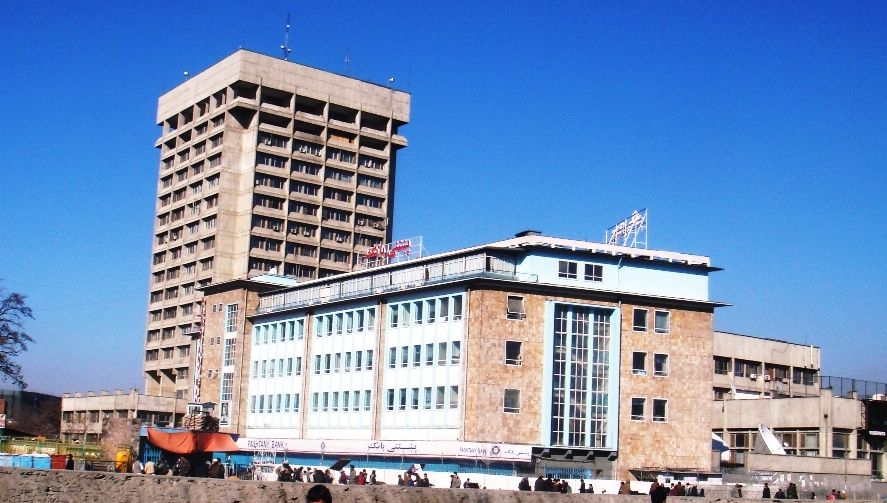
Kabul Tower, 2009

== See also ==
- List of tallest buildings and structures in Afghanistan
