= Habib Bank Plaza =

Building in Karachi, Pakistan

- حبیب بینک پلازہ
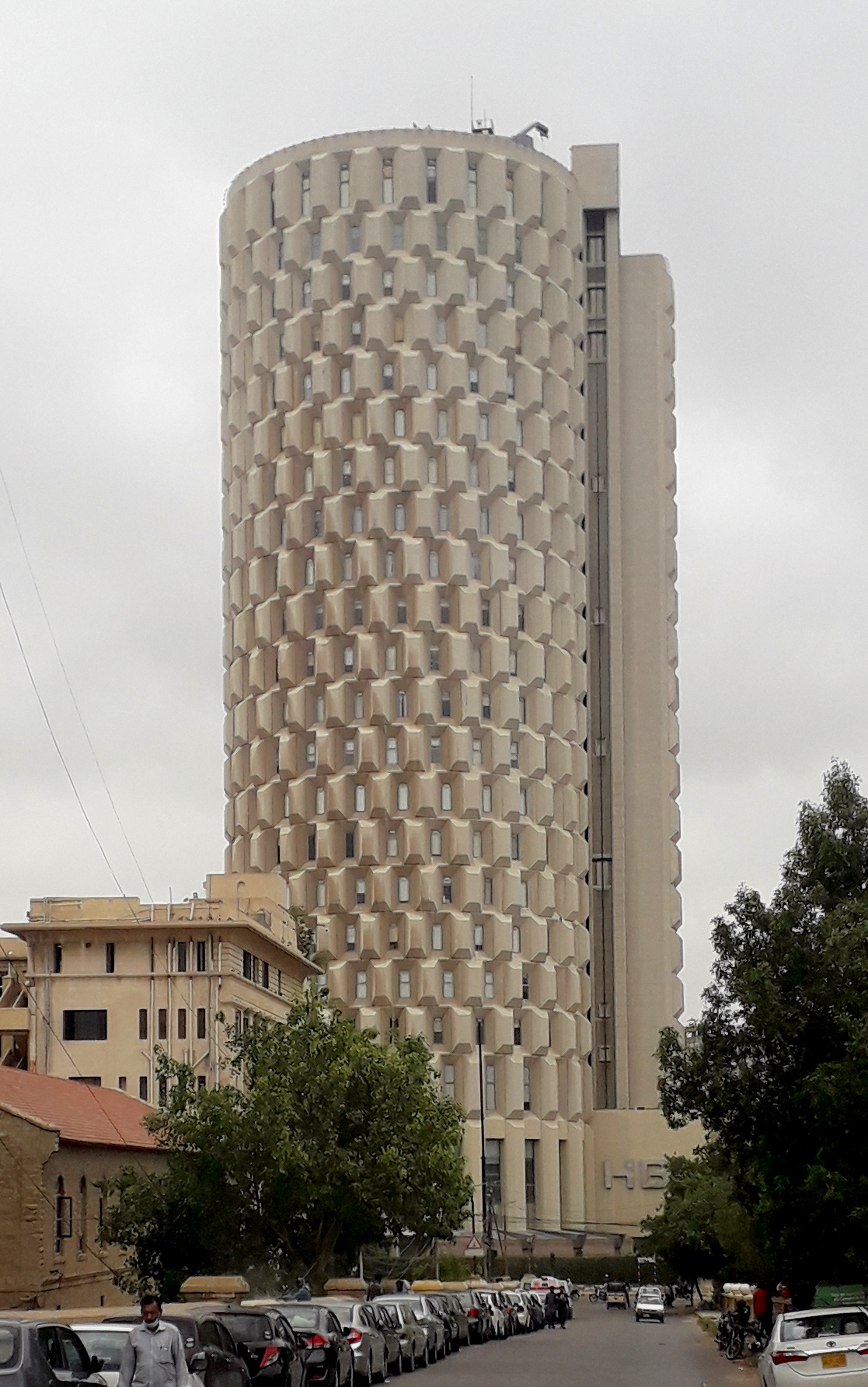
- Habib Bank Plaza

General information
- Type: Bank
- Location: Karachi, Pakistan, I. I. Chundrigar Road, Karachi-75650, Pakistan
- Coordinates: 24°50′59″N 67°00′20″E
- Construction started: 1963
- Construction stopped: 1969
- Completed: 1971
- Owner: Habib Bank Ltd (49%), AKFED (51%)

Height
- Roof: 101 m

Technical details
- Floor count: 22

Design and construction
- Architect: Leo A. Daly

Habib Bank Plaza (Urdu: حبیب بینک پلازا), also known as HBL Plaza, located on I. I. Chundrigar Road in Karachi, Sindh, Pakistan, is the head office of Habib Bank Limited. It was once the tallest building in Asia, a title that hasn't been held by any other building in South Asia, and was one of only three to hold the title outside of East and Southeast Asia, while still under construction between 1963 and 1968. It was also the tallest building in South Asia until 1972. It remained the tallest building in Pakistan for four decades until the 29-floor and 116 metres (381 ft) tall MCB Tower was built, also in Karachi.

HBL Plaza was inaugurated to mark the 25th anniversary of the bank, and started its operations on 4 September 1971. The Ruet-e-Hilal Committee, the official moon-sighting body in Pakistan, has regularly used the building over the years to convene meetings for moon sighting. As of 2021, it housed more than 1,770 employees.

== See also ==
- Economy of Pakistan
- List of tallest buildings in Pakistan
- List of tallest buildings in Karachi
