= List of tallest buildings and structures in Afghanistan =

This list of the tallest buildings and structures in Afghanistan ranks skyscrapers, towers and other structures in Afghanistan by their height.

== Tallest Buildings ==
The tallest building in Afghanistan upon completion

This list ranks the tallest buildings and structures in Afghanistan, based on standard height measurement. Only completed or topped out structures are included.

Name	Image	City	Height	Floors	Completion	Building type	Notes
Azizi Plaza		Kabul	105 m (344 ft)	24	2014	Mixed-use	Tallest building in Afghanistan. Afghanistan's first skyscraper.
Mohib Towers		Kabul	101 m (331 ft)	28	2022	Highrise	Afghanistans second skyscraper.
Azizi tower		Kabul	91 metres (298 ft)	21	2020	Residential	
Azizi tower 2		Kabul	89 meters (288 ft)	20	2020	Residential	
Azim tower		Kabul	88 meters (288 ft)	19	2025	Residental	
Kabul Tower			87 metres (285 ft)	18	1976	Office	Other names: MOC Tower (Ministry of Communication), Telecom Tower.
Agricultural Development Bank Building (Formerly Pamir Cinema building)		Kabul	48 meters (157 ft)	14		Office	
Taksar tower		Kabul	45 meters (147 ft)	13		Residental	
Kabul City Center		Kabul	40 meters (131 ft)	9	2005		
Kabul Business Center		Kabul	35 meters (114 ft)	8		Office	

== Under construction ==
This list ranks buildings and structures that are under construction in Afghanistan and are planned to rise at least 50 m (165 ft) or 10 floors tall. Buildings under construction that have already been topped out are also included, as are those whose construction has been suspended.

Name	Image	City	Height	Floors	Completion	Building type	Reference
Katawazai Skyscraper		Kabul	130-160 meters	41		Mixed-use	Will become the tallest building in Afghanistan upon completion

== See also ==
- List of dams and reservoirs in Afghanistan
- List of tallest buildings and structures in South Asia
- List of tallest buildings in Pakistan
- List of tallest buildings in Asia
