= North Eye =

General information
- Status: Under Construction (52nd Floor Roof Slab completed as on 10-july-2020)
- Type: Residential
- Location: Sector 74, Noida

Technical details
- Floor count: 66

Design and construction
- Architect: Space Designers International
- Developer: Supertech

The North Eye is an under-construction residential skyscraper in Noida, National Capital Region, India. It is expected to be the tallest residential building in North India. The tower will have 66 floors upon completion. As of April 2018, the 46th Floor Roof Slab casting has been completed. The pit foundation, with the depth of 48.5 metres (159 ft) was completed in Jan 2013.
