= List of tallest buildings in Pakistan =

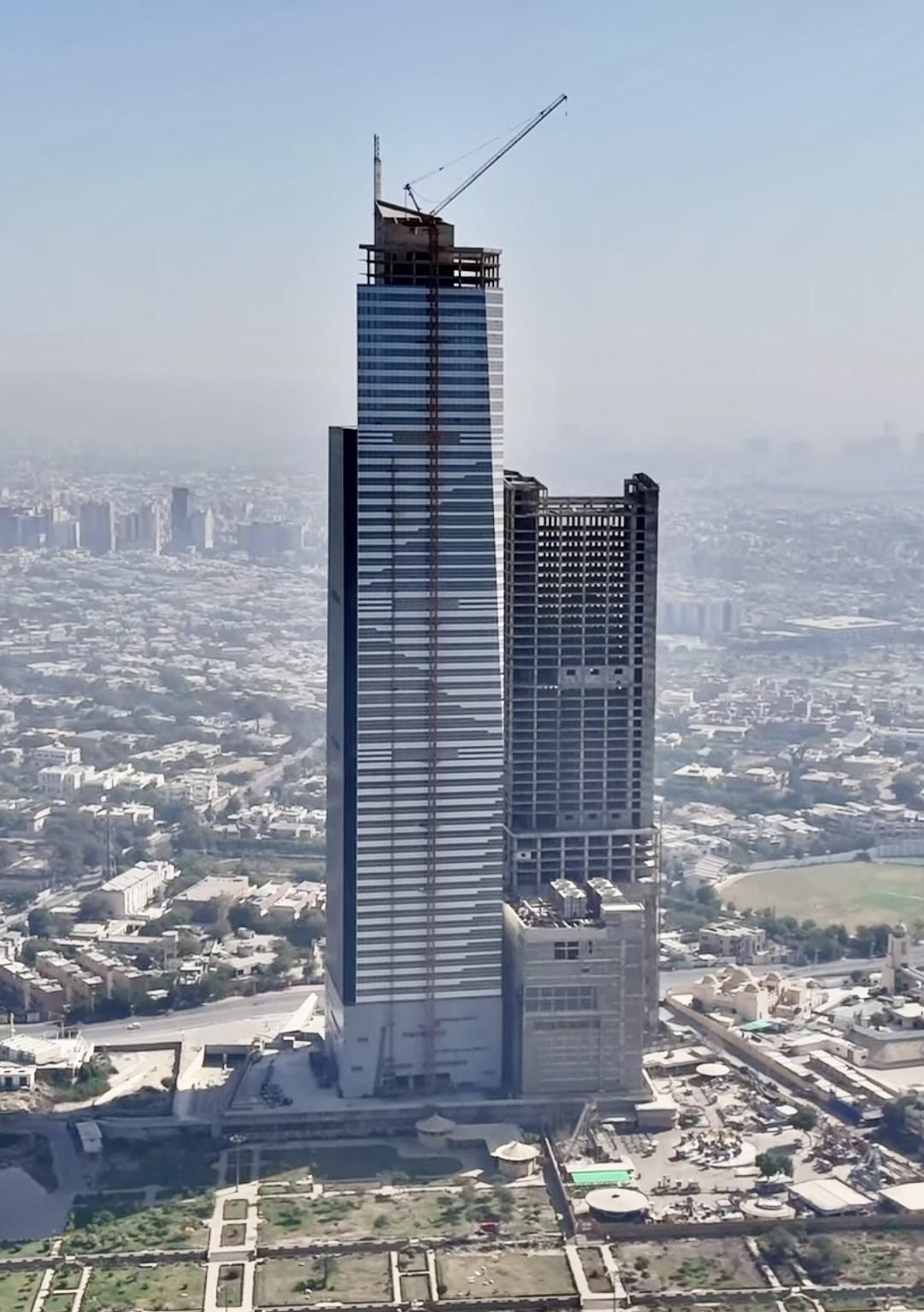
The Bahria Icon Tower in Karachi is the tallest building in Pakistan

This list of the tallest buildings and structures in Pakistan ranks skyscrapers and towers in Pakistan by height. An incomplete list of the tallest buildings in Pakistan.

The current tallest building in Pakistan is the Bahria Icon Tower in Karachi. The 70-floor building rises to 300 m (984 ft).

== Tallest buildings ==
This list ranks completed and topped out buildings that stand at least 100 m (328 ft) or 20 floors, based on standard height measurement. This height includes spires and architectural details but does not include antenna masts. Existing partially habitable structures are included for ranking purposes based on present height. Karachi has the most completed highrise buildings in Pakistan, followed by Islamabad.

Was the tallest building in Pakistan upon completion.

| Rank | Name | Image | Height m (ft) | Floors | Year | Location | Notes References |
|---|---|---|---|---|---|---|---|
| 1 | Bahria Icon Tower | | 300 m (984 ft) | 70 | 2022 | Karachi | Tallest building in Pakistan. |
| 2 | Parsa City Club Towers | | 235 m (771 ft) | 47 | 2025 | Karachi | |
| 3 | Bahria Hotel Tower | | 230 m (755 ft) | 45 | 2021 | Karachi | |
| 4 | Chapal Skymark | | 210 m (689 ft) | 50 | 2021 | Karachi | |
| 5 | Emaar Panorama | | 200 m (656 ft) | 50 | 2024 | Karachi | |
| 6 | Emaar The Views | | 200 m (656 ft) | 45 | 2024 | Karachi | |
| 7 | Bahria Apartment Tower | | 200 m (656 ft) | 42 | 2021 | Karachi | |
| 12 | Palmyra Air Towers | | 200 m (656 ft) | 52 | 2020 | Karachi | |
| 13 | Frere Heights | | 200 m (656 ft) | 49 | 2020 | Karachi | |
| 14 | The Grand Central Mall Faisalabad | | 191 m (627 ft) | 40 | 2025 | Faisalabad | |
| 15 | Movenpick Hotel | | 182.7 m (599 ft) | 36 | 2025 | Islamabad | |
| 16 | One Oshang 1 | | 180 m (591 ft) | 45 | 2023 | Karachi | |
| 17 | Citadel 7 | | 175 m (574 ft) | 35 | 2025 | Islamabad | |
| 18 | Dolmen Hotel Tower 3 | | 175 m (574 ft) | 42 | 2019 | Karachi | |
| 19 | Dolmen Sky Tower 4 | | 174.5 m (573 ft) | 42 | 2019 | Karachi | |
| 20 | Orient Square | | 170 m (558 ft) | 45 | 2022 | Lahore | |
| 21 | Grand Hyatt Hotel | | 166 m (544 ft) | 40 | 2025 | Islamabad | |
| 22 | Bahria Opal 225 | | 160 m (525 ft) | 41 | 2020 | Karachi | |
| 23 | Hoshang Pearl | | 160 m (525 ft) | 35 | 2018 | Karachi | |
| 24 | Nova Prime 2 | | 158 m (518 ft) | 40 | 2025 | Lahore | |
| 25 | Prime 1 | | 158 m (518 ft) | 40 | 2023 | Lahore | |
| 26 | HSJ Icon | | 155 m (509 ft) | 49 | 2024 | Karachi | |
| 27 | Blue World Trade Center | | 155 m (509 ft) | 30 | 2025 | Rawalpindi | |
| 28 | Dolmen Tower A | | 151 m (495 ft) | 40 | 2020 | Karachi | |
| 29 | Dolmen Tower B | | 150.4 m (493 ft) | 40 | 2020 | Karachi | |
| 30 | Prime 2 | | 150 m (492 ft) | 38 | 2023 | Lahore | |
| 31 | Dominian Twin Tower | | 150 m (492 ft) | 41 | 2024 | Karachi | |
| 32 | Metro Beach Front | | 150 m (492 ft) | 40 | 2024 | Lahore | |
| 33 | GoldCrest Views Tower 1 | | 150 m (492 ft) | 40 | 2025 | Rawalpindi | |
| 34 | GoldCrest Views Tower 2 | | 150 m (492 ft) | 40 | 2025 | Rawalpindi | |
| 35 | GoldCrest Views Tower 3 | | 150 m (492 ft) | 40 | 2025 | Rawalpindi | |
| 36 | GoldCrest Views Tower 4 | | 150 m (492 ft) | 40 | 2025 | Rawalpindi | |
| 37 | GoldCrest Views Tower 5 | | 150 m (492 ft) | 40 | 2025 | Rawalpindi | |
| 38 | GoldCrest Views Tower 6 | | 150 m (492 ft) | 40 | 2025 | Rawalpindi | |
| 39 | GoldCrest Views Tower 7 | | 150 m (492 ft) | 40 | 2025 | Rawalpindi | |
| 40 | KASB Altitude | | 150 m (492 ft) | 38 | 2017 | Karachi | |
| 41 | Summit Tower | | 132 m (433 ft) | 33 | 2018 | Karachi | |
| 42 | Lucky One | | 130 m (427 ft) | 28 | 2020 | Karachi | |
| 43 | 70 Riviera | | 130 m (427 ft) | 32 | 2017 | Karachi | |
| 44 | Arkadians Tower A | | 128 m (420 ft) | 32 | 2019 | Karachi | |
| 45 | Metro Twin Tower 1 | | 125 m (410 ft) | 30 | 2018 | Karachi | |
| 46 | Metro Twin Tower 2 | | 125 m (410 ft) | 30 | 2018 | Karachi | |
| 47 | Hoshang Pearl | | 124 m (407 ft) | 31 | 2019 | Karachi | |
| 48 | Com-3 Tower 1 | | 124 m (407 ft) | 32 | 2018 | Karachi | |
| 49 | Com-3 Tower 2 | | 124 m (407 ft) | 32 | 2018 | Karachi | |
| 50 | Ocean Towers | | 120 m (394 ft) | 30 | 2013 | Karachi | Tallest in Pakistan, 2012–2014 |
| 51 | The Centaurus Corporate | | 116 m (381 ft) | 23 | 2013 | Islamabad | |
| 52 | The Centaurus Residencia | | 116 m (381 ft) | 23 | 2013 | Islamabad | |
| 53 | Centaurus Mövenpick Hotel | | 116 m (381 ft) | 23 | 2013 | Islamabad | |
| 54 | MCB Tower | | 116 m (381 ft) | 29 | 2005 | Karachi | Tallest in Pakistan (2005–2012) |
| 55 | Ufone Tower (Telecom Tower) | | 113 m (371 ft) | 26 | 2011 | Islamabad | |
| 56 | Centre Point Tower | | 110 m (361 ft) | 28 | 2013 | Karachi | |
| 57 | Coral Tower 1 | | 107 m (351 ft) | 28 | 2018 | Karachi | |
| 58 | Coral Tower 2 | | 107 m (351 ft) | 28 | 2016 | Karachi | |
| 59 | Arfa Software Technology Park | | 106 m (348 ft) | 17 | 2012 | Lahore | |
| 60 | Mont Vista | | 105 m (344 ft) | 26 | 2017 | Karachi | |
| 61 | One Constitution Avenue Tower 1 | | 105 m (346 ft) | 26 | 2017 | Islamabad | |
| 62 | One Constitution Avenue Tower 2 | | 105 m (346 ft) | 26 | 2017 | Islamabad | |
| 63 | Mega G4 Tower | | 105 m (344 ft) | 26 | 2016 | Karachi | |
| 64 | Marine View Tower | | 103 m (338 ft) | 26 | 2019 | Karachi | |
| 65 | Habib Bank Plaza | | 102 m (335 ft) | 24 | 1963 | Karachi | Asia’s first skyscraper, Tallest in Asia (1963–1968) Tallest in South Asia (1963–1970) Tallest in Pakistan (1963–2005) |
| 66 | UBL Tower | | 101 m (331 ft) | 25 | 2017 | Karachi | |
| 67 | Dolmen Harbour Front | | 101 m (331 ft) | 19 | 2007 | Karachi | |
| 68 | JS Centre | | 100 m (328 ft) | 22 | 2013 | Karachi | |
| 69 | PRC Towers | | 100 m (328 ft) | 23 | 2005 | Karachi | |
| 70 | Autograph Signature Suites | | 100 m (328 ft) | 28 | 2023 | Lahore | |

== Tallest under construction or proposed ==
This list ranks buildings in Pakistan that are proposed or approved and are planned to rise at least 100 metres (328 feet).

| Name | Image | City | Height m (ft) | Floors | Completion | Building type | Notes | Reference |
|---|---|---|---|---|---|---|---|---|
| Port Tower Complex | | Karachi | 593 m (1,946 ft) | 130 | | Mixed-use | | |
| The Eiffel Tower Building | | Islamabad | 400 m (1,300 ft) | 88 | | Mixed-use | | |
| KPT Tower | | Karachi | 352 m (1,155 ft) | 80 | | Mixed-use | | |
| FWO Towers | | Karachi | | 65 | | | | |
| Grand Hyatt Islamabad | | Islamabad | 217 m (712 ft) | 50 | | Hotel | | |
| The Centarus Hotel | | Islamabad | 200 m (656 ft) | 38 | | Hotel | | |
| Pearl Continental Tower | | Lahore | 150 m (492 ft) | 40 | | Mixed-use | | |
| Marvida Tower Faisalabad | | Faisalabad | 135 m (440 ft) | 25 | | Mixed-use | | |
| Sheraton Hotel | | Lahore | | 32 | | Mixed-use | | |
| LDA Twin Tower I | | Lahore | | 28 | | Mixed-use | | |
| LDA Twin Tower II | | Lahore | | 28 | | Mixed-use | | |

== Timeline of tallest buildings ==
This is a list of buildings that once held the title of being the tallest building in Pakistan. All of the buildings are in Karachi.

| Name | Image | City | Height m (ft) | Floors | Building type | Years tallest | Notes | References |
|---|---|---|---|---|---|---|---|---|
| Habib Bank Plaza | | Karachi | 101 m (331 ft) | 25 | Office | 1962–2005 | Tallest building in Asia (1963-1965), Tallest in South Asia (1963–1970). | |
| MCB Tower | | Karachi | 116 m (381 ft) | 29 | Office | 2005–2012 | | |
| Ocean Towers | | Karachi | 120 m (394 ft) | 30 | Mixed-use | 2012–2016 | | |
| Bahria Icon Tower | | Karachi | 273 m (896 ft) | 62 | Mixed-use | 2016–present | Topped out in 2017. Tallest in South Asia (2017–2018) | |

== See also ==
- List of tallest buildings in Karachi
- List of tallest buildings in Lahore
- List of tallest buildings in Islamabad
- List of tallest buildings and structures in Afghanistan
- List of tallest buildings in Asia
- List of tallest buildings in the world
