= Bahria Icon Tower =

Skyscraper in Karachi, Pakistan

- برج بحریہ آئکون
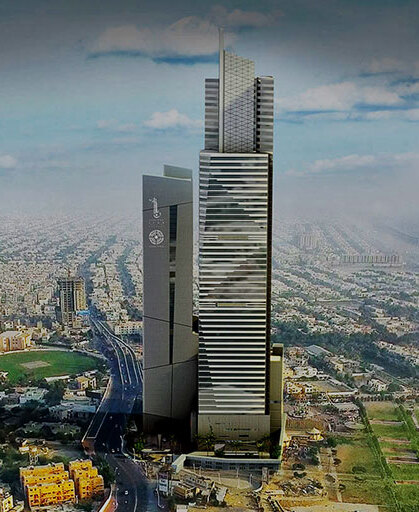
- Bahria Icon in 2021

General information
- Status: Topped-out
- Location: Bahria Town Icon Tower, #5, Block 4, Shahrah-e-Firdousi, Clifton, Karachi-75600, Pakistan
- Coordinates: 24°48′42.48″N 67°1′43.25″E
- Construction started: 2009
- Topped-out: 2017
- Completed: March 2016
- Cost: US$162.5 million
- Owner: Bahria Town

Height
- Tip: 300 m (980 ft)
- Roof: 273 m (896 ft)

Technical details
- Floor count: 62 + 7 below ground
- Floor area: 2,230,500 square metres (24,009,000 sq ft)
- Lifts/elevators: 16

Design and construction
- Architect: Arshad Shahid Abdullah (Pvt.) Ltd.
- Developer: Bahria Town
- Structural engineer: BEG Associates, ESS.I.AAR.
- Main contractor: Habib Rafiq (Pvt.) Ltd.

Other information
- Parking: 1,700 spaces

Website
- bticon.com

The Bahria Icon Tower is a skyscraper complex in the seaside municipality of Clifton in Karachi, Pakistan. The complex includes a 62-storey tower, which at 300 metres (980 ft), is the tallest building in Pakistan. The complex also includes an adjacent 42-storey building, and is owned by the Bahria Town Group.

The construction of the Bahria Icon Tower was started in 2009, and was completed in March 2016. Further development of the complex has been on hold since 2021.

== Bahria Town Icon ==
The Bahria Town Icon is a 62-storey, 273-metre (896 ft) skyscraper in the skyscraper complex, Bahria Icon Tower.

== Bahria Hotel Tower ==
Bahria Hotel Tower is 42-storey, 200-metre (660 ft) skyscraper in the skyscraper complex, Bahria Icon Tower.

== Mall of Karachi ==
The Mall of Karachi is a mall located in Bahria Hotel Tower and Bahria Town Icon, it is spread across eight floors.

== Location ==
The complex is based on a 1.6 ha (4.0-acre) plot in the up-scale Clifton area, and is immediately adjacent to the Bagh Ibne Qasim park, and the shrine of Abdullah Shah Ghazi - an 8th-century mystic who is widely regarded as the patron saint of Karachi.

== History ==
Construction began in 2009. During its construction, excavations for the foundations caused inconvenience for traffic flow. It was topped out in October 2017. In November 2018, a small fire broke out at the site where a marriage hall and cinema were being installed. There was a display of fireworks upon its completion. Construction had been slow and marred by allegations of corruption against the owner of Bahria Group, Malik Riaz.

In May 2025, the Federal Board of Revenue (FBR) announced plans to auction Bahria Icon Tower to recover due Rs. 26.46 billion in unpaid taxes, scheduling it for 19 June 2025 under section 138(2)(a) of the Income Tax Ordinance, 2001. However, on June 13, 2025, the Islamabad High Court (IHC) issued a stay order, halting the auction process. This came after a petition filed by Bahria Town, asserting that it was not involved in the £190 million NAB Al-Qadir Trust case corruption case.

Further development of the complex has been on hold since 2021.

In May 2025, the Federal Board of Revenue (FBR) announced plans to auction Bahria Icon Tower to recover Rs. 26.46 billion in unpaid taxes, scheduling it for 19 June 2025 under Section 138(2)(a) of the Income Tax Ordinance, 2001.

== Details ==
The main building consists of 10 floors of serviced corporate offices and 40 floors of serviced apartments, Pakistan's highest located terraced restaurant, a double-decker high speed elevator, and a shopping mall. The building will be serviced by 16 high-speed elevators. It will have a car park with 1,700 spaces, and a total area of 2,230,500 m^{2} (24,009,000 sq ft).

It has 62 floors above ground, and 7 below ground. It is made of reinforced concrete with a glass facade. Steel was procured by Cellpor, and produced in conjunction with the Luxembourg-based ArcelorMittal conglomerate. It is expected to be complete by March 2023. Over the past three years, no progress has been built and the building is still not finished to this very day.

== Honours and awards ==
The design won architectural design awards for efficient use of space and maximization of utility, including

- Highly commended high-rise architecture, International Property Award winners from Asia Pacific 2012.

== Gallery ==
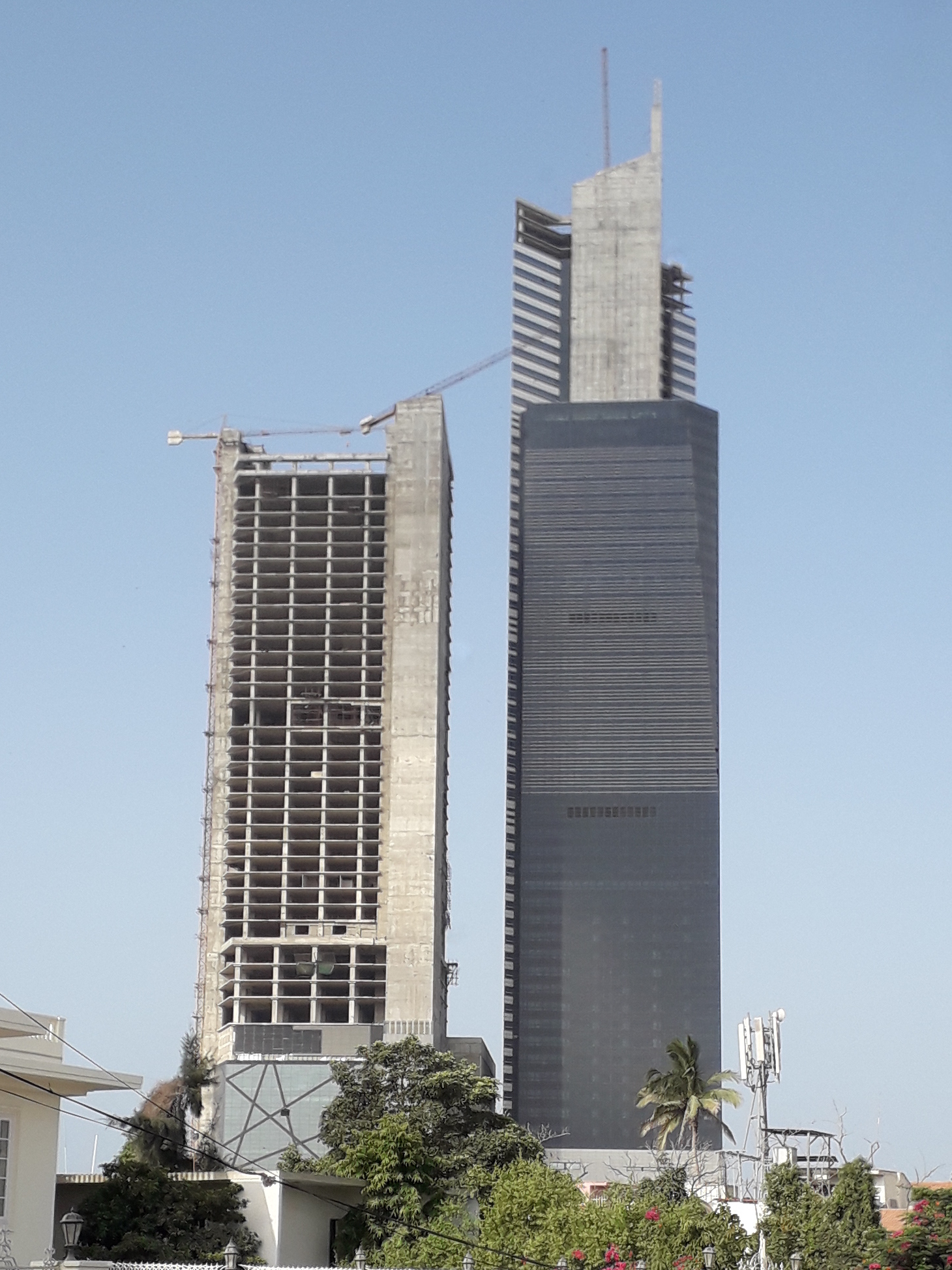
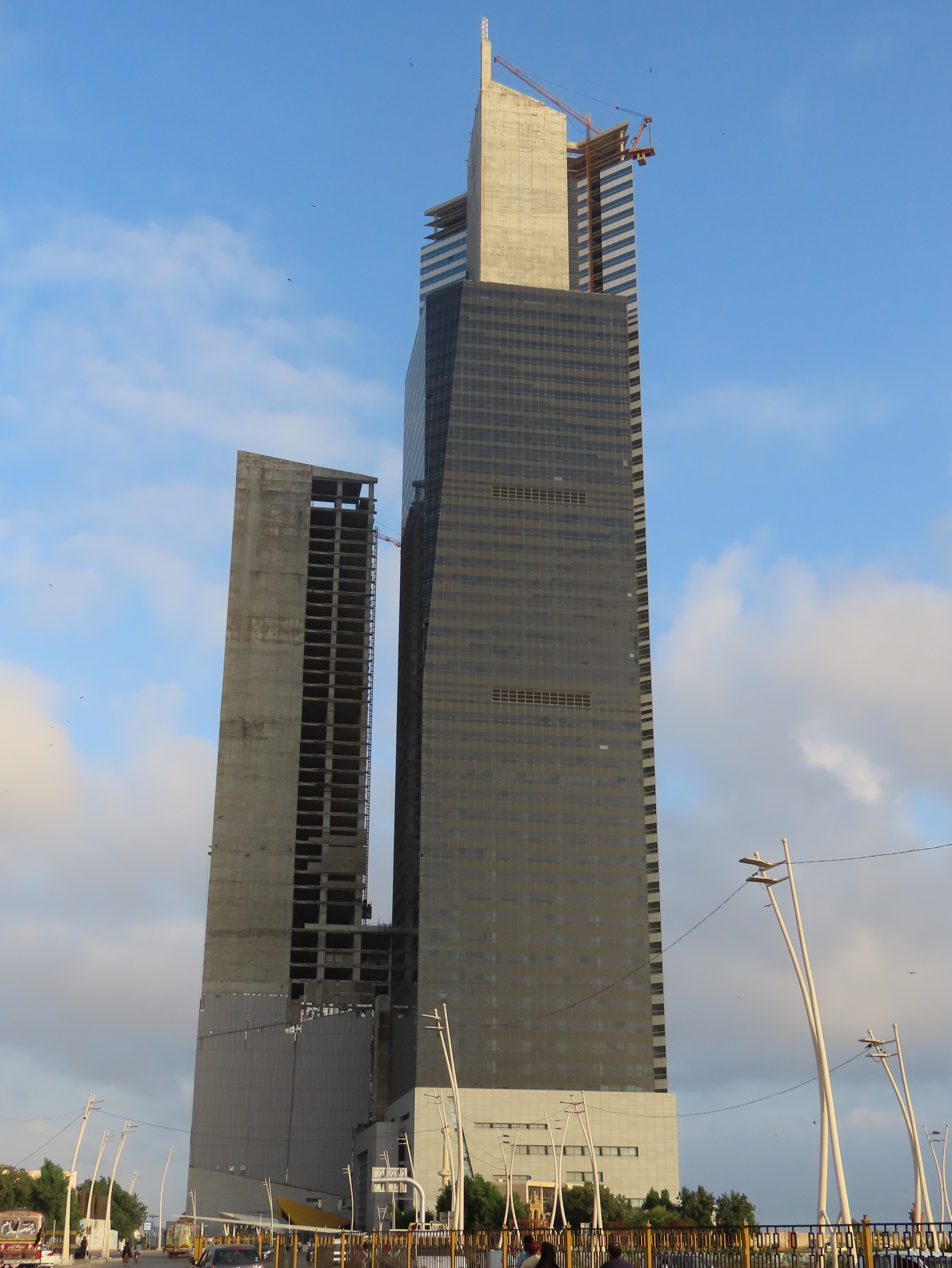
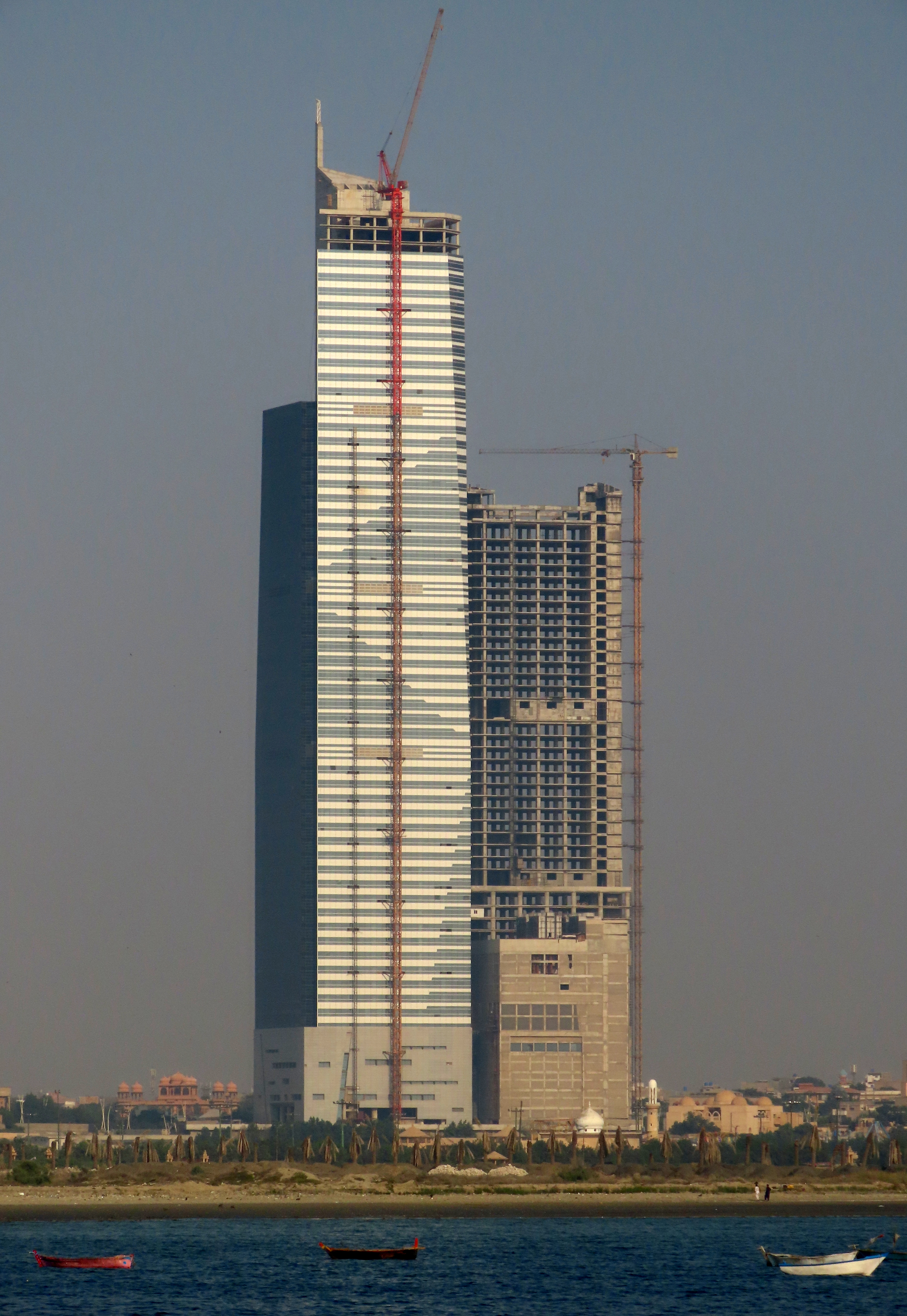

== See also ==
- List of tallest buildings in Pakistan
- List of tallest buildings in Karachi
