= Chapal Skymark =

Under-construction tower in Karachi, Pakistan

- نشان آسمان چپل

General information
- Status: Delivered
- Location: Civil Lines
- Completed: 2026
- Owner: Chapal Builders

Height
- Height: 152 m

Technical details
- Floor count: 50 Storey

Design and construction
- Developer: Chapal Builders

Website
- chapals.com/skymark

Google map link

== Chapal Skymark ==
Chapal Skymark is a 50-storey residential tower developed by Chapal Builders in Karachi, Sindh, Pakistan. Located on Dr. Ziauddin Ahmed Road near the Mövenpick Hotel and Pearl-Continental Hotel, the project is a high-rise residential development offering apartments with modern layouts and a range of shared facilities. Chapal Skymark is presented by its developer as Pakistan’s first 50-storey residential tower.

The building offers three-bedroom Signature Apartments, with residential spaces designed to accommodate families and urban residents. Its location provides access to major roads, commercial areas, hotels, and business districts within Karachi.

=== Architectural and Residential Features ===
Chapal Skymark comprises 50 storeys of residential accommodation and shared building facilities. The tower features a main entrance lobby, a guest waiting area, high-speed passenger elevators, service elevators, and dedicated parking facilities. The apartments are designed to provide functional living spaces, while the building’s upper levels offer views of Karachi’s urban skyline.

=== Amenities and Recreational Facilities ===
The residential development includes a range of recreational and communal facilities intended for residents. These include a swimming pool, clubhouse, gymnasium, jacuzzi, sauna, and indoor games facilities. Additional recreational spaces provide areas for residents to relax and participate in leisure activities within the building.

The clubhouse serves as a shared space for residents, while the gymnasium supports indoor fitness activities. The swimming pool and associated wellness facilities form part of the tower’s recreational offering.

=== Building Services and Safety Facilities ===
Chapal Skymark incorporates building services intended to support daily residential operations. These include backup power generation, high-speed vertical transportation, CCTV surveillance, and controlled access arrangements. Fire detection and firefighting systems, along with emergency safety provisions, form part of the building’s safety infrastructure.

The tower also includes dedicated parking and service areas to support residents and visitors. These facilities are intended to improve accessibility, security, and the day-to-day functioning of the residential building.

=== Developer ===
Chapal Skymark was developed by Chapal Builders, a Pakistani real estate development company established in 1968. The project forms part of the company’s residential development portfolio in Karachi.
