= MCB Tower =

Skyscraper in Karachi, Pakistan

- برج ایم سی بی
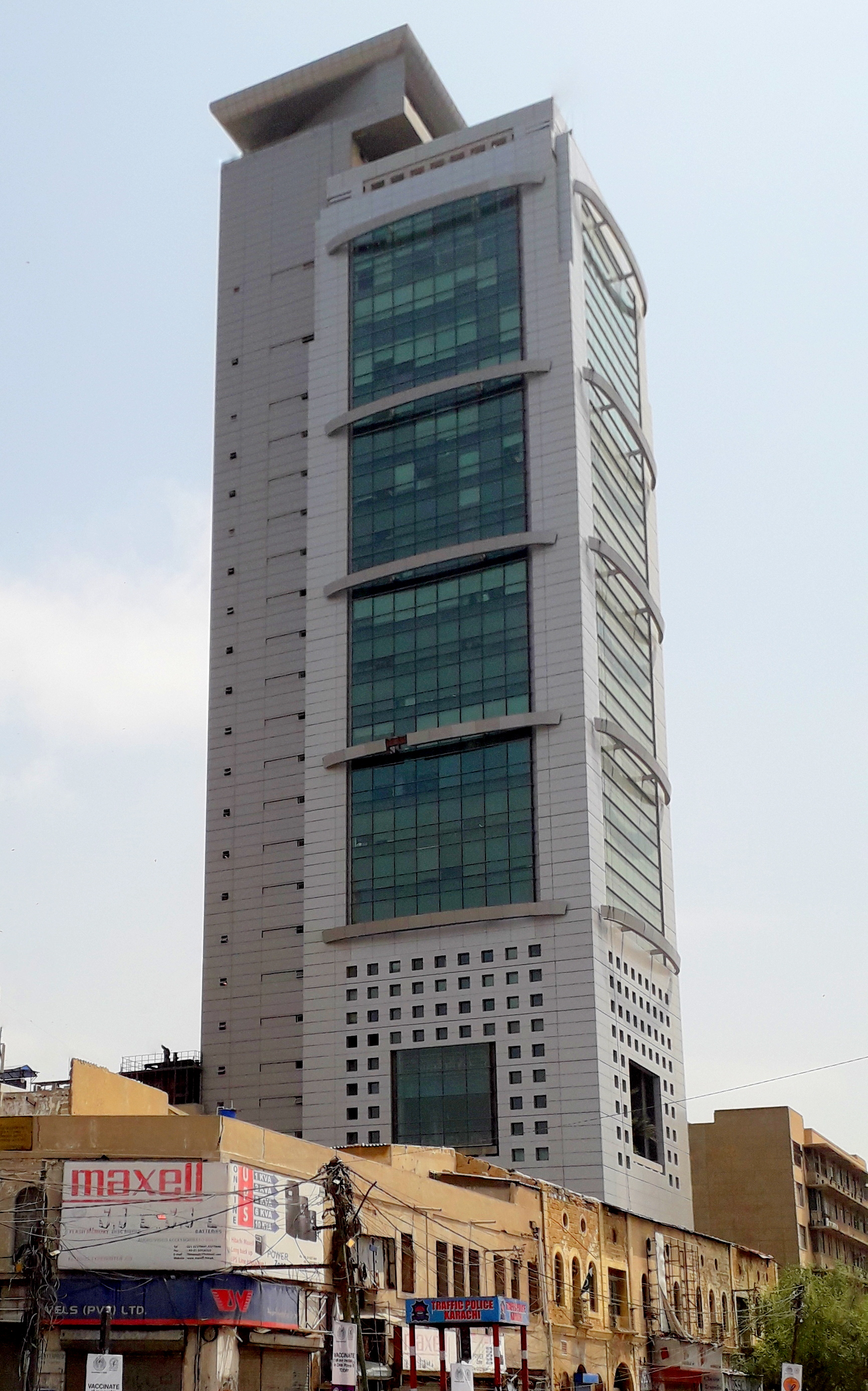

General information
- Type: Headquarters
- Location: Karachi, Sindh, Pakistan
- Completed: 2005

Height
- Roof: 116 m (381 ft)

Technical details
- Floor count: 29
- Lifts/elevators: 6

Website
- mcb.com.pk/mcb

MCB Tower, situated in Karachi, Pakistan, is the former headquarters of MCB Bank Limited. It is the fifteenth tallest building in Pakistan. It is about 116 metres (381 ft) tall and contains 29 floors and 3 basement floors.

== History ==
Construction began in 2000 and was completed in 2005. The building was designed by Arshad Shah Abdullah. It was the tallest building in the country until 2012.

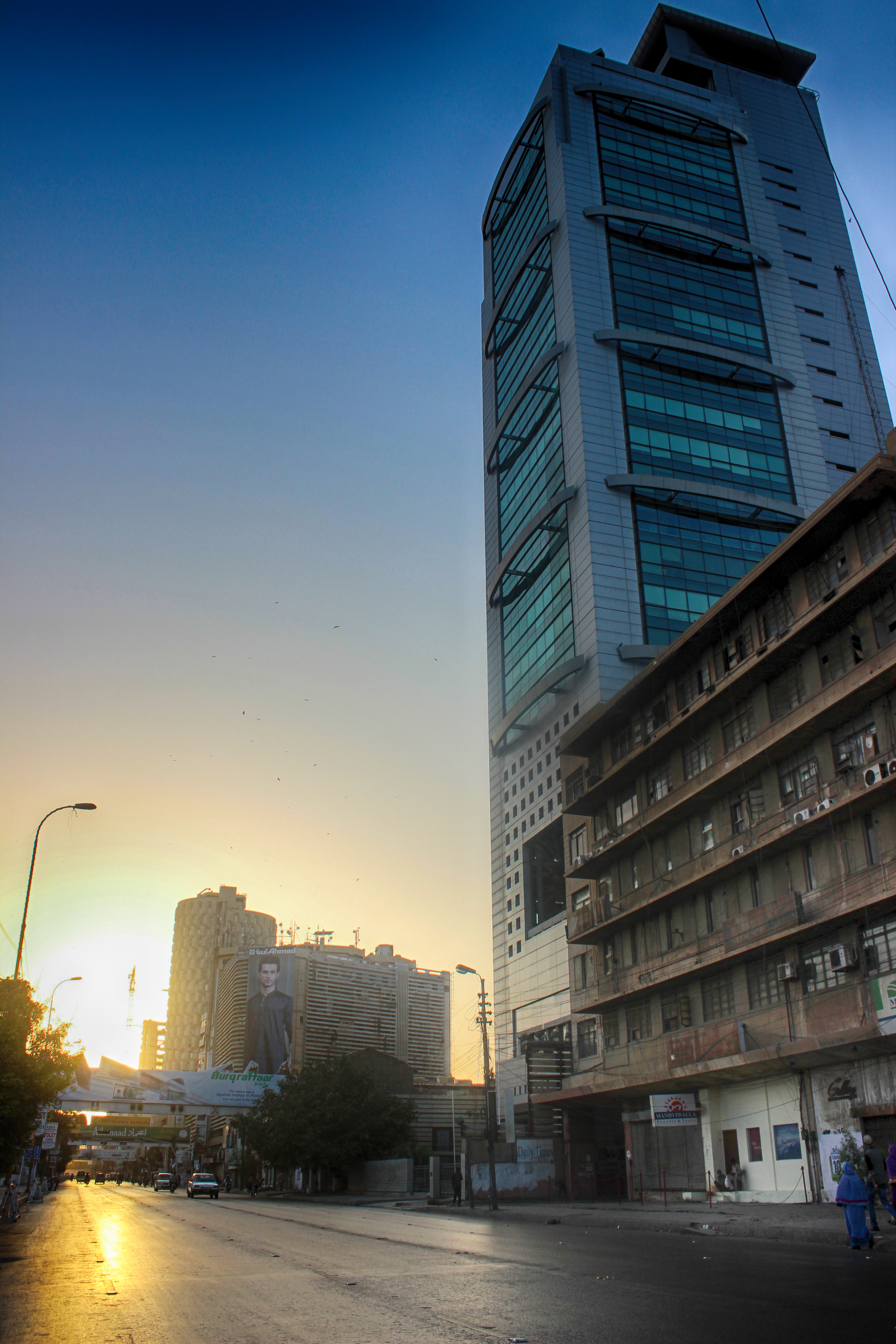
MCB Tower

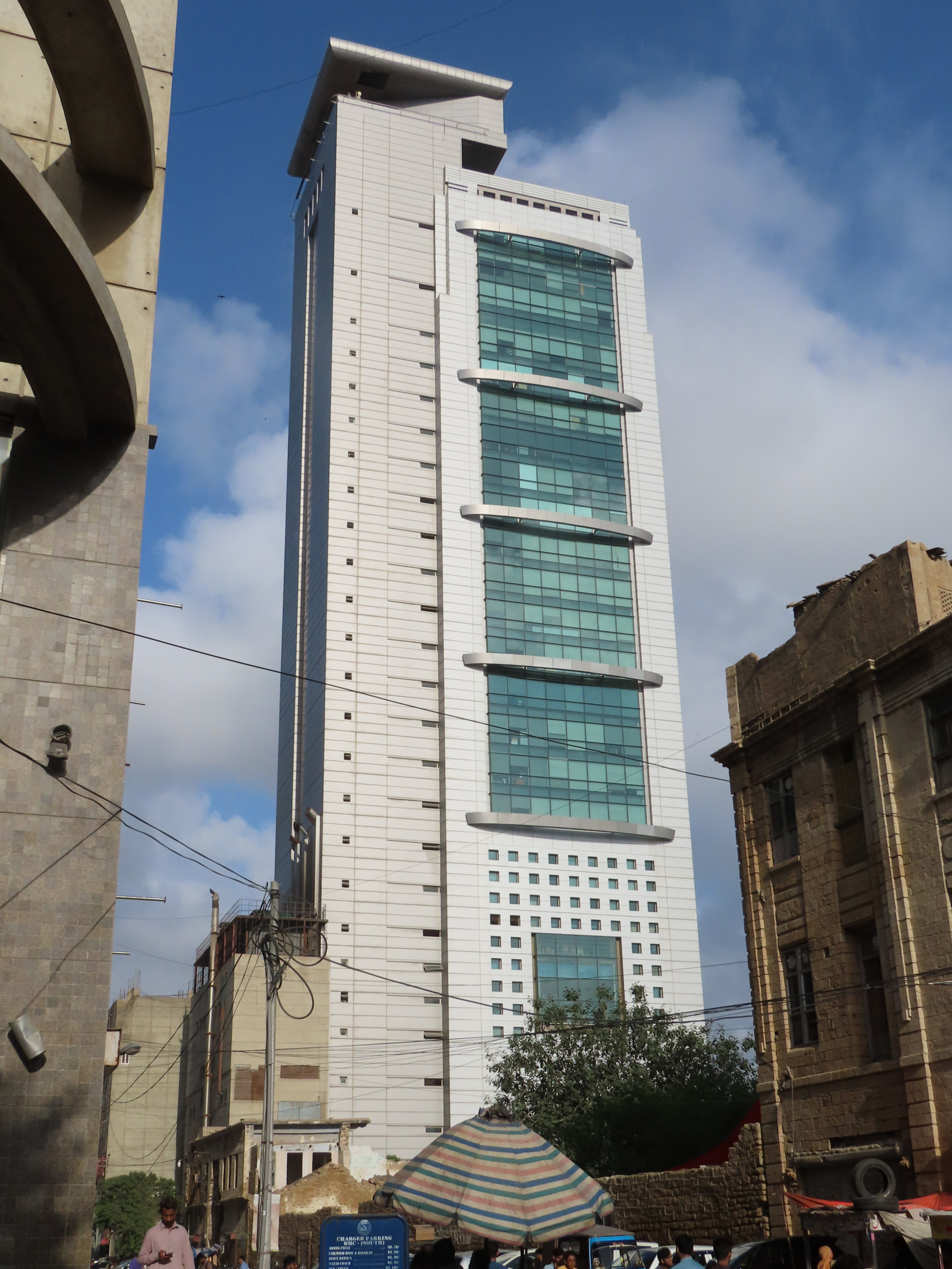
MCB as seen from TechnoCity

== See also ==
- List of tallest buildings in Karachi
- List of tallest buildings in Pakistan
