= Meghpur, Bhuj =

Meghpur Meghpar
- Village
- Location in Gujarat, India Meghpur (India)
- Coordinates: 23.1111545°N 69.564571°E
- Country: India
- State: Gujarat
- Region: Gujarat
- District: Kutch
- Talukas: Bhuj
- Elevation: 147 m (482 ft)

Population (2011)
  - Total: 2,146

Languages
  - Official: Gujarati ગુજરાતી, Hindi हिन्दि
- Time zone: UTC+5:30 (IST)
- Telephone code: 02832
- Vehicle registration: GJ-12
- Website: www.meghpur.com

Meghpur is a village in Kutch, state of Gujarat in western India.

== See also ==
- Meghpur (village), a village in Uttar Pradesh, India
- Samatra
- Bharasar
- Kodki
