= List of tallest structures in India =

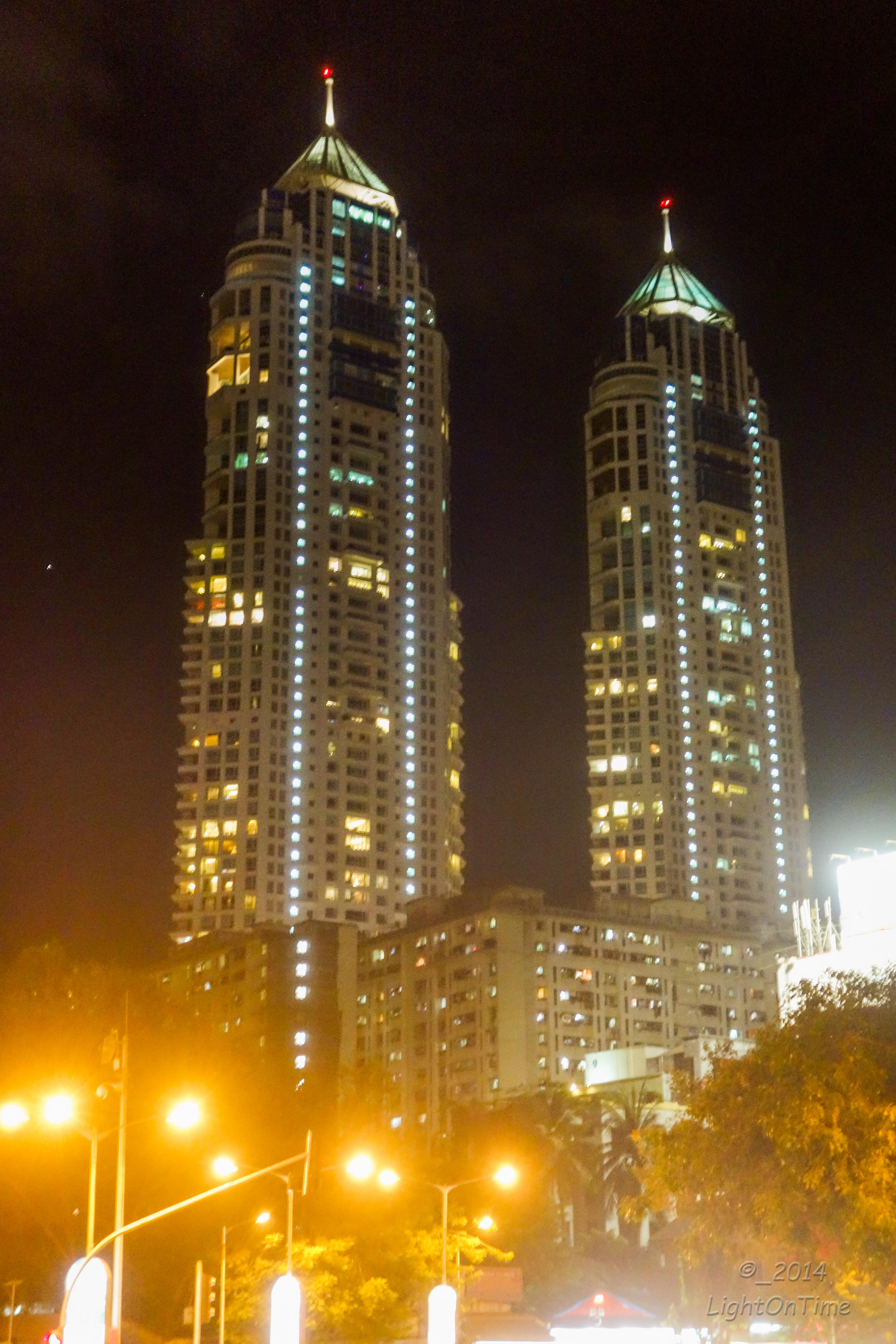
The Imperial Towers, Mumbai

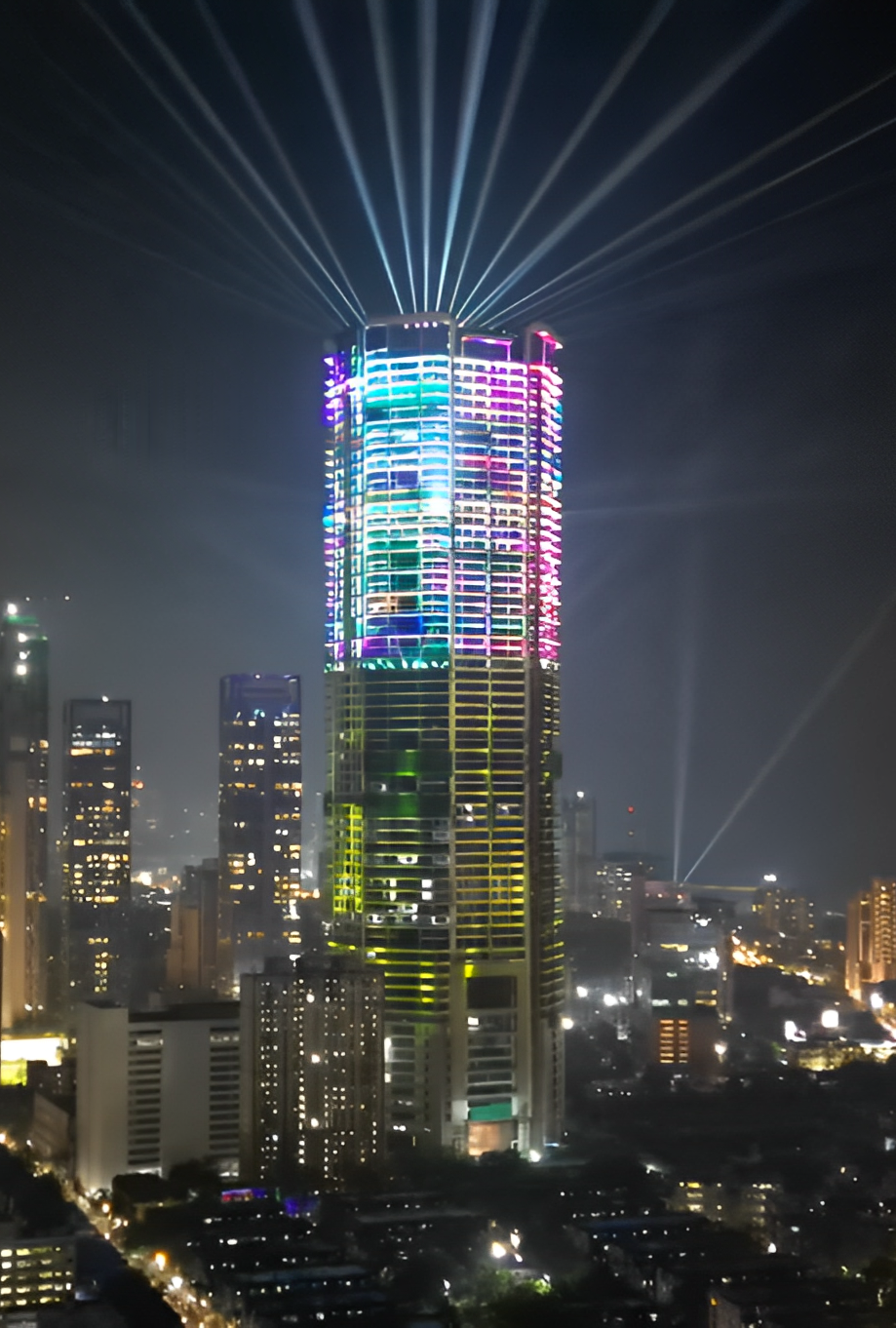
Palais Royale

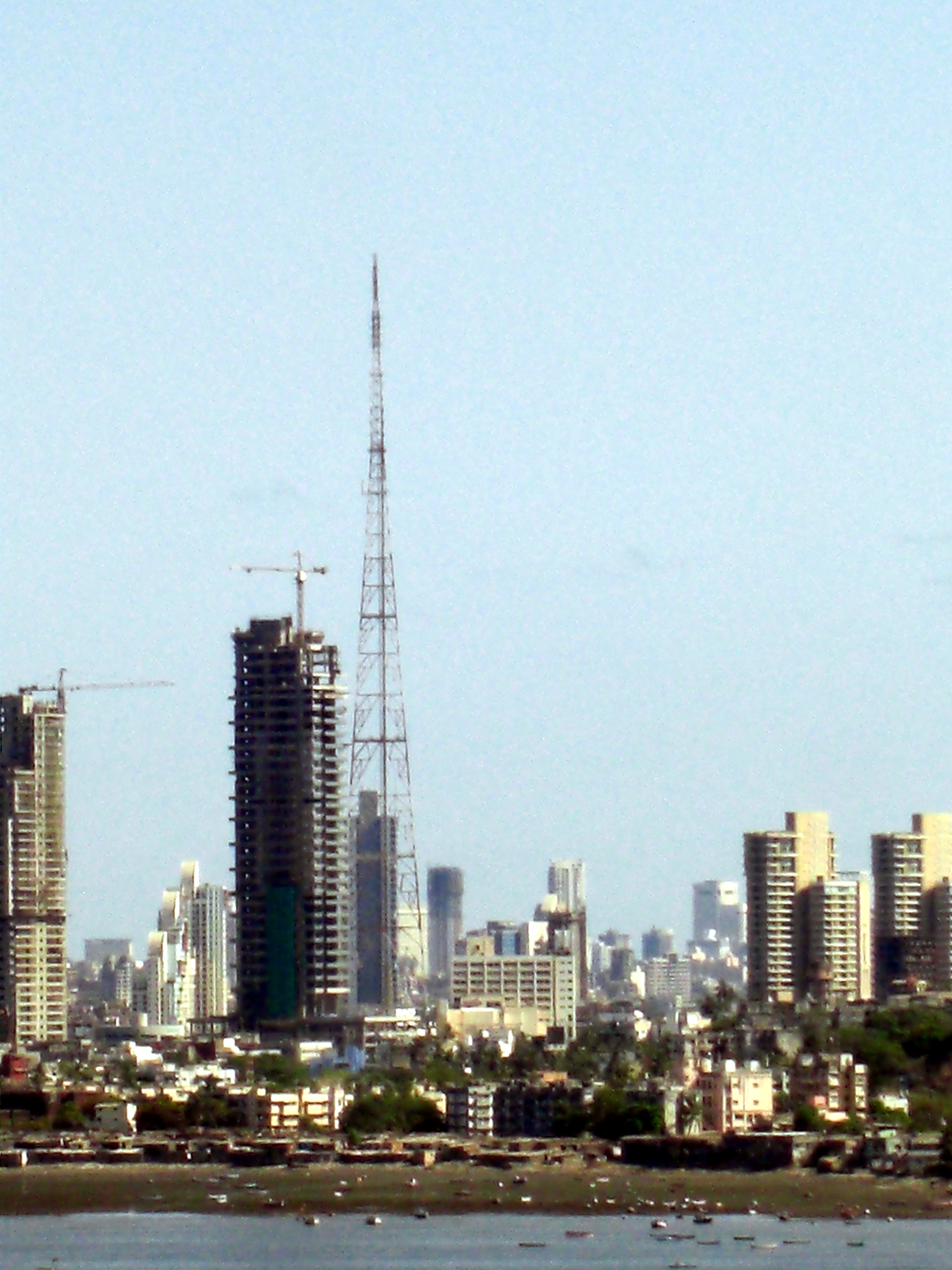
Mumbai Television Tower amidst Worli skyline

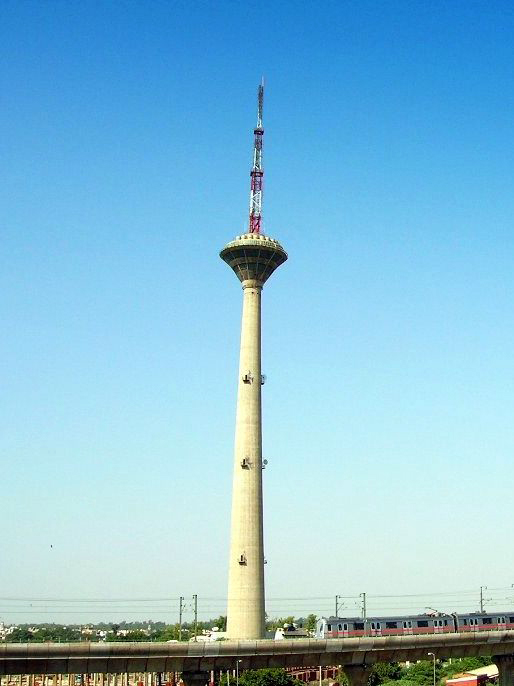
Pitampura TV Tower

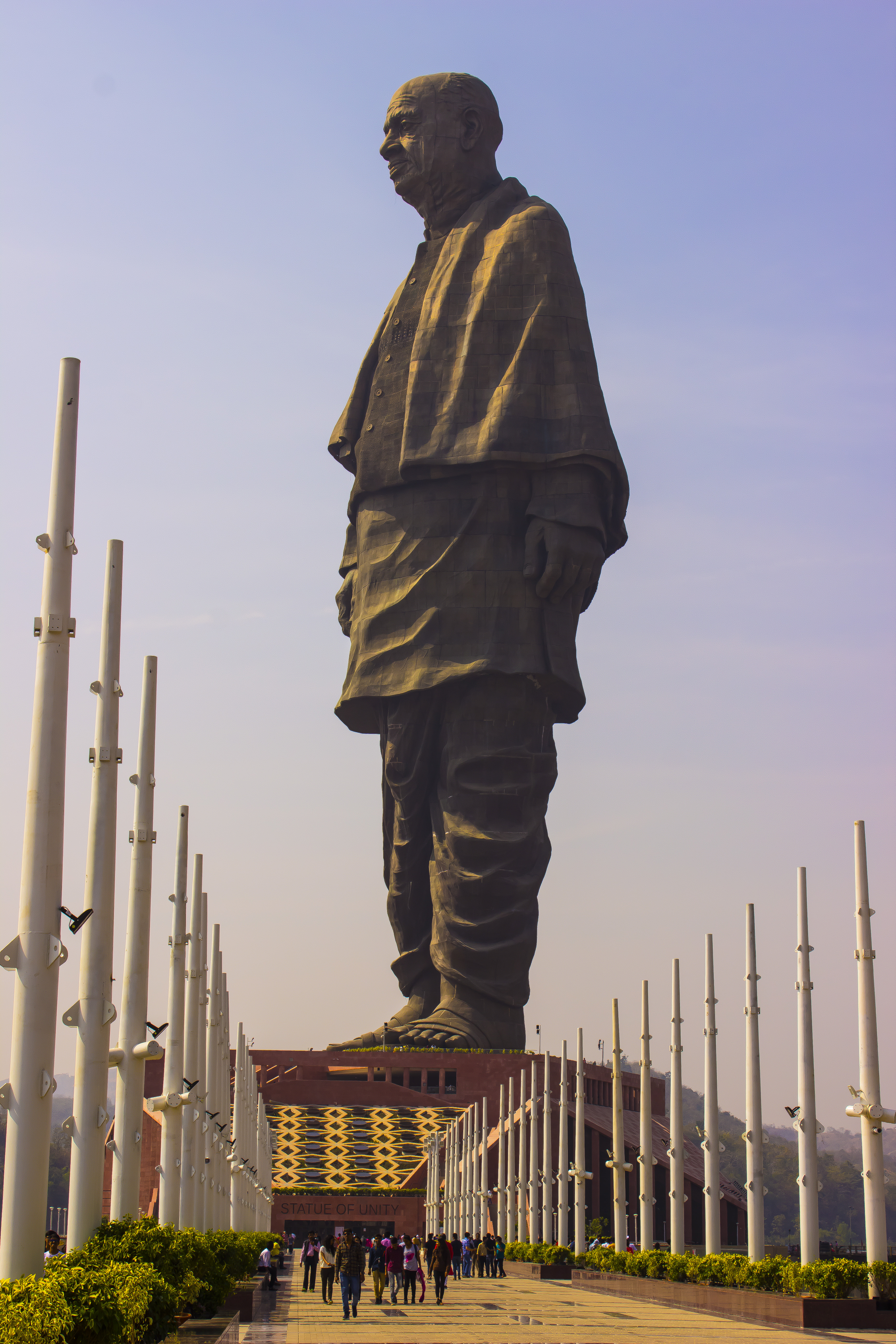
Statue of Unity Sardar Patel

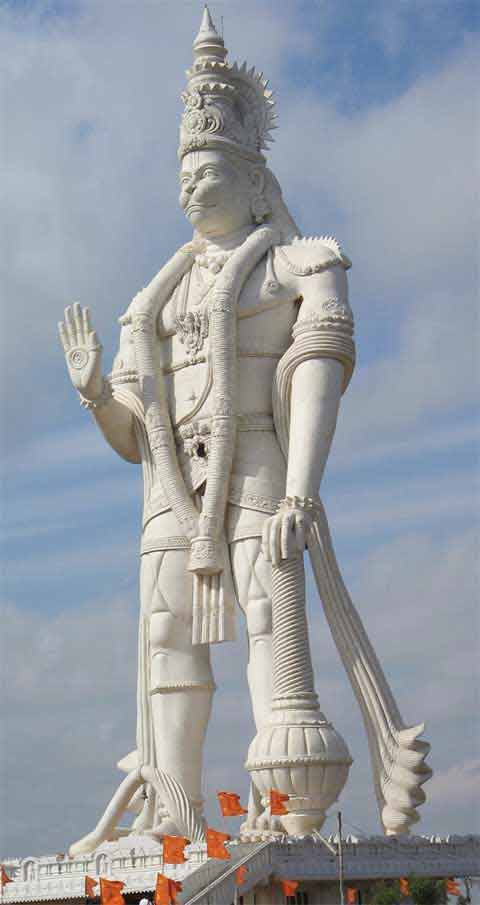
Paritala Anjaneya Temple Hanuman

== Tallest Structures ==
This is a list of the tallest structures in India. The list contains all types of structures that stand at least 250 m (820 ft) tall.

Name	Pinnacle height	Year	Structure type	Location
INS Kattabomman, Large masts	471 metres (1,545 ft)	1990	Guyed mast	Tirunelveli, Tamil Nadu
Rameswaram TV Tower	323 metres (1,060 ft)	1995	Concrete tower	Rameswaram, Tamil Nadu
Fazilka TV Tower	305 metres (1,001 ft)	2007	Lattice tower	Fazilka, Punjab
Lokhandwala Minerva	301 metres (988 ft)	2023	Residential building	Mumbai, Maharashtra
INS Kattabomman, Central Mast	301 metres (988 ft)	1989	Guyed mast	Tirunelveli, Tamil Nadu
Mumbai Television Tower	300 metres (984 ft)	1974	Lattice tower	Mumbai, Maharashtra
Jaisalmer TV Tower	299 m (981 ft)	1993	Concrete tower	Jaisalmer, Rajasthan
Samatra TV Tower	299 m (981 ft)	1999	Concrete tower	Samatra, Gujarat
Palais Royale	297.50 metres (976 ft)	2026	Residential building	Mumbai, Maharashtra
World One	285 metres (935 ft)	2020	Residential building	Mumbai, Maharashtra
World View	285 metres (935 ft)	2020	Residential building	Mumbai, Maharashtra
Piramal Aranya Arav	282.2 metres (926 ft)	2022	Residential building	Mumbai, Maharashtra
AIR Tower	282 metres (925 ft)	2013	Lattice tower	Amritsar
INS Kattabomman, Inner Ring Masts	276.45 metres (907 ft)	1989	Guyed mast	Tirunelveli, Tamil Nadu
Dahanu Thermal Power Station Chimney	275.3 metres (903 ft)	1995	Chimney	Dahanu, Maharashtra
Panki Thermal Power Station Chimney	275 metres (902 ft)	2021	Chimney	Kanpur, Uttar Pradesh
Sagardighi Thermal Power Station Chimney	275 metres (902 ft)	2004	Chimney	Sagardighi, West Bengal
Anpara B Power Plant Chimney	275 metres (902 ft)	1994	Chimney	Anpara, Uttar Pradesh
Korba Power Plant Chimney	275 metres (902 ft)	2009	Chimney	Korba, Chhattisgarh
Tata Power Corporation Chimney	275 metres (902 ft)		Chimney	Mumbai, Maharashtra
Mouda Super Thermal Power Station Chimney	275 metres (902 ft)		Chimney	Kumbhari
Kalisindh Thermal Power Station Chimney	275 metres (902 ft)		Chimney	Jhalawar, Rajasthan
NTPC Ramagundam Chimney	275 metres (902 ft)		Chimney	Ramagundam, Telangana
Anpara A Power Plant Chimney	270 metres (886 ft)	1983	Chimney	Anpara, Uttar Pradesh
Lodha Trump Tower Mumbai	268 metres (879 ft)	2021	Residential building	Mumbai, Maharashtra
Lodha Park Marquise	268 metres (879 ft)	2021	Residential building	Mumbai, Maharashtra
Lodha Park Allura	268 metres (879 ft)	2021	Residential building	Mumbai, Maharashtra
Lodha Park Parkside	268 metres (879 ft)	2021	Residential building	Mumbai, Maharashtra
Lodha Park Kiara	268 metres (879 ft)	2022	Residential building	Mumbai, Maharashtra
Nathani Heights	262 metres (860 ft)	2020	Residential building	Mumbai, Maharashtra
Three Sixty West Tower B	260 metres (853 ft)	2021	Residential building	Mumbai, Maharashtra
The 42	260 metres (853 ft)	2019	Residential building	Kolkata, West Bengal
Imperial 1	256 metres (840 ft)	2010	Residential building	Mumbai, Maharashtra
Imperial 2	256 metres (840 ft)	2010	Residential building	Mumbai, Maharashtra
Three Sixty West Tower A	255.6 metres (839 ft)	2019	Commercial building	Mumbai, Maharashtra
One Avighna Park	251.3 metres (824 ft)	2017	Residential Building	Mumbai, Maharashtra
Ahuja Tower	250 metres (820 ft)	2019	Residential Building	Mumbai, Maharashtra

== Timeline of tallest structures of India ==
Name	Image	City	Height	Years as Tallest
Mahabodhi Temple		Bodh Gaya	55 metres (180 ft)	~500 CE – 1010 CE
Brihadeeswarar Temple		Thanjavur	65.9 metres (216 ft)	1010–1260
Annamalaiyar Temple		Tiruvannamalai	66.4 metres (218 ft)	1260–1368
Qutb Minar		Delhi	72.5 metres (238 ft)	1368–1558
Chaturbhuj Temple		Orchha	104.8 metres (344 ft)	1558–1970
MVRDC		Mumbai	155.9 metres (511 ft)	1970–1974

== See also ==
- List of tallest buildings in India
- List of tallest buildings in Mumbai
- List of tallest buildings in Asia
- List of tallest buildings and structures in the Indian subcontinent
- List of tallest buildings in different cities in India
- List of the tallest statues in India
- List of tallest structures in the world
