= Meghpur =

Meghpur may refer to these places in India :

- Meghpur, Bhuj, a village in Bhuj taluka of Kutch, Gujarat
- Meghpur, Anjar, a village in Anjar taluka of Kutch, Gujarat
- Meghpur, Jaunpur, a village in Jaunpur taluka of Uttar Pradesh
- Meghpur, Veraval, a village in Veraval taluka of Gir somnath Gujrat

== See also ==
- Megh (disambiguation)
- Pur (disambiguation)
