= Megha =

Megha means "cloud" in several Indian languages, comes from the Sanskrit word मेघ (megha, "cloud"). It may refer to:

== Arts and entertainment ==
- Megha (1996 film), an Indian Hindi-language film
- Megha (2014 film), an Indian Tamil-language film
- Megha (2024 film), an Indian Kannada-language film
- Megha (album), a 1999 Assamese album by various artists

== People ==
- Megha, also known as Sumedha, a previous life of the Buddha
- Megha (singer) (born 1987), an Indian Tamil playback singer
- Megha Akash Indian film actress

== See also ==
- Megh (disambiguation)
- Magha (disambiguation)
- Mega (disambiguation)
- Meghna (disambiguation)
