= Palais Royale, Mumbai =

Supertall skyscraper in Mumbai, India

Palais Royale
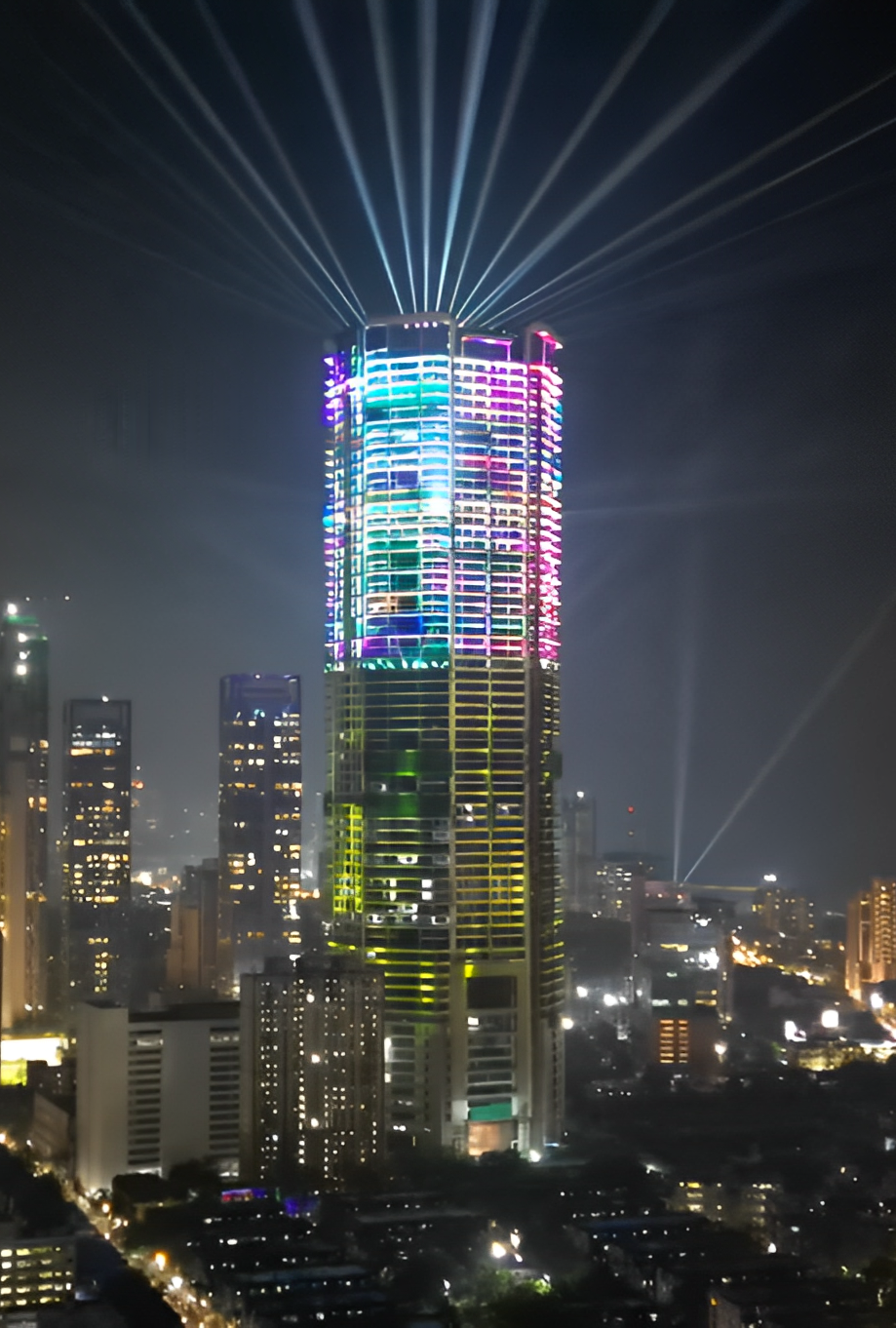
- Palais Royale in 2022

General information
- Status: Structurally Topped out
- Type: Residential skyscraper
- Location: 2R29+6CV, G M Bhosale Road, Worli, Mumbai, Maharashtra 400018, 2R29+6CV, G M Bhosale Road, Worli, Mumbai, Maharashtra 400018, 19°00'02.2"N 72°49'06.9"E
- Coordinates: 18.9995°N 72.8195°E
- Construction started: 30 May 2008
- Topped-out: 2018
- Opening: 30 December 2026
- Cost: ₹3,000 crore (US$320 million)

Height
- Architectural: 297.50 metres (976 ft)

Technical details
- Material: Concrete
- Floor count: 84
- Floor area: 310,000 m^{2} (3.3×10^{6} sq ft)
- Lifts/elevators: 12

Design and construction
- Architect: Talati Panthaky Associates
- Structural engineer: Sterling Engineering Consultancy Services Pvt. Ltd., Mumbai
- Main contractor: Raghuveer Urban Constructions

Palais Royale is an under-construction residential skyscraper in Mumbai, India. At 297.50 metres (976 ft), it is the second-tallest building and tenth-tallest structure in India. The building topped-out in 2018 but its facades and interior are still under construction. Its completion, previously expected by 30 December 2025, has been delayed due to ongoing litigation and is now expected by 30 December 2026.

== History ==
The building is being constructed on land previously owned by Shree Ram Mills Ltd. Permits for construction were granted in 2005, and construction began in 2008. The project's progress has been stalled due to multiple public interest litigation lawsuits filed by NGOs Janhit Manch and UHRF of Delhi. These litigations were disposed of by the Supreme Court of India in October 2019. In its judgement, the Court observed that the lawsuits lacked consistency and bona fides. The promoters of the project have contended that the lawsuits are motivated and sponsored by private interests of rival builder Mufatraj Munot of Kalpataru Builders.

== Architecture ==
The Palais Royale was designed by Talati Panthaky Associates, the tower features an octagonal plan based on concentric circles, that optimizes wind resistance, aligns with Vastu principles, and supports a monumental central atrium rising approximately 215 m, which is known as the tallest in the world. At a structural height of 297.50 m (976 ft) with 84 floors, Palais Royale stands as one of India's tallest residential towers. The structure is an all‑concrete superstructure, reinforced with M‑80 grade self‑compacting concrete, the highest grade used in India to ensure seismic resilience and vertical precision through a 9 m deep transfer girder (deepest in the world) and 3.5 m raft foundation.

The Palais Royale was the first LEED Platinum residential skyscraper in India. Its facade uses DuPont Corian (resistant to acid rain and UV), coupled with double-glazed fenestration, solar water heating, rainwater harvesting, greywater recycling, treated fresh air units, and penetration wind studies for energy efficiency. The project used German MEVA formwork, self-climbing systems for cores, serial concrete pours up to 1,300 m^{3}/day, and luffing-topless cranes, achieving around 75% waste reduction, and incorporating 300+ cameras, biometric controls, and underground parking.

== Present day ==
The site was put up for auction in May 2019, but did not attract any buyers. Another auction was held in mid-2019, and the incomplete site was bought by a company named Honest Shelters for ₹ 705 crore. On completion, the building would have 153 apartments ranging in size between 740 and 1,300 square metres (8,000 and 14,000 sq ft).

== See also ==
- List of tallest buildings in India
- List of tallest buildings in Mumbai
- List of tallest structures in India
- List of tallest buildings and structures in the Indian subcontinent
- List of tallest buildings in different cities in India
- List of tallest buildings in Asia
- List of tallest residential buildings
- List of tallest buildings in the world
- List of tallest structures in the world
