= Talati and Panthaky =

Indian architecture firm

Talati and Partners LLP
- Company type: Real Estate
- Headquarters: Mumbai, Maharashtra, India
- Area served: Worldwide
- Key people: Noshir D Talati – Chairman
- Website: tparch.net

Talati and Partners LLP (TPA) is a Parsi Indian architecture and interior design firm based in Mumbai. Founded in 1975 by Noshir D Talati and Nozer Panthaky, TPA has diversified its service offering over the years to project management, construction supervision and urban design. The company is involved in residential and commercial projects, retail and entertainment centers, universities, airports and hospitals.

TPA has over 300 employees and is currently involved in projects in India and the Middle East of approximately 45 million square feet.

== Notable projects ==
- Palais Royale, Mumbai, India (under construction)
- JK House, Mumbai, India (under construction)
- Shirpur Technology, Nashik Maharashtra, India 2010
- Casa Grande, Mumbai India 2009
- Mumbai Airport, Terminal 1A, India, 2009
- Ceejay House, Mumbai, India, 2007
- Bombay Hospital Indore, India, 2006
- Inox Cinemas, Mumbai/Pune/Chennai/Hyderabad, India, 2003-2009
- Jindal Mansion, Mumbai India, 1991
- Cadbury House India, 1981

== Awards ==
- ET Acetech Real Estate Awards for the Best Designer and Architect of the year 2010
- Century Ply and Aces of Spaces, Hall of Fame Award at the Architecture and Interiors India Awards 2010
- Economic Times ACE Awards for India's Leading Architect 2009
- Construction Source India & CNBC Awaaz-Award for Architecture & Design Excellence — Best Architect of the Year 2009
- Construction World Architect and Builders Awards for Top Ten Architects in India 2008
- Economic Times: ACE awards for India's Designer and Architect of the Year 2007
- Indian Institute of Interior Designers for Lifetime Achievement Award for Professional Excellence 2007
- Lifetime Achievement Award from Society Interiors (Durian) 2004
- American Alumni Association AAA Leadership award by U.S. Ambassador to India * H.E. Frank Wisner
- Hind Ratna Award for Outstanding Service Achievements and Contribution 1994
- Rashtriya Udyog Award by National Economic Forum for Architectural Achievement 1994
- National Unity Award for Outstanding Service Achievements and Contribution 1994
- Interiors Today Award for Excellence in Design and Architecture 1994
- Awarded Fellowship at Indian Institute of Interior Designers (I.I.I.D.) 1991
- Gold Medalist – Free Press Journal Award for Excellence in Designing
