= Bharasar =

- village
- Location in Gujarat, India Bharasar (India)
- Coordinates: 23°11′38.59″N 69°33′38.12″E
- Country: India
- State: Gujarat
- District: Kachchh
- Elevation: 137 m (449 ft)

Languages
  - Official: Gujarati, Hindi
- Time zone: UTC+5:30 (IST)
- PIN: 370 030, Post Bharasar, Bhuj-Kutch
- Telephone code: 91 2832
- Vehicle registration: GJ-12
- Nearest city: Bhuj
- Website: gujaratindia.com

Bharasar is a small village in the Kutch District of Gujarat, India.

The Bharasar Gram panchayat is the local administrative governing body, and the village being a Bhuj Taluka, is partially funded and accountable to authorities in nearby Bhuj City.

The main religion of the villagers is Hinduism, Swaminarayan Sampraday. Nearby villages include Manukwa, Naranpur, Sukhpur, and Samatra.

The village mainly consists of farmland on the outskirts, with many residential homes, along with two bank branches and a girls' school.

Many residents have emigrated to the United Kingdom in London or Bolton, and some have to Kenya.

Bharasar is one of the 24 villages that have formed the Shree Kutch Leva Patel Community (SKLPC).

== History ==
Within the area is the ancient Harappan Dam of Bharasar, which is the area of the origin of the tributary of the river Zadko from the hills of Khatrod Lanki area near hills of Bharasar.

Originally, Haraappan Dam was 500 meters south. Actual overflow of the water from the dam was collected by a small reservoir near the old Bharasar (Harappan time - 2000BC). It was called Bhara Sar, which refers to Sarovar, suggesting a lake was located there. Later, Maharao shri Bharmalji resettled the Village, and it was called a new name, Bhara Sar.

Overflow of dam water from the reservoir was utilised for irrigation in the lower area by means of ground water channels cut in the stones of the grounds. When required, the necessary water was acquired from the original dam above the level of the big dam, the actual Harappan dam.
