= MEVA Schalungs-Systeme =

German producer of formwork systems

MEVA Schalungs Systeme
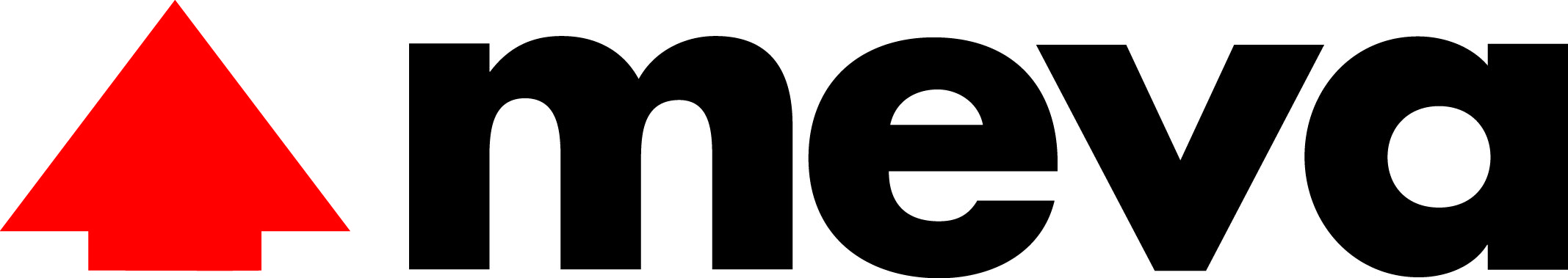
- Company type: GmbH
- Industry: Construction
- Founded: 1970 by Gerhard Dingler
- Headquarters: Haiterbach, Germany
- Key people: Florian F Dingler
- Products: Formwork Systems
- Revenue: €130 million (2020)
- Number of employees: ~600 (2020)
- Website: www.meva.net

MEVA Formwork Systems is a German construction company that produces formwork systems distributed internationally. It is headquartered in Haiterbach, Germany, under the name MEVA Schalungs-System GmbH. The MEVA group has 40 subsidiaries, plants and logistics centers on five continents.

== History ==
MEVA was founded in 1970 by Gerhard Dingler. The idea of developing a reusable formwork system led to the company's founding and to the development of the first frame-based, panelised formwork system with a facing integrated into a metal frame, which was named the formwork panel. These panels are produced in different sizes and can be freely combined, hence the name modular formwork system.

In 1971, MEVA presented the first modular panelised formwork system. In 1977, MEVA invented the formwork clamp that connects to panels. A year later, a lighter design of frame with hollow profiles and grooves is presented.

In 1981, the crane-independent formwork system for walls and slabs was marketed. In 1982, MEVA's Mammut wall formwork system was a heavy-duty system with a load capacity of 97 kN/m^{2}. In 1989, MEVA developed the aluminium wall formwork system. In 2000, MEVA created an all-plastic facing design.

In 2012, MEVA's automatic climbing system, MAC, was used on sites in Europe after several years of use in Australia and the Far East.

In 2016, MEVA Mammut XT had flexible single- and two-sided anchoring without additional attachments.

== Products ==
MEVA designs, constructs, produces and markets frame formwork systems for on-site concrete applications in the building industry. MEVA also produces special formwork for irregular building geometries or surfaces without joints. MEVA offers:

- Crane-independent wall formwork systems with aluminum frames
- Crane-dependent wall formwork for large-size, heavy-duty applications
- Support frames for single-sided wall applications
- formwork systems for columns and curved walls
- Slab formwork systems
- Safety systems and equipment, e.g. wall formwork systems with integrated platforms and ladder access, folding, pouring and safety-catch platforms, shoring and stair towers
- Climbing formwork: climbing scaffold, automatic climbing system, guided screens and climbing systems

== Projects ==
MEVA's formwork is partially used for on-site concrete work on these construction sites:

=== Architectural construction ===
- University of Economics and Business, Vienna, Austria
- Football Stadium Pancho Arena, Felcsút, Hungary

=== Civil engineering construction ===
- Football Stadium Pancho Arena, Felcsút, Hungary
- JVA Augsburg/Germany
- Linth–Limmern Power Stations, Linthal, Swiss
- Sorenga Tunnel, Oslo, Norway
- Stuttgart Trade Fair, Stuttgart, Germany
- Stadionul Naţional, Bucharest, Romania
- Victoria Square, Shopping Centre, Belfast, Northern Ireland
- Loch Katrine freshwater reservoir, Glasgow, Scotland
- Metro M4, Budapest, Hungary
- Saint Petersburg Dam, Saint Petersburg, Russia

=== High-rise construction ===
- Burj Khalifa, Dubai, UAE. The world's tallest building; 818 m (2,684 ft)
- Hoffmann-La Roche, Basel, Swiss tallest building
- Marina 101, Dubai, UAE
- The Federation Tower, Moscow, Russia. Europe's tallest office building: 506 m (1,660 ft)
- Q1 (building) 323 m (1,058 ft), Gold Coast, Queensland, Australia
- Palais Royale, Mumbai, India
- Lilian Tower, Dubai, UAE
- The Jazz Residences, Manila, Philippines

=== Commercial and residential construction ===
- Hoffmann-La Roche, Basel, Swiss tallest building
- Battersea, London, UK
- University of Economics and Business, Vienna, Austria
- Marina 101, Dubai, UAE
- Football Stadium Pancho Arena, Felcsút, Hungary
- Sorenga Tunnel, Oslo/Norway
- Worcester Technical High School, Worcester, Massachusetts, US
- Loch Katrine freshwater reservoir, Glasgow, Scotland
- Moorburg Power Station, Hamburg, Germany
- Ohio University park garage, Athens, Ohio, US
- Leipzig University, Leipzig, Germany
- Metro M4, Budapest, Hungary
- Restoration of the Königsbau, Stuttgart, Germany
- Hazaa Bin Zayed Stadium, Al Ain, VAE
- City of Dreams expansion, Macau
