= Megh =

Megh (lit. 'cloud/rain' in Sanskrit) may refer to:

- Meghalaya or Megh Alaya, a state in northeastern India, meaning "cloud abode"
- Megh (raga), a classical Indian raga
- Meghwal, a people of northwest India and Pakistan
- Cyclone Megh, a cyclone in the Arabian sea that struck the island of Socotra in 2015

== See also ==
- Megha (disambiguation)
- Meghpur (disambiguation)
