= Mumbai Television Tower =

Coordinates: 19°00′26″N 72°49′12″E

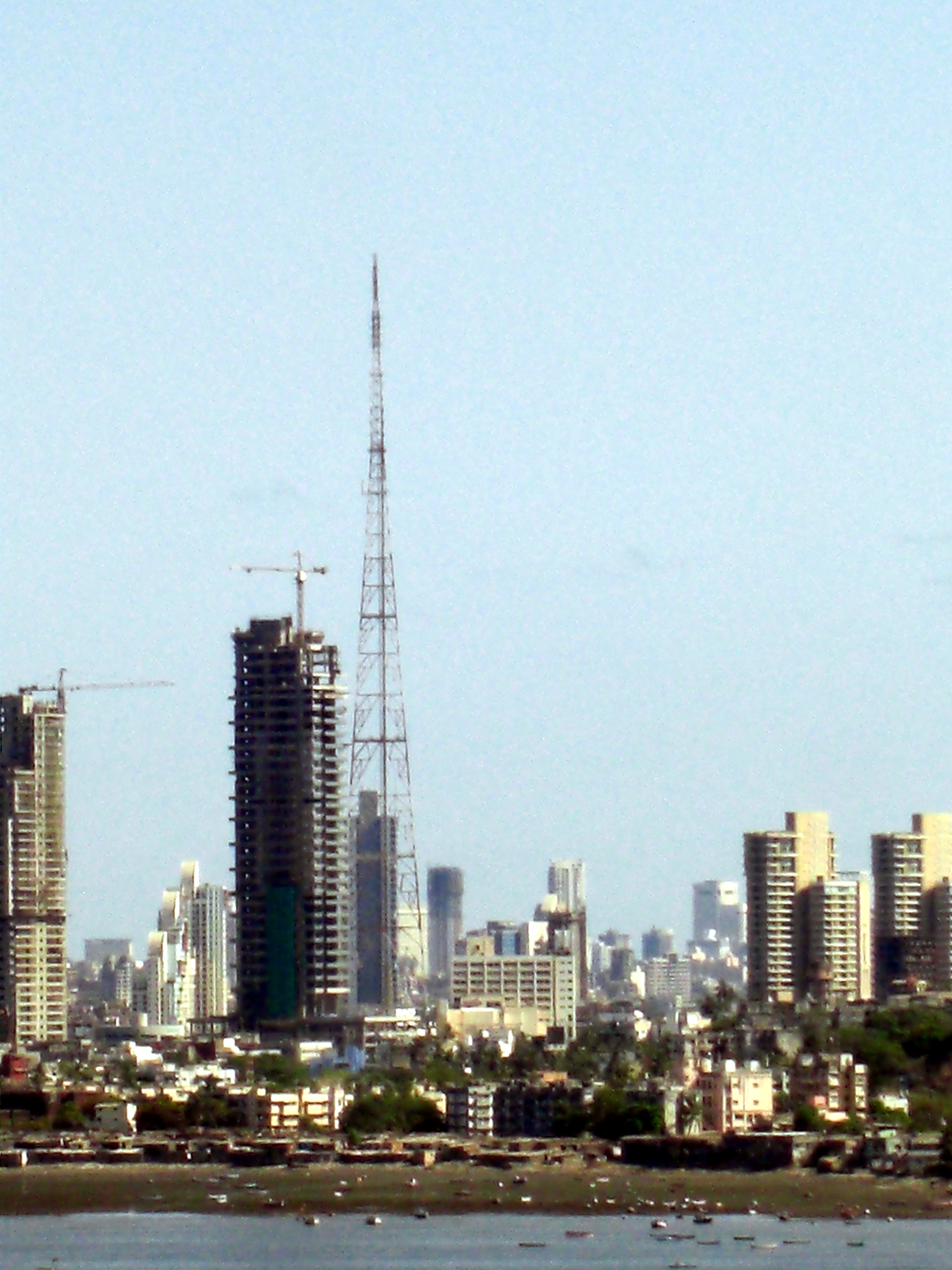

- Location within India

General information
- Status: Completed
- Type: Steel lattice television tower
- Location: Mumbai
- Completed: 1972

Height
- Height: 300 m (984 ft)

The Mumbai Television Tower, also known as the Worli Doordarshan Tower, is the television tower owned by Doordarshan, the public-broadcaster located in the city of Mumbai in India. It stands at 300 metres (984 feet) and is the fourth-tallest man-made structure in the Indian subcontinent. The red and white tower is an open latticework structure. The tower, located at Worli, can be seen from most parts of South Mumbai.

A 32-minute documentary titled Tale of a Tower was produced by the Films Division of India featuring footage of the tower topped out in 1972.

== See also ==
- Lattice tower
- List of tallest freestanding structures in the world
- List of tallest freestanding steel structures
