= Samatra TV tower =

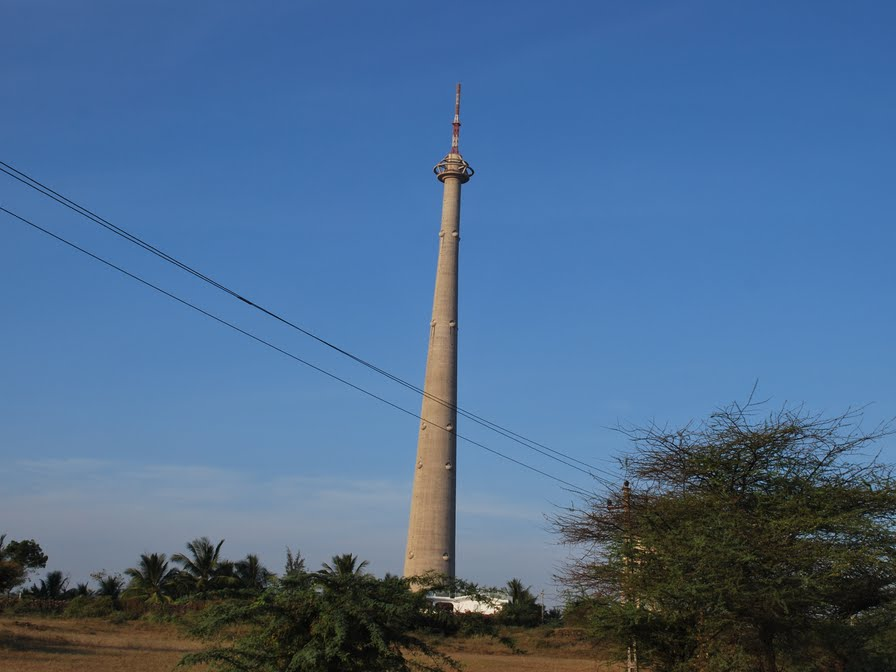
- Samatra TV tower
- Interactive map of the Samatra TV tower area

General information
- Type: TV and radio broadcasting tower
- Location: Bhuj, India
- Coordinates: 23.191859°N 69.476877°E
- Completed: 1999

Height
- Antenna spire: 300 m (984 ft)

Samatra TV tower is a television and radio broadcasting tower located near Samatra village, 12 miles (19 km) west of Bhuj in Kutch district, Gujarat, India. It was completed in 1999. With a height of 300 m (984 ft), it is 8th-tallest structure in India and 201st-tallest structure in the world.
