= Kodki =

- village
- Location in Gujarat, India Kodki (India)
- Coordinates: 23.246669°N 69.558986°E
- Country: India
- State: Gujarat
- District: Kachchh

Languages
  - Official: Gujarati, Hindi
- Time zone: UTC+5:30 (IST)
- Vehicle registration: GJ-12
- Website: gujaratindia.com

Kodki is a village, located 11 km west of Bhuj, in Kachchh District in the state of Gujarat, India. It is one of 24 gaams (villages) occupied by the Shree Kutch Leva Patel Community (SKPLC).

Kodki was originally a settlement of Rebari and Maaldharis, (Nomadic tribes, whose main activity is cattle herding). The earliest arrival of Kanbis dates back to 1870s (from dabasiya and Hiranis). Halais and Hiranis were the earliest Kanbis to settle in Kodki and take up agriculture. The original name was Bhavanipur, named after the Maaldhari's family goddess Bhavani Maa.

In 2007, the village had a population of approximately 4,000 people and a total of 600 houses.
