= Meghpur, Jaunpur =

Village in Jaunpur, Uttar Pradesh, India

Meghpur is a village in Jaunpur, Uttar Pradesh, India. This village falls under Jalalpur Thana. The latitude and longitude position is 25.6037802, 82.7321342 . This Village is 4 km far away from Jalalganj (JLL) Railway station and 3 km from Jalalpur. This Village is 24 km away from Lal Bahadur Shastri International Airport. The neighbor villages are Purev, Mojara, Nahora, Than, Rasulpur, Lakhamipur and Salempur.

Village : Meghpur

Post Office : Jalalpur

Pincode : 222136

Thana : Jalalpur

Vikas Khand : Jalalpur

Tehsil : Kerakat

District : Jaunpur

Mandal : Varanasi

State : Uttar Pradesh

Country : Bharat (India)
