= Samatra =

Village in India

- village
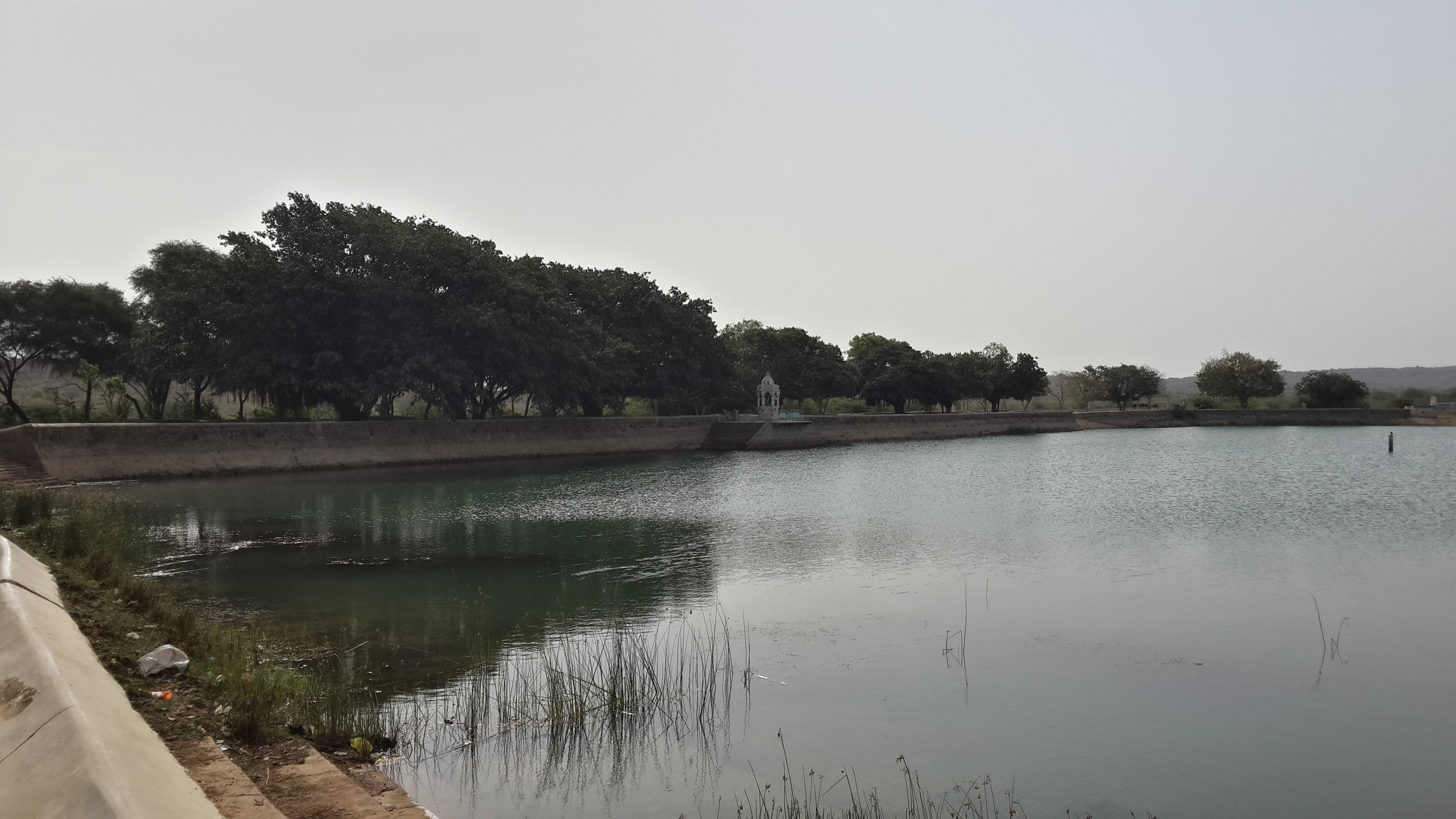
- Umrasar Tadav, Samatra

- Location in Gujarat, India
- Coordinates: 23.192224°N 69.497041°E
- Country: India
- State: Gujarat
- District: Kachchh

Languages
  - Official: Gujarati, Hindi
- Time zone: UTC+5:30 (IST)
- Nearest city: Bhuj
- Website: http://samatra.org

Samatra is a village in the Kutch district of Gujarat state, India.

== Samatra TV tower ==
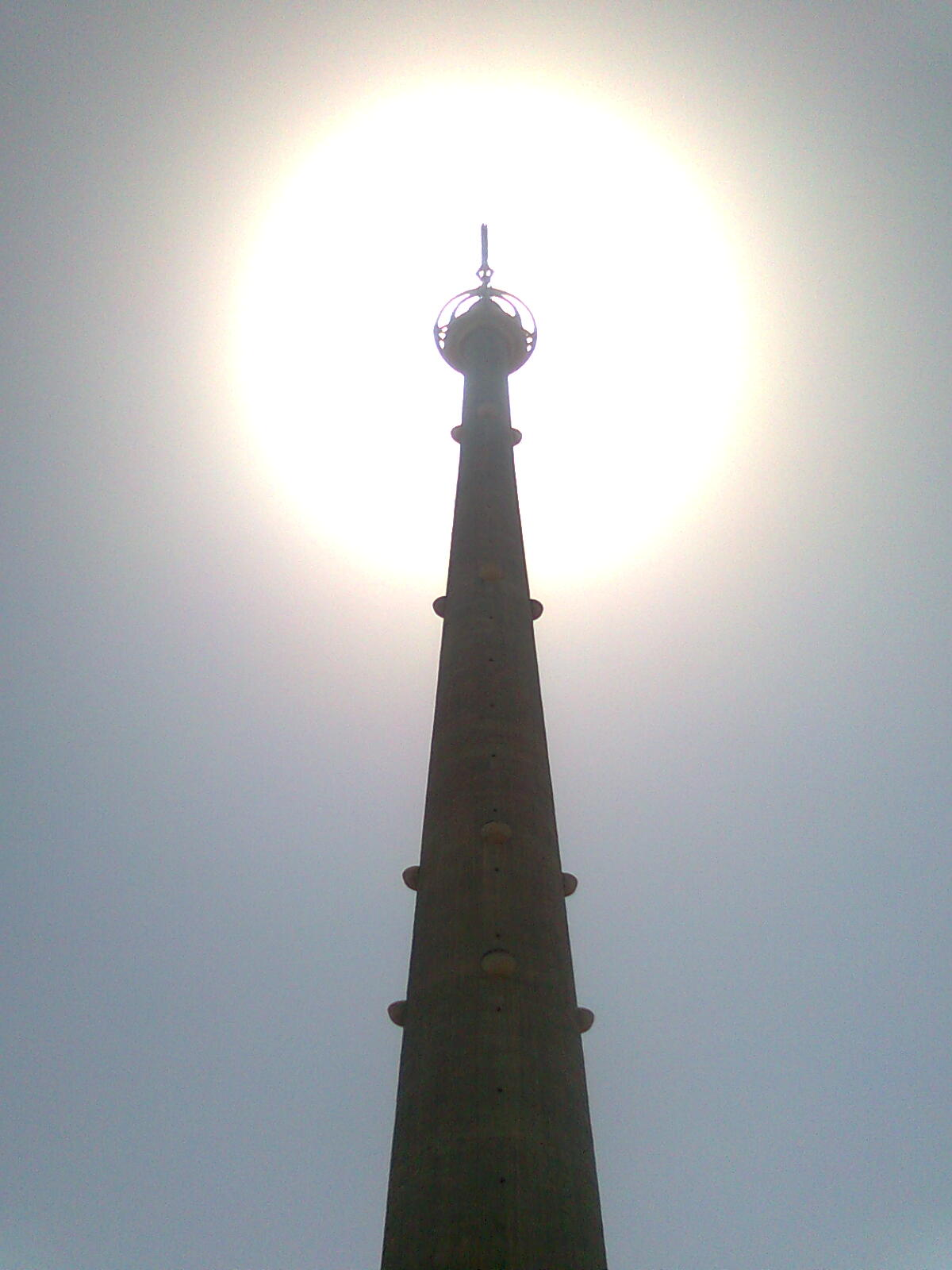
Samatra TV tower

Samatra's TV tier is 300 m (330 yd) high.

== See also ==
- Samatra TV Tower
